= New York, Susquehanna and Western 142 =

Exported SY class 2-8-2 steam locomotive

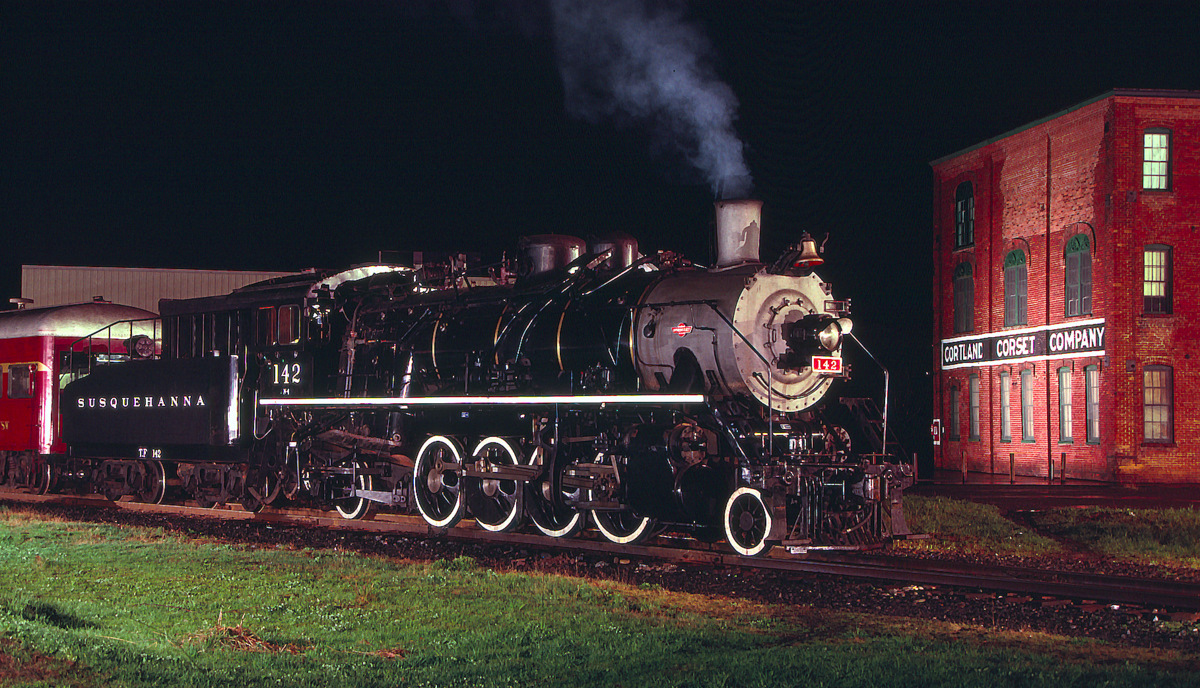
- No. 142 idling in Cortland, New York in May 1992
Type and origin
- Power type: Steam
- Builder: Tangshan Locomotive and Rolling Stock Works
- Serial number: SY-1647M
- Model: SY
- Build date: May 2, 1989
Specifications
- Configuration
  - Whyte: 2-8-2
  - UIC: 1’D1’
- Gauge: 4 ft 8 1/2 in (1,435 mm) standard gauge
- Leading dia.: 840 mm (33 in; 2.76 ft)
- Driver dia.: 1,370 mm (54 in; 4.49 ft)
- Trailing dia.: 1,000 mm (39 in; 3.3 ft)
- Wheelbase
  - Engine: 31 ft 4 in (9.55 m)
  - Drivers: 14 ft 6 in (4.42 m)
- Length: 21,643 mm (852.1 in; 71.007 ft)
- Width: 3,300 mm (130 in; 10.8 ft)
- Height: 4,446 mm (175.0 in; 14.587 ft)
- Adhesive weight: 70 t (150,000 lb; 70,000 kg)
- Loco weight: 84 t (185,000 lb; 84,000 kg)
- Tender weight: 54.5 t (120,000 lb; 54,500 kg)
- Tender type: Sloped-back
- Fuel type: Coal
- Fuel capacity: 9.5 t (21,000 lb; 9,500 kg)
- Water cap.: 25,000 L (6,600 US gal)
- Firebox
  - Grate area: 4.57 m^{2} (49.2 sq ft)
- Boiler pressure: 210 psi (1,400 kPa)
- Heating surface: 161 m^{2} (1,733.0 sq ft)
- Superheater
  - Heating area: 65.5 m^{2} (705.0 sq ft)
- Cylinders: Two, outside
- Cylinder size: 530 mm × 710 mm (21 in × 28 in)
- Valve gear: Walschaerts
- Valve type: Piston valves
- Loco brake: Air
- Train brakes: Air
- Couplers: Knuckle
Performance figures
- Maximum speed: 50 mph (80.47 km/h)
- Power output: 1,500 hp (1,100 kW)
- Tractive effort: 20,475 kgf (45,140 lbf; 200.79 kN)
- Factor of adh.: 4.05
Career
- Operators: Valley Railroad; New York, Susquehanna and Western Railway; New York, Susquehanna and Western Technical and Historical Society; Belvidere and Delaware River Railway
- Class: New: SY; Now: N-4 (NYSW)
- Numbers: VALE 1647; NYSW 142; THSX 142; BDRV 142
- Nicknames: Miss Suzy Q
- Delivered: December 17, 1989
- First run: May 8, 1989 (first test run); March 21, 1990 (VALE test run)
- Current owner: New York, Susquehanna and Western Technical and Historical Society
- Disposition: Operational

New York, Susquehanna and Western 142 is a China Railways SY class 2-8-2 "Mikado" type steam locomotive. It was built in May 1989 as SY-1647M by the Tangshan Locomotive and Rolling Stock Works for export to the Valley Railroad (VALE) in the United States. Its design was altered to meet requirements for U.S. operation. It made its inaugural run in early 1990.

Inspired by VALE, the New York, Susquehanna and Western Railway (NYSW) ordered a similar locomotive, but it sank with its cargo ship en route from China. So the NYS&W bought VALE's locomotive in late 1991, renumbered it as 142, and used it pull mainline excursion trains in New Jersey and New York state.

Since 2003, the locomotive has been owned by the New York, Susquehanna and Western Technical and Historical Society, and since 2004, it has been operated by the Belvidere and Delaware River Railway (BDRV).

== Background ==
=== Design ===
No. 142’s associated class, the SY locomotive, was built for use in switching and freight services in Chinese industrial areas, such as coal mines, petroleum fields, chemical plants, and steel mills. In mining areas with long-distance rail networks, the SYs would also haul passenger trains for workers. The SY prefix was an abbreviation for shàngyóu (Chinese for "aim high" (上游). The SYs were developed from the JF6 class, which in turn was a variant of the ALCO-designed JF1 class, but the SYs came with different design features; the SYs had different motion bracket arrangements, taller smokestacks, all boxpok driving wheels, a higher boiler pressure (210 psi (1,400 kPa), and a lower axle loading (15 tonnes (33,000 lb).

Since the SYs often operated in reverse, their tender tanks, which carried 9.5 tonnes (21,000 pounds) of coal and 25,000 liters (6,600 U.S. gal) of water, were built with sloped-back sides to improve rearward vision for crews. The first SY (SY-0001) was built by the Tangshan Locomotive and Rolling Stock Works in 1960, and for the next three decades, over 1,800 were built by Tangshan and other manufacturers, before production ceased in 1999.

=== Valley Railroad dilemma ===
In September 1985, the Valley Railroad (VALE), a tourist railroad based in Essex, Connecticut, experienced some problems with their steam operations; 2-8-0 No. 97, while still serviceable, was due for an overhaul, and 2-8-2 No. 40 had to be removed from service, after breaking a driving wheel tire. While No. 97 had to cover the VALE's schedule, the railroad began to consider acquiring another steam locomotive.

The following year, the VALE decided that they would import a new steam locomotive from China, since Chinese steam locomotives were still being mass-produced at that time, and their specifications were identical to those on North American locomotives. VALE board member Bob Bell and chief mechanical officer J. David Conrad visited three separate factories in China, and they negotiated with them to build a new locomotive specifically for use in North American excursion service.

== History ==
=== Construction and export ===
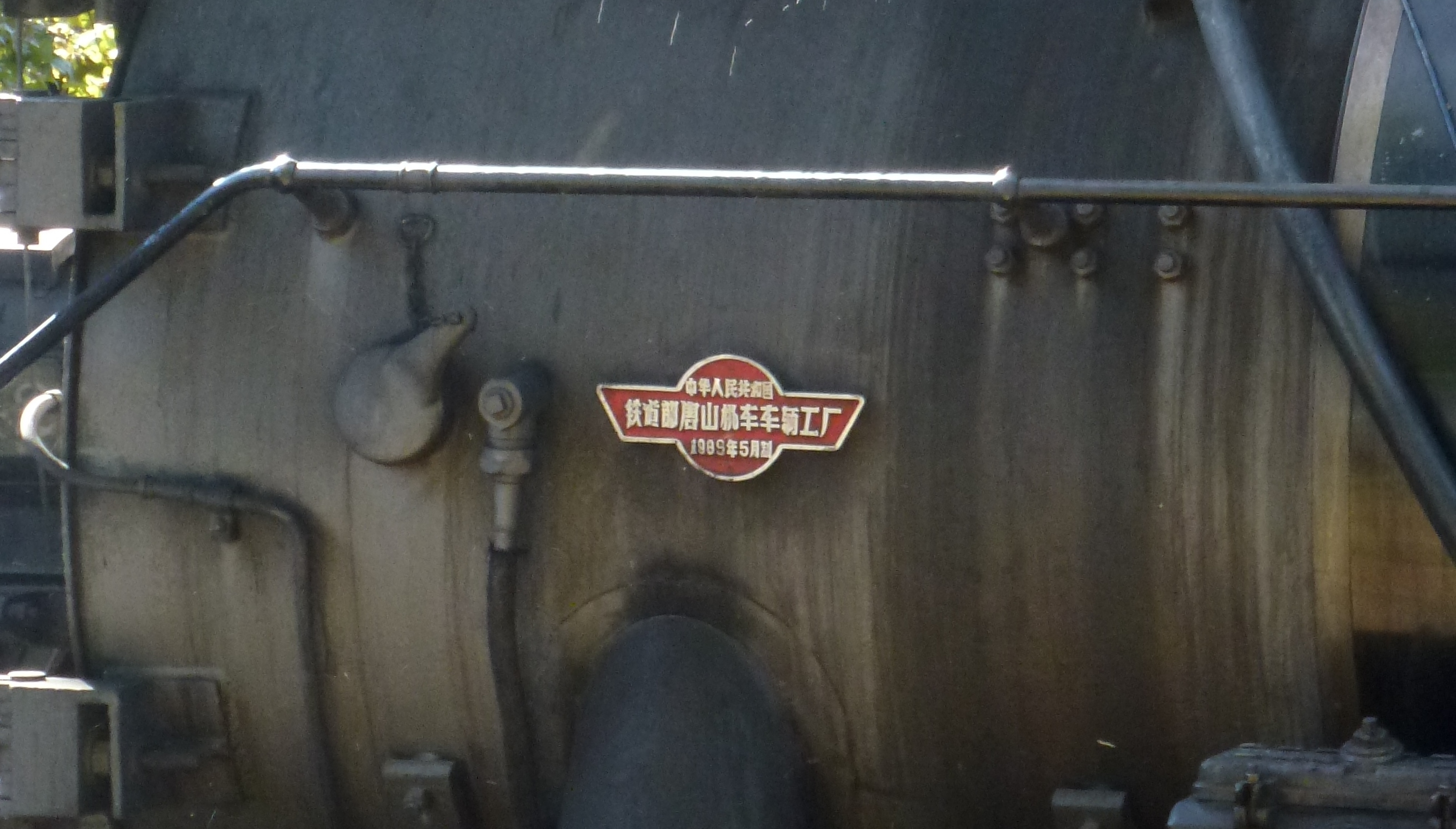
Susquehanna No. 142's builder's plate

Stock-standard Chinese steam locomotives were prohibited from operating in the Northeastern U.S., due to certain construction methods. So before construction began, the state of Connecticut ordered the boiler to be redesigned to match the boiler code from the American Society of Mechanical Engineers (ASME). In 1988, the VALE ordered the locomotive for $300,000 from the Tangshan Locomotive and Rolling Stock Works, whose workers were willing to study American boiler codes and regulations, and whose lighter locomotive designs better suited tourist operations. The new locomotive was to be a copy of Tangshan's SY class, and it was to be numbered SY-1647M, "M" indicating its planned shipment to America. (Note: A second SY-1647 locomotive was built specifically for domestic usage in China, and it was assigned to work at the Tongliao Power Station.)

The Chinese-written construction plans for the boiler were translated to English with converted measurements, and engineer Joe Michaels studied the plans to identify the required modifications. The way the boiler was welded together had to be altered; the firebox sheets had to be thickened; and the crownsheet staybolts had to be enlarged. Furthermore, the engineer's controls, which were positioned on the left side of the cab in China, had to be moved to the right side for American usage. Larry Loke, a representative of the Hartford Steam Boiler Inspection and Insurance Company, regularly inspected the construction and testing of the modified boiler. On May 2, 1989, the SY-1647M locomotive was completed and was test fired for the first time that same day. Six days later on May 8, the locomotive made a successful test run.

After the VALE announced plans to import a Chinese locomotive, other tourist railroads began to follow suit. Sloan Cornell ordered SY-1658M from Tangshan, a duplicate of SY-1647M, for his Pennsylvania-based Knox and Kane Railroad. Additionally, the Boone and Scenic Valley Railroad of Iowa bought stock-standard JS class locomotive No. 8419 from the Datong Locomotive Factory, since the state of Iowa allowed standard Chinese boilers for hobbyist and tourist usage, and the Arizona-based Grand Canyon Railway (GCR) looked into acquiring some American-built KD7 class 2-8-0s.

All locomotives were to be shipped across the Pacific Ocean by mid-1989, but no freighter ship could be secured for several months, due to that year's Tiananmen Square protests. GCR backed out of their KD7 acquisitions, since they were unwilling to wait out the ordeal. The WMSR canceled their order as the Allegany County commissioners persuaded the WMSR into purchasing an American-built locomotive instead, believing it would be a better suit them. In September, when one ship was secured, the M.V. Trade Fir, the two SY locomotives were loaded aboard in Dalian, and No. 8419 was loaded in Qingdao, and then the eastbound voyage began. In November, the M.V. Trade Fir stopped at Long Beach, California, to unload No. 8419, and then the ship carried the two SY locomotives to the Northeastern U.S. via the Panama Canal. On December 17, the M.V. Trade Fir docked at the Port of Camden in New Jersey, and the two SY locomotives were unloaded at the Beckett Street Terminal. They were subsequently shipped to their respective destinations via Conrail.

=== VALE excursion service ===
US states visited by No. 142 in excursion service

On January 13, 1990, SY-1647M arrived at the Valley Railroad's location in Essex. Crews added more modifications to the locomotive, adding a bell atop the smokebox door, and replacing the Chinese safety valves with American-model valves for safety. On March 21, No. 1647 performed its first test run on VALE trackage. On April 21, the SY hauled its inaugural train on the VALE between Essex and Deep River, Connecticut: 12 passenger cars, the longest passenger train in VALE's history. The following day, No. 1647 ran at low speed into the rear of the idling North Cove Express dinner train on passing trackage. Ten minor injuries were reported, and a damaged coupler on one of the cars had to be replaced.

Operating No. 1647 in excursion service was deemed a success, and the locomotive consumed less coal than Nos. 97 and 40. No. 97 was relegated to stand-by service, while No. 40's overhaul continued. On November 3, No. 1647 hauled its first excursion train outside the VALE, when it led a 45-mile (72 km) round trip over the Providence and Worcester Railroad's (P&W) former Norwich and Worcester mainline between Putnam, Connecticut, and Groton, Massachusetts, as part of the route's 150th anniversary.

=== Susquehanna steam program ===
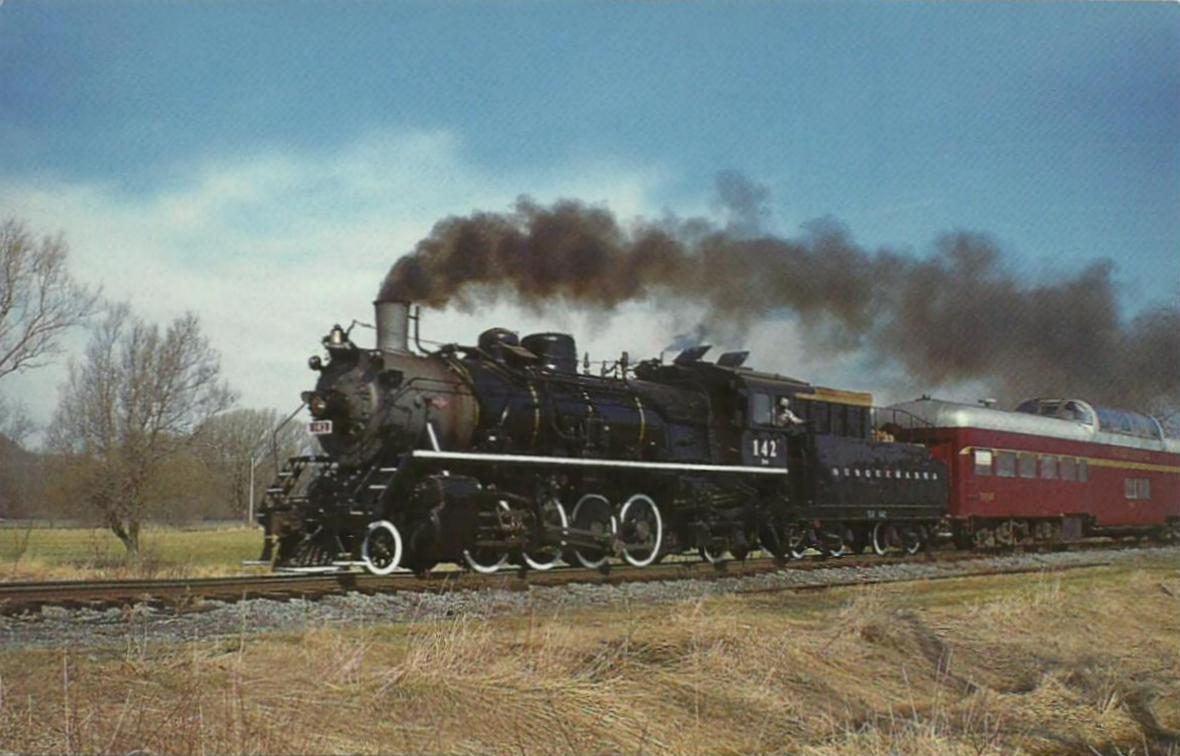
No. 142 hauling an excursion near Tully, New York in the 1990s

In 1989, the New York, Susquehanna and Western Railway (NYSW), a regional railway that had been heavily reorganized by the Delaware Otsego Corporation, began to explore ways to host a steam excursion program like those of the Union Pacific (UP) and Norfolk Southern (NS). Railroad officials initially planned to restore a pair of former Morris County Central locomotives, Nos. 385 and 4039, but after seeing the successful operation of SY Nos. 1647 and 1658, decided in 1990 to import their own Chinese locomotive. The company placed a $400,000 order for an SY equipped with some features that 1647 and 1658 were built without, including a separate back-up air tank and safety chains between the locomotive and tender.

The new locomotive was numbered SY-1698M, but at the suggestion of the NYSW Technical and Historical Society, the NYSW planned to renumber it as 141, following their previous new-build steam locomotive: No. 140, purchased in 1908. (Note: A second SY-1698 locomotive was built specifically for domestic usage in China, being assigned to the East China Aluminum plant in Lanxi.) SY-1698M ran successfully at the factory on December 27, 1990, but shipping was delayed for several months by the Gulf War. On May 16, 1991, the new locomotive was loaded on a Norwegian vessel, Braut Team, and four days later began its westbound voyage to the U.S. On June 6, the hull of Braut Team sprung a leak, while in transit in the Bay of Bengal, and the ship sank the following day. Its 17 crew members were rescued, but all of its cargo was lost, including SY-1698M.

While NYSW officials waited for a $400,000 insurance settlement claim, they mulled their options, including placing a new order with Tangshan and possibly having it shipped alongside another SY for the Western Maryland Scenic Railroad (WMSR). By November 1991, the VALE decided to sell their No. 1647 locomotive, since they had only used it as a stopgap while No. 40 was out of service, and as a demonstrator for the concept of adapting Chinese steam locomotives for American usage. The state of the economy of that time also contributed to the VALE's decision. The NYSW offered to buy No. 1647 with their insurance settlement, and the transaction was completed on December 2.

The NYSW opted to renumber No. 1647 as 142: one more than No. 1698's planned renumber. They also decided to reclassify it as an N-4, as a nod to the N-3 class 2-8-2s of the Erie Railroad, the Susquehanna's former parent company. On December 22, No. 1647 received its new number for publicity photos, and it hauled its final tourist train for the VALE. The following day, NYSW crews traveled to Essex to repaint the SY in its new Susquehanna livery. In January 1992, NYSW 142 was to be moved to the Susquehanna's shops in Utica, New York. Railroad officials eschewed the shorter route over track owned by Conrail, which charged $50 per mile for special moves, in favor of a longer route over smaller railroads.

On January 21, No. 142 left the VALE's Old Saybrook interchange on Amtrak's mainline. Over the next several days, the locomotive was ferried over the Central Vermont (CV), the Green Mountain Railroad (GMR), the Vermont Railway (VR), the Clarendon and Pittsford (C&P), and the Delaware and Hudson (D&H). From January 25 to 26, No. 142 stayed in Bellows Falls, Vermont, where it was filmed for a television film, Ethan Frome, collecting compensation that helped defray its ferry costs. On January 29, at Binghamton, No. 142 moved onto Susquehanna rails, and for the remainder of its journey to Utica, NYSW president Walter Rich served as the engineer.

On April 4, No. 142 hauled its first excursion trains for the NYSW. Five roundtrips on their Syracuse branch between Cortland and Marathon, New York, for the annual Marathon Maple Festival, and other roundtrips occurred on the same route, on April 5, 11, and 12. In October, No. 142 hauled Fall Foliage excursions between Butler, Hawthorne, and Sparta Junction in New Jersey. On May 15, 1993, No. 142 hauled a roundtrip excursion over the NYS&W's former 13-mile (21 km) Lackawanna line between Syracuse and Jamesville, New York—a fundraiser for a $1.2 million upgrade of the line for regular passenger service. On July 2, No. 142 hauled some roundtrip excursions between Hawthorne and Campgaw, New Jersey. Shortly thereafter, the locomotive was temporarily sent to Oakland, where it switched some tanker cars of liquid sweetener.

On July 30-31, 1994, No. 142 visited the Whippany Railway Museum in Whippany, New Jersey, alongside Black River and Western 60, and they both participated in their annual Whippany Railway Festival by hauling 16 excursions over the Morristown and Erie Railway (ME) between Whippany and Morristown. On September 21, No. 142 hauled an excursion that promoted the opening of the NYS&W's OnTrack shuttle commuter service between Syracuse and Jamesville.

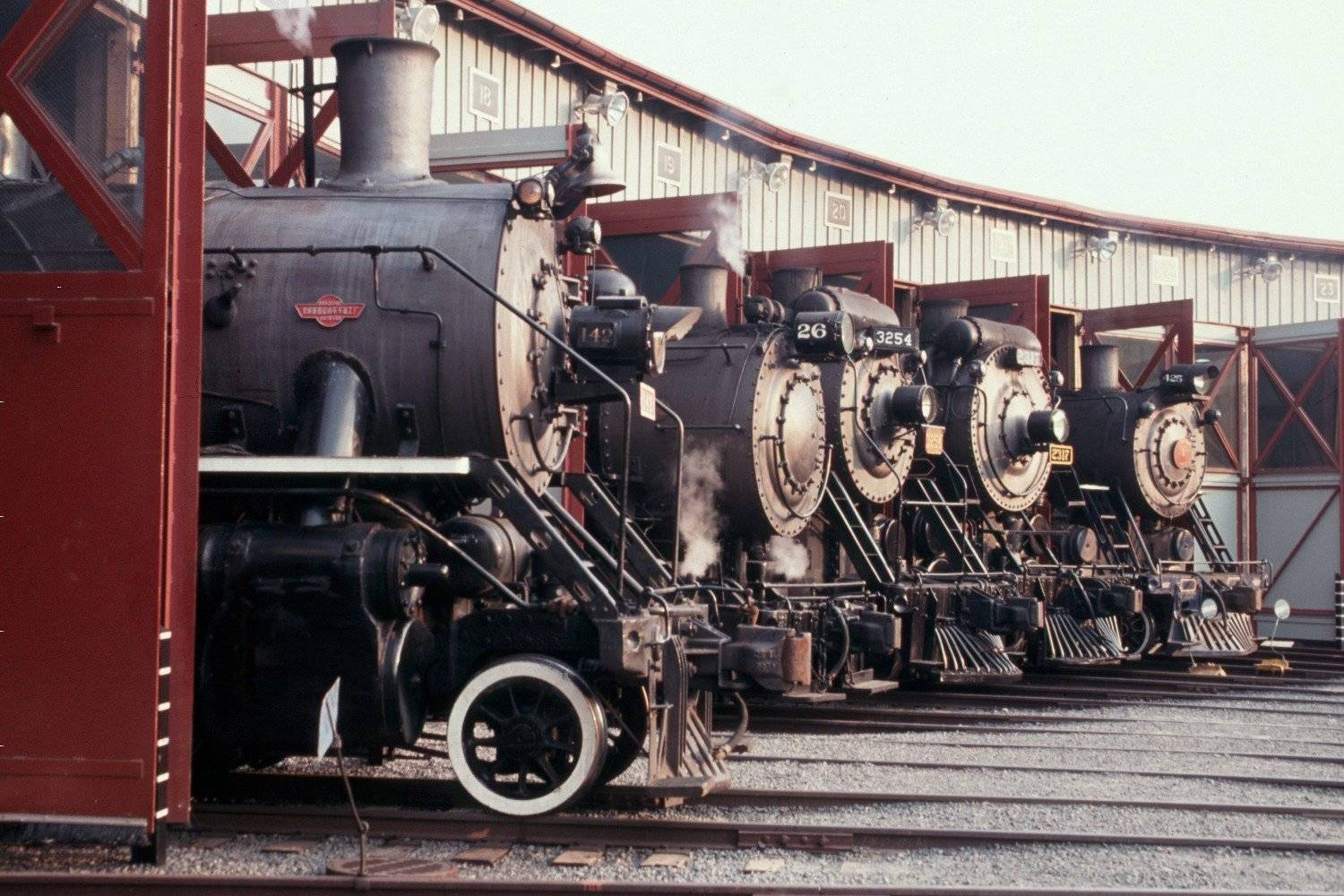
No. 142 at Steamtown's roundhouse with No. 26, No. 425, No. 2317 and No. 3254 on July 1, 1995

On June 30, 1995, No. 142, along with NYS&W EMD GP38 No. 2012 and recently-acquired EMD E9 No. 2400, hauled a 14-car excursion from Syracuse to Binghamton, and then traveled over the Canadian Pacific Railway's (CPR) former D&H mainline to Scranton, Pennsylvania. The excursion was co-sponsored by the NYSW, Railpace Newsmagazine, and Railfan & Railroad Magazine. On July 1, as part of the opening ceremony of Steamtown National Historic Site in Scranton, No. 142 participated in the "Grand Parade of Steam" event alongside Baldwin Locomotive Works 26, Canadian Pacific 2317, Canadian National 3254, Reading and Northern 425, and Milwaukee Road 261.

After the parade, No. 142 was to haul the NYSW's consist with No. 2400 for a round trip between Scranton and Moscow, but due to problems with installing a National Park Service (NPS) radio, No. 2317 led the round trip instead. Shortly after the ceremony, Nos. 142 and 2400 returned the consist to Syracuse. On August 19, No. 142 hauled another excursion from Syracuse to Chenango, where its consist was combined with a northbound excursion hauled by No. 261, and then the two locomotives doubleheaded to Syracuse. The following day, No. 142 hauled a round trip, between Syracuse and Tully. No. 142 was subsequently sent to Utica for an overhaul, but would remain in storage in for three years.

=== Reduced Susquehanna excursion service ===
In 1997, when it was announced that Conrail would be split between NS and CSX, the NYS&W—knowing the split would affect their intermodal operations—began to make corporate changes to save costs and to protect their overall freight business. One of the changes was the unceremonious cancellation of their steam program. The railroad sold the rights to operate No. 142 to the NYS&W Technical and Historical Society, but retained ownership of the locomotive. The historical society subsequently made plans to host their own public relations excursions with No. 142, labeled as "Steam on the Susquehanna".

In March 1998, No. 142's overhaul was completed, and it underwent another test fire. On the weekend of March 28-29, as part of that year's Marathon Maple Festival, No. 142 hauled some push-pull excursions with E9 No. 2402 and SD45 No. 3634, between Cortland and Marathon. On July 9, as part of the 1998 National Railway Historical Society (NRHS) Convention in Syracuse, No. 142 lead an excursion between Syracuse and Binghamton, with Lackawanna E8s Nos. 807 and 808 part of the consist, and for the return run, the E8s lead the train, while No. 142 was coupled to the opposite end, tender-first. The round trip was repeated, on July 11, but it only traveled as far as Chenango Forks.

Following the convention, No. 142 visited the GMR and the Vermont Railway for two and a half months, to haul a series of excursions on their trackage. In early October, No. 142 stayed in Bellows Falls, and took part in filming of The Cider House Rules, and since the film took place in Maine, the locomotive temporarily received Bangor and Aroostook lettering. No. 142 was subsequently ferried back to the NYSW, but on October 6, during the beginning of the journey, the locomotive had to assist a Vermont Railway GP18 with a freight train. On October 17-18, No. 142 was paired with Chesapeake and Ohio 614 to doublehead some Fall Foliage excursions over NJ Transit and Conrail between Hoboken, New Jersey and Port Jervis, New York.

In 1999, another schedule of excursions was planned for No. 142, but sometime that year, while No. 142 was being ferried from Utica to Chenango Forks, its left side cylinder suffered a catastrophic failure. The locomotive had to travel to Binghamton with only its right cylinder intact, and it subsequently had to be repaired. Throughout October and November, No. 142 hauled another series of Fall Foliage excursions between North Bergen and Warwick, and the trips were to help the Historical Society fund construction of a new locomotive shed to relocate No. 142. On September 10, 2000, No. 142 hauled an excursion over NJ Transit between Dunellen and High Bridge, and it was sponsored by the Dunellen Merchants and Professionals Association for their Dunellen Railroad Days event.

On June 16-17, 2001, No. 142 hauled some excursions between Butler and the Pequannock area as part of Butler's Centennial Celebrations. In September, No. 142 was to haul excursions for another Dunellen Railroad Days event, but NJ Transit cancelled the event after the September 11 attacks.

On September 7-8, 2002, No. 142 hauled Dunellen Railroad Days excursions over NJ Transit's Raritan Valley line. On September 28, No. 142 hauled four push-pull excursions with NYS&W Nos. 2400, 2402, and 2012 in the Lincoln Park Days event, over NJ Transit between Lincoln Park and Netcong. The following day, No. 142 led another Lincoln Park Days excursion, but before the return run, one of the locomotive's lubricator pipes fell off, leading a driving axle bearing to overheat and disintegrate. The three NYSW diesels covered the rest of that day's excursions. No. 142 was left for several weeks on a siding in Little Falls, then towed to Little Ferry. No drop pit was available, so crews pushed the locomotive over the side of a turntable pit and used a crane to remove its faulty axle, which was shipped to the Strasburg Rail Road to have its bearing replaced.

By May 2003, No. 142 was moved to the New York, Susquehanna and Western Technical and Historical Society's new shed in Butler, where it underwent some other repairs and had heat sensors installed for the bearings. By August 21, the repairs were completed, and No. 142 performed another test run between Butler and Limecrest. It subsequently hauled some Dunellen Railroad Days and Lincoln Park Days excursions. By year's end, the Susquehanna, which had been reducing its passenger operations as liability insurance costs rose, sold complete ownership of No. 142 to the Historical Society.

=== Bel-Del excursion service ===
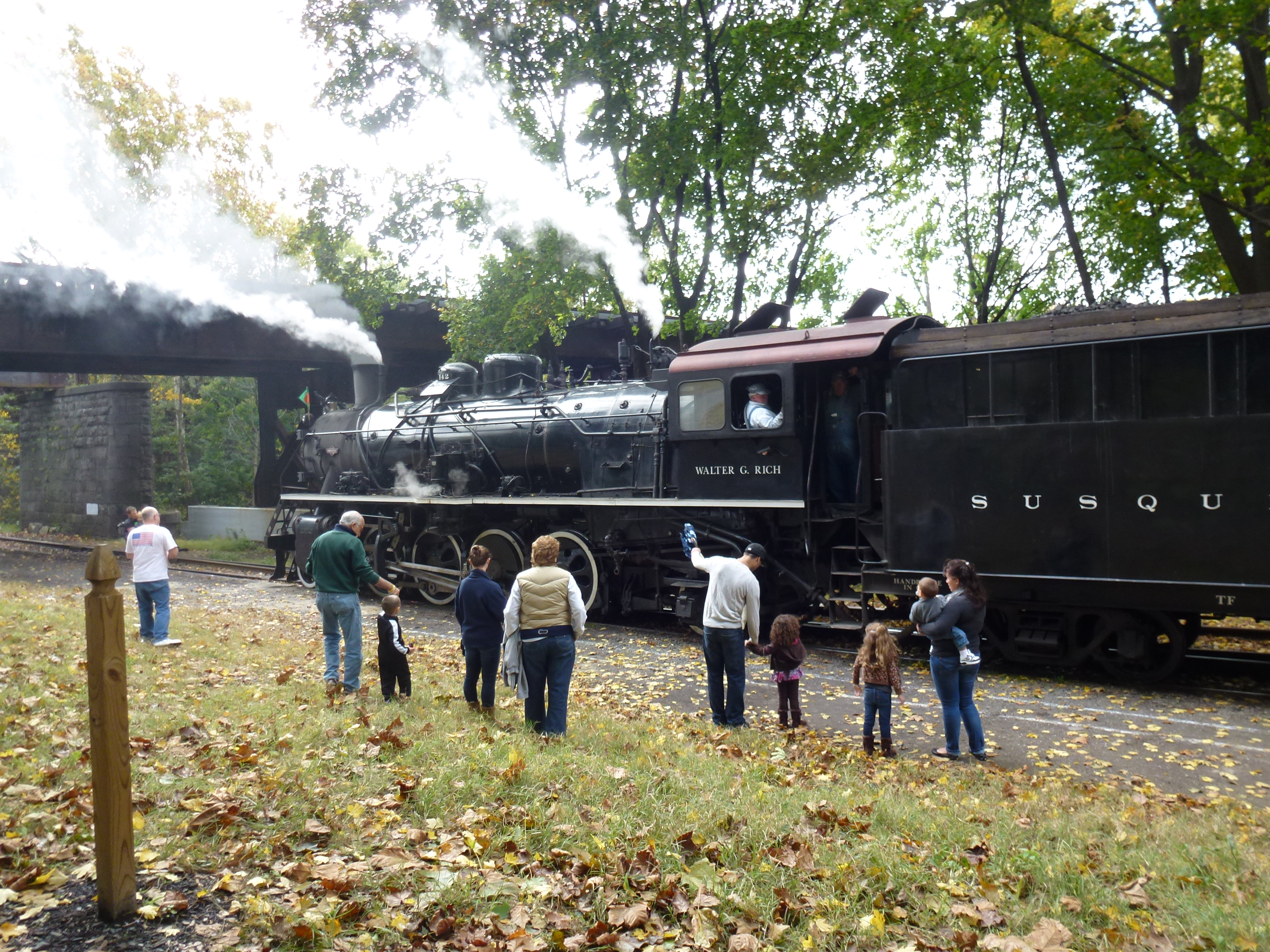
No. 142 preparing to haul an excursion on the Bel-Del Railway on October 20, 2012

In 2003, the town of Phillipsburg, New Jersey, and the Black River and Western Railroad (BRW) joined to redevelop a former Pennsylvania Railroad (PRR) right-of-way between Phillipsburg and Carpentersville as a tourist operation called the Belvidere and Delaware River Railway (Bel-Del). The NYSW Historical Society, which was searching for a place to regularly operate No. 142, joined the partnership to help plan their excursion services. On April 20, 2004, No. 142 operated out of Butler and over the Susquehanna and NJ Transit to Dover, and the following day, it was ferried with a Norfolk Southern local train to Phillipsburg.

On May 1, Bel-Del held its opening ceremony, and No. 142 hauled their six-car inaugural train. It hauled all of Bel-Del's weekend excursions until September 30. Shortly thereafter, the locomotive was ferried back to NJ Transit to participate in a Westfield Railroad Days event in Westfield. On October 2, No. 142 led the first of three push-pull excursions for the event, but its faulty driving axle bearing began to overheat again, and the sensors alerted the crews before it could disintegrate. The other two excursions were hauled by diesels, while No. 142 was towed to a NYSW siding to have the bearing removed.

Since No. 142 was scheduled to attend another special event later that month, NYS&W Historical Society crews opted to swiftly repair the locomotive before then, and crews from the Susquehanna, the Strasburg Rail Road, the New Hope and Ivyland, and other groups volunteered to help. The replacement bearing was found to be slightly too small for correct lubrication and problematic above 30 miles per hour (48 km/h), so Strasburg crews re-machined it to the correct size. On October 10, the fixed bearing was reinstalled, and No. 142 was quickly fired up and ferried to Binghamton with two Susquehanna diesels and twenty passenger cars.

On the weekend of October 16-17, No. 142 lead multiple push-pull excursions with the consist, as part of the 150th anniversary of the NYSW's Binghamton—Syracuse route, and no issues with the bearing were reported. No. 142 was then returned to Butler, for winter storage. In early 2005, No. 142 returned to Bel-Del to haul their excursions for that year's operating season. On December 31, 2005, construction began on a new Quonset-shaped locomotive shed in Carpentersville, to house and maintain No. 142 near Bel-Del. By December 2006, construction was temporarily subsided, when No. 142 had to be disassembled for its 1,472-day inspection, mandated by the Federal Railroad Administration (FRA).

Alstom officials, who had shut down their West Easton, Pennsylvania plant, agreed to allow the NYSW Historical Society to use one of their buildings for the remainder of No. 142's inspection. No. 142 was scheduled to return to service by May 1, 2007, but its reassembly was completed one month later. That same year, NYS&W president Walter Rich died, and his name was painted on the side of No. 142's cab.

In September 2017, No. 142 was due for another FRA-mandated 1,472-day overhaul, so it was removed from Bel-Del service and disassembled again. NYSW Historical Society crews decided to construct a larger shop facility in Phillipsburg, and when it was completed, No. 142 was moved inside to be overhauled alongside some passenger cars. During the overhaul, No. 142's boiler had to be reconditioned, and it received a new set of tubes. On August 6, 2024, the locomotive underwent a stationary test fire. In late September 2025, No. 142's rebuild was completed, and it returned to Bel-Del service on October 4.

== See also ==
- Nickel Plate Road 587
- Southern Railway 4501
- U.S. Sugar 148

== Bibliography ==
- Gibbons, Robin (2016). Locomotives of China - The JF6 Family - The JF6, PL2, YJ and SY Classes. United Kingdom: Tynedale Publishing. ISBN 978-0-9934192-1-8.
- Miller, Max R. (2017). Along the Valley Line: The History of the Connecticut Valley Railroad. Wesleyan University Press. ISBN 978-0-8195-7737-5.
- Tupaczewski, Paul R. (2002). New York, Susquehanna and Western In Color. Scotch Plains, New Jersey: Morning Sun Books, Inc. ISBN 1-58248-070-2.
- Forero, George; Vecchio, Mike Del (May 1992). "Steam Returns to the Susquehanna". Railfan & Railroad. Vol. 11, no. 5. Carstens Publications. pp. 48–51.

Media related to SY 1647 steam locomotive at Wikimedia Commons
