= Valley Railroad (Connecticut) =

Heritage railway in Connecticut, United States

- Essex Steam Train and Riverboat

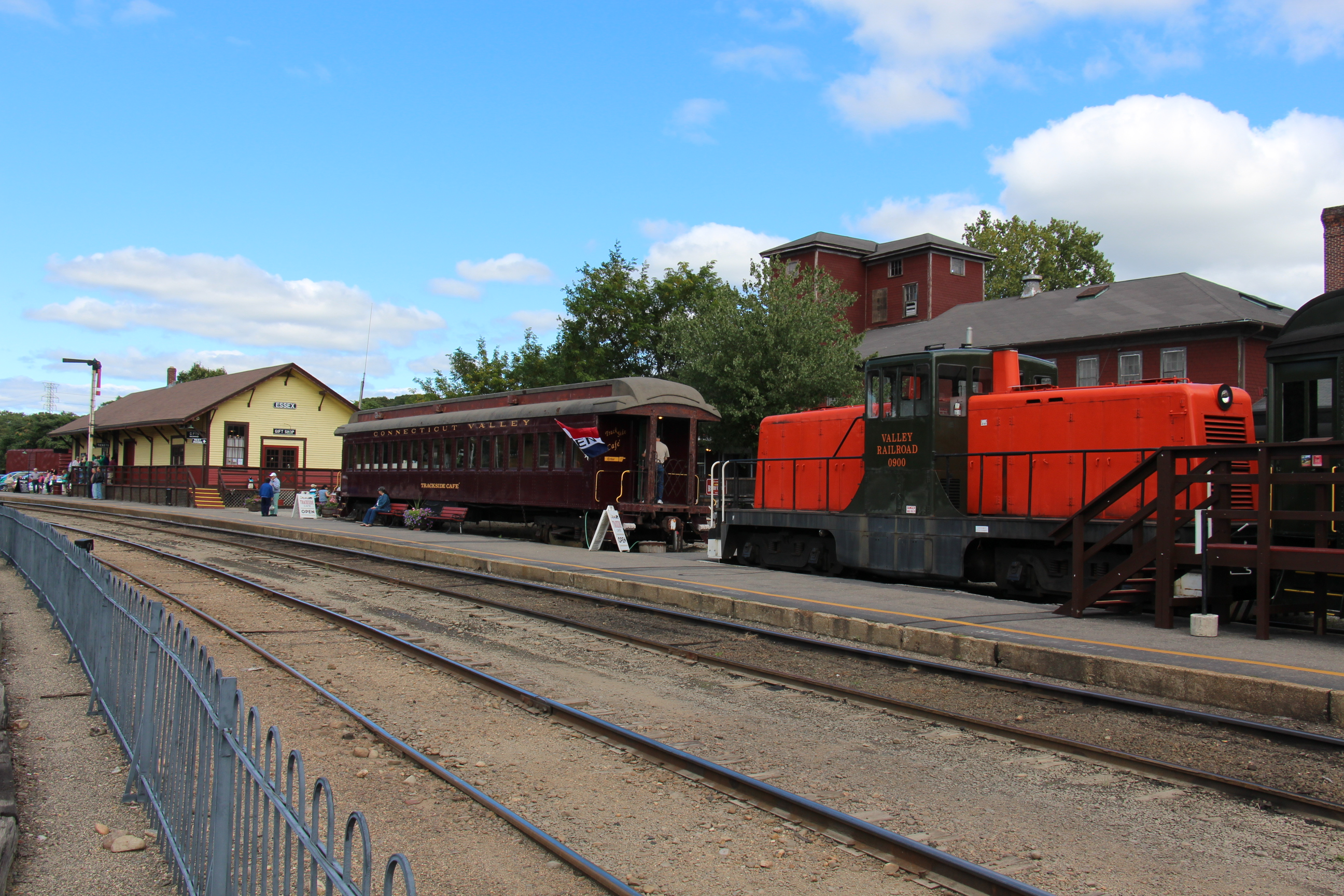
- The Essex depot and 80-ton switcher No. 0900 on September 14, 2013

Overview
- Headquarters: Essex, Connecticut
- Reporting mark: VALE
- Locale: Middlesex County, Connecticut
- Dates of operation: 1971–present
- Predecessor: Connecticut Valley Railroad; New York, New Haven and Hartford Railroad; Penn Central Transportation Company

Technical
- Track gauge: 1,435 mm (4 ft 8 1/2 in) standard gauge
- Length: 21.67 miles (34.87 km)

Other
- Website: essexsteamtrain.com

The Valley Railroad (reporting mark VALE), operating under the name Essex Steam Train and Riverboat, is a heritage railroad based in Essex, Connecticut on tracks of the Connecticut Valley Railroad, which was founded in 1868. The company began operations in 1971 between Deep River and Essex, and has since reopened additional parts of the former Connecticut Valley Railroad line. It operates the Essex Steam Train and the Essex Clipper Dinner Train.

== History ==
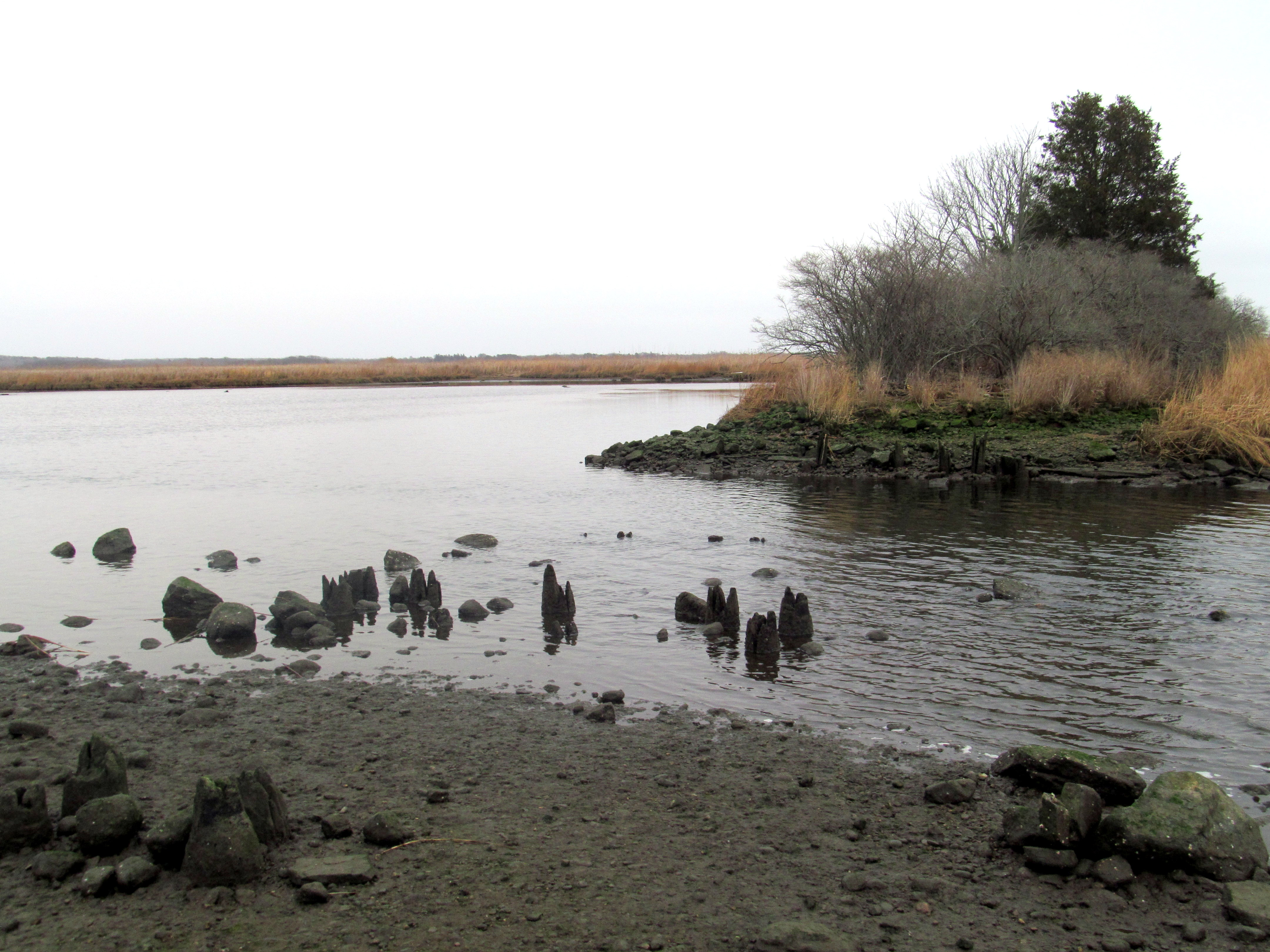
Remains of a wooden bridge along the former Fenwick Branch south of Old Saybrook, which was abandoned in the early 20th century

=== Construction ===
The vision of a Valley Railroad started in the 1840s when President of the Charter Oak Life Insurance Company, James Clark Walkley traced the 44-mile route by stagecoach with friend Horace Johnson. Walkley and a group of business men obtained a state charter on July 17, 1868, to form the Connecticut Valley Railroad Company and start the process of building a railroad.

During 1868–1869, survey crews worked to map out the line from Hartford, Connecticut, to Saybrook Point.

In April 1870, construction of the line began, with ground breaking taking place in Higganum, Connecticut. The plan called for three phases, the "Northern Division" starting in Hartford and continuing to Middletown, the "Middle Division" which continued to what is known today as Goodspeed Landing, and the "South Division" which finished the line to Saybrook Point. The Connecticut River Valley allowed for an easy construction, as no tunnels or major bridges were required. The line was completed during the summer of 1871 with the first ceremonial train run over the 45 miles (72 km) on July 29, 1871, at a steady speed of 22 mph. At $34,000 per mile, the line ended up costing $1,482,903.

=== Connecticut Valley Railroad ===
The first "regular" train started on July 31, 1871. On August 24, 1871, the Connecticut Valley Railroad declared an official opening. The schedules of trains operating along the Valley Railroad called for one mixed train and four passenger trains each way daily (except Sunday) with fifteen stops along the way.

The company grossed $34,000 in its first year. It continued to grow, grossing $250,000/year in 1873.

Financial trouble plagued many early railroads, and the Connecticut Valley defaulted in 1876 on its second mortgage bonds and was placed in receivership.

=== Hartford & Connecticut Valley Railroad ===
On July 1, 1880, the Hartford and Connecticut Valley Railroad took control with president Samuel Babcock.

By 1888, the H&CV was purchased by the New York New Haven & Hartford Railroad and became known as its "Valley Division". Passenger service ended in stages: between Saybrook Point and Fenwick in 1917, between Fenwick and Saybrook Junction in 1922, between Saybrook Junction and Middletown in 1930, and Middletown and Hartford in 1933.

=== Valley Railroad Company (Present Day Company) ===
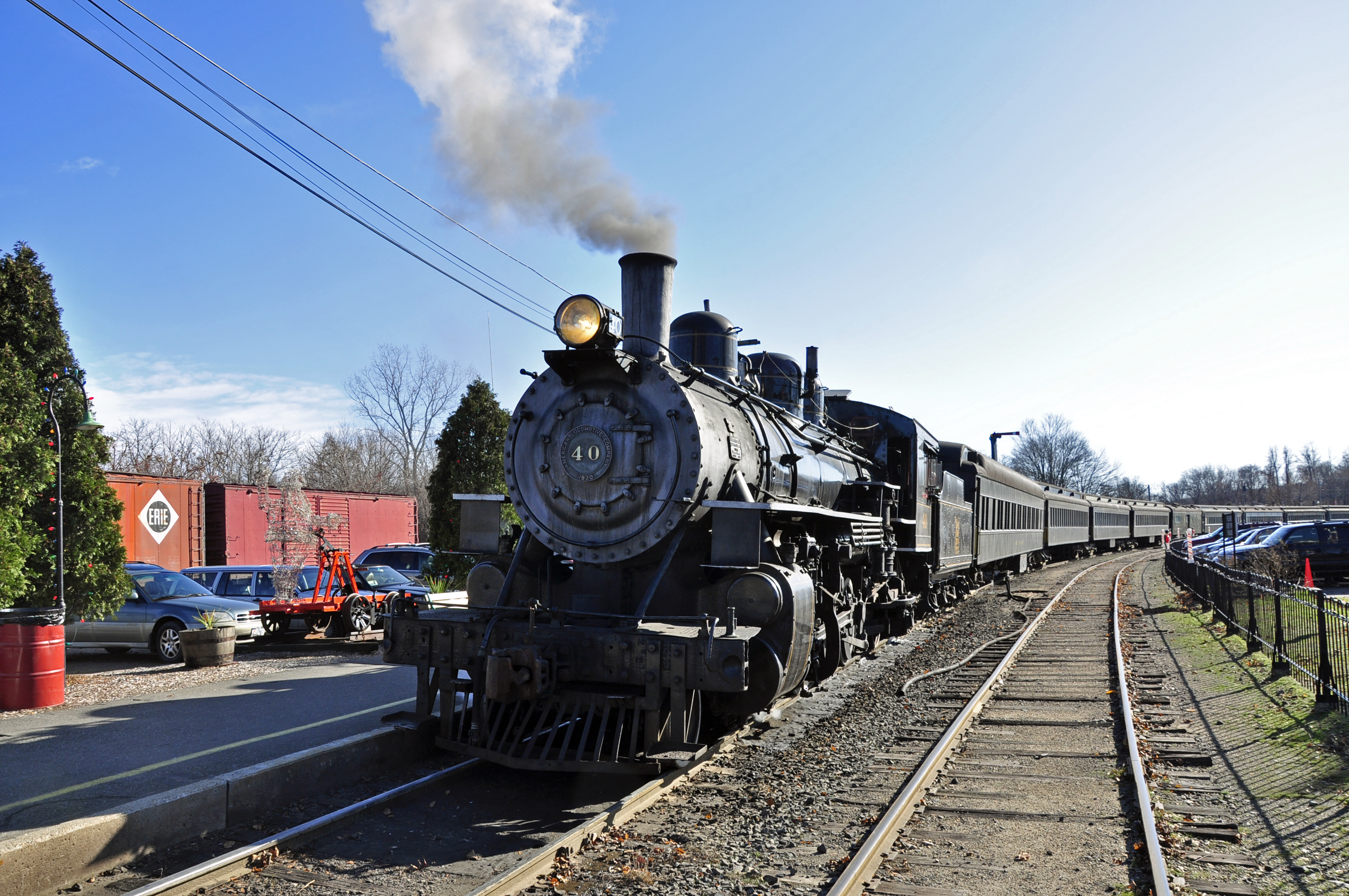
No. 40 awaiting to depart with a passenger train at Essex station

The south end of the Valley Line, from the mainline at Saybrook Junction to Maromas in Middletown was abandoned in March 1968, by the New York, New Haven and Hartford Railroad several months before merging into Penn Central in 1969. Penn Central had the Valley Line put up for abandonment on August 15, 1969. The Valley Line was saved by the Connecticut Valley Railroad Association (CVRA, later becoming Railroad Museum of New England) due to concerns of the abandoned branch line being torn up by the Penn Central. The Connecticut Valley Railroad Association, the Empire State Railway Museum, and private investors created today's for-profit Valley Railroad, obtaining a charter from the Connecticut State Legislature. The State of Connecticut took ownership of the line from the Penn Central on June 1, 1970, and designated the Valley line as a linear State Park. It reopened on July 29, 1971, with ESRM's No. 103 being the first locomotive to run on the current Valley Railroad with a train running between Essex and Deep River, 100 years to the day of the first train on the original line. The train was later expanded to Chester in the late 1970s and expanded as far north as Haddam in later years.

Seasonally, trains connect with a riverboat at Deep River, which offers rides along the Connecticut River.

== Facilities ==
=== Track ===
The Valley Railroad Company leases, from the Connecticut Department of Energy and Environmental Protection, the track running from Old Saybrook up through Essex, Deep River, Chester, Haddam, and Middletown, totaling 21.67 miles (34.87 km). The trackbed is gravel ballast, with track made of conventional wood crossties, with steel rails fastened to the ties. A major project funded by the company in 2015 put all mainline track from Essex (MP 4) to North Chester (MP 9.80) in stone ballast. The track connects with Amtrak's Northeast Corridor track near the Old Saybrook Station to the south. Presently, 14.25 miles of the line are restored for train service, with the remaining last seeing service in 1968. The rail corridor between Haddam and Middletown, which has been cleared of brush and receives property maintenance and surveillance from hi-rail vehicles, is undergoing full restoration as time and funding permit.

The Valley Railroad Company has several grade crossings along its tracks. They vary in their nature, ranging from small caution signs at private crossings to flashing lights, at public crossings. The busiest public grade crossings are located at Route 153 in Essex, Route 154 in Essex, and Route 82 (just before the East Haddam swing bridge) in Haddam, which have gates as well as flashing lights.

=== Stations ===
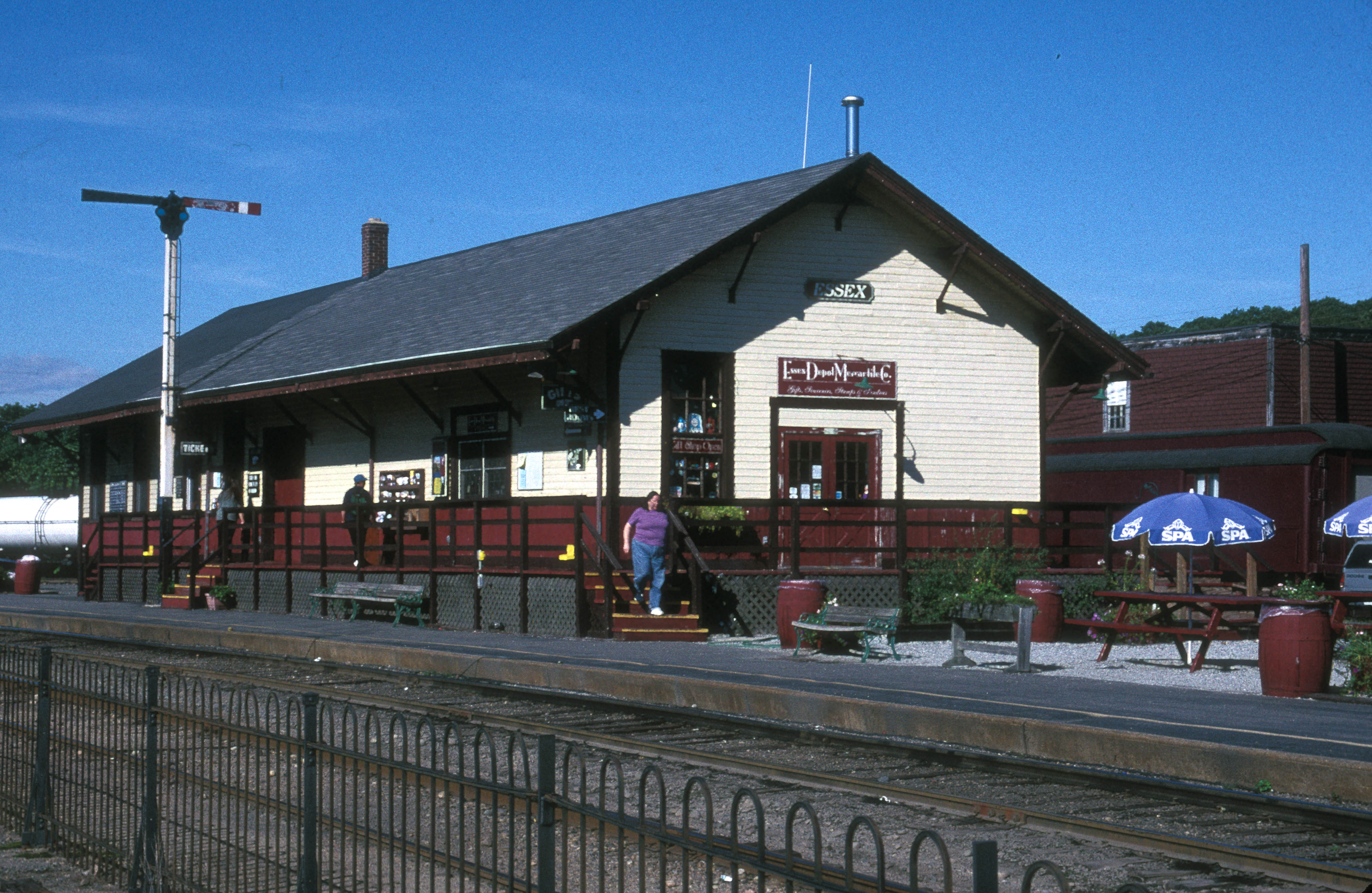
The railroad's main station in Essex.

The main station, where tickets are sold and all rolling stock is kept, is located in Essex; specifically, the village of Centerbrook. The main entrance and parking access is located off Route 154; there is a rear entrance (not for public use) on Route 153. There is a station building (used as offices for the riverboat operation) at Deep River Landing in Deep River, and a small station (used by the Railroad's track department) in Chester—it was originally the station at Quinnipiac, Connecticut. Goodspeed station, located off Route 82 in Haddam, houses an antique shop and is not affiliated with the railroad. Across the tracks from the station is the Goodspeed Yard Office. This building was the original Chester passenger station, located on Dock Road in Chester, but sold off and removed in 1874 when it was found that the railroad grade was too steep at that location for starting and stopping trains. Donated by the Zanardi family in 1993, it was retrieved by volunteers of the Friends of the Valley Railroad and moved by flatcar to its present location. It is believed that this structure is the sole remaining passenger station from the 1871 opening of the railroad.

On July 18, 2009, the Friends of the Valley Railroad built a passenger shelter in Chester on the site of the original Hadlyme station. The new building is a reproduction of the South Britain station, which was on the now abandoned Danbury Extension of the Hartford, Providence & Fishkill. The original station on this site served passengers of the town of Hadlyme, across the Connecticut River. Passengers use today's station to go to Gillette Castle State Park via the Chester-Hadlyme Ferry, the second-oldest continuously-operated ferry route in the United States.

== Equipment ==
=== Locomotives ===
Locomotive details (Note: Attributed to multiple sources:)
Number	Image	Type	Model	Built	Builder	Status
2		Steam	0-6-0T	1941	H.K. Porter, Inc.	Display
3		Steam	0-4-0F	1930	H.K. Porter	Display, at Westbrook Outlet Mall
40		Steam	2-8-2	1920	American Locomotive Company	Operational
97		Steam	2-8-0	1923	American Locomotive Company	Operational
3025		Steam	2-8-2	1989	Tangshan Locomotive and Rolling Stock Works	Undergoing 1,472-day inspection and overhaul
0900		Diesel	80-ton switcher	1947	GE Transportation	Display
0901		Diesel	80-ton switcher	1940	GE Transportation	Operational
0902		Diesel	80-ton switcher	1953	GE Transportation	Operational
0903		Diesel	80-ton switcher	1940s	Transportation	Display
0904		Diesel	80-ton switcher	1940s	GE Transportation	Operational
0905	(small)px	Diesel	80-ton switcher	1953	GE Transportation	Operational

=== Former units ===
Locomotive details
Number	Image	Type	Model	Built	Builder	Owner
10		Steam	0-4-0T	1934	Baldwin Locomotive Works	Connecticut Eastern Railroad Museum, Willimantic, CT
103		Steam	2-6-2	1925	Baldwin Locomotive Works	Railroad Museum of New England/Naugatuck Railroad, Thomaston, CT
1246		Steam	4-6-2	1946	Montreal Locomotive Works	Railroad Museum of New England/Naugatuck Railroad, Thomaston, CT
1647	frsmeless	Steam	2-8-2	1989	Tangshan Locomotive and Rolling Stock Works	NS&WT&HS/Belvidere and Delaware River Railway, Phillipsburg, NJ
15		Diesel	RS-1	1944	American Locomotive Company	None (scrapped)
240		Diesel	RS-1	1945	American Locomotive Company	None (scrapped)
0800		Diesel	44-ton switcher	1950	Unknown	Connecticut Eastern Railroad Museum, Willimantic, CT
7145		Diesel	80-ton switcher	1942	GE Transportation	None (scrapped)

=== Rolling stock ===
Rolling stock details
Name / Number	Image	Type	Built	Builder	Status
Great Republic		Parlor car	1930	Pullman Company	Operational
Meriden		Dining/parlor car	1924	Pullman	Operational
Wallingford		Dining/parlor car	1927	Pullman Company	Operational
Goodspeed		Dining/parlor car	1927	Pullman Company	Operational
Middletown		Parlor/dining/observation car	1924	Pullman Company	Operational
Toreador		Parlor car	1913	Pullman Company	Out of Service
810 (Lindsay)		Sleeper	1923	Canadian Car and Foundry	Out of service
301		Parlor car	Unknown	Unknown	Operational
302		Coach	Unknown	Unknown	Operational
400		HEP power car	1920	American Car and Foundry	Operational
401		Coach	1952	Canadian Car and Foundry	Operational
402		Parlor car	1952	Canadian Car and Foundry	Operational
403		Parlor car	1952	Canadian Car and Foundry	Operational
404		Parlor car	1952	Canadian Car and Foundry	Operational
500 (Fenwick)		Parlor car	1914	Pullman Company	Operational
501		Coach	1915	Pullman Company	Operational
502		Coach	1914	Pullman Company	Operational
503		Coach	1914	Pullman Company	Operational
600 (Riverview)		Open car/parlor/dining car	1917	Pullman Company	Operational
601		Coach	1917	Pullman Company	Operational
602		Coach	1917	Pullman Company	Operational
603		Coach	1920	Pullman Company	Operational
1000 (Putnam)		Coach	1924	Bethlehem Steel	Operational
1001	frsmeless	Coach	1925	Bethlehem Steel	Operational
1002		Coach	1924	Bethlehem Steel	Operational
4979		Coach	Unknown	Unknown	Out of service
Colonial Hearth	frsmeless	Kitchen car	1953	St. Louis	Operational
70383		Boxcar	1949	Unknown	Stored, out of service
86302		Boxcar	1952	Pullman-Standard	Display
061		Boxcar	1955	Unknown	Stored, out of service
272		Hopper car	1959	Unknown	Display
728		Gondola car	1917	L&NE Shops	Display
5146		Flatcar	c. 1910	Unknown	Maintenance of way
5151		Flatcar	c. 1910	Unknown	Operational
6364		Boxcar	1951	Unknown	Storage, display
9435		Boxcar	1961	Unknown	Stored, display
9496		Boxcar	1961	Unknown	Stored
9819		Boxcar	1951	Unknown	Out of service
9861		Boxcar	1951	Unknown	Stored
213173		Boxcar	1930	Unknown	Operational
54173		Autom.	1930	Dispatch Shops	Display
94460		Tanker car	c. 1950	UTCCO.	Display
39159		Flatcar	1952	PSCo	Maintenance of way
20088		Hopper car	1912	Unknown	Display
35386		Boxcar	1948	Pullman Company	Stored, display
17704		Flatcar	1953	GSC/Readville	Operational
W-2		Crane	1946	American Locomotive Company	Maintenance of way
W-10		Crane	1946	American Locomotive Company	Maintenance of way
H-50		Crane	1927	American Locomotive Company	Out of service
D-75		Dump car	1953	Magor	Operational
None		Snow Plow	c. 1913	HT&W Shops	Display
97		Tender	1923	American Locomotive Company	Out of service

=== Riverboats ===
Riverboat details
Name	Image	Type	Built	Builder	Status
Becky Thatcher		Riverboat	1961	69’ Motor Vessel Captain A. Starts	Operational

== Accidents and incidents ==
- On April 22, 1990, No. 1647 ran at low speed into the rear of the idling North Cove Express dinner train on the passing trackage. Ten minor injuries were reported, and a damaged coupler on one of the cars had to be replaced.
- In April 2024, two persons were charged with the theft of four tenths of a mile of track along the operating portion of the line. Eyewitnesses observed track being dismantled near Old Saybrook and the pair are alleged to have removed and sold the track to local metal recyclers. The state of Connecticut has since repaired the damaged section.

== Appearances in media ==
The Valley Railroad makes an appearance in Indiana Jones and the Kingdom of the Crystal Skull with 2-8-0 97 appearing in some scenes of the film. It again appears several times in the Hallmark 2021 production Next Stop, Christmas. Earlier movies including Amistad, Ragtime, and Malcolm X were also filmed in part at the Valley Railroad.

== See also ==
- Connecticut Valley Railroad Roundhouse and Turntable Site
- Deep River Freight Station
- Essex Freight Station
- List of Connecticut state parks
- List of heritage railroads in the United States
