= Valley Railroad 3025 =

Exported SY class 2-8-2 steam locomotive

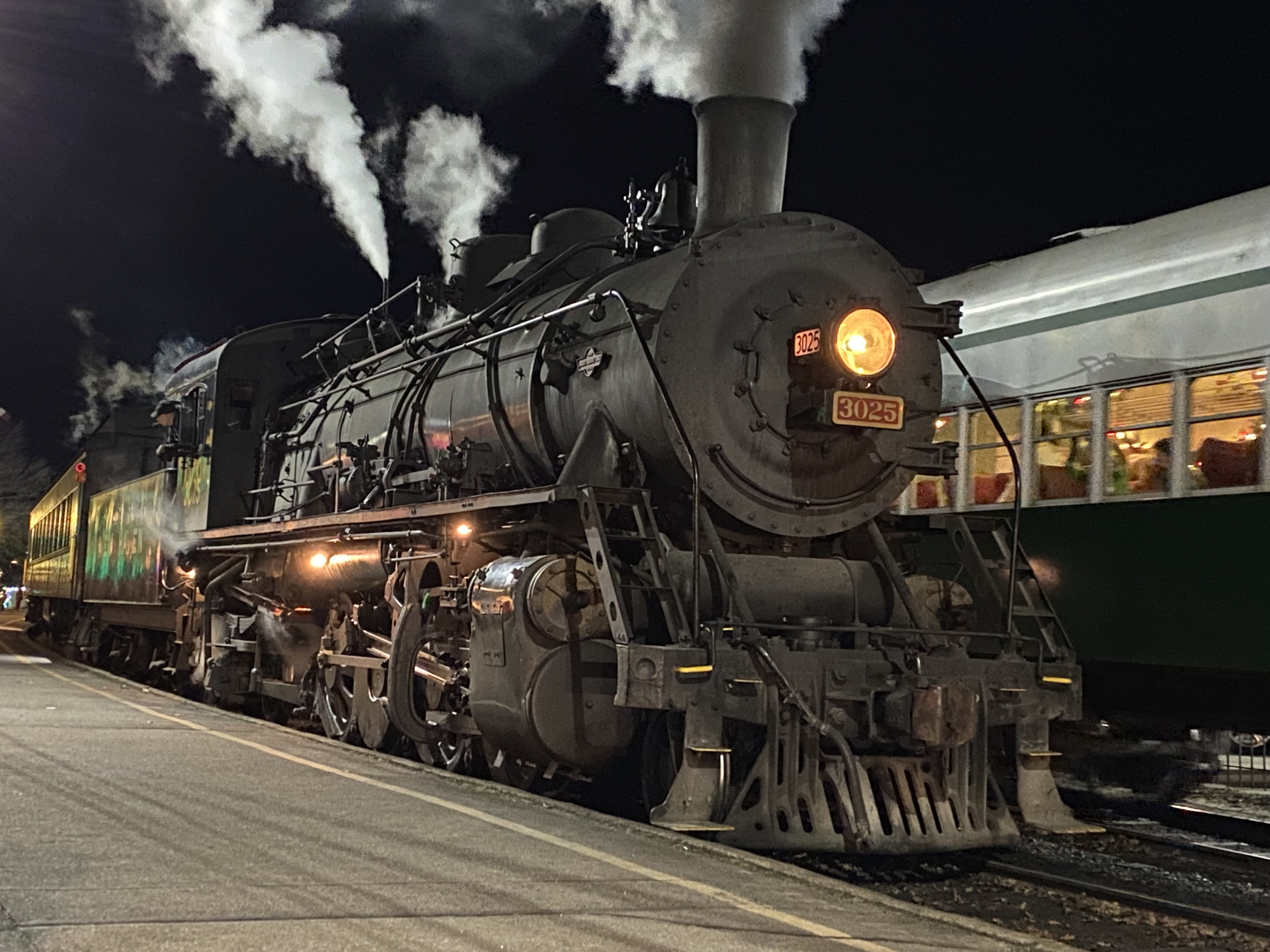
- No. 3025 waiting to depart Essex with the North Pole Express excursion, December 17, 2021
Type and origin
- Power type: Steam
- Builder: Tangshan Locomotive and Rolling Stock Works
- Serial number: SY-1658M
- Model: SY
- Build date: July 1989
Specifications
- Configuration
  - Whyte: 2-8-2
  - UIC: 1’D1’
- Gauge: 4 ft 8 1/2 in (1,435 mm) standard gauge
- Leading dia.: 840 mm (33 in; 2.76 ft)
- Driver dia.: 1,370 mm (54 in; 4.49 ft)
- Trailing dia.: 1,000 mm (39 in; 3.3 ft)
- Wheelbase
  - Engine: 31 ft 4 in (9.55 m)
  - Drivers: 14 ft 6 in (4.42 m)
- Length: 21,643 mm (852.1 in; 71.007 ft)
- Width: 3,300 mm (130 in; 10.8 ft)
- Height: 4,446 mm (175.0 in; 14.587 ft)
- Adhesive weight: 15 t (33,000 lb; 15,000 kg)
- Loco weight: 84 t (185,000 lb; 84,000 kg)
- Tender weight: 54.5 t (120,000 lb; 54,500 kg)
- Fuel type: New: Coal; Now: Oil (post-current overhaul)
- Fuel capacity: 9.5 t (21,000 lb; 9,500 kg)
- Water cap.: 25,000 L (6,600 US gal)
- Firebox
  - Grate area: 4.57 m^{2} (49.2 sq ft)
- Boiler pressure: 210 psi (1,400 kPa)
- Heating surface: 161 m^{2} (1,733.0 sq ft)
- Superheater
  - Heating area: 65.5 m^{2} (705.0 sq ft)
- Cylinders: Two, outside
- Cylinder size: 530 mm × 710 mm (21 in × 28 in)
- Valve gear: Walschaerts
- Valve type: Piston valves
- Loco brake: Air
- Train brakes: Air
- Couplers: Knuckle
Performance figures
- Maximum speed: 50 mph (80.47 km/h)
- Power output: 1,500 hp (1,100 kW)
- Tractive effort: 20,475 kgf (45,140 lbf; 200.79 kN)
- Factor of adh.: 4.05
Career
- Operators: Knox and Kane Railroad; Valley Railroad
- Class: SY
- Numbers: KKRR 1658; KKRR 58; NH 3025; VALE 3025
- Delivered: December 17, 1989
- First run: May 19, 1990 (Inaugural KKRR run); November 17, 2011 (VALE test run)
- Retired: October 2004
- Restored: November 14, 2011
- Current owner: Valley Railroad
- Disposition: Undergoing 1,472-day inspection and overhaul

Valley Railroad 3025 is a China Railways SY class 2-8-2 "Mikado" type steam locomotive. It was built in July 1989 by the Tangshan Locomotive and Rolling Stock Works as SY-1658M, it was exported to the Knox and Kane Railroad (KKRR) in the United States. In 1990, No. 1658 began hauling tourist trains for the KKRR between Marienville, Kane, and Mount Jewett, Pennsylvania, and it often operated over the railroad's primary attraction, the Kinzua Bridge. By 2004, the locomotive was put into storage, following a decline in ridership on the KKRR.

In March 2008, No. 1658 sustained heavy damage when the shed it was stored in was burned by arsonists. In October, it was sold at an auction to the Valley Railroad (VALE), who shipped it to their Essex, Connecticut location and rebuilt it to cosmetically resemble a New Haven locomotive. Renumbered as No. 3025, the locomotive returned to service, in 2011, and it began hauling tourist trains for the VALE.

== Background ==
=== Design ===
No. 3025's original class, the Chinese SY (abbreviation for Shàng Yóu (上有), Chinese for "Aim High") locomotive, was a development from the JF6 class, which in turn was a variant of the heavier ALCO-designed JF1 class. The SYs received some design features the JF1s and JF6s lacked, including taller smokestacks, alternate motion bracket arrangements, a higher boiler pressure (210 psi (1,400 kPa)), a lower axle loading (15 tonnes (33,000 lb)), and all boxpok driving wheels. Their tender tanks, which carried 9.5 tonnes (21,000 pounds) of coal and 25,000 liters (6,600 U.S. gal) of water, were designed with sloped-back sides for improved rearward vision for crews, since the SYs often operated in reverse.

The first SY (SY-0001) was completed by the Tangshan Locomotive and Rolling Stock Works in 1960, with production by Tangshan and other manufacturers continuing until 1999, at which over 1,800 SY locomotives had been built. In service, the SYs were primarily used for freight and switching services in Chinese mining and industrial areas, such as coal mines, iron ore mines, steel mills, and power stations. The SYs also hauled passenger trains for workers on long-distance industrial rail networks.

=== K&K Railroad formation ===
In August 1987, the Knox and Kane Railroad (K&K), a shortline railroad that operated low-cost freight trains over former Baltimore and Ohio Railroad (B&O) trackage in Northwestern Pennsylvania, began operating tourist trains between Marienville, Kane, and Mount Jewett, a distance of 97 miles (156 km). In Mount Jewett, they used some former Erie trackage to travel across their primary attraction, the Kinzua Bridge, which was one of the tallest railroad bridges in the United States, with a height of 301 feet (92 m) and a length of 2,052 feet (625 m). The railroad initially operated five-car passenger trains, led by Huntingdon and Broad Top 38. During the 1988 operating season, the K&K carried over 17,000 passengers.

== History ==
=== Construction and export ===
In 1988, the Connecticut Valley Railroad (VALE) announced that they would import a new steam locomotive from China, since Chinese steam locomotives shared identical specifications with American locomotives, and they were still being mass-produced at the time. Other tourist railroad operators quickly considered following suit, including the KKRR's owner and operator, Sloan Cornell. Additionally, the Arizona-based Grand Canyon Railway (GCR) looked into acquiring some American-built KD7 class 2-8-0s. Cornell approached the Tangshan Locomotive and Rolling Stock Works and placed a $350,000 order for a locomotive with matching specifications and modifications to SY-1647M, the VALE's new locomotive.

The KKRR's new locomotive was a copy of Tangshan's SY class, and it was numbered SY-1658M —'M' indicated its planned shipment to America. (Note: A second SY-1658 locomotive was built specifically for domestic usage in China, being assigned to work at the Hanson Iron and Steel works. As of 2024, SY-1658 is preserved at Handan East railway station.) Its boiler design had to be altered to meet both the American Society of Mechanical Engineers (ASME) boiler code and Federal Railroad Administration (FRA) regulations; a stock-standard Chinese steam locomotive was not permitted to operate in the Northeastern U.S., due to certain construction methods. The firebox sheets had to be thickened, the crownsheet staybolts had to be enlarged, and the welding technique for assembling the boiler sections had to be altered. The engineer's controls in the cab also had to be repositioned from the left side to the right side.

In July 1989, construction on the new SY-1658M locomotive was completed. For several months, there were delays in shipping SY-1658M and SY-1647M, along with the Boone and Scenic Valley Railroad's stock-standard JS class No. 8419, since that year's Tiananmen Square massacre caused difficulties in securing a ship. GCR backed out of their KD7 acquisitions, since they were unwilling to wait out the ordeal. In September, one ship was secured, the M.V. Trade Fir, and the two SYs were loaded on board in Dalian, while No. 8419 was loaded in Qingdao, and then the three locomotives were shipped eastward across the Pacific Ocean. In November, No. 8419 was unloaded at Long Beach, California, and the following month, on December 17, the M.V. Trade Fir was docked at the Port of Camden in New Jersey, where the two SY locomotives were unloaded onto the Beckett Street Terminal. They were subsequently shipped over Conrail to their respective destinations.

=== KKRR excursion service ===
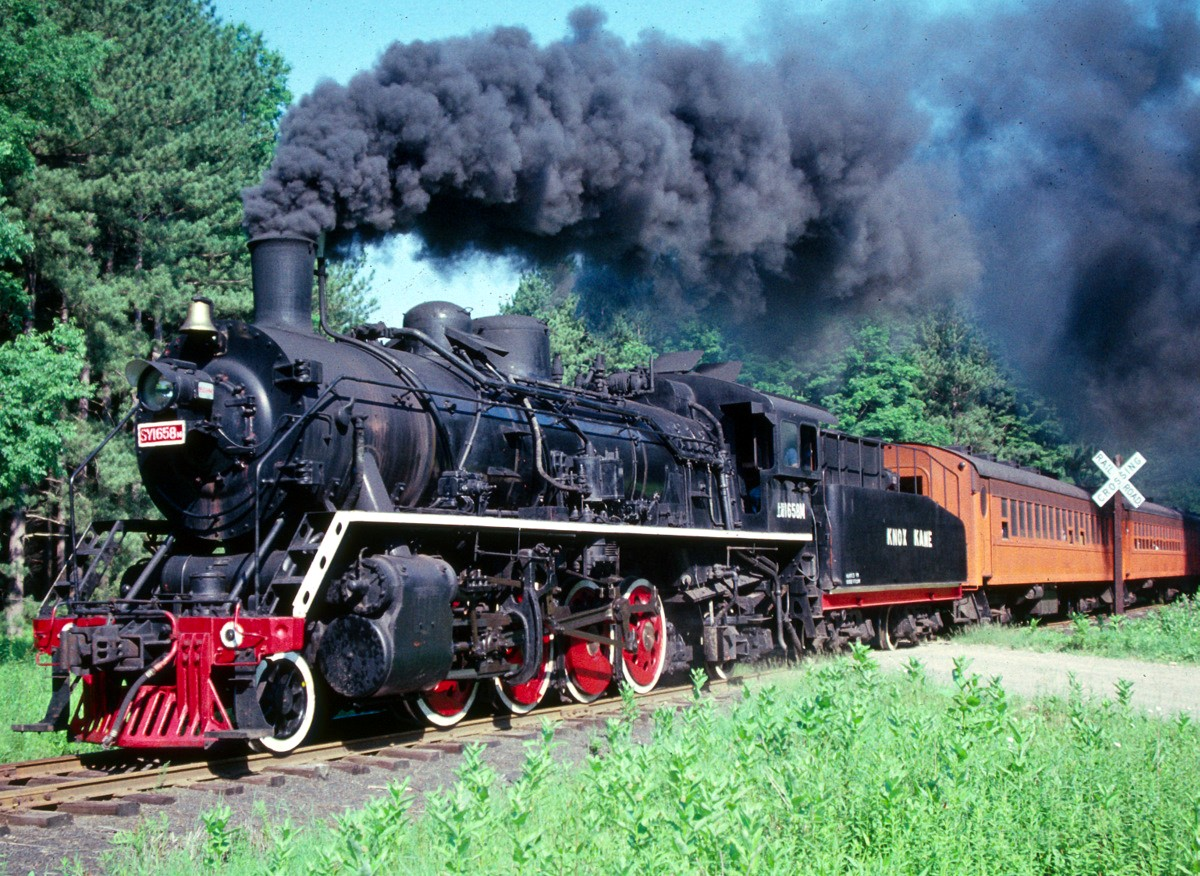
No. 1658 hauling an excursion train on the KKRR, July 1990

In early 1990, SY-1658M arrived at the KKRR, and on May 19, it hauled its inaugural train for the railroad. No. 1658 would travel at 15 miles per hour (24 km/h) through the Allegheny National Forest, between Marienville and Mount Jewett, and at Mount Jewett, it would operate over the Kinzua Bridge for sightseers and photographers. Operating the SY in excursion service was quickly deemed a success, as Cornell became impressed with its improved performance and efficiency. No. 1658 subsequently became the KKRR's only operable steam locomotive, while No. 38 was out of service for repairs. Sometime during its service on the KKRR, No. 1658's road number was shortened to 58.

On June 27, 2002, the Pennsylvania Department of Conservation and Natural Resources (DCNR) banned all trains from crossing the Kinzua Bridge after it was determined that the deteriorating bridge was at risk of collapse from heavy winds. The KKRR's excursions were consequently shortened to stop right before the bridge, and diesels had to begin hauling the trains instead of No. 58, since the wye used to turn the locomotive was on the other side. The loss of the scenic trip over the bridge and the absence of a steam locomotive slowly began to affect the KKRR's excursion ridership.

In February 2003, workers from an Ohio-based construction and repair company began to restore and stabilize the Kinzua Bridge to eventually reopen it for the KKRR. On July 21, after all of the workers left for the day, a major storm spawned a tornado which struck the bridge, resulting in eleven of its twenty support towers toppling over. Rebuilding the bridge from its collapsed state was deemed too costly by state officials, so they instead left the ruins on display as a demonstration of the forces of nature. Following the collapse, the KKRR experienced a 75% decline in passenger ridership, and No. 58 was already left in storage in Kane, awaiting a mandated 1,472-day inspection. Sloan Cornell consequently decided to suspend all of the KKRR's excursions in October 2004, and his remaining freight operations followed suit by 2006.

In the early morning of March 16, 2008, an arsonist approached the K&K's equipment shed in Kane and set it on fire, with their remaining locomotives still inside. No. 58 received major exterior damage, with paint being scorched off of its boiler and tender tank, and its original wide cab was damaged beyond repair. Most of the locomotive's interior mechanical parts remained intact. The arson attack cost the KKRR over $1 million in damage, and all negotiations to reopen the railroad were quickly dropped. Sloan Cornell decided to sell off all of the KKRR's remaining equipment, and an auction was held on October 10–11.

=== VALE excursion service ===
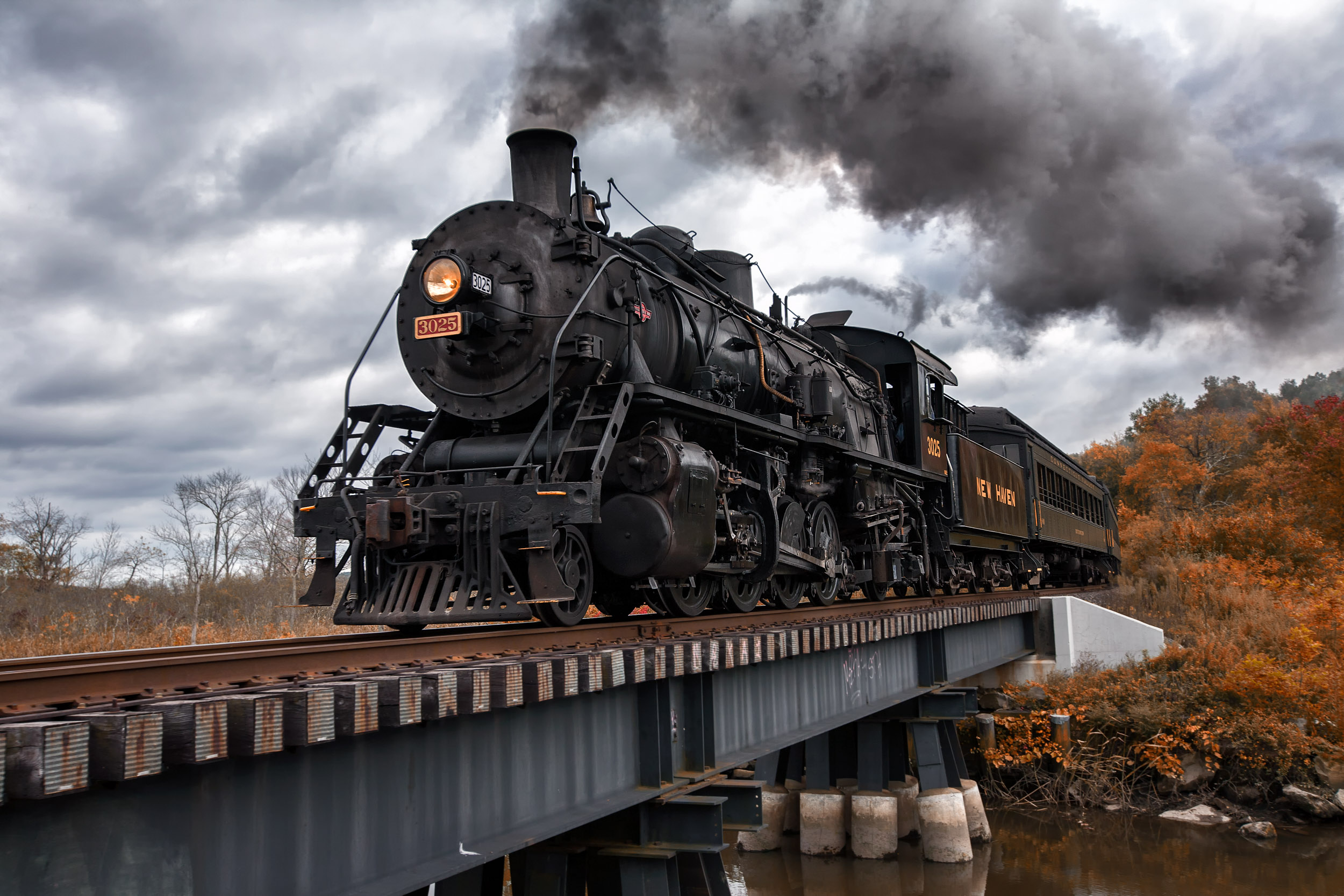
No. 3025 hauling an excursion over a bridge on the VALE, November 6, 2015

In 2006, the Connecticut Valley Railroad, who had sold off their No. 1647 locomotive back in December 1991, began searching for another steam locomotive to acquire and supplement their existing roster, since 2-8-0 No. 97 was scheduled to be removed from service for a major overhaul in 2010, while 2-8-2 No. 40's ongoing overhaul was nearly completed. In 2007, the VALE's chief mechanical officer, J. David Conrad, entered negotiations with the KKRR to purchase No. 58, since it was still in good condition, but no deals were originally made. In October 2008, when the KKRR auctioned off their equipment, David Conrad attended the auction, along with VALE locomotive foremen Wayne Hebert and Kjell Benner, and they won the bid for No. 58.

The following month, VALE crews removed many parts from the SY, including all of the wheels, the cab, the smokestack, and the air compressor, and then the locomotive was chained to a beam trailer and shipped via truck. Upon arrival at the VALE's location in Essex, Connecticut, the wheel-less No. 58 was unloaded and placed outside the VALE's shop building, where crews steam cleaned off any grease, oil and dirt it still contained, and then it was moved into the building. The locomotive's wheels were separately shipped to a machine shop to be turned down and reprofiled, and then they were also shipped to Essex.

No. 58 was further disassembled to undergo multiple required repairs to its boiler and frame. Since the VALE had already planned to repaint No. 58 and to replace its cab, they decided to cosmetically alter it to resemble a New York, New Haven and Hartford Railroad (New Haven) J-1 class, and since the final original J-1 was numbered 3024, they opted to renumber the locomotive as No. 3025. (Note: An SY-3025 locomotive is preserved at Nanhu Park in China, having been built by the Changchun factory, in 1998, as SY-3023.) A new cab was fabricated with ALCO specifications and New Haven-designed windows. The tender tank was rebuilt with its handrails removed, and its sloped-back sides were extended upward to form a cuboid design. The locomotive was also cosmetically decorated with some original New Haven parts, including a former whistle, a former bell, and two former headlights, and a new numberplate was fabricated.

The purchase, shipping, and rebuild of the SY cost the VALE $540,000. On November 14, 2011, No. 3025's restoration was completed, and it underwent some successful test runs over the VALE's trackage throughout the month, one of which occurred on November 17, and a second one on November 22, when it was turned around on Amtrak's wye at the VALE's Old Saybrook interchange. On November 25, No. 3025 hauled its inaugural train for the VALE, which was the second section of that day's North Pole Express excursion from Essex to Chester, and return. It subsequently began hauling additional tourist trains on the line alongside No. 40. In May 2012, No. 3025 hauled some empty freight and passenger trains for a photo charter, hosted by Lerro Productions.

In late December 2025, No. 3025 was taken out of service to undergo its Federal Railroad Administration (FRA) 1,472-day inspection and overhaul. The locomotive will also be converted from running on coal to oil.

== See also ==
- Canadian National 3254
- Canadian Pacific 1278
- St. Louis–San Francisco 1352
- U.S. Sugar 148

== Sources ==
- Springirth, Kenneth C. (2010). Northwestern Pennsylvania Railroads. United States: Arcadia Publishing. p. 95. ISBN 978-0738573472.
- Gibbons, Robin (2016). Locomotives of China - The JF6 Family - The JF6, PL2, YJ and SY Classes. United Kingdom: Tynedale Publishing. ISBN 978-0-9934192-1-8.
- Miller, Max R. (2017). Along the Valley Line: The History of the Connecticut Valley Railroad. Wesleyan University Press. ISBN 978-0-8195-7737-5.
- Nanos, Tom (March 2012). "Mikado Reborn". Railfan & Railroad. Vol. 31, no. 3. Carstens Publications. pp. 28–33.
