= KD7 =

KD7 may refer to:

- China Railways KD7, a Chinese steam locomotive type
- Type KD7 submarine, an Imperial Japanese Navy submarine type
