= Valley Railroad 40 =

Preserved American 2-8-2 steam locomotive

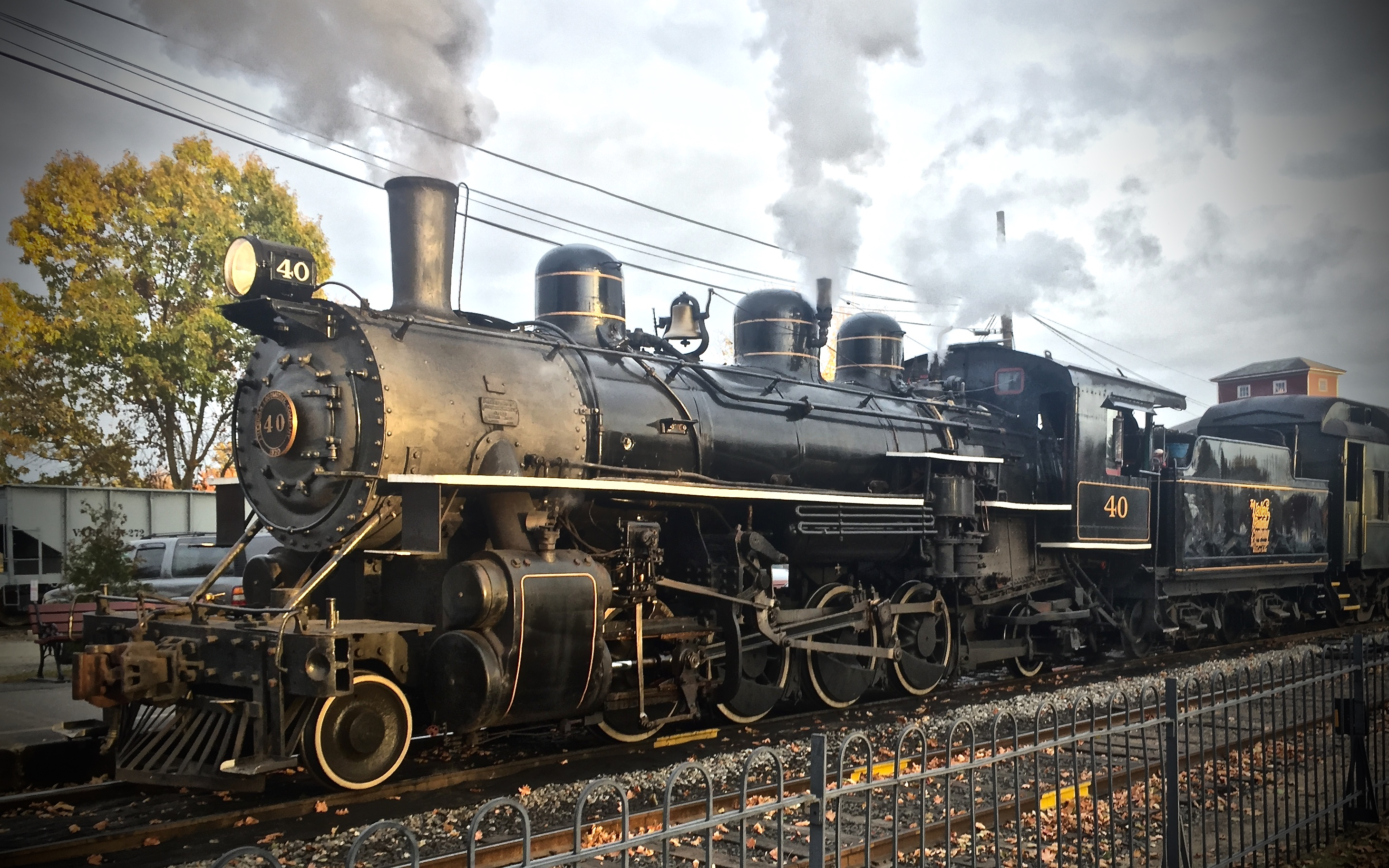
- No. 40 operating at the Valley Railroad in Essex, Connecticut, on November 5, 2015
Type and origin
- Power type: Steam
- Builder: American Locomotive Company (Brooks Works)
- Serial number: 61858
- Build date: August 1920
Specifications
- Configuration
  - Whyte: 2-8-2
  - UIC: 1'D1
- Gauge: 4 ft 8 1/2 in (1,435 mm)
- Driver dia.: 48 in (1,200 mm)
- Wheelbase
  - Drivers: 14.25 ft (4.34 m)
- Adhesive weight: 136,000 lb (62,000 kg)
- Loco weight: 176,000 lb (80,000 kg)
- Fuel type: New: Oil; Now: Coal
- Fuel capacity: New: 1,800 US gal (6,800 L; 1,500 imp gal); Now: 8 t (7.9 long tons; 8.8 short tons)
- Water cap.: 5,000 US gal (19,000 L; 4,200 imp gal)
- Firebox
  - Grate area: 43.30 sq ft (4.023 m^{2})
- Boiler pressure: 180 psi (1,200 kPa); 160 psi (1,100 kPa) (A&R)
- Cylinders: Two, outside
- Cylinder size: 20 in × 28 in (510 mm × 710 mm)
- Valve gear: Walschaerts
- Valve type: Piston valves
- Loco brake: Air
- Train brakes: Air
- Couplers: Knuckle
Performance figures
- Tractive effort: 35,700 lb (16,200 kg)
- Factor of adh.: 3.81
Career
- Operators: Minarets and Western Railway; Southern Pacific Railroad; Aberdeen and Rockfish Railroad; Valley Railroad
- Class: 101
- Numbers: M&W 101; SP 40; AR 40; VALE 40
- Delivered: 1923
- Retired: 1950
- Restored: June 17, 1978
- Current owner: Valley Railroad
- Disposition: Operational

Valley Railroad 40 is a preserved 101 class 2-8-2 "Mikado" type steam locomotive, built in August 1920 by American Locomotive Company's (ALCO) Brooks Works for the Minarets and Western Railway (M&W). It was initially built as No. 101 for the Portland, Astoria and Pacific Railroad as part of their small order of locomotives. However, the order was cancelled, and the locomotive was subsequently sold to the Minarets and Western Railway (M&W) to haul logging trains. No. 101 subsequently went through several ownerships during revenue service, until it was retired in 1950, and by that time, it was renumbered to No. 40. After spending several years in storage, No. 40 made its way to the Valley Railroad (VALE) in Essex in 1977. As of 2026, No. 40 is being used to haul tourist trains between Essex and Deep River, Connecticut, alongside 2-8-0 No. 97 and 2-8-2 No. 3025.

== History ==
=== Revenue service ===
In August 1920, No. 40 was one of four 2-8-2 "Mikado" type locomotives that were erected out of the American Locomotive Company's (ALCO) Brooks Locomotive Works in Dunkirk, New York, and it was originally numbered 101. These four locomotives were initially constructed for the new Portland, Astoria and Pacific Railroad to be used to pull logging and lumber trains in Oregon. However, the railroad was quickly shut down before the locomotives could be placed into service, and they were left in storage. In 1923, they were sold to the Minarets and Western Railway (M&W), a subsidiary of the Sugar Pine Lumber Company (SPLCO). The M&W put No. 101 into service by hauling lumber trains between the forest near Minarets and the railroad's sawmill at Pinedale. However, the SPLCO was struggling to pay their debts, and following the effects of the Great Depression, the company declared bankruptcy, in 1933.

In January 1935, as part of a foreclosure settlement, No. 101 was conveyed to the nearby Southern Pacific Railroad (SP). The SP however, couldn't make any usage out of light-weight 2-8-2s, and they quickly sold No. 101 to the Birmingham Rail and Locomotive dealership. In December, the locomotive was sold again to the Aberdeen and Rockfish Railroad (AR) in North Carolina, who renumbered it to No. 40 and converted it from oil to coal firing. The A&R reassigned No. 40 to haul freight and passenger trains on their trackage between Aberdeen and Fayetteville, and it subsequently became favored by crews who worked operated it. On one occasion, the locomotive was involved in a major derailment, but it was repaired and returned to service shortly afterward. During World War II, No. 40 was used as a supply of hot steam for trains that carried military soldiers out of the nearby Fort Bragg US army base.

In 1950, No. 40 was retired from revenue service, and it was stored inside a small shed for the next several years. It became the only steam locomotive from the A&R not to be scrapped, due to its popularity with crews, and the military trains out of Fort Bragg required some heating supply. During special occasions, No. 40 would be towed out of the shed to various A&R communities for display in local festivals. By the mid 1970s, the A&R began to consider donating No. 40 to the city of Aberdeen for permanent static display.

=== Excursion service ===
In 1976, the Valley Railroad, a tourist railroad that operated over former New Haven trackage, was looking for a steam locomotive to assist their Ex-Birmingham and Southeastern 2-8-0 No. 97 in their passenger operations. In 1977, after a VALE employee discovered No. 40 and its disposition, the VALE reached an agreement with the A&R to purchase the locomotive. It was pulled out of its shed and lifted onto two flatcars to be shipped to Essex, Connecticut. Upon arrival in Essex, No. 40 was test fired before it entered the VALE's locomotive shops for an overhaul that lasted for less than a year. No. 40 was placed into service for the VALE, on June 17, 1978, with then-Connecticut governor Ella Grasso christening the locomotive.

In 1985, No. 40 had to be removed from service, after one of its driving wheel tires broke. Necessary repairs on No. 40 began, the following year, and with No. 97 also being due for an overhaul, the VALE began searching for another steam locomotive for use in their operations. It resulted in the VALE investing in importing modified SY locomotive No. 1647 from China, and No. 40’s overhaul became a smaller priority. In 1990, when No. 1647 was placed into service, No. 40’s overhaul continued at a quicker pace, while No. 97 was relegated to stand-by service. In late December 1991, No. 1647 was sold off, and with No. 40’s overhaul nearly completed, the VALE prioritized it again, while No. 97 covered the railroad’s schedule. In December 1992, No. 40 was test fired, and on May 1, 1993, the locomotive returned to service, allowing No. 97 to undergo some required repairs. By the end of the 1990s, No. 40 was removed from service again, after the Federal Railroad Administration (FRA) enforced that any active steam locomotive in the United States go through a mandated 1,472-day overhaul. No. 40 was eventually back in service in July 2007. In December 2014, No. 40 was again removed from service to undergo another FRA inspection and overhaul, after a year of work, No. 40 returned to service on October 14, 2015.

== Appearances in media ==
- One shot of No. 40 is seen in a music video for Billy Joel's 1993 song River of Dreams.
- In 2011, No. 40 was filmed for a short scene in an episode of the HBO series Boardwalk Empire.
- In 2012, No. 40 was masqueraded as a Civil War-era locomotive for some background shots in the 2014 film Freedom, starring Cuba Gooding Jr. and William Sadler, and directed by Peter Cousens.
- No. 40 is seen in multiple scenes in the 2021 Hallmark Christmas film Next Stop, Christmas, which stars Lyndsy Fonseca, Chandler Massey, and Christopher Lloyd, and it was directed by Dustin Rikert.

== See also ==
- Valley Railroad 3025
- Tremont and Gulf 30
- Duluth and Northern Minnesota 14
- McCloud Railway 18

== Bibliography ==
- Miller, Max R. (2017). Along the Valley Line: The History of the Connecticut Valley Railroad. Wesleyan University Press. ISBN 978-0-8195-7737-5.
