= St. Louis–San Francisco 1352 =

Preserved American 2-8-2 locomotive

Type and origin
- Power type: Steam
- Builder: American Locomotive Company (Schenectady Works)
- Build date: April 1912
- Rebuild date: June 1944
Specifications
- Configuration
  - Whyte: New: 2-8-0; Now: 2-8-2
  - UIC: 1'D1'
- Gauge: 4 ft 8 1/2 in (1,435 mm)
- Driver dia.: 63 in (1,600 mm)
- Wheelbase: 74.16 ft (22.60 m)
  - Engine: 36.90 ft (11.25 m)
  - Drivers: 17 ft (5.2 m)
- Adhesive weight: 225,600 lb (102,300 kg)
- Loco weight: 322,600 lb (146,300 kg)
- Tender weight: 207,500 lb (94,100 kg)
- Total weight: 530,100 lb (240,400 kg)
- Fuel type: Coal
- Fuel capacity: 18 t (18 long tons; 20 short tons)
- Water cap.: 10,700 US gal (41,000 L; 8,900 imp gal)
- Firebox
  - Grate area: 50.30 sq ft (4.673 m^{2})
- Boiler pressure: 195 psi (1,340 kPa)
- Heating surface
  - Firebox: 350 sq ft (33 m^{2})
- Cylinders: Two, outside
- Cylinder size: (2) 26 in × 30 in (660 mm × 760 mm)
- Valve gear: Walschaerts
- Valve type: Piston valves
- Loco brake: Air
- Train brakes: Air
- Couplers: Knuckle
Performance figures
- Tractive effort: 53,356 lb (24,202 kg) w/ booster: 63,355 lb (28,737 kg)
- Factor of adh.: 4.23
Career
- Operators: St. Louis-San Francisco Railway
- Class: 1306; 1350
- Numbers: StLSF 1321; StLSF 1352
- Retired: 1956
- Current owner: Valley Railroad
- Disposition: Stored, awaiting shipment

St. Louis–San Francisco 1352 is a 2-8-2 "Mikado" type steam locomotive, it was built in April 1912 as a 2-8-0 Consolidation-type by the American Locomotive Company's (ALCO) Schenectady Works in Schenectady, New York, for the St. Louis–San Francisco Railway (SLSF or "Frisco"), the engine was later rebuilt into a 2-8-2 Mikado-type to keep up with the traffic demands from World War II. After being retired from the Frisco, the locomotive was moved to many locations under several owners, until it ended up in a small engine house in Rural, Illinois. The locomotive was disassembled by a group with the intent to restore it to operation. Later, the American Steam Railroad (ASR) was founded, and they purchased the No. 1352 locomotive in 2008 with the hopes of restoring it to operating condition. However, it was left partially disassembled in Taylorville, Illinois, due to the ASR being busy working on restoring another steam locomotive Reading 2100. In November 2023, the No. 1352 locomotive was purchased by the Valley Railroad (VALE) located in Essex, Connecticut.

== History ==
The locomotive was built in April 1912 as engine No. 1321, a 2-8-0 "Consolidation" type, by the American Locomotive Company (ALCO) at the former Schenectady Locomotive Works in Schenectady, New York. Due to the demands of World War II the Frisco railroad needed more heavy power to keep up with the demands in traffic. The War Production Board at that time would not allow new locomotive designs, but would allow existing locomotive designs to be built or existing locomotives to be rebuilt, so the Frisco took the task of rebuilding 6 of their existing 2-8-0s into 2-8-2 "Mikados". In June 1944, No. 1321 was rebuilt into a 2-8-2 and renumbered to No. 1352. The locomotive went through a major overhaul/modernization including adding of Nicholson Thermic Syphons, Superheaters and a Coffin feedwater heater system, the locomotive continued in regular service until it was retired in 1956, and it was subsequently donated to Swope Park in Kansas City, Missouri, for static display.

In 2008, No. 1352 was purchased by the American Steam Railroad (ASR) with the hopes of restoring it to operating condition. However, it was left partially disassembled in Taylorville, Illinois, due to the ASR being busy working on restoring another steam locomotive, Reading 2100.

In November 2023, it was announced that the Valley Railroad (VALE), located in Essex, Connecticut, purchased the No. 1352 locomotive from the American Steam Railroad, where it will eventually be shipped east to Essex, Connecticut for operational restoration work.
