= Deep River Freight Station =

- U.S. National Register of Historic Places
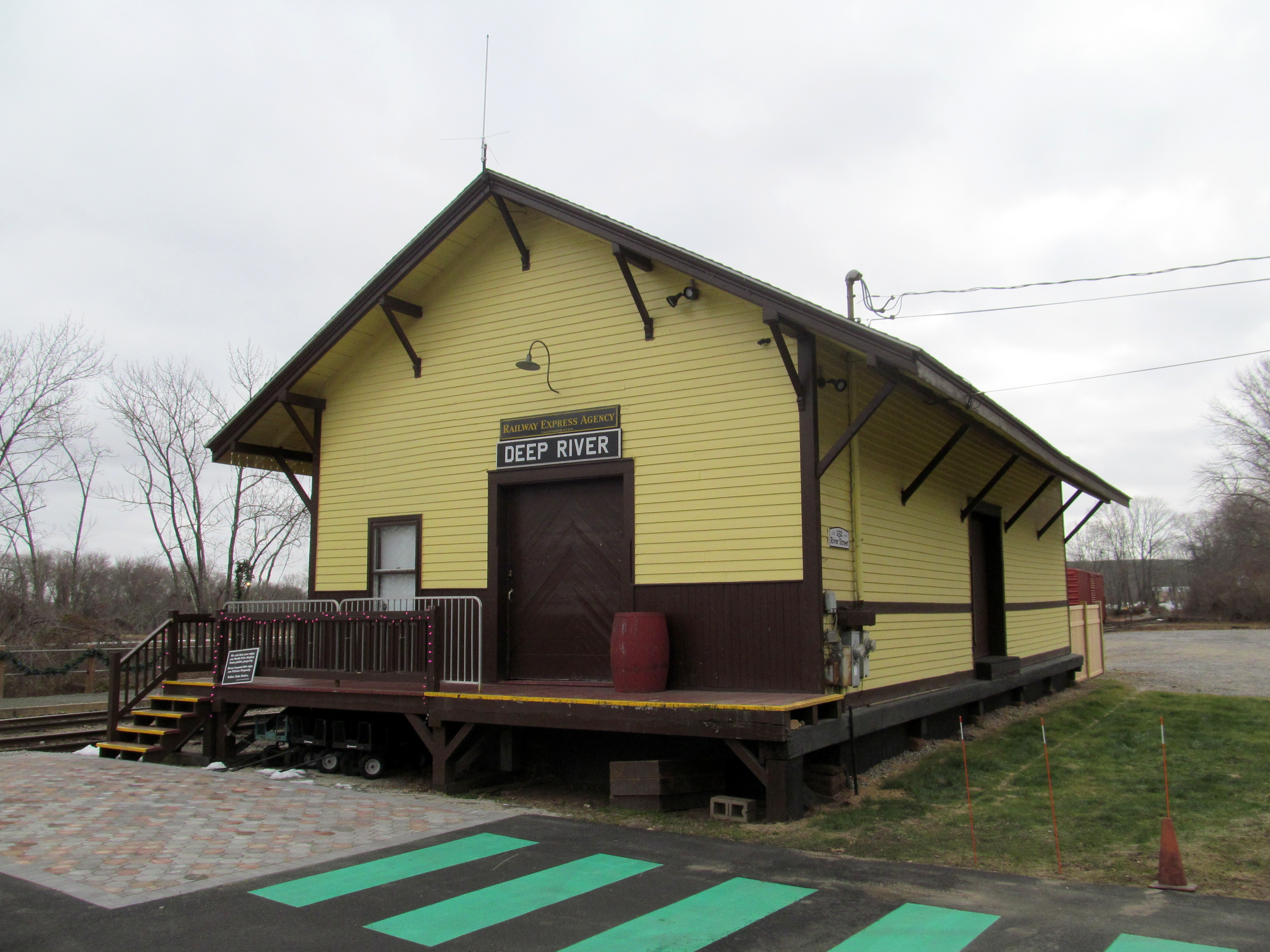
- Deep River Freight Station in December 2016
- Interactive map of Deep River Freight Station
- Location: 152 River Street, Deep River, Connecticut
- Coordinates: 41°23′38″N 72°25′37″W
- Area: 2 acres (0.81 ha)
- Built: 1915
- NRHP reference No.: 94001445
- Added to NRHP: December 21, 1994

The Deep River Freight Station is a historic railroad depot at 152 River Street in Deep River, Connecticut. Built in 1915 by the New York, New Haven and Hartford Railroad (NYNH&H), it is one of two surviving early 20th century stations on the southern end of the former Connecticut Valley Railroad (CVR) line. The building was listed on the National Register of Historic Places on December 21, 1994. It is now a station on the Valley Railroad, a heritage steam railroad.

== Description and history ==
The Deep River Freight Station is located in eastern Deep River, between River Street and the former CVR railroad tracks, which run parallel to the Connecticut River. It is a single-story wood frame structure, about 25 by 40 feet (7.6 m × 12.2 m). It is mounted on brownstone piers, which support massive wooden sills. Original period loading docks are on the buildings north and south side, and the building has a low-pitch roof with wide eaves supported by large brackets.

The station was built about 1915 by the NYNH&H, as part of a government-mandated program to update railroad infrastructure. The station was originally built to serve both passengers and freight. Passenger service on the line was decimated by competition from the automobile, and ended in 1933. Freight service continued until 1961, when the NYNH&H went bankrupt. A portion of the CVR track was revived as a heritage railroad in 1971.

== See also ==
- National Register of Historic Places listings in Middlesex County, Connecticut
