= Connecticut Valley Railroad Roundhouse and Turntable Site =

- U.S. National Register of Historic Places
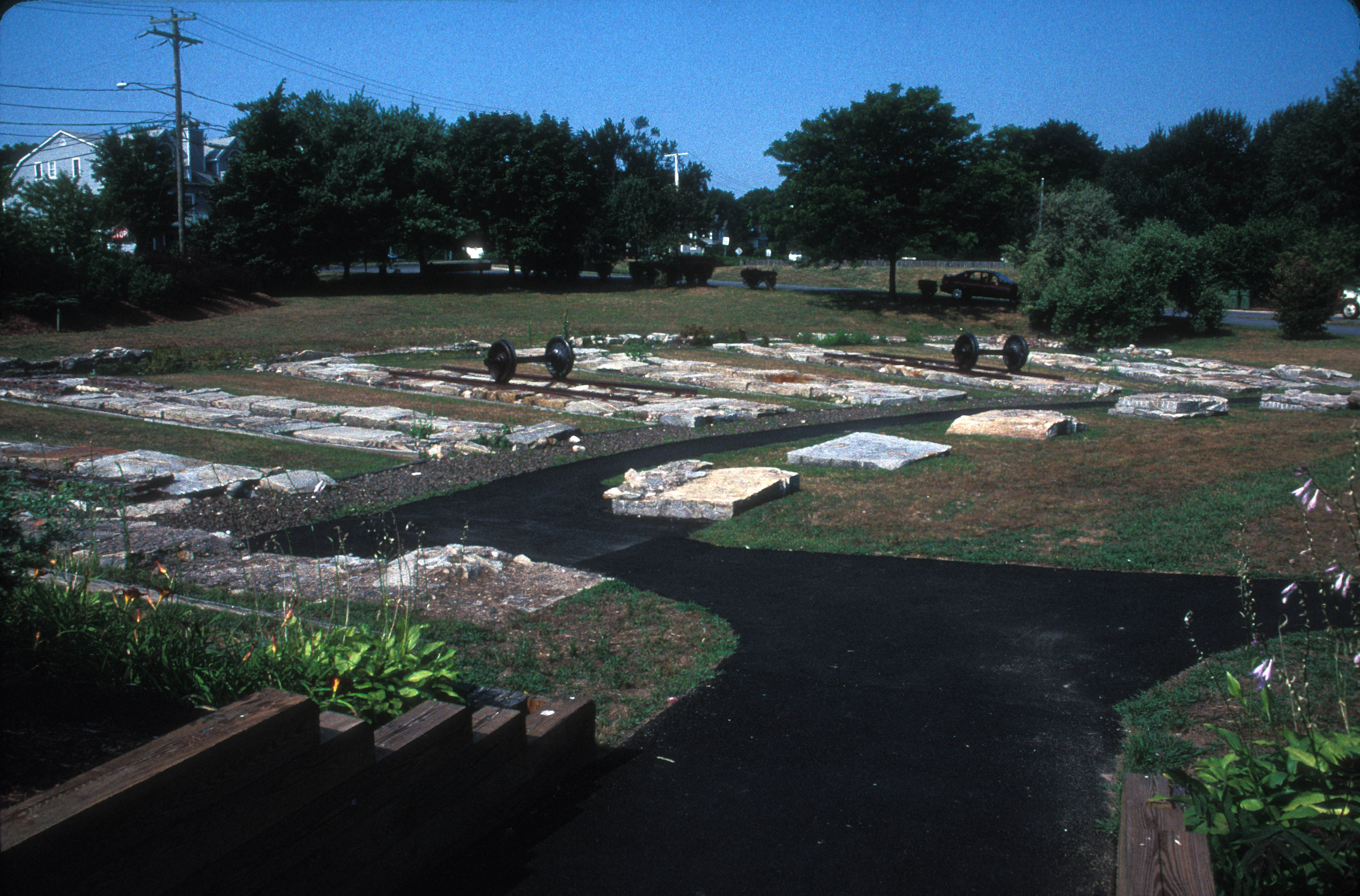

- Location within Connecticut Location within the United States
- Location: Off Main Street in Fort Saybrook Monument Park in Saybrook Point, Old Saybrook, Connecticut
- Coordinates: 41°17′4″N 72°21′4″W
- Area: less than one acre
- Built: 1871
- NRHP reference No.: 94000395
- Added to NRHP: April 28, 1994

The Connecticut Valley Railroad Roundhouse and Turntable Site is a former railroad facility located in Fort Saybrook Monument Park off Main Street in Old Saybrook, Connecticut. The roundhouse and turntable were built in 1871 by the Connecticut Valley Railroad, which was later acquired by the New York, New Haven and Hartford Railroad. The rail facilities are built partly on the archaeological remains of Fort Saybrook, the main fortification of the 17th-century Saybrook Colony, and are the only surviving remnant of what was once a large facility, with an icehouse, coal bin, steamboat dock, depot, and signal tower. Archaeological remains of these other facilities are believed to lie under other parts of the park and adjacent properties. The exposed facilities were excavated in 1981-2. Both structures were added to the National Register of Historic Places on April 28, 1994.

The Connecticut Valley Railroad was chartered in 1868, and began operations three years later, providing service between Saybrook Point and Hartford, with a connection to the Shore Line Railway at the Saybrook Junction station. The extension to Saybrook Point ceased operations in 1922, and its facilities were abandoned. The roundhouse was a quarter-round structure housing six bays, with foundations of brick and stone, supporting both the structure and the tracks on which the railroad cars ran. The turntable had a concrete base. Portions of these features are exposed in the park, with interpretive signage explaining the use and history of the site.

== See also ==
- National Register of Historic Places listings in Middlesex County, Connecticut
