= Connecticut Valley Railroad =

Defunct railroad in Connecticut

- Hartford and Connecticut Valley Railroad
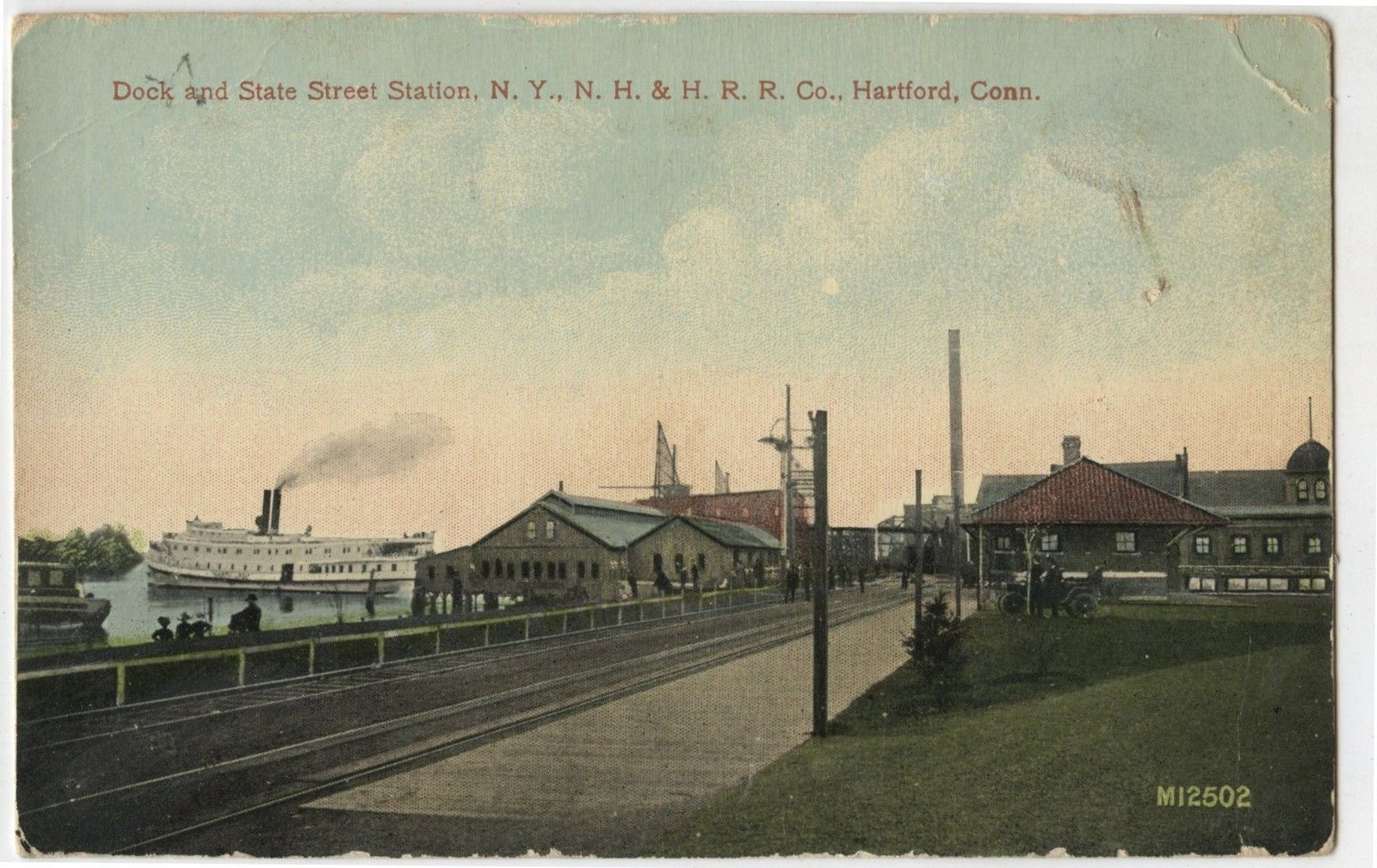
- The Connecticut Valley Railroad's State Street Station in Hartford

Overview
- Current operator: Valley Railroad
- Locale: Connecticut
- Dates of operation: 1871–1887
- Successor: New York, New Haven and Hartford Railroad

Technical
- Length: 47 miles (76 km)

The Connecticut Valley Railroad was a railroad in the state of Connecticut founded in 1868. The company built a line along the Connecticut River between Hartford and Old Saybrook, which opened in 1871. It was reorganized as the Hartford and Connecticut Valley Railroad in 1880, and leased by the New York, New Haven and Hartford Railroad in 1887. Following partial abandonments by the New Haven Railroad and successor Penn Central Transportation Company between 1968 and 1972, the line south of Middletown was revived as the Valley Railroad, a heritage railroad, while the portion in Middletown and northward saw operation by several freight railroads. As of 2022, the Providence and Worcester Railroad and Connecticut Southern Railroad both operate portions of the former Connecticut Valley Railroad.

== History ==
=== Founding ===
The Connecticut Valley, which follows the course of the Connecticut River, was an important transportation corridor for New England. The Hartford and New Haven Railroad, Connecticut's first railroad, built much of its route along the river valley between Hartford and Springfield, Massachusetts. Northwards, the Connecticut River Railroad followed the river's course to Vermont. By 1860, the only portion of the river without a railroad line following it was the southernmost portion, between Hartford and Old Saybrook, on Long Island Sound. This portion was heavily traveled by steamboats, but in 1868 the Connecticut Valley Railroad was founded by businessmen in Hartford, led by James Clark Walkley, to build along the river.

=== Construction ===
Following a survey, the railroad began construction along the river's western bank in 1869. As late as December 1869, the location of the railroad's southern terminus at Long Island Sound had not been decided – the towns of Clinton and Westbrook both wanted the Valley Railroad to locate its terminus within their borders, as did the city of Old Saybrook, at the mouth of the Connecticut River. The railroad ultimately decided on Old Saybrook, with the route approved by the Connecticut Railroad Commission on March 24, 1870. This left three miles of the route out of Hartford as the only portion of the route not decided upon.

Service between Hartford and Old Saybrook began in 1871; an extension southwards to Fenwick, Connecticut was built the following year, bringing the railroad's total length to 47 miles.

=== Operations ===
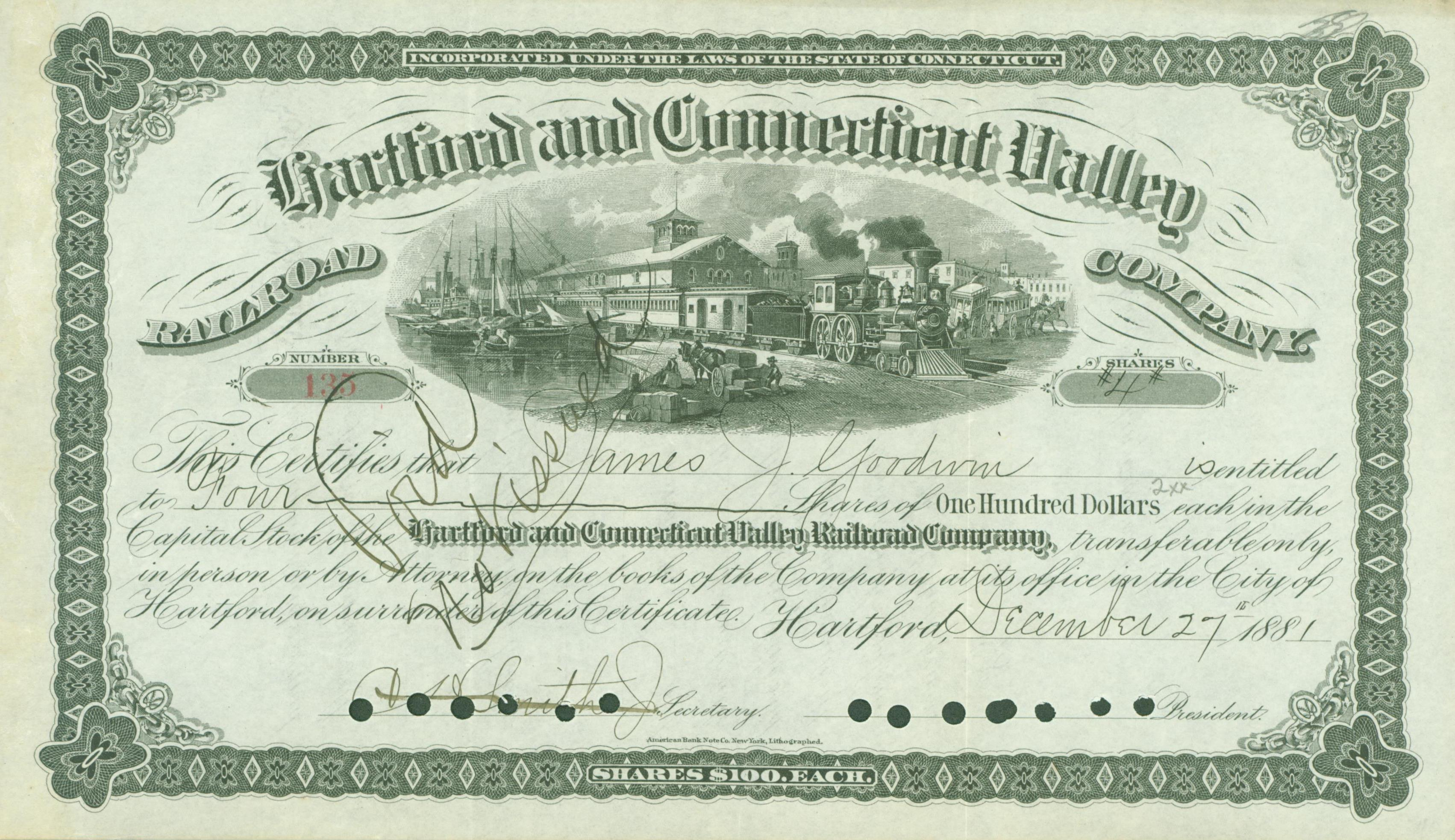
A Hartford and Connecticut Valley Railroad share certificate

Two years after beginning operations, the Connecticut Valley Railroad was badly affected by the Panic of 1873; by 1876, it had defaulted and the holders of its bonds became the new owners. The company was then reorganized, adopting the new name Hartford and Connecticut Valley Railroad starting in 1880. Judging that the railroad was not particularly valuable, its ownership decided the best course of action was to convince the competing New York, New Haven and Hartford Railroad (The New Haven) to buy the company. To put this plan into action, the Valley Railroad made some investments into its physical plant, while openly declaring its intentions to expand northwards beyond Hartford to Springfield, Massachusetts. This would allow a continuous route from the Boston and Albany Railroad main line in Massachusetts to the Connecticut coastline, directly competing with the New Haven's ex-Hartford and New Haven Railroad line. The scheme was a success – fiercely protective of its lines and fearing any competition, the New Haven spent a considerable amount of money to take control of the Valley Railroad in fall 1882, paying well above market value in doing so.

=== New Haven ===
Following its assumption of control in 1882, the New Haven Railroad leased the Valley Railroad outright in 1887, with it becoming the company's Valley Division. Several changes were made in Hartford around 1907 as part of yard reconfiguration and construction of the Bulkeley Bridge, including replacement of the State Street station building. As the railroad's route bypassed much of Connecticut's industrial areas, it was never an important part of the New Haven system. Following declines in connecting steamship traffic, the southern end of the line was gradually abandoned, cut back from Fenwick to Saybrook Point in 1917, and then again to Old Saybrook in 1922. In 1933, the New Haven ended all passenger service along the line.

What little industry remained on the line gradually declined, and by 1960 the New Haven served the entire line with a single freight train per week. In 1968, the southern portion of the line was abandoned, from Old Saybrook to a waypoint called Laurel, four miles south of Middletown. On January 1, 1969, Penn Central Transportation Company succeeded the New Haven; the company abandoned a further portion of the line between Rocky Hill and Cromwell in 1972, leaving two disconnected parts in service. On the remaining tracks between Hartford and Rocky Hill, and between Cromwell and Middletown, infrequent freight service was provided around once per week. Bankrupt since 1970, Penn Central was absorbed by government-formed Conrail in 1976. The infrequently used remnants of the Connecticut Valley Railroad were not initially planned to be included in Conrail by the United States Railway Association, but the state of Connecticut intervened to prevent the line from being entirely abandoned, directly leasing the segment between Wethersfield and Rock Hill and hiring Conrail to operate freight service. The remaining portions of the line were directly operated by Conrail; between Hartford and Rocky Hill one to two trains a week operated out of Hartford Yard to serve local customers, while sporadic train service was provided in and north of Middletown by a Conrail train based out of Cedar Hill Yard near New Haven, Connecticut.

In the 1980s, Conrail began to spin off its operations in central Connecticut, selling the northern part of the line to the Boston and Maine Railroad in 1982, which also took over the contract with the state of Connecticut. This was then followed in 1987 by the sale of all Conrail operations in and around Middletown to a new shortline railroad called the Connecticut Central Railroad.

=== The new Valley Railroad ===
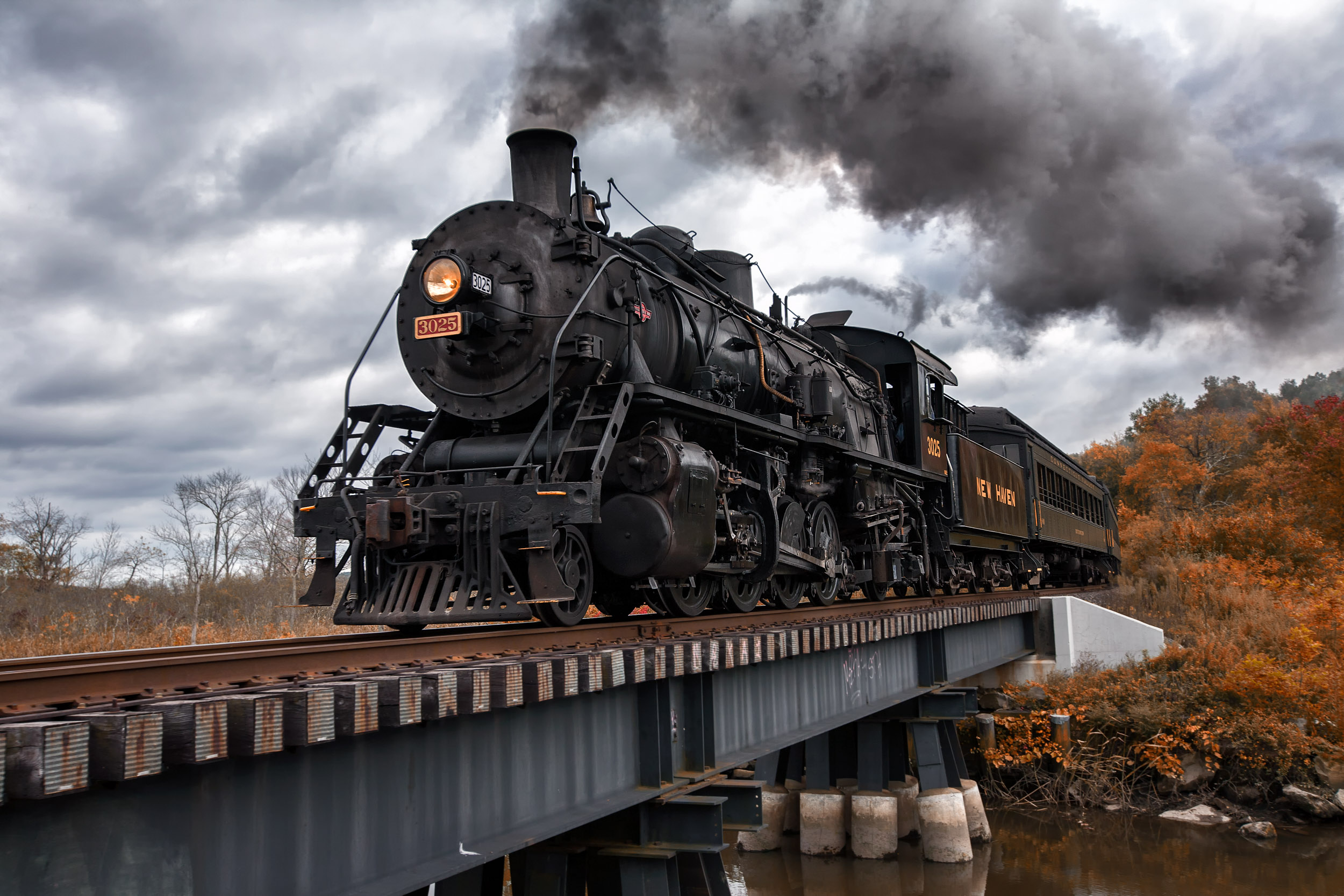
Valley Railroad 3025 operates on the revived Valley Railroad

The portion of the line abandoned by the New Haven Railroad in 1968 was saved by the Valley Railroad and the state of Connecticut. The state designated the entire abandoned line as a linear park, protecting it from being redeveloped. Meanwhile, the new Valley Railroad launched heritage train services in 1971 between Essex and Deep River, with an eye to eventually returning the entire line from Old Saybrook to Middletown to service.
