= James Clark Walkley =

American politician

Member of the Connecticut Legislature
- In office 1869

Personal details
- Born: March 3, 1817 Haddam, Connecticut, U.S.
- Died: October 4, 1890 (aged 73) Haddam, Connecticut, U.S.
- Children: 5 (1 deceased)
- Education: Yale College (BA)

James Clark Walkley (March 3, 1817 – October 4, 1890) was an American attorney and politician.

== Early life and education ==
Walkley, son of Deacon James and Lydia (Spencer) Walkley, was born in Haddam, Connecticut, on March 3, 1817. After graduating from Yale College in 1836, he taught in an academy on Long Island for two years, and then studied law for one year in Hartford with William W. Ellsworth, and for one year in the Harvard Law School.

== Career ==
After his legal education, Walkey settled in Hartford, Connecticut. He served as a clerk of the Connecticut Superior Court and Recorders Court. He was city attorney for two years and City Auditor for ten years. In March 1852, he became president of the Charter Oak Life Insurance Company and held that office until 1876. His residence was in part in Hartford and in part in his native town, which he represented in the Connecticut Legislature in 1869. He was prominent in the organization of the Connecticut Valley Railroad starting in 1869 and was president of the board of directors until his resignation in 1877. In 1871, he and his family were among the passengers when the first Connecticut Valley train traveled from Saybrook Point to Hartford.

== Personal life ==
He married Martha Ann, daughter of Captain Jonathan Smith, of Agawam, Massachusetts, and had one son, who died in infancy, and four daughters, who survived him. His last years were spent on his paternal homestead in Haddam, where he died on October 4, 1890, at the age of 74.
