= Valley Railroad 97 =

Steam locomotive

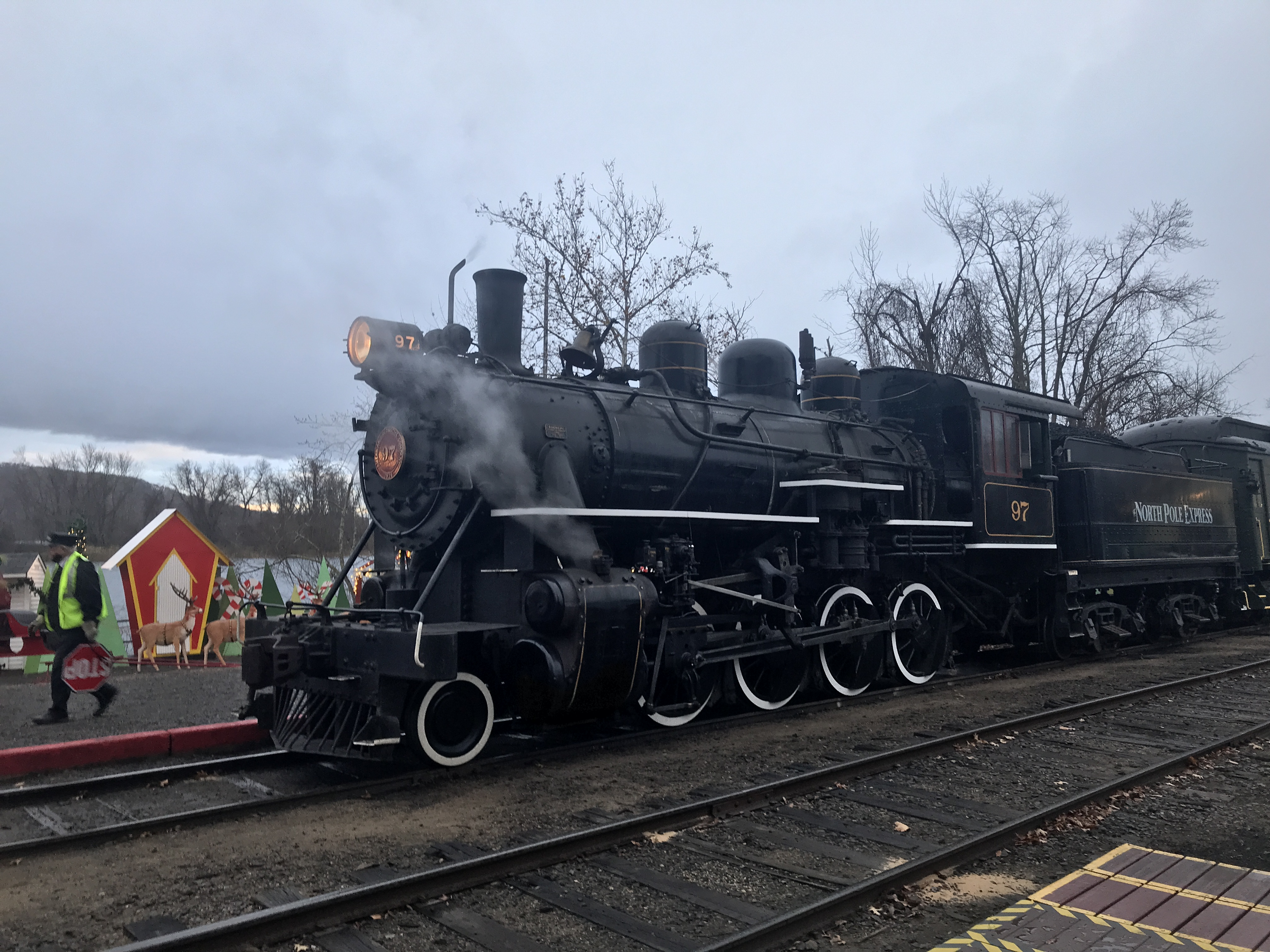
- No. 97 at Deep River on November 26, 2021
Type and origin
- Power type: Steam
- Builder: American Locomotive Company (Cooke Works)
- Serial number: 65188
- Build date: November 1923
Specifications
- Configuration
  - Whyte: 2-8-0
  - UIC: 1’D’
- Gauge: 4 ft 8 1/2 in (1,435 mm)
- Leading dia.: 28 in (710 mm)
- Driver dia.: 48 in (1,200 mm)
- Width: 10 ft (3 m)
- Axle load: 30,500 lb (13,800 kg)
- Adhesive weight: 122,000 lb (55,000 kg)
- Loco weight: 141,000 lb (64,000 kg)
- Tender weight: 132,000 lb (60,000 kg)
- Total weight: 273,000 lb (124,000 kg)
- Fuel type: Coal
- Fuel capacity: 20,000 US gal (76,000 L; 17,000 imp gal)
- Water cap.: 6,000 US gal (23,000 L; 5,000 imp gal)
- Boiler pressure: 180 psi (1,200 kPa)
- Cylinders: Two, outside
- Cylinder size: 19 mm × 26 mm (0.75 in × 1.02 in)
- Valve gear: Walschaerts
- Valve type: Piston valves
- Loco brake: Air
- Train brakes: Air
- Couplers: Knuckle
Performance figures
- Maximum speed: 55 mph (88.51 km/h)
- Tractive effort: 29,918 kgf (65,960 lbf; 293.40 kN)
- Factor of adh.: 4.08
Career
- Operators: Birmingham and Southeastern Railroad; Vermont Railway; New York, New Haven and Hartford Railroad; Valley Railroad
- Class: 200
- Numbers: B&S 200; VTR 97; NH 97; VALE 97
- Delivered: March 5, 1926
- Retired: 1958
- Restored: 1964
- Current owner: Valley Railroad
- Disposition: Operational

Valley Railroad 97 is a preserved 200 class 2-8-0 "Consolidation" type steam locomotive, built in November 1923 by the American Locomotive Company's (ALCO) Cooke Works for the Birmingham and Southeastern Railroad (B&S), it is now preserved and operated by the Valley Railroad (VALE).

== History ==
=== Revenue service ===
No. 97 was built by the American Locomotive Company's (ALCO) former Cooke Locomotive Works in November 1923 as No. 200. (Note: Although its builder's plate says February 1926, several printed sources confirmed it was officially built in November 1923.) It was one of two locomotives that were intended to be exported to Cuba for use on the National Railway Company of Cuba. No. 200 however, never made it to Cuba as the order was cancelled, it was kept in storage at the Cooke Works factory until its closure in 1926.

Instead, it was subsequently sold to the Birmingham and Southeastern Railroad (B&S) in February 1926 and was moved to the company's shortline in Alabama on March 5, 1926. The locomotive pulled multiple passenger and freight trains on Birmingham and Southeastern trackage until it was retired from revenue service in 1958 and put into storage.

=== Excursion service ===
In 1963, No. 200 was purchased by New York publisher Stephen D. Bogen and moved it to the Vermont Railway (VTR), it was restored and placed into service and renumbered to No. 97 to avoid conflict with the railroad's diesel locomotive No. 200. No. 97 pulled mainline excursion trains on portions of the New York, New Haven and Hartford Railroad (NH) until it merged with the Penn Central Railroad in 1968.

In 1970, No. 97 was moved to Essex, Connecticut to haul tourists trains for the Valley Railroad (VALE) and was placed into service in the spring of 1973. Shortly afterward, No. 97 would replace 2-6-2 locomotive No. 103 as the Valley Railroad's train consist expanded. In 1977, No. 97's original small tender was replaced with a larger tender that was previously used from a Central Vermont Consolidation steam locomotive No. 404. No. 97's original tender currently sits out of service in Essex.

In December 2010, No. 97 was removed from service to undergo its 1,472-day inspection and overhaul as required by the Federal Railroad Administration (FRA), it was soon back in service on October 26, 2018.

== Appearances in media ==
In June 2007, No. 97 was coupled to some passenger cars to be filmed at Essex station for the 2008 film Indiana Jones and the Kingdom of the Crystal Skull, starring Harrison Ford and directed by Steven Spielberg.

== See also ==
- Huntingdon and Broad Top 38
- Arcade and Attica 18
- Tennessee Valley Railroad 610
- Valley Railroad 40
- Valley Railroad 3025
