= China Railways KD7 =

Class of Chinese steam locomotives

KD7
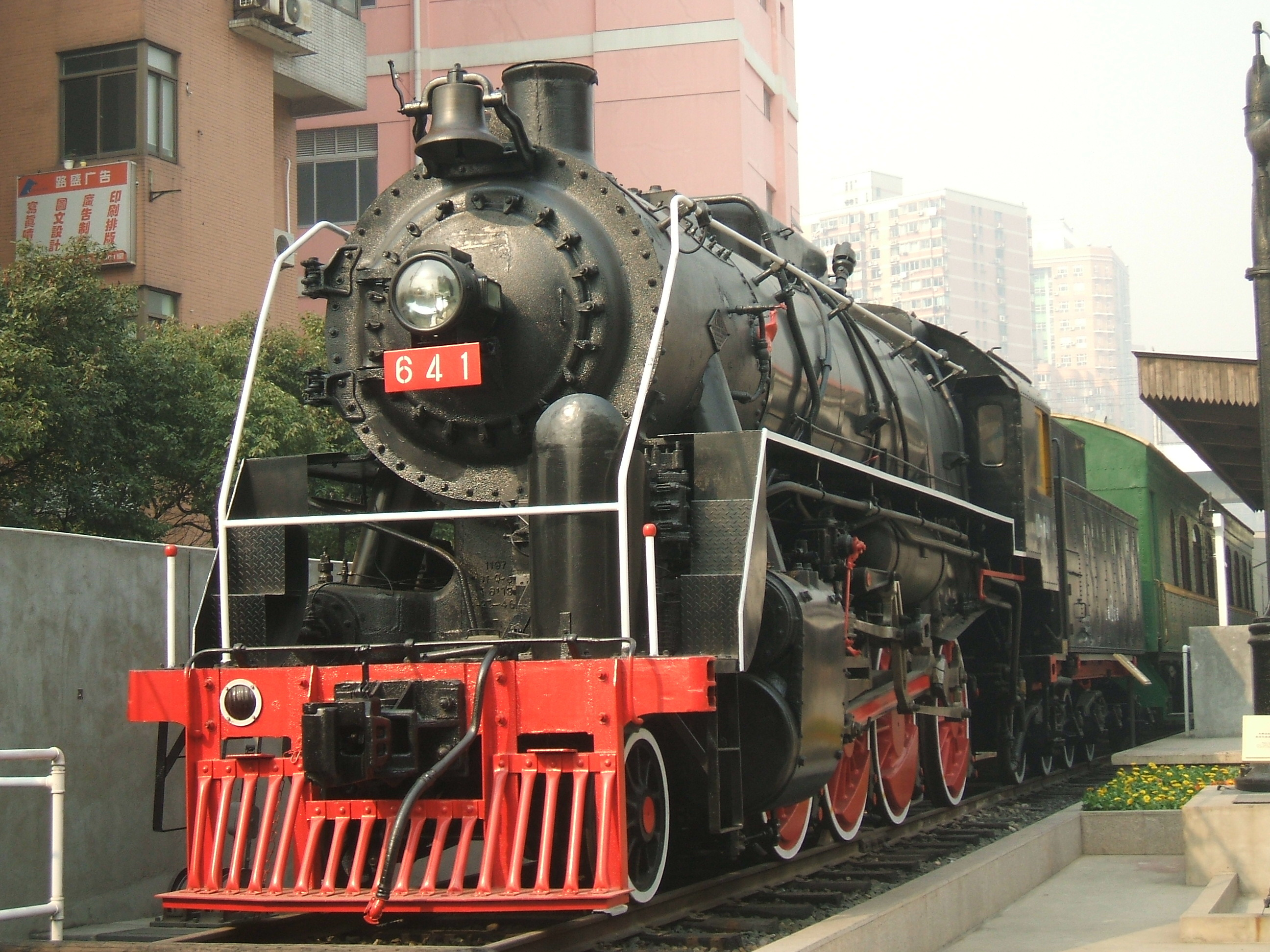
- KD7-641 preserved at the Shanghai Railway Museum
Type and origin
- Power type: Steam
- Builder: American Locomotive Company; Baldwin Locomotive Works; Lima Locomotive Works
- Serial number: ALCO: 74388–74422; Baldwin: 534, 73247–73326; Lima: 587, 9212–9256
- Build date: 1946–1947
- Total produced: 160 (1946)
Specifications
- Configuration
  - Whyte: 2-8-0
- Gauge: 1,435 mm (4 ft 8 1/2 in)
- Driver dia.: 1,520 mm (59.84 in)
- Length: 20.300 m (66 ft 7.2 in)
- Loco weight: 152 t (150 long tons; 168 short tons)
- Fuel type: Coal
- Tender cap.: 11.5 t (11.3 long tons; 12.7 short tons) (coal), 25 m^{3} (883 cu ft) (water)
- Cylinders: Two, outside
- Cylinder size: 560 mm × 710 mm (22.047 in × 27.953 in) bore x stroke
- Valve gear: Walschaerts
- Valve type: Piston valves
- Loco brake: Air
- Train brakes: Air
- Couplers: Knuckle
Performance figures
- Maximum speed: 90 km/h (56 mph)
- Power output: 1,203 hp (897 kW) (at wheels)
- Tractive effort: 170 kN (38,000 lb_{f})
Career
- Operators: China Railway
- Numbers: 501–660, 74388–74422, 73247–73326, 9212–9256
- Delivered: 1946–1947
- Last run: 1990
- Retired: 1970s–1990
- Preserved: 4
- Restored: 2002? (No. 511)
- Disposition: 4 preserved, remainder scrapped

The China Railways KD7 are a type of 2-8-0 "Consolidation" type steam locomotives. The KD7 locomotives were built in the United States and supplied to China by UNRRA as part of the post war rehabilitation effort in 1946. China received 160 locos while others of the same design went to Belgium as NMBS/SNCB Type 29.

In the late 1970s, China began retiring the KD7's and replacing them with JS classes, the last KD7 was used in mainline service in 1988.

At least four KD7s are thought to have been preserved. KD7 534 is at Beijing Railway Museum, KD7 587 is at Shanghai History Museum and KD7 641 is at Shanghai Railway Museum and KD7 513 at the Datong Locomotive Works Museum. A fifth loco, KD7 511, was reported to be under restoration in Hangzhou in 2002.

In 1989, the Arizona-based Grand Canyon Railway (GCR) was looking into acquiring and importing some of the KD7 class 2-8-0s to haul their tourist excursion trains, but they quickly backed out of the deal, due to the Tiananmen Square massacre complicating the exporting process.

== See also ==
- China Railways KD6
- China Railways JF10
- NMBS/SNCB Type 29
