= Boone and Scenic Valley Railroad 8419 =

Class JS 2-8-2 steam locomotive

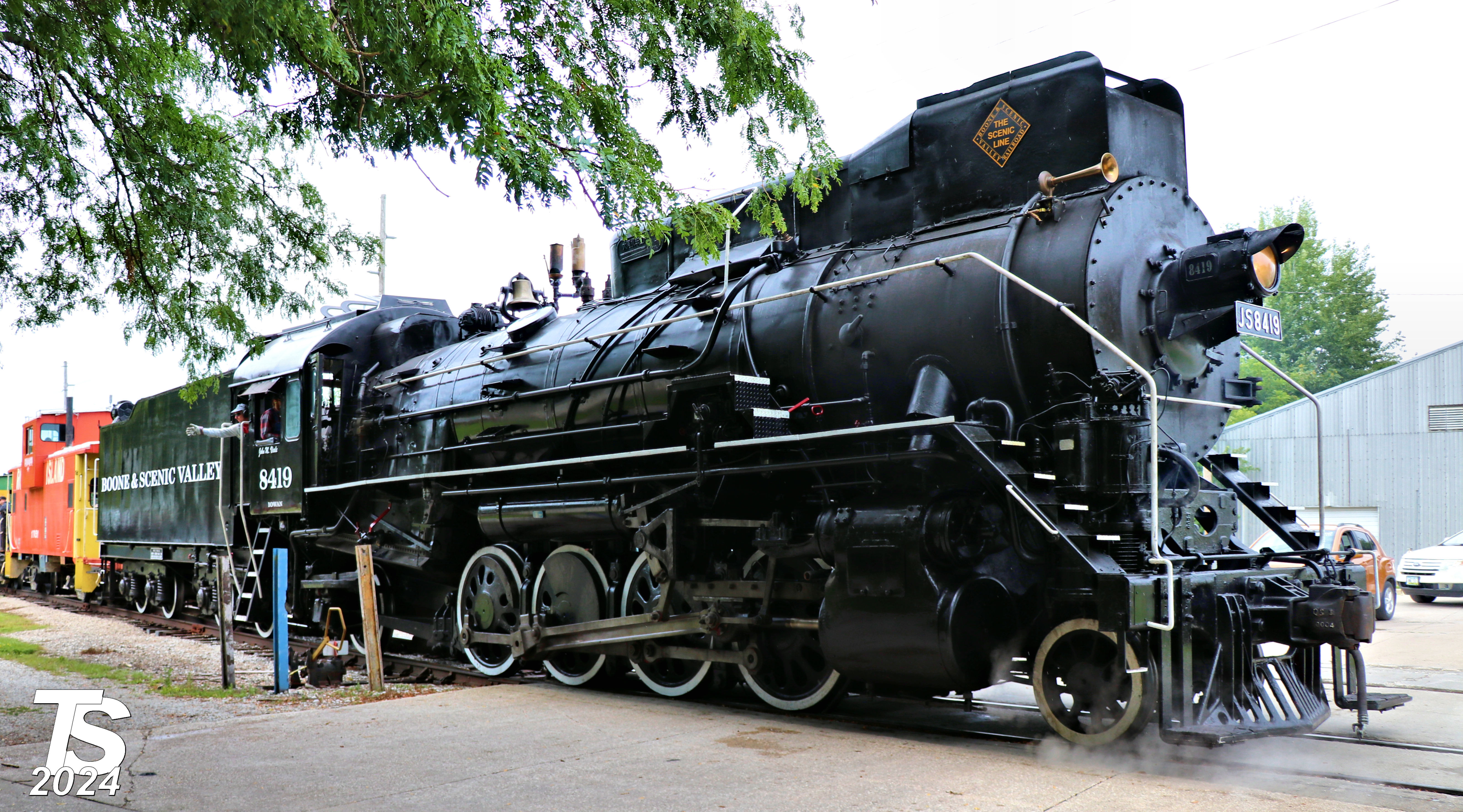
- No. 8419 sitting idle on the Boone and Scenic Valley Railroad, July 20, 2024
Type and origin
- Power type: Steam
- Builder: Datong Locomotive Works
- Serial number: JS-8419
- Model: JS
- Build date: October 1988
Specifications
- Configuration
  - Whyte: 2-8-2
- Gauge: 1,435 mm (4 ft 8 1/2 in)
- Leading dia.: 840 mm (33 in; 2.76 ft)
- Driver dia.: 1,370 mm (54 in; 4.49 ft)
- Trailing dia.: 1,120 mm (44 in; 3.67 ft)
- Tender wheels: 1,000 mm (39 in; 3.3 ft)
- Minimum curve: 145 m (476 ft)
- Length
  - Over couplers: 23,370 mm (920 in; 76.67 ft)
- Width: 3,150 mm (124 in; 10.33 ft)
- Height: 4,711 mm (185.5 in; 15.456 ft)
- Adhesive weight: 79.78 t (175,900 lb; 79,780 kg)
- Loco weight: 101.5 t (224,000 lb; 101,500 kg)
- Tender weight: 85.7 t (189,000 lb; 85,700 kg)
- Fuel type: Coal
- Fuel capacity: 16 t (35,000 lb; 16,000 kg)
- Water cap.: 35,000 L (9,200 US gal)
- Firebox
  - Grate area: 5.09 m^{2} (54.8 sq ft)
- Boiler
  - Diameter: 1,908 mm (75.1 in)
- Boiler pressure: 217.5 psi (1,500 kPa)
- Heating surface: 181 m^{2} (1,948.3 sq ft)
- Superheater
  - Heating area: 89 m^{2} (958.0 sq ft)
- Cylinders: Two, outside
- Cylinder size: 580 mm × 710 mm (22.835 in × 27.953 in); bore x stroke
- Valve gear: Walschaerts
- Valve type: Piston valves
- Valve travel: 161 mm (6.3 in)
- Loco brake: Air
- Train brakes: Air
- Couplers: Knuckle
Performance figures
- Maximum speed: 85 km/h (53 mph)
- Power output: 2,270 hp (1,690 kW)
- Tractive effort: 25,476 kgf (56,160 lbf; 249.83 kN)
Career
- Operators: Boone and Scenic Valley Railroad
- Class: JS
- Numbers: BSVY 8419
- Nicknames: Iowan
- Delivered: November 22, 1989
- First run: December 6, 1989 (test run); May 26, 1990 (Inaugural BSVY run)
- Current owner: Boone Railroad Historical Society
- Disposition: Operational

Boone and Scenic Valley Railroad 8419 is a China Railways JS class 2-8-2 "Mikado" type steam locomotive, built in 1988 by the Datong Locomotive Works. It was purchased by the Boone and Scenic Valley Railroad (BSVY) in 1989, and it was one of the first Chinese steam locomotives to be exported to the United States. Since 1990, it has been used for the BSVY's tourist excursion operations out of Boone, Iowa and over the Bass Point Creek High Bridge.

== Background ==
=== Design and abilities ===
No. 8419's affiliated class, the Chinese JS (abbreviation for Jiàn Shè (建设), Chinese for "Construction or Development") locomotive, was designed with a combination of aspects from the JF1 class 2-8-2s and the QJ class 2-10-2s. The design came with the chassis of a JF1, and some of the QJ aspects it came with included a Soviet-inspired welded boiler, a skyline casing that covered the chimney, and an identical eight-wheel tender. The JS also came with 54-inch (1,370 mm) diameter driving wheels and a boiler pressure of 217.5 psi (1,500 kPa), and it could produce a tractive effort of 56,160 pounds-force (25,476 kilograms-force).

The class was first developed in 1957 by the Dalian Locomotive Works, which proceeded to build 757 JS locomotives. Other manufactures contributed to production, including the Datong Locomotive Works, and by 1965, 1,135 JS locomotives were built. There was subsequently a hiatus of JS production until it was resumed by Datong in 1981. By then, Datong, along with the Tangshan Locomotive and Rolling Stock Works, were the only remaining Chinese manufacturers to mass-produce steam locomotives. In 1986, the JS design was revised to incorporate a greater tender capacity, a smaller diameter boiler (75.1 inches (1,908 mm), and single slide bar guides for the valve gear, and the design was overall made lighter than the previous JSs by 2.5 tonnes (5,500 lb).

In 1988, production on the JS class ended, bringing the class total to 1,916. The JS class was initially designed for mainline freight service, but in their later careers, they were reassigned to industrial services, switching services, commuter services, and secondary passenger service. The JS was notably the final class of Chinese steam locomotives to operate in commercial service, with JS-8089 last operating for the Sandaoling Coal Mine Railway, on January 15, 2024.

=== BSVY Railroad formation ===
In 1983, a group called the Save the Tracks fund acquired 11 miles (18 km) of the Chicago and North Western's (C&NW) former Fort Dodge, Des Moines and Southern line between Boone and Wolf, Iowa, and the line included the 156-foot (1,870 in)-high Bass Point Creek High Bridge. The Boone Railroad Historical Society was quickly formed, and within the ensuing months, the Boone and Scenic Valley Railroad (BSVY) was chartered and successfully began operating tourist trains between Boone and the disused Fraser Junction. The BSVY initially rostered some diesel switchers and electric interurban cars, and the historical society desired to also operate a steam locomotive.

Their first option was Norfolk and Western 475, which they received as a donation in 1985. They quickly decided against restoring No. 475, since it was found to require a rebuild more extensive and expensive than the BSVY's volunteer crews were capable of initiating at the time. Their second option was 2-8-0 No. 17, which they acquired from the Crab Orchard and Egyptian Railway (COER), where it had operated in commercial freight service, but No. 17 was also axed, since its mechanical condition was found to be poorer than No. 475's.

== History ==
=== Construction and export ===
In February 1988, Mel Hanson, a lumber yard operator and one of the BSVY's founders, was rewarded with a vacation to Bangkok, Thailand, upon winning a sales competition hosted by Georgia-Pacific. The following month, Hanson became aware of China's then-active steam operations via the March 1988 issue of National Geographic, in which Datong was detailed as the world's final commercial steam locomotive manufacturer, while Tangshan was overlooked.

Hanson quickly arranged for fellow BSVY founder George Eckstein to join the vacation, and after it began in May, they opted to make a side trip to visit the Datong factory, whose officials stated that they would cease steam production shortly. Upon returning to Boone, Hanson and Eckstein discussed with the BSVY's board of directors about possibly importing one of Datong's JS 2-8-2s, since Chinese locomotive specifications were identical to those on North American locomotives. While no formal decision was finalized, they began searching for financial backing. In December, Datong informed the BSVY that their steam production had ended, and that there were five JSs left available for purchase.

Fundraising quickly accelerated: the Iowa Department of Economic Development provided a grant-loan combination of $150,000; the BSVY borrowed $140,000 from a local bank; and many donations were given by visitors and supporters. On February 22, 1989, the BSVY purchased JS-8419, along with some spare parts, for $355,000, and that same day, the railroad announced that JS-8419 would be the first Chinese locomotive exported to the United States. (Note: Sources claim that JS-8419 was the very last steam locomotive to be built at Datong, but according to the book, Locomotives of China – The JF1 and JS Classes, by Robin Gibbons, there were a few other JSs built after it.) Coincidentally, the Valley Railroad (VALE) of Connecticut already had a deal in place with Tangshan to order a modified SY 2-8-2 (No. 1647), and the Knox and Kane Railroad (KKRR) would later follow suit with No. 1658. The two SYs required some re-engineering to abide by strict boiler codes while operating in the Northeastern U.S., but in Iowa, regulations were not as strict; stock-standard Chinese boilers were exempt for hobbyist and tourist usage.

Therefore, No. 8419 was allowed to retain most of its stock-standard aspects, such as the engineer's controls in the left side of the cab. The locomotive still underwent some modifications prior to shipping: a mechanical stoker was installed—making it the first JS to be fitted with such since JS-6240—water level tri-cocks were installed in the cab, and the asbestos inside the boiler jacketing was replaced with aluminum silicate insulation. Two slogans were painted on No. 8419's tender: one stated (Chinese: 騰雲越谷一聲啸; lit. 'Blowing cloud overpassing the deep valley'); and the other stated (Chinese: 碧海游龍雨逆情; lit. 'Dragon in the Blue Seas connecting the friendship between two countries'). All three Chinese 2-8-2s were to be shipped across the Pacific Ocean by mid-1989, but that year's Tiananmen Square massacre delayed the process of securing a ship.

Around that time, the Arizona-based Grand Canyon Railway (GCR) looked into joining the exporting spree by acquiring some American-built KD7 class 2-8-0s, but unwilling to wait the massacre out, the railway backed out of their deal. In September, one ship was secured, the M.V. Trade Fir, and the two SY locomotives were loaded aboard in Dalian, while No. 8419 was loaded in Qingdao, and then the eastbound voyage began. On November 2, the M.V. Trade Fir stopped at Long Beach, California, and No. 8419 was unloaded four days later. During the process, the dockworkers opted to use slings to hoist the locomotive instead of the lifting cradle that it was shipped with, but then one of the slings slipped, causing the rear of No. 8419 to drop 18 inches (460 mm) back into the ship, and the cab was tilted from being caught on the sling.

=== Excursion service ===
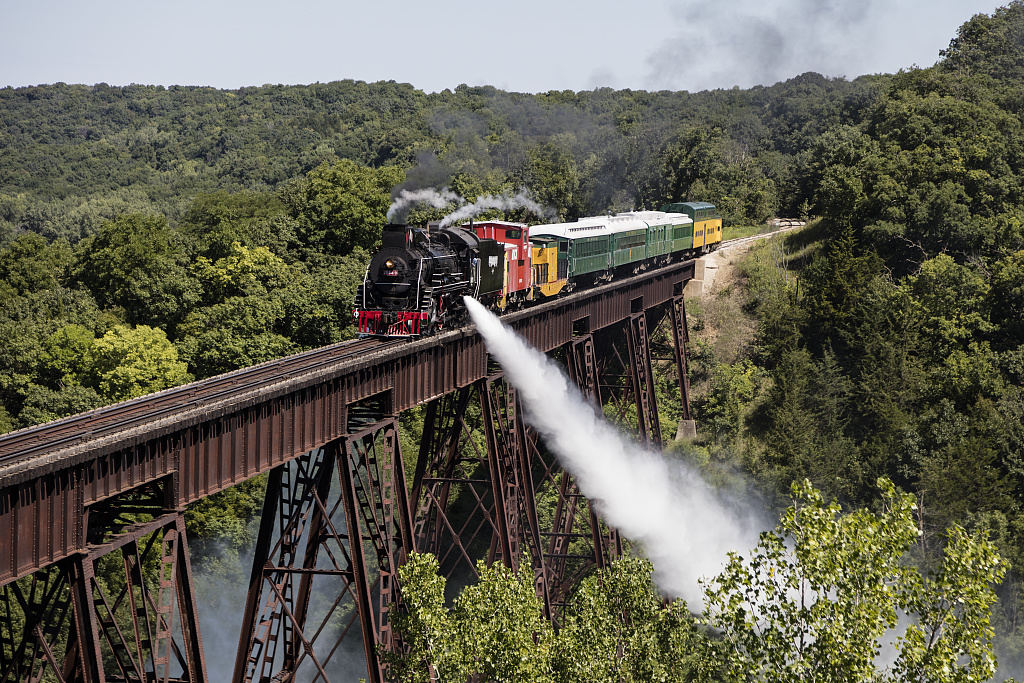
No. 8419 hauling an excursion train over Bass Point Creek High Bridge

No. 8419 was subsequently shipped via flatcar to Boone, and on November 22, it arrived at the BSVY. On December 2, some experts from the Datong factory arrived at Boone to help guide the repairs to the JS and to educate the railroad's personnel on how to operate it.

The locomotive was fired up for the first time on December 6 and made its first movements under its own power, following a subsequent engineering analysis, and with the boiler pressure reduced to 200 psi (1,400 kPa), No. 8419 became certified to operate by the Federal Railroad Administration (FRA) in early 1990. On May 26 of that year, No. 8419, proclaimed as the Iowan, hauled its inaugural BSVY train out of Boone and over the Bass Point Creek High Bridge. The JS then proceeded to haul weekend excursions for the railroad in the ensuing years, and its presence boosted ridership to around 45,000 passengers per year. The ticket sales also helped the BSVY resolve a $186,000 debt from their purchase loans.

In 1993, the BSVY's right-of-way was damaged from washouts and mudslides from that year's Great Flood, and No. 8419 was temporarily removed from service until the trackage was restored. In 2017, No. 8419 was taken out of service to undergo its FRA 1,472-day inspection and overhaul. It returned to service in October 2023.

== Bibliography ==
- Bailey, Douglas (May 1994). "Iowa's Scenic Line". Railfan & Railroad. Vol. 13, no. 5. Carstens Publications. pp. 54–59.
- Gibbons, Robin (2015). Locomotives of China – The JF1 and JS Classes: History and Allocation of the Chinese JF1 and JS Class Steam Locomotives. Tynedale Publishing. ISBN 978-0993419201.
