= Norfolk and Western 475 =

Preserved N&W class M 4-8-0 locomotive

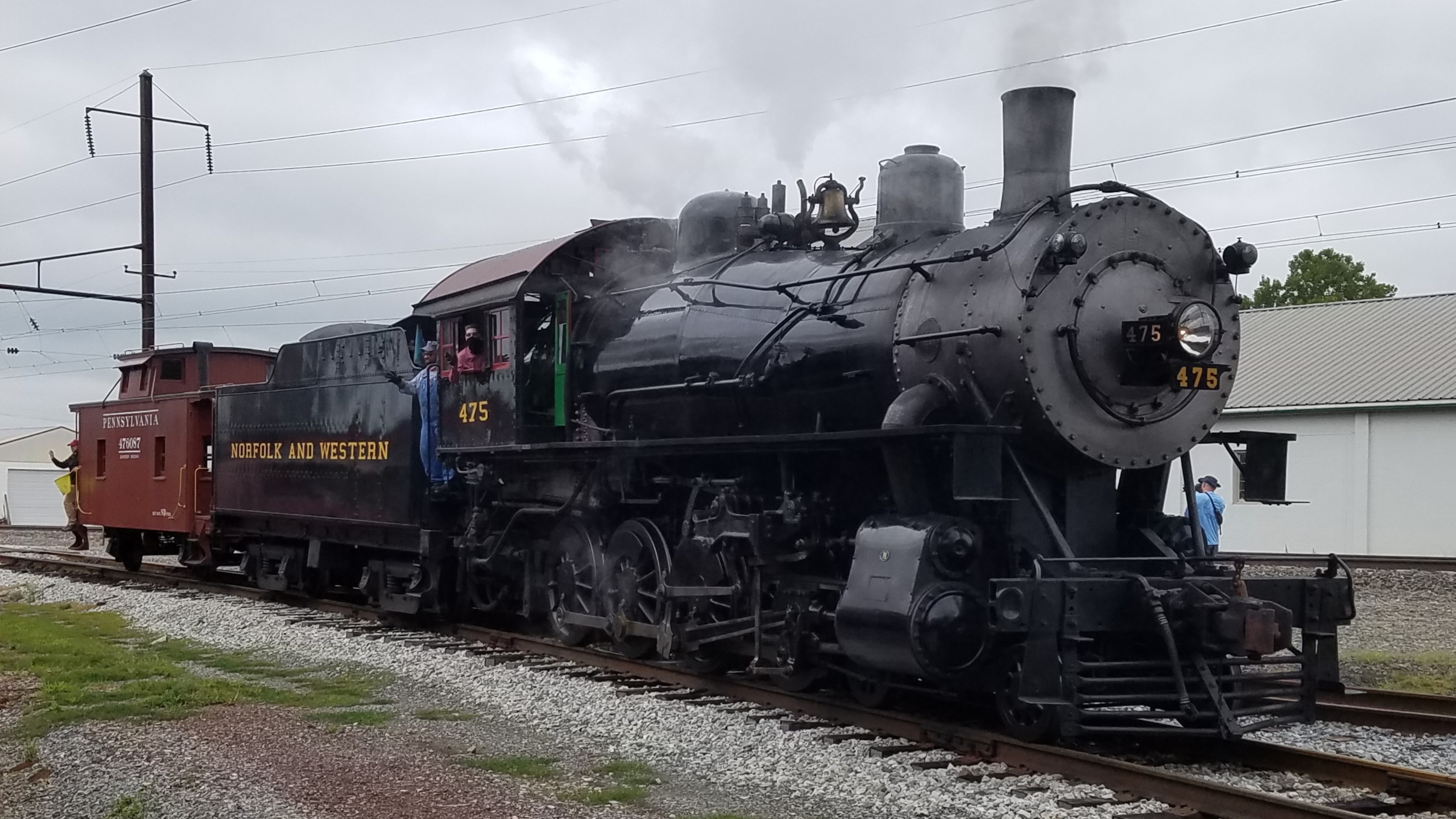
- No. 475 with a Pennsylvania Railroad caboose at Leaman Place Junction on August 16, 2020
Type and origin
- Power type: Steam
- Builder: Baldwin Locomotive Works
- Serial number: 28343
- Build date: June 1906
Specifications
- Configuration
  - Whyte: 4-8-0
  - UIC: 2′D
- Gauge: 4 ft 8 1/2 in (1,435 mm)
- Leading dia.: 27 in (0.686 m)
- Driver dia.: 56 in (1.422 m)
- Wheelbase: 58.37 ft (17.79 m)
  - Engine: 26.42 ft (8.05 m)
  - Drivers: 15.50 ft (4.72 m)
- Adhesive weight: 169,800 lb (77,000 kg)
- Loco weight: 206,200 lb (93,500 kg)
- Tender weight: 167,500 lb (76,000 kg)
- Total weight: 373,700 lb (169,500 kg)
- Tender type: USRA
- Fuel type: Coal
- Fuel capacity: First/Second tender: 10 tonnes (22,000 lb); Current tender: 20 tonnes (44,000 lb)
- Water cap.: First tender: 6,000 US gal (23,000 L; 5,000 imp gal); Second tender: 10,000 US gal (38,000 L; 8,300 imp gal); Current tender: 12,000 US gal (45,000 L; 10,000 imp gal)
- Firebox
  - Grate area: 45 sq ft (4.2 m^{2})
- Boiler pressure: 200 psi (1.38 MPa)
- Heating surface
  - Firebox: 173 sq ft (16.1 m^{2})
  - Total surface: 2,940 sq ft (273 m^{2})
- Cylinders: Two, outside
- Cylinder size: 21 in × 30 in (533 mm × 762 mm)
- Valve gear: Stephenson (inside); later Baker
- Valve type: Piston valves
- Loco brake: Air
- Train brakes: Air
- Couplers: Knuckle
Performance figures
- Tractive effort: 40,163 lbf (178.65 kN)
- Factor of adh.: 4.23
Career
- Operators: Norfolk and Western Railway; Strasburg Rail Road
- Class: M
- Number in class: 101
- Numbers: N&W 475; SRC 475
- Nicknames: Mollie
- Retired: 1959
- Restored: November 4, 1993
- Current owner: Strasburg Rail Road
- Disposition: Operational

Norfolk and Western 475 is a 4-8-0 "Twelve-wheeler" type steam locomotive, built in June 1906 by the Baldwin Locomotive Works (BLW) as part of the Norfolk and Western Railway's (N&W) first order of M Class, Nos. 375–499. It was first assigned to haul freight trains on the N&W mainline before being reassigned to branch line duties on the Blacksburg Branch in the 1920s.

Retired from N&W revenue service in 1959, No. 475 was sold to various different owners in Pennsylvania, Illinois, and Iowa until 1991 when it was purchased and restored by the Strasburg Rail Road (SRC) in Strasburg, Pennsylvania, where it currently runs tourist excursion trains in the Pennsylvania Dutch countryside. Since then, No. 475 became the only 4-8-0 locomotive operating in North America and the oldest operating steam locomotive on the SRC. It was also featured in the 2000 feature-length film Thomas and the Magic Railroad.

In 2010, 2017, and 2019, No. 475 was temporarily backdated to resemble its extinct sister locomotive No. 382 for Lerro Productions' Virginia Creeper photo charter runbys, paying homage to O. Winston Link's photography work. Also in that latter year, No. 475 was reunited with fellow ex-N&W steam locomotive J class 4-8-4 No. 611 for the first time since 1959. In late 2022, it was involved in a head-on collision with an excavator and was repaired with a new front smokebox plate and headlight. In early 2025, No. 475 was masquerading as No. 429 for the recreation of O. Winston Link's photography work again.

== History ==
=== Design change and cab configuration ===
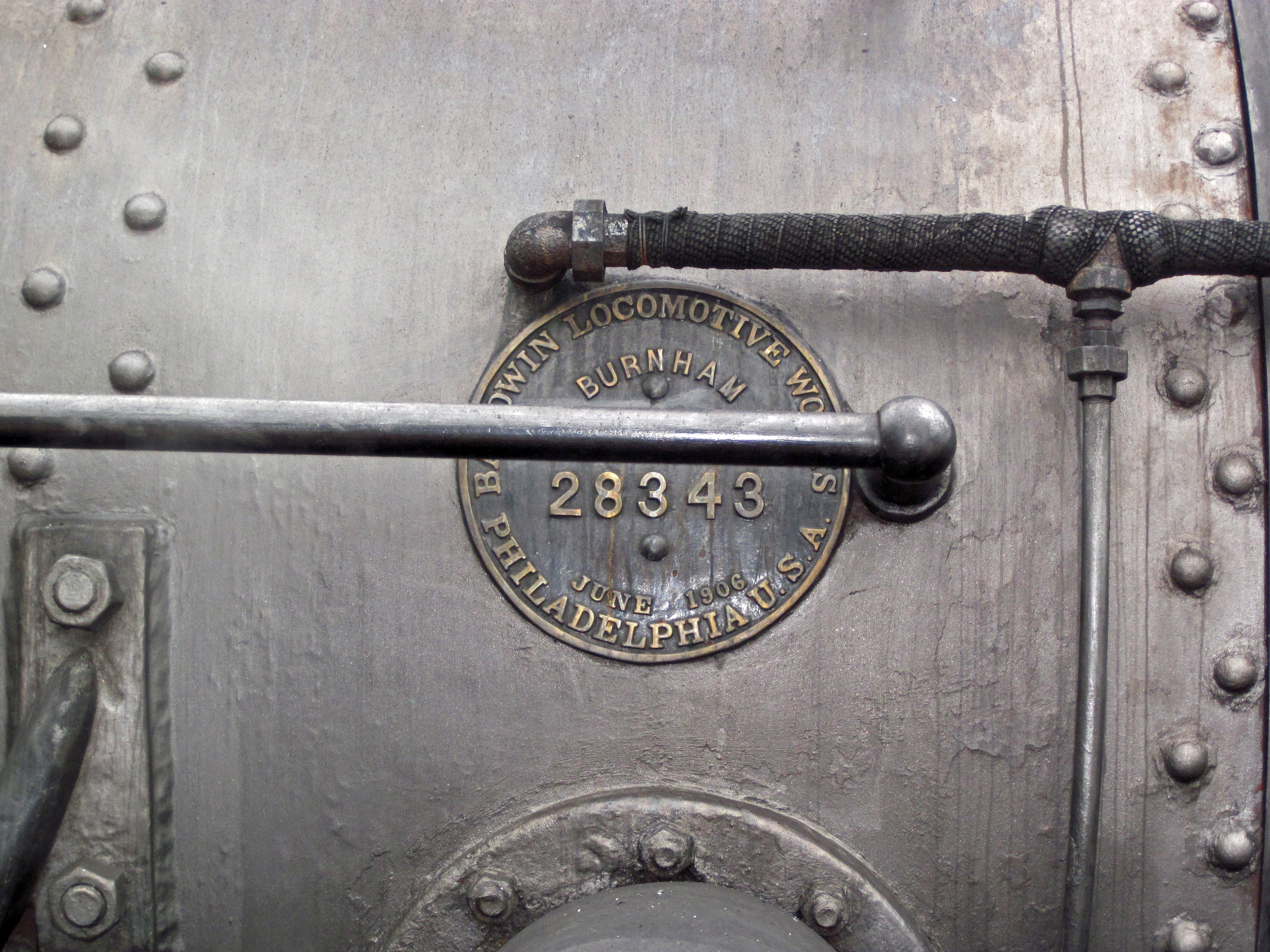
No. 475's builder's plate.

No. 475 is the 101st member of 125 M class 4-8-0 steam locomotives built for N&W in 1906–07, rolling out of the Baldwin Locomotive Works in June 1906 at a cost of $15,179.90. The M class was built to replace the 2-8-0 W class on pulling heavier freight trains. The classes were also given the nicknames Mollies by the engine crews. No. 475 was originally equipped with Stephenson valve gear and a 6-A type tender, which holds 10 tonnes (22,000 lb) of coal and 6,000 US gallons (23,000 L) of water. Sometime during the 1930s, No. 475 was re-equipped with Baker valve gear and a United States Railroad Administration (USRA) type tender, which holds 10 tonnes (22,000 lb) of coal and 10,000 US gallons (38,000 L) of water. No. 475 was one of the many M class locomotives that were not re-equipped with superheaters, excluding Nos. 382, 386, 429, 439, 447, 457, 459, 482, 493, and 495. In the 1940s, No. 475 was re-equipped with a longer tender that holds 20 tonnes (44,000 lb) of coal and 12,000 US gallons (45,000 L) of water. Additionally, it originally came from either a Y2 2-8-8-2 or a K1 4-8-2.

Inside the M class locomotives' cab, the engineer sits on the right beside the firebox, which is fitted farther away from the back of the cab, similar to the camelback design. Additionally, the firemen has to shovel coal on the tender deck instead of the cab deck. On the engineer's side, the throttle lever is mounted above the firebox and the reverser lever is in front of the engineer against the side of the firebox. On the fireman's side, the water glass, injector controls, and steam gauge are located on the other side of the firebox.

=== Revenue service and ownership changes ===
No. 475 worked on the N&W, hauling freight and coal trains on the mainline until the 1920s, when it was reassigned to pull short mixed freight trains on the 9-mile (14-kilometre) Blacksburg Branch between Christiansburg and Blacksburg, as bigger locomotives, including the Y class 2-8-8-2s and K class 4-8-2s, arrived on the N&W. In 1956, No. 475 was backdated to look like an 1880s locomotive with brass boiler bands, a fake diamond smokestack and oil headlamp to commemorate the centennial anniversary of the Virginia and Tennessee Railroad. This also includes the 75th anniversary of Roanoke, which was an event known as the Diamond Jubilee during August 1957. It was also paired with a USRA tender. A month later, No. 475 joined its sister locomotives Nos. 405 and 449 to haul a special National Railway Historical Society (NRHS) tripleheader excursion from Roanoke to Blacksburg. Afterwards, No. 475 only saw limited use until it was retired in 1959 and stored at the Shaffer's Crossing roundhouse alongside 4-8-4 class J No. 611, which recently retired after it pulled a Rail Museum Safari excursion.

In March 1961, No. 475 was sold to the Virginia Scrap Iron & Metal Company scrapyard. The following year, the locomotive was purchased by William Armagost from Hollsopple, Pennsylvania for $5,000 scrap value. Armagost made plans to restore No. 475 to operating condition for use in pulling tourist trains on a former Baltimore and Ohio (B&O) branch line, but for reasons unknown, those plans had fallen through. In May 1980, the No. 475 locomotive was sold to businessman H. Stuart Kuyper of Pella, Iowa, who desired to restore No. 475 and operate excursions with it between Pella and Des Moines, Iowa. The locomotive was moved to the Illinois Railway Museum (IRM) of Union, Illinois, for temporary storage, but Kuyper died while the move occurred, and then ownership of the locomotive was obtained by the Pella Historical Society. In 1982, No. 475 was sold again and became jointly owned by Kuyper's daughters, Carol Rosenberg, and Ann Lennartz, and then in 1985, it was donated to the Boone and Scenic Valley Railroad (BSVY) in Boone County, Iowa. The intention of the donation was for No. 475 to be used for the BSVY's tourist operations, but it was revealed to have required a major rebuild that they did not have enough funds or experienced volunteers for. The BSVY subsequently settled on importing China Railways JS 2-8-2 No. 8419, and No. 475 was deemed surplus and put up for sale.

=== Excursion service at the Strasburg Rail Road ===
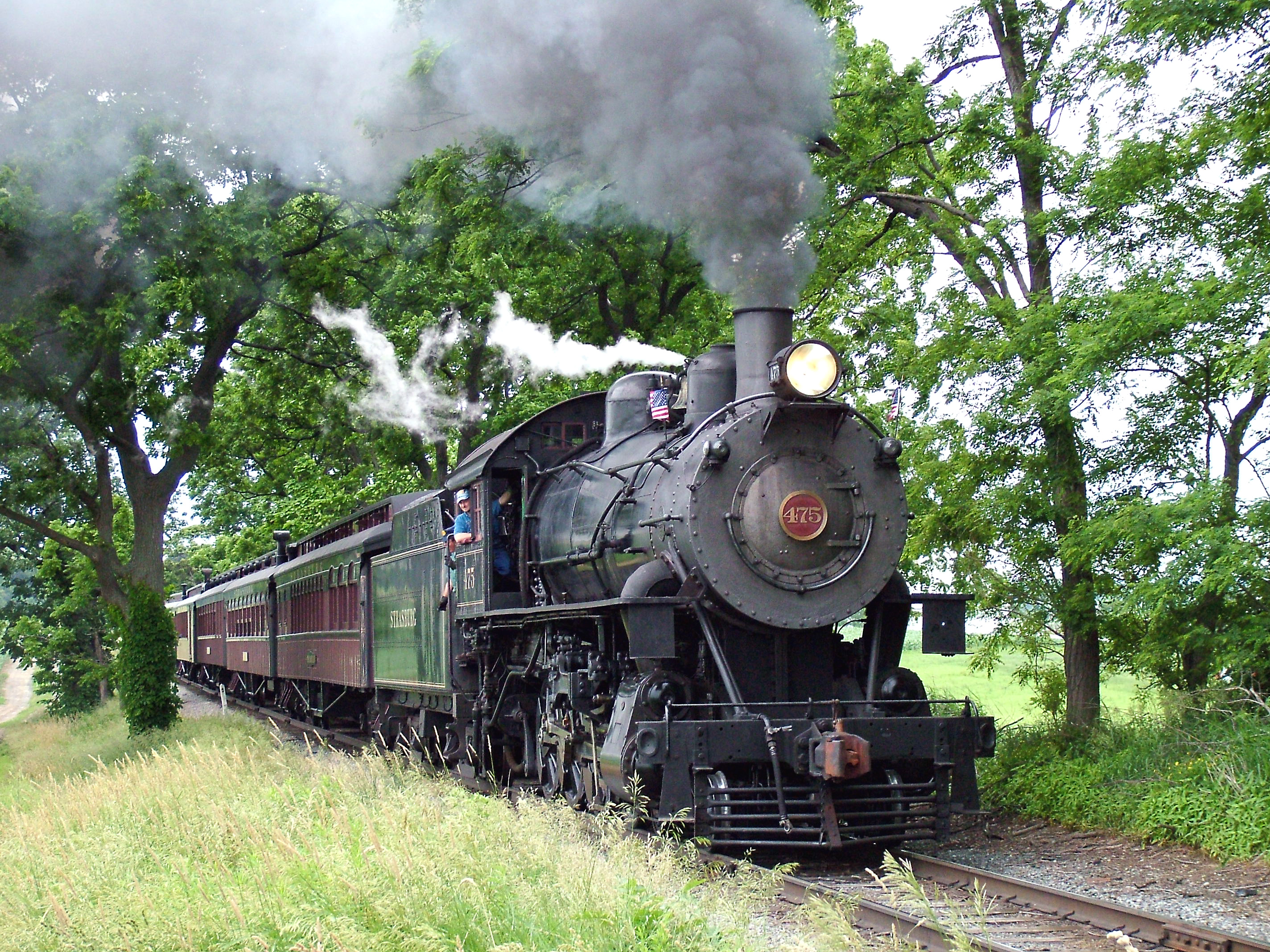
No. 475 hauling an excursion in 2004.

In early 1990, the Strasburg Rail Road (SRC) of Strasburg, Pennsylvania, searched to acquire a replacement for Pennsylvania Railroad (PRR) locomotives Nos. 1223 and 7002 in their steam tourist operations, and in doing so, they were informed of No. 475's availability. (Note: A number of steam locomotives were considered by SRC at this time, including Florida East Coast No. 148 and Lake Superior and Ishpeming No. 34.) Some of SRC's lead personnel travelled to Boone and inspected No. 475, as well as Crab Orchard and Egyptian (CO&E) No. 17, and while they found the former to be more feasibly restorable than the latter, the railroad was interested in obtaining both locomotives, but after some offers for both were rejected by BSVY, SRC decided to solely focus on No. 475. In January 1991, the BSVY accepted SRC's $100,000 offer to purchase the locomotive.

After arriving at SRC property on July 20, No. 475 underwent a thorough two-year restoration; many parts of the locomotive were reworked, with the tender tank being rebuilt, the smokebox being replaced with a newly-fabricated duplicate, and the running gear being reconditioned. No. 475 returned to operating condition on November 4, 1993, hauling a test extra, and it began operating in excursion service on November 6, pulling tourist trains in the Pennsylvania Dutch countryside between Strasburg and Paradise on the SRC. Since then, No. 475 was the only operating 4-8-0 in North America and the oldest operating steam locomotive on the SRC. However, the locomotive was the least favorite of the SRC crew due to its cramped cab.

In October 2004, No. 475 was backdated to its 1920s-30s appearance with an oil-headlight bracket, Pyle-National headlight and number wedge for Jim Gunning and John Craft's Rolling Mud Fence photo charter with CN No. 89 also running that day. In 2006, No. 475 celebrated its 100th birthday. In 2010 and 2017, No. 475 was cosmetically altered to resemble its extinct sister locomotive No. 382 for Lerro Productions' Virginia Creeper photo charters as a tribute to O. Winston Link's photography work.

In late 2018, it was taken out of service for its 15-year mandated Federal Railroad Administration (FRA) inspection and rebuild. It returns to active service in September 2019, backdated to its 1940s-50s appearance with the headlight being mounted to the center of the smokebox door. That same month, No. 475 was reunited with No. 611, which visited the SRC between 2021 and 2023. This would mark the first time since 1991 that two ex-N&W steam locomotives operated together (Nos. 611 and 1218). No. 475 was also backdated to resemble No. 382 again for the double header photo runbys with No. 611. On January 11, 2025, No. 475 masqueraded as No. 429 for the Dynamo Productions nighttime photo charter.

==== Accident ====
"I elected not to have them do that, to leave it as a ‘witness mark’ to remind our crews"

— Brendan Zeigler

On November 2, 2022, while running around a passenger train at Leaman Place Junction in Paradise, No. 475 collided head-on with an excavator parked on a siding. The impact punched a hole in the front smokebox plate, giving minor damage to the cinder screen netting, shattered the smokebox door and knocked the headlight onto the ground. Luckily, the excavator arm did not puncture the locomotive's front flue sheet, while none of the crew or passengers were injured, and the damage done was deemed relatively minor. The collision was broadcast live via Virtual Railfan camera and was caught on video via cellphone by one of the passengers on board the train that day. The accident was caused by a misaligned switch, which was left opened by a maintenance of way (MOW) worker the night prior. SRC's EMD SW8 diesel switcher No. 8618 was called in to take No. 475's train back to East Strasburg and later returned to Leaman Place Junction in the evening to tow the damaged No. 475 locomotive to the SRC workshop for repairs.

SRC announced on November 3, the day after the accident, that repairs on the No. 475 locomotive had begun. No. 475 was repaired and returned to service on November 7 with a new front smokebox plate and headlight since the originals were completely destroyed. The smokebox door itself was repaired by braze-welding the broken shards together, along with the addition of a reinforcing steel ring on the inside of the door. The decision was made by SRC's chief mechanical officer Brendan Zeigler to leave the welded seams from the brazing process visible on the door as a reminder of the incident.

== Appearances in media ==
No. 475 was featured in the 2000 movie Thomas and the Magic Railroad. An interview with SRC's former Chief Mechanical Officer Linn Moedinger, who revealed that the film's producer Phil Fehrle called him looking for an American locomotive to use. When Moedinger inquired as to what exactly he was looking for, Fehrle told him that the film's director, Britt Allcroft liked the locomotives pictured in a book by O. Winston Link, in particular the M class locomotives (of which 475 is a member). During filming, No. 475 and three of Strasburg's passenger cars (of which only two were used) were lettered for the fictional Indian Valley Railroad. The locomotive ventured off SRC trackage to the Harrisburg Transportation Center in Harrisburg. The ferry-move to Harrisburg from Leaman Place by Amtrak, as well as the filming, was unannounced so as not to attract a crowd.

== See also ==
- Canadian National 89
- Canadian National 7312
- Great Western 90
- Norfolk and Western 433
- Norfolk and Western 578
- Norfolk and Western 1218

== Bibliography ==
- Bell, Kurt (September 1995). "N&W 475: From Blacksburg to Strasburg". Railfan & Railroad. Vol. 14, no. 9. Carstens Publications. pp. 46–50.
- Conner, Eric; Barrall, Steve (2017). Strasburg Rail Road. Images of Rail (1st ed.). Arcadia Publishing. ISBN 978-1-4671-2507-9.
- Jeffries, Lewis (2005). N&W: Giant of Steam, Revised Edition (2nd ed.). Norfolk and Western Historical Society, Inc. ISBN 0-9704794-5-X.
- King, Ed (1998). Norfolk & Western in the Appalachians: From the Blue Ridge to the Big Sandy. The Golden Year of Railroading (1st ed.). Kalmbach Publishing. ISBN 0-89024-316-6.
- Nichols, Jim (1997). Norfolk & Western in Color Volume 1: 1954-1964 (1st ed.). Morning Sun Books. ISBN 1-878887-72-6.
