= China Railways JS =

Class of Chinese steam locomotives

JS; 建设
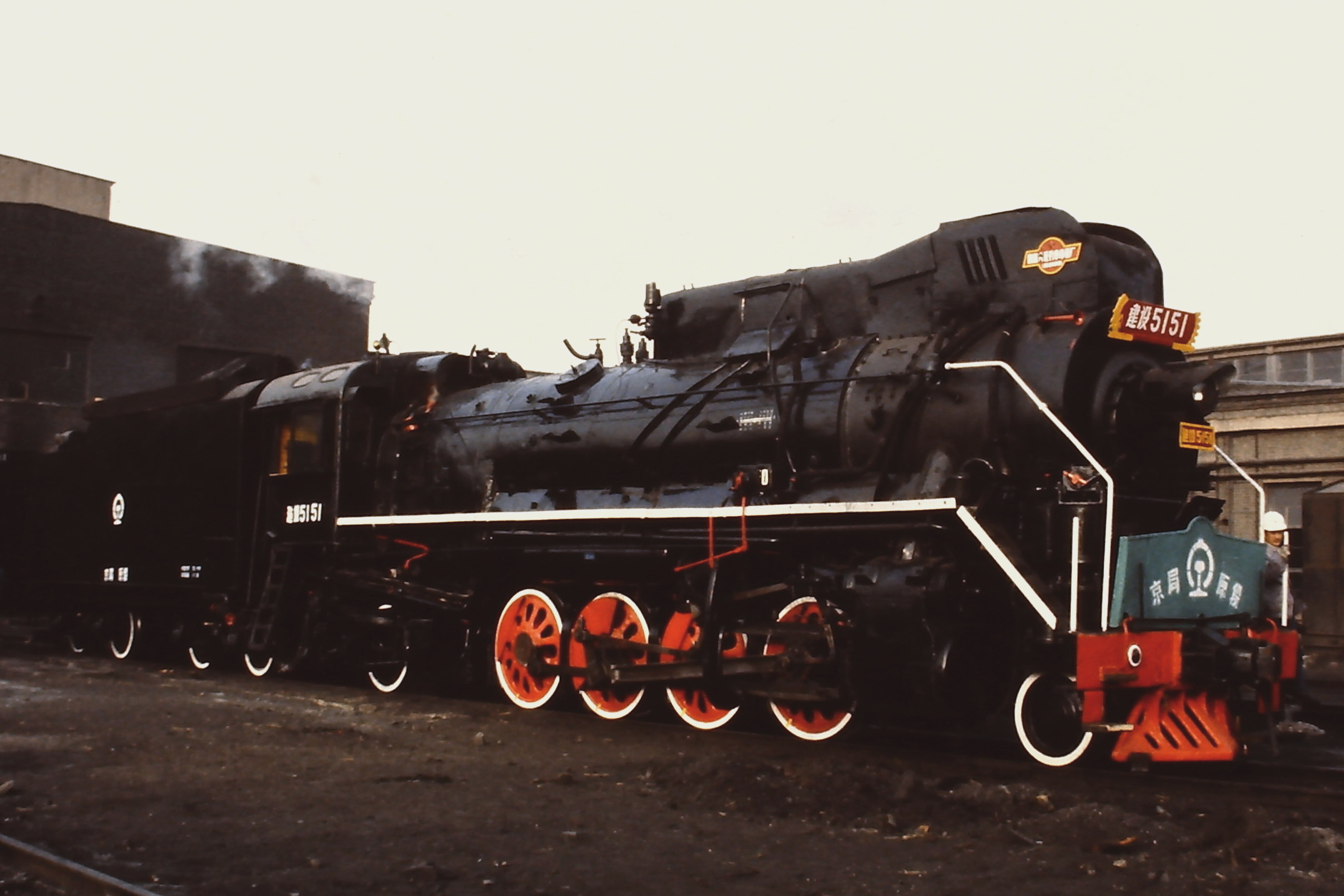
- JS-5151 on 7 November 1984
Type and origin
- Power type: Steam
- Builder: Dalian Locomotive Works; Qishuyan Locomotive and Rolling Stock Works; Datong Locomotive Works; Beijing 7th Feb Works
- Model: JS
- Build date: 1957–1965, 1981–1988
- Total produced: 1,916
Specifications
- Configuration
  - Whyte: 2-8-2
- Gauge: 1,435 mm (4 ft 8 1/2 in)
- Leading dia.: 840 mm (33 in; 2.76 ft)
- Driver dia.: 1,370 mm (54 in; 4.49 ft)
- Trailing dia.: 1,120 mm (44 in; 3.67 ft)
- Tender wheels: 1,000 mm (39 in; 3.3 ft)
- Minimum curve: 145 m (476 ft)
- Wheelbase: 4.419 m (14 ft 5.98 in) (fixed); 10.192 m (33 ft 5.3 in) (locoo); 20.487 m (67 ft 2.6 in) (total loco + tender)
- Length: Total: 23,370 mm (920 in; 76.67 ft) (loco + tender)
- Width: 3,150 mm (124 in; 10.33 ft)
- Height: 4,711 mm (185.5 in; 15.456 ft)
- Adhesive weight: 79.78 t (78.52 long tons; 87.94 short tons) (adhesive weight)
- Loco weight: 104 t (229,000 lb; 104,000 kg); 101.5 t (224,000 lb; 101,500 kg) (8000 series)
- Tender weight: 82–85.7 t (181,000–189,000 lb; 82,000–85,700 kg)
- Fuel type: Coal
- Tender cap.: 15–16 t (33,000–35,000 lb; 15,000–16,000 kg) (coal), 35,000 L (9,200 US gal) (water)
- Firebox
  - Grate area: 5.09 m^{2} (54.8 sq ft)
- Boiler
  - Diameter: 1,944 mm (76.5 in); 1,908 mm (75.1 in) (8000 series)
- Boiler pressure: 217.5 psi (1,500 kPa)
- Heating surface: 181 m^{2} (1,948.3 sq ft)
- Superheater
  - Heating area: 89 m^{2} (958.0 sq ft)
- Cylinders: Two, outside
- Cylinder size: 580 mm × 710 mm (22.835 in × 27.953 in); bore x stroke
- Valve gear: Walschaerts
- Valve type: Piston valves
- Valve travel: 161 mm (6.3 in)
- Loco brake: Air
- Train brakes: Air
- Couplers: Knuckle
Performance figures
- Maximum speed: 85 km/h (53 mph)
- Power output: 2,270 hp (1,690 kW)
- Tractive effort: 250 kN (25,000 kgf; 56,000 lbf) (247.7 kN (25,260 kgf; 55,700 lbf), 261.5 kN (26,670 kgf; 58,800 lbf)) (Note: Sources disagree on the official tractive force.)
Career
- Operators: China Railway; Boone and Scenic Valley Railroad
- Number in class: 1,916 (Note: Sources disagree on how many were built; one claimed 1,921.)
- Numbers: 5001–6135, 6201–6558, 8001–8423
- Delivered: 1957
- First run: 1957
- Last run: January 2024
- Retired: 15 January 2024
- Preserved: 30
- Disposition: 30 preserved (29 in China, 2 in USA), remainder scrapped

The China Railways JS (Chinese: 建设; pinyin: Jiàn Shè; lit. 'Construction or Development') are a type of 2-8-2 "Mikado" type steam locomotives, they were manufactured for use on mainline freight trains, passenger trains, as well as for heavy shunting.

== History ==
The JS class was first developed in 1957 at the Dalian Locomotive Works, as freight locomotives. The JS design was an evolution of the JF1 class, and it retained multiple JF1 features, including the chassis. But it also incorporated features from the QJ class 2-10-2s: a Soviet-inspired all-welded boiler, Trofimov valves, a Worthington feedwater heater above the smokebox, oil lubricators for the axleboxes, and an eight-wheeled welded tender design.

The JS was also more powerful than the JF1s, with a boiler pressure of 217.5 psi (1,500 kPa), a superheater area of 89 square metres (960 sq ft), a tractive force of 25,476 kilograms-force (56,160 pounds-force), and a driving wheel diameter of 1,370 mm (54 inches). The JS designation (Chinese: 建设; pinyin: Jiàn Shè; lit. 'Construction or Development') possibly got its influence from a slogan that lead to the Great Leap Forward (Chinese: 全力以赴、志存高远，在社会主义建设中取得更大、更快、更好、更省的成果。; lit. 'Go all out', 'aim high', 'and achieve greater', 'faster', 'better and more economical results in building socialism.').

Dalian constructed the first prototype JS in July 1957, and production on the class began in September that same year. From 1958 to 1961, Qishuyan Locomotive and Rolling Stock Works and the Beijing 7th Feb Works collectively produced 278 JS locomotives. Dalian ended their production in 1961, having built 757. From July 1963 to May 1965, the Datong Locomotive Works built 100 JS locomotives, and they brought the original JS total to 1,135. The visual appearances of the JS classes varied: they had varying lengths for their front steps; most would be built with a skyline casing that covered the chimney; and some were fitted with varying sizes of smoke deflectors.

The JS locomotives were initially used for mainline freight services, but in later years, they were mostly reassigned to secondary passenger services, short-distance transfer services, yard shunting, and services in industrial areas. In the latter, the JSs would commonly shunt and haul trains slightly too heavy for SY 2-8-2s.

In 1981, Datong, which by then was one of only two remaining Chinese factories to mass-produce steam locomotives, resumed JS production. At that time, some minor alterations were made to the JS design, including the removal of the mechanical stoker from JS-6240-onwards, and 358 locomotives were built accordingly.

Table of numbers and details
| Years | Quantity | Manufacturer | Numbers | Notes |
|---|---|---|---|---|
| 1957–1961 | 757 | Dalian | 5001–5100, 5121–5243, 5254–5300, 5521–5578, 5601–6060, 6062, 6067, 6107–6111 | Some locomotives within the 5601–6060 tranche were reportedly built by other factories: 5801–5804 by a BaoGang factory; and 5805–5809 and 6001–6004 by an Anshan factory |
| 1958–1961 | 257 | Qishuyan | 5301–5320, 5322–5500, 5521–5578 | |
| 1958–1961 | 21 | Beijing | 5321, 5501–5520 | |
| 1963–1965 | 100 | Datong | 5101–5120, 5006, 5083, 5244–5253, 5579–5600, 6061, 6063–6066, 6068–6106, 6401, 6112 | 5006 and 5083 were replacements for those that had been written off in accidents |
| 1981–1986 | 358 | Datong | 6201–6558 | |
| 1986–1988 | 423 | Datong | 8001–8423 | This tranche of locomotives received the 'B' specification, as they received major design changes from the earlier batches. One JS (8419) was purchased and exported to the Boone and Scenic Valley Railroad of Iowa, USA. |

In 1986, the JS design was revised with major alterations, and they received a 'B' specification for them. The alterations included their alligator crosshead guides being replaced with single slide bar guides; their boilers being smaller in diameter; their feedwater heaters being removed; their tenders being modified with a greater capacity and simpler bogies; and the locomotive weight overall being made lighter than the older JSs by 2.5 tonnes (5,500 pounds). 423 locomotives of the revised design were built until 1988. The final total of JS locomotives of all types produced was 1,916.

Mainline service for the JS classes ended in late December 2005 when the railway was dieselized, however, several of them would continue in service for some industrial firms, such as the Sandaoling Coal Mine Railway in the Xinjiang Uyghur Autonomous Region.

On 25 April 2022, when Sandaoling discontinued their regular steam operations, they continued to use their JS classes as backups to their Diesel motive power. The last JS class, JS-8089 that operated at Sandaoling, was retired from service on 15 January 2024, which officially ended all regular steam operations in China.

== Numbering ==
Locomotives produced from 1957 to 1965 were numbered JS-5001 to JS-6135. Starting at 5001 avoided overlapping the numbers of the various types of JF occupying the 1 - 4100 (approx) range. Locomotives produced at Datong in the early 1980s were numbered JS-6201 to JS-6558; after the introduction of the revised 'B' specification the locomotives were numbered JS-8001 to JS-8423. A small number of locomotives operating outside the scope of the ministry of railways (industrial railways) received different number designations.

== Preservation ==
=== 5000 series ===
- JS-5001: is preserved at the China Railway Museum.
- JS-5003: is preserved at Shenyang Railway Museum.
- JS-5039: is preserved at Beijing Exhibition Center.
- JS-5301: is preserved at Taiyuan Locomotive Depot, Taiyuan Railway Bureau.
- JS-5342: is preserved at Weifang Railway Station.

=== 6000 series ===
- JS-6023: is preserved at China Tiesiju Civil Engineering Group Co., Ltd.
- JS-6244: is preserved at Nanchang Fenghuangzhou Park (Now renamed JS-6289).
- JS-6499: is preserved at Hainan Railway Museum.
- JS-6500: is preserved at Guangzhou Railway Museum.
- JS-6501: is preserved at the Dashatou Railway Park.
- JS-6532: is preserved at Nanjing Railway Vacational Technical College.
- JS-6533: is preserved at Shandong Architecture University (Now renamed JS-5610).

=== 8000 series ===
- JS-8010: is preserved at Central South University (Now renamed JS-1953).
- JS-8024: is preserved at Jinhua Vocational Technical College.
- JS-8077: is preserved at Zhengzhou Century Amusement Park (Now renamed JS-8001).
- JS-8089: is Retired on January 15, 2024, and preserved on static display at Sandaoling, China.
- JS-8145: is preserved at Xuhui Riverside Park, Shanghai.
- JS-8239: is preserved at Gongchangling Iron, Liaoyang.
- JS-8260: is preserved at Songhu Railway's Jiangwan Station Former Site, Shanghai.
- JS-8284: is preserved at Liuzhou Railway Vacational Technical College.
- JS-8297: is preserved at Nanxiang Power Locomotive Maintenance Base, Shanghai Railway Bureau.
- JS-8316: is preserved at Yuanzhou District NO.6 Middle School, Guyuan.
- JS-8325: is preserved at Tianjin Railway Vacational Technical College.
- JS-8328: is preserved at Southwest Jiaotong University.
- JS-8343: is preserved at Yantai Railway Station.
- JS-8347: is preserved at Hangzhou Baita Park.
- JS-8376: is preserved at Liuzhou Locomotive Depot, Nanning Railway Bureau (Now renamed JS-1939).
- JS-8401: is preserved at Hangzhou Jiangshu Railway Heritage Park.
- JS-8406: is preserved at Hangzhou Paradise.
- JS-8419: is operational at the Boone and Scenic Valley Railroad in Iowa, USA.
- JS-8422: is preserved at Tianjin Binhai Xinjiayuan Railway Cultural Recreation Street.

== Gallery ==
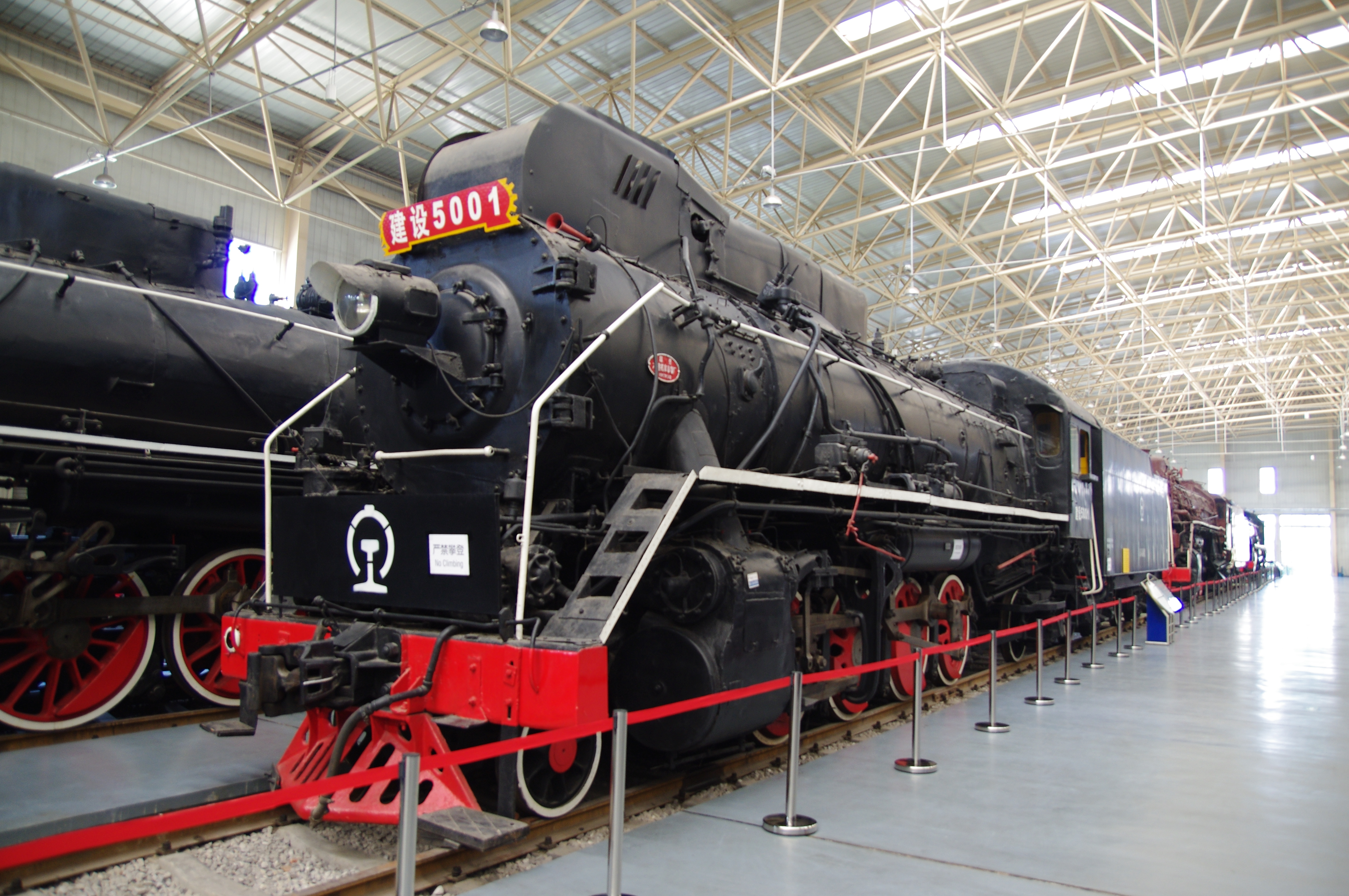
JS-5001 on display at the China Railway Museum

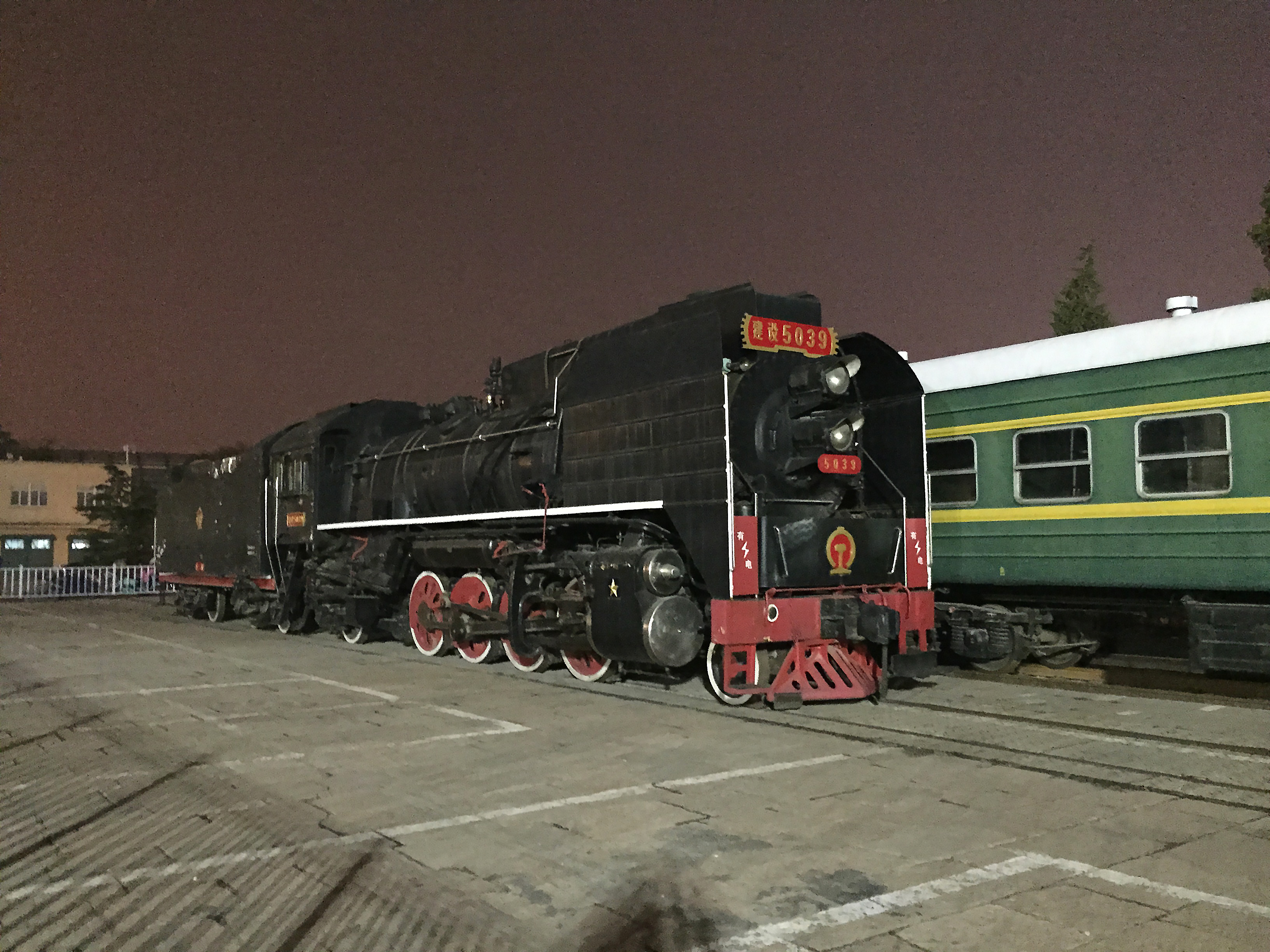
JS-5039 on display are the Beijing Exhibition Center

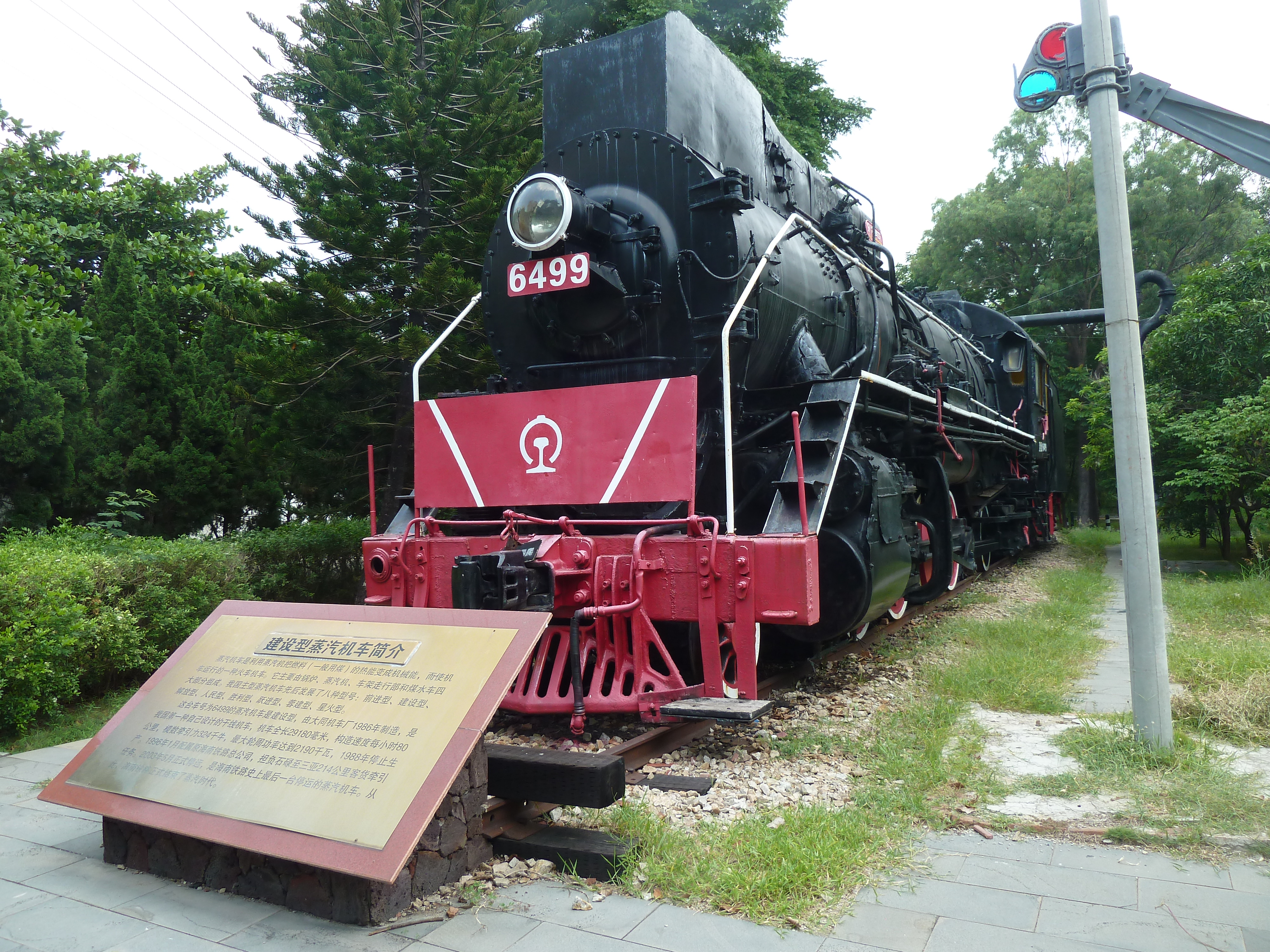
JS-6499 on display at the Hainan Railway Museum

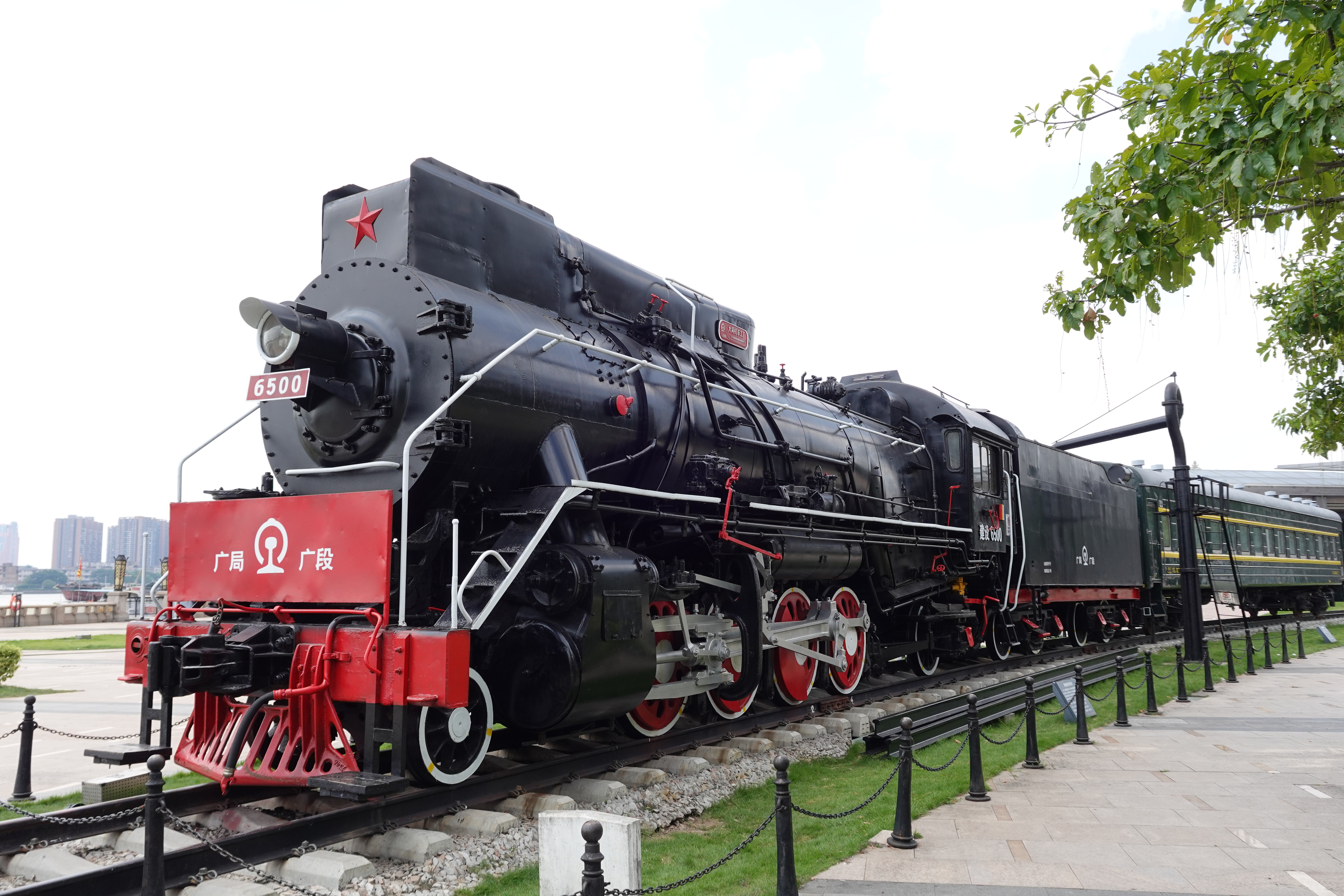
JS-6500 on display at the Guangzhou Railway Museum

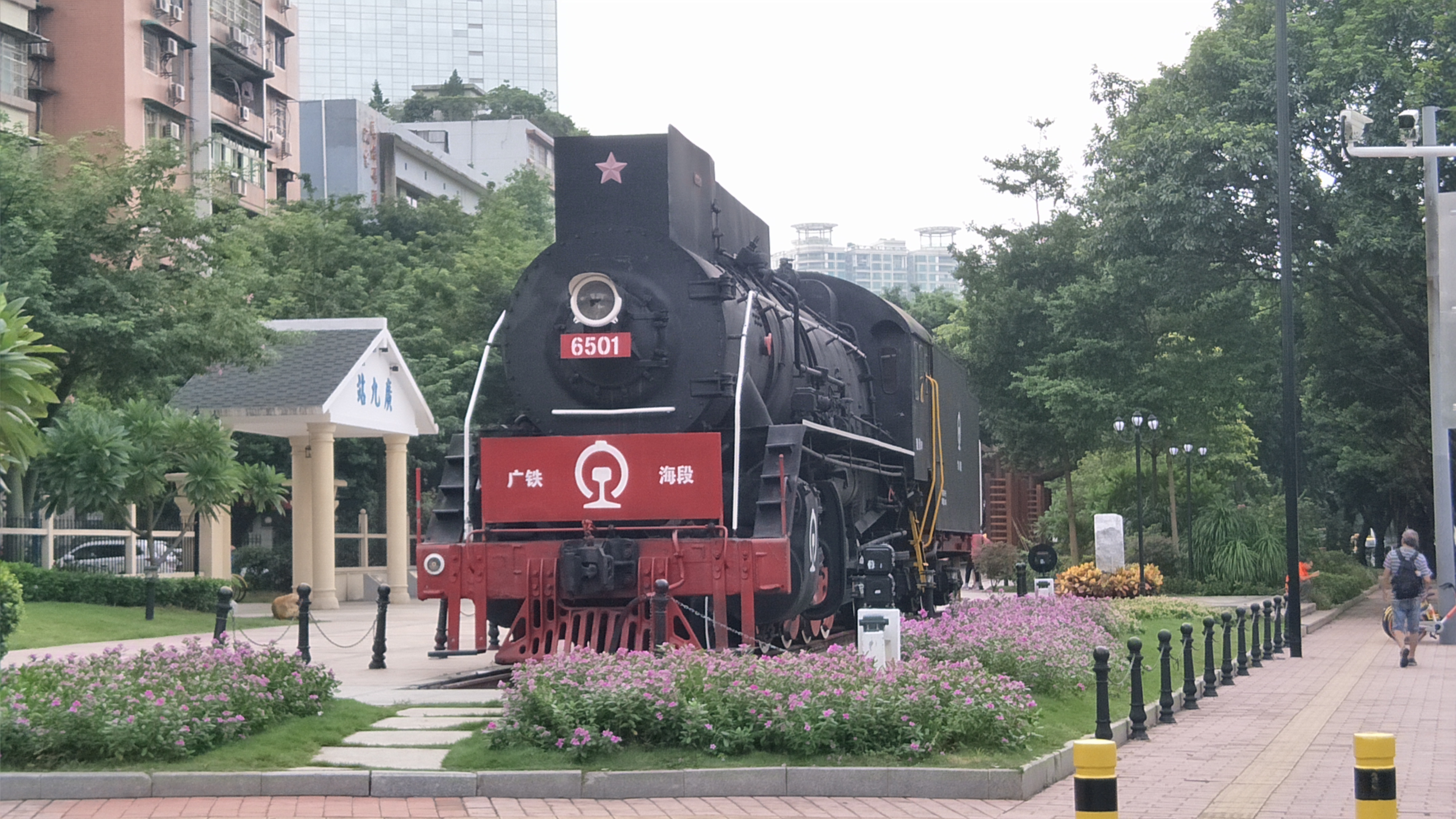
JS-6501 on display at the Dashatou Railway Park

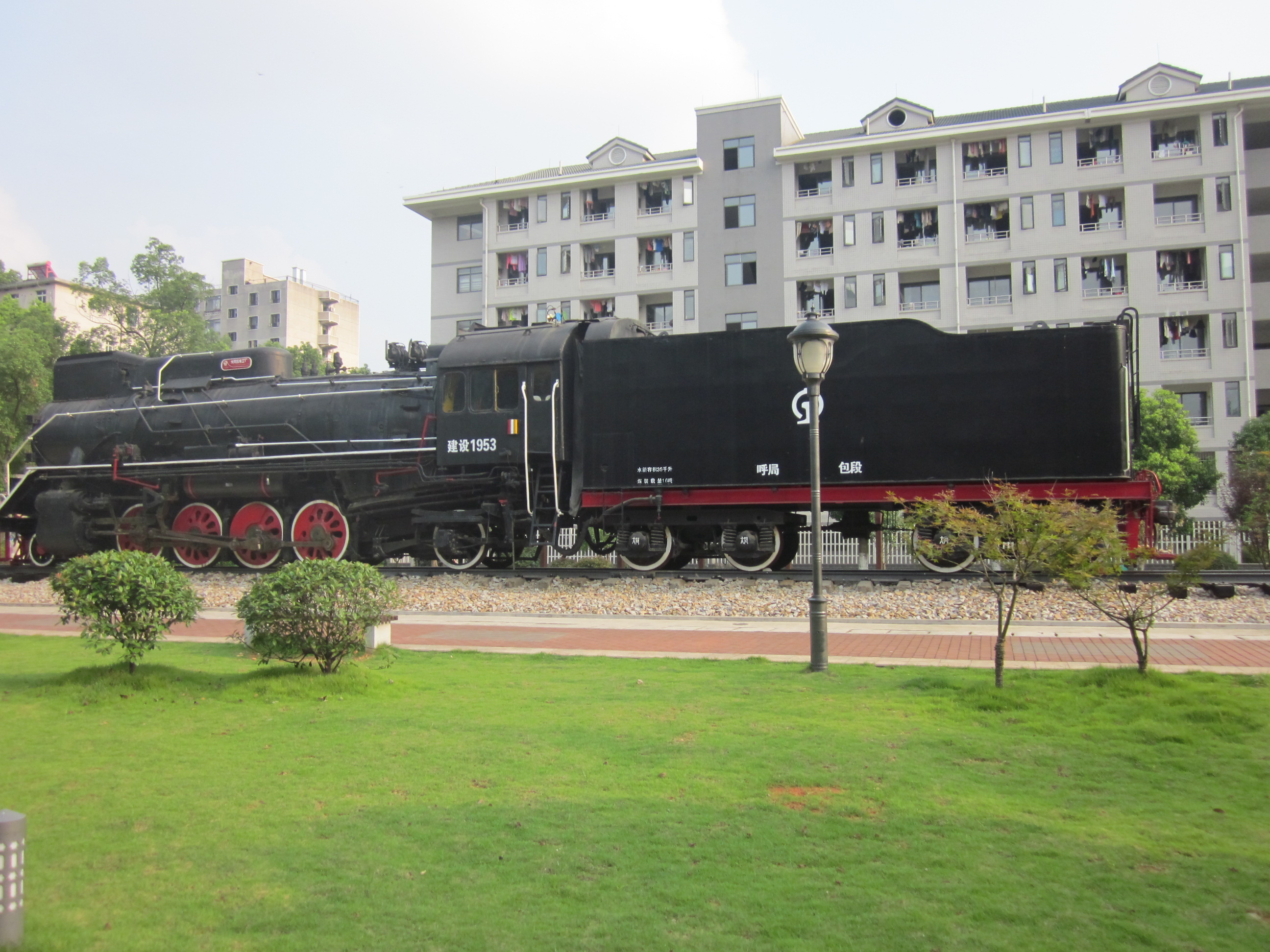
JS-8010 (1953) on display at the Central South University

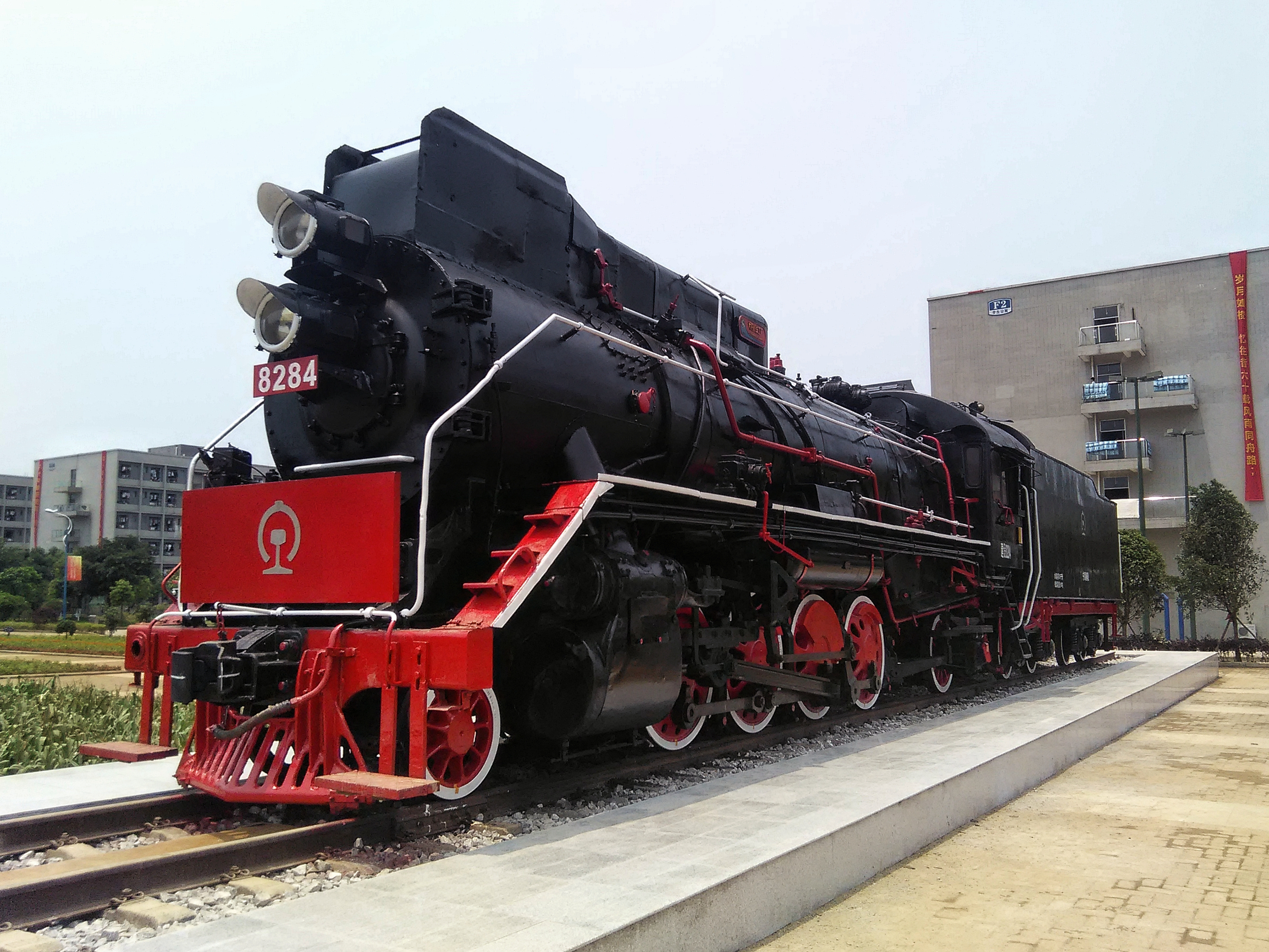
JS-8284 on display at the Liuzhou Railway Vacational Technical College

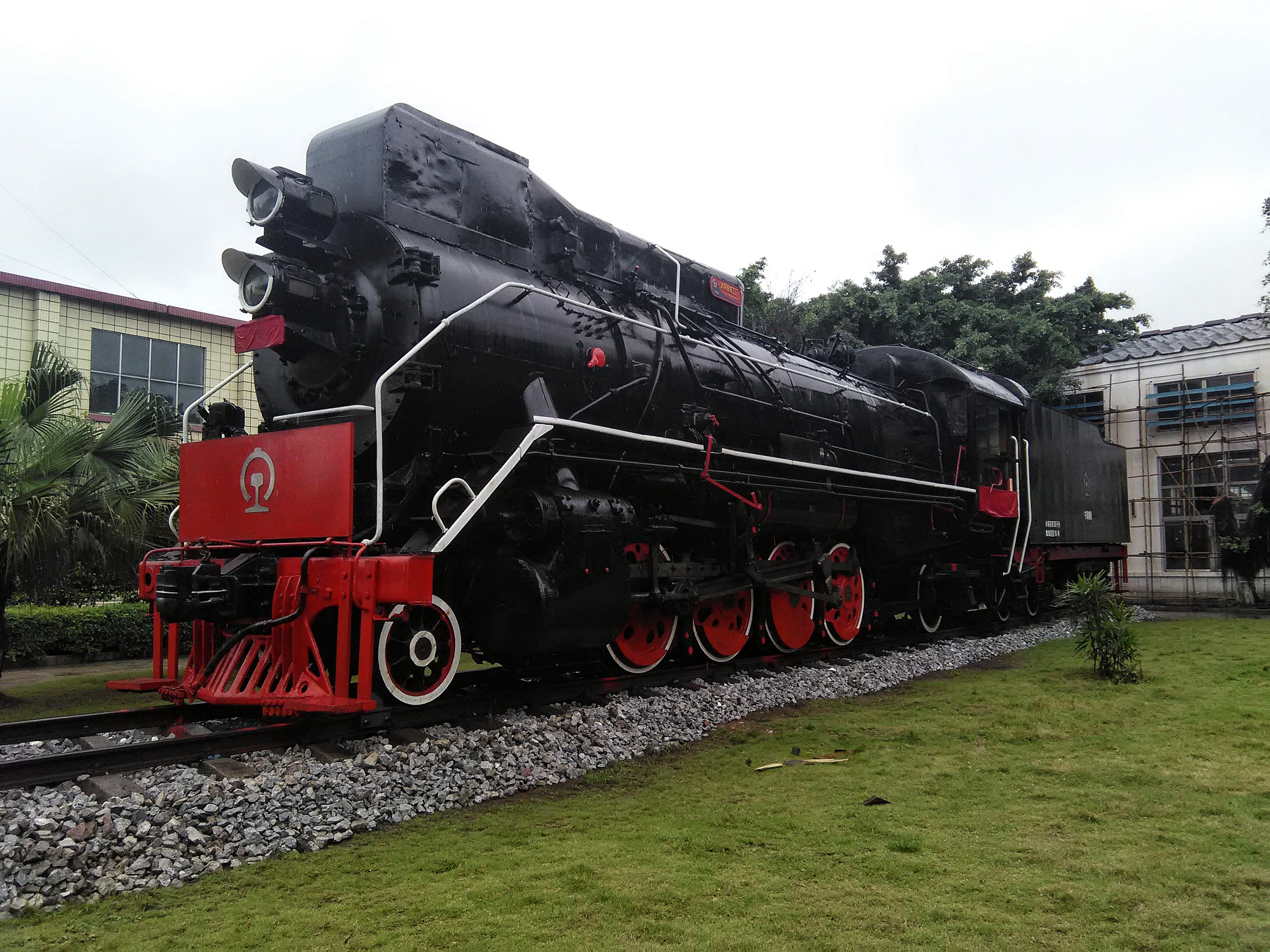
JS-8376 on display at the Liuzhou Locomotive Depot

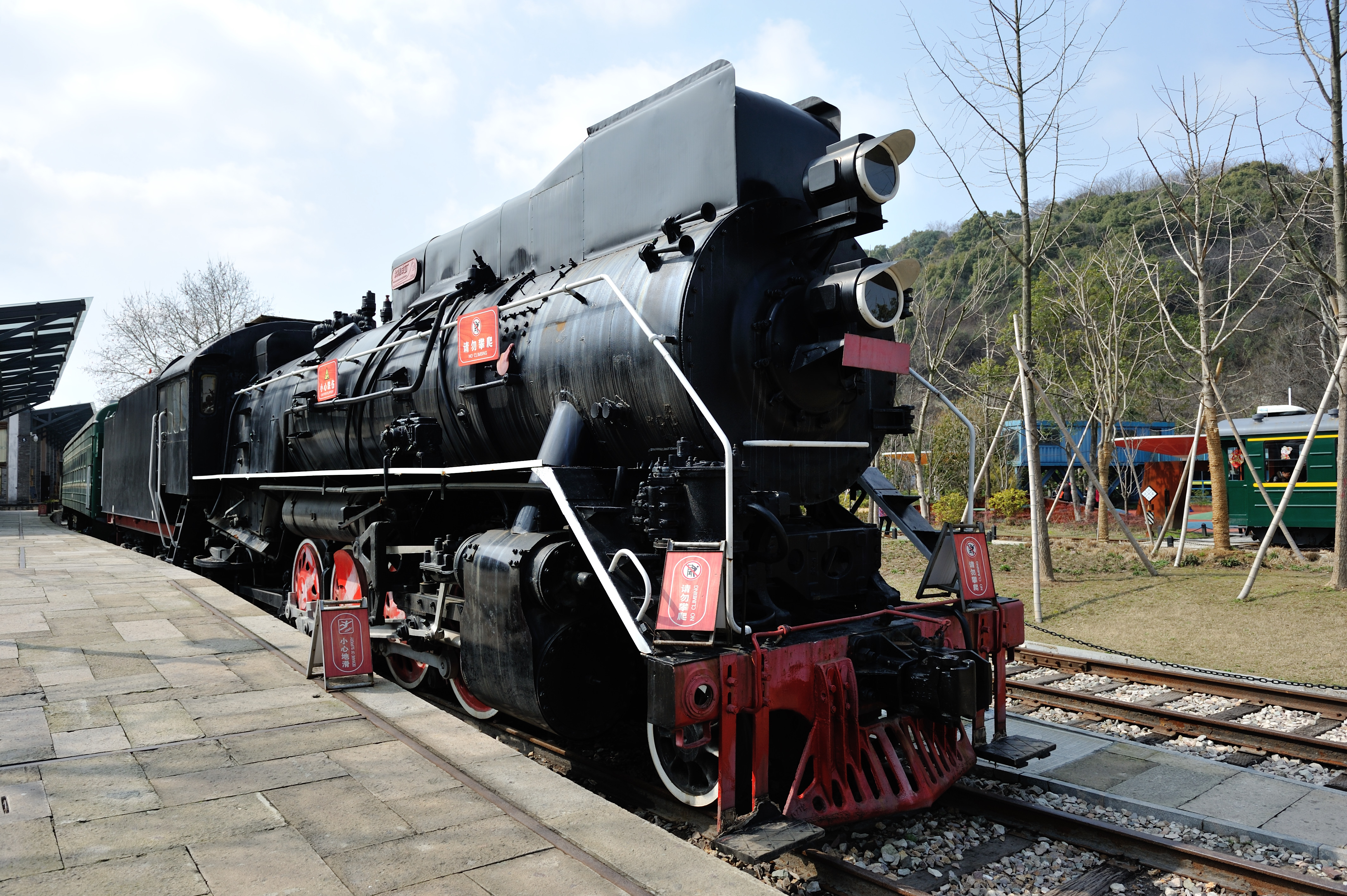
JS-8401 on display at the Hangzhou Baita Park

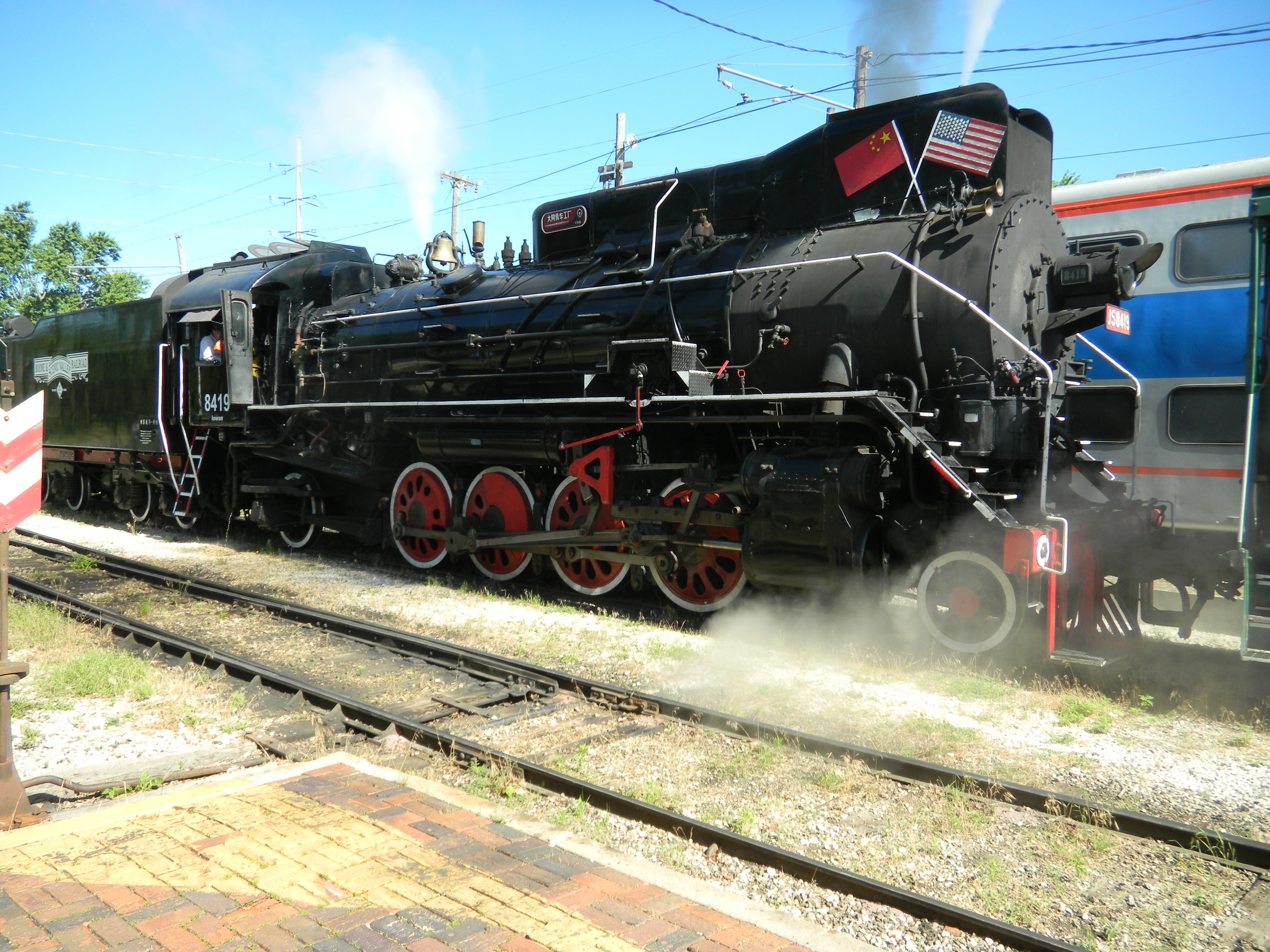
JS-8419 operating on the Boone and Scenic Valley Railroad in Boone, Iowa, United States

== Bibliography ==
- Gibbons, Robin (2015). Locomotives of China - The JF1 and JS Classes: History and Allocation of the Chinese JF1 and JS Class Steam Locomotives. Tynedale Publishing. ISBN 978-0993419201.
