= Crab Orchard and Egyptian 17 =

Preserved Canadian 2-8-0 locomotive

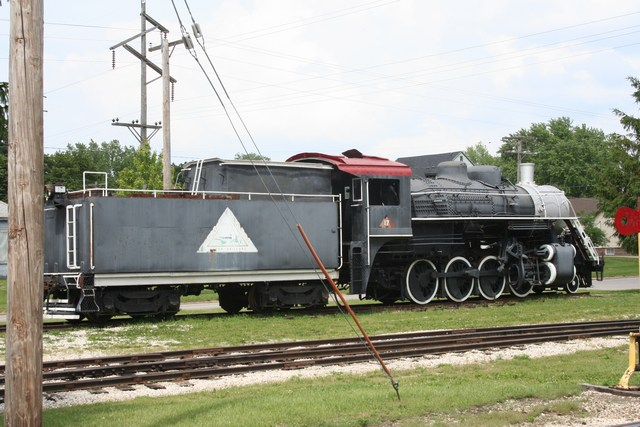
- No. 17 on static display at the Boone and Scenic Valley Railroad in Boone, Iowa, June 8, 2007
Type and origin
- Power type: Steam
- Builder: Canadian Locomotive Company
- Serial number: 1965
- Build date: January 1940
Specifications
- Configuration
  - Whyte: 2-8-0
- Gauge: 4 ft 8 1/2 in (1,435 mm) standard gauge
- Driver dia.: 57 in (1,400 mm)
- Loco weight: 182,000 lb (83,000 kg)
- Fuel type: Coal
- Fuel capacity: 10 long tons (10 t)
- Water cap.: 5,000 US gallons (19,000 L; 4,200 imp gal)
- Boiler pressure: 200 psi (1.38 MPa)
- Cylinders: Two, outside
- Cylinder size: 22.5 in × 28 in (572 mm × 711 mm)
- Valve gear: Stephenson
- Valve type: Piston valves
- Loco brake: Air
- Train brakes: Air
- Couplers: Knuckle
Performance figures
- Tractive effort: 35,100 lbf (156 kN)
Career
- Operators: Roberval and Saguenay Railway; Crab Orchard and Egyptian Railway
- Numbers: RS 17; COER 17
- Retired: 1963 (1st revenue service); September 8, 1986 (2nd revenue service)
- Restored: May 10, 1979 (1st revenue service); July 2020 (cosmetically)
- Current owner: Boone Rotary Club
- Disposition: On static display

Crab Orchard and Egyptian 17 is a preserved 2-8-0 "Consolidation" type steam locomotive, built in 1940 by the Canadian Locomotive Company (CLC) for the Roberval and Saguenay Railway (RS). It was the final steam locomotive in the United States to be regularly and exclusively used for commercial freight service, with its final assignments occurring in 1986.

== History ==
No. 17 was built in January 1940 by the Canadian Locomotive Company (CLC) for the Roberval and Saguenay Railway (RS), where it spent decades hauling aluminum ore material trains along with sister engine No. 16, making it the last 2-8-0 built for service in Canada. It served the RS for twenty-two years until 1962, when it was placed into standby service. In the early 1960s, No. 17 was retired from revenue service and was stored outside of the Canadian National Railways (CN) Jonquière, Quebec railyard for several years.

In May 1971, No. 17 was purchased by railfan John Thompson of Chicago, Illinois, who put it in storage at the Central Vermont Railway (CV) roundhouse in New London, Connecticut in July 1973. In early 1975, it was sold to the Crab Orchard and Egyptian Railway (COER) for use on their freight services.

That same year, the railroad began restoring No. 17 to operating condition, which took four years to complete. On May 10, 1979, No. 17's restoration was completed and it moved under its own power again for the first time since the early 1960s. It eventually began hauling revenue freight trains the following month in July, replacing St. Louis, Iron Mountain and Southern Railway 5, which was withdrawn from service that same year.

On the afternoon of September 8, 1986, the No. 17 was out switching coal hoppers when the dry-pipe inside the boiler suddenly collapsed, putting the engine out of service indefinitely unless another major overhaul could be performed on it. However, the repairs were deemed too costly. No. 17 was forced into retirement once again, making it the last regularly operating steam locomotive used exclusively for commercial freight service. SW1200 No. 1147 was eventually brought out and finished the rest of the day's work.

On February 9, 1987, No. 17 was sold to the Boone and Scenic Valley Railroad (BSVY) in Boone, Iowa, which hoped to restore it for their tourist operations, but its mechanical problems were deemed too extensive and costly, and it was subsequently put on static display.

In early 1990, the Strasburg Rail Road (SRC) made an offer to purchase No. 17, along with Norfolk and Western 475, for use in their own tourist operations in Strasburg, Pennsylvania, but the BSVY declined, and only No. 475 was sold.

On July 23, 2020, No. 17 was donated to the Boone Rotary Club and was moved by truck to U.S. Highway 30 of South Story Street of Boone, Iowa, where it received a cosmetic restoration and was put on display.

== Sources ==
- Conner, Eric; Barrall, Steve (2017). Strasburg Rail Road. Images of Rail (1st ed.). Arcadia Publishing. p. 73. ISBN 978-1-4671-2507-9.
- Kerr, James W. (2006). The Official Locomotive Roster & News Edition 2006 (5th ed.). St. David's, ON: DPA-LTA Enterprises Inc. ISBN 0-919295-43-6.
