= St. Louis, Iron Mountain and Southern Railway 5 =

Steam locomotive in Missouri

St. Louis, Iron Mountain and Southern 5
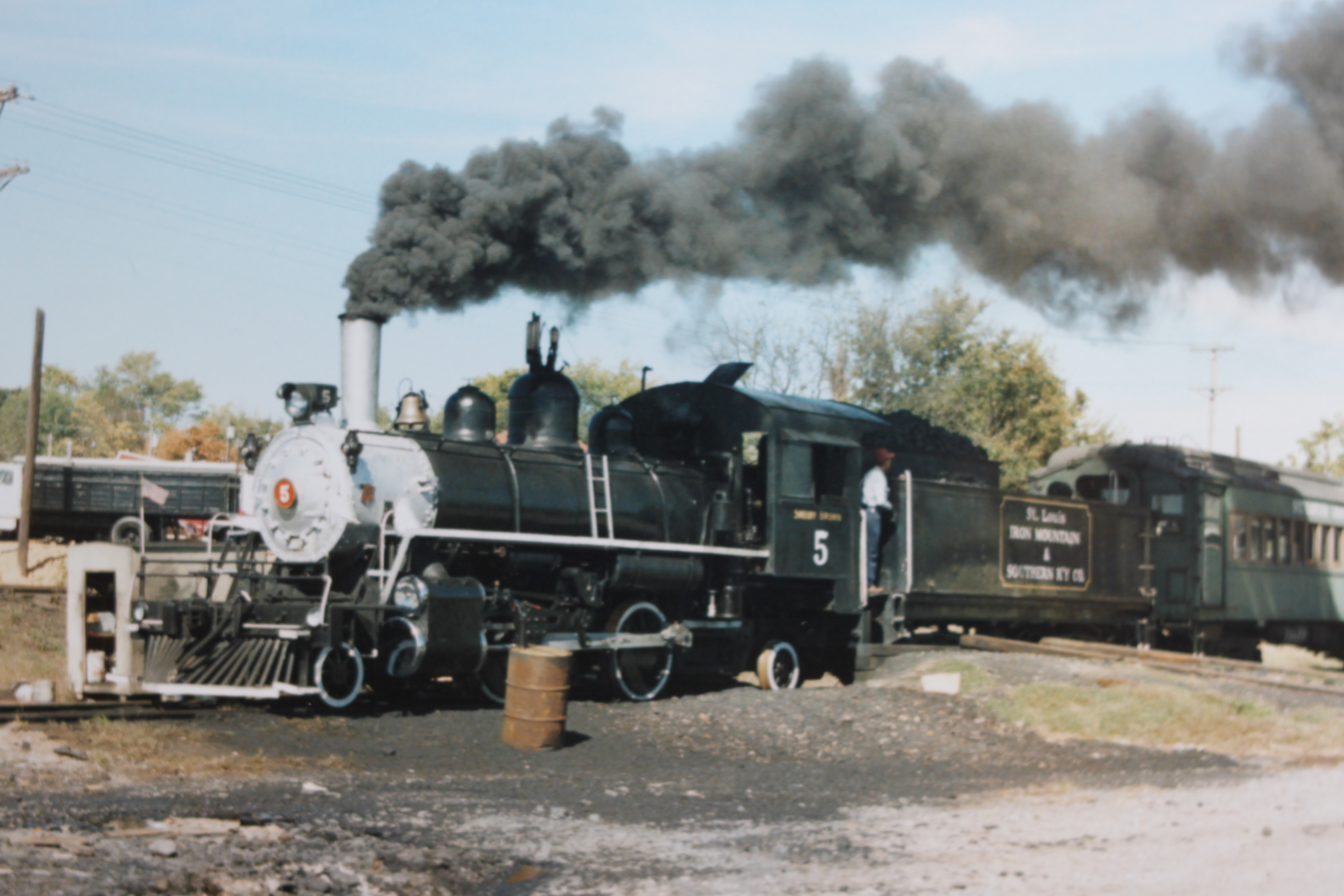
- No. 5 running an excursion train through Jackson, Missouri, 1990
Type and origin
- Power type: Steam
- Builder: H.K. Porter, Inc.
- Serial number: 7995
- Build date: June 1946
- Rebuild date: 1974
Specifications
- Configuration
  - Whyte: 2-4-2
  - UIC: 1'B'1
- Gauge: 4 ft 8 1/2 in (1,435 mm)
- Driver dia.: 42 inches (1.067 m)
- Adhesive weight: 64,000 pounds (29,000 kg)
- Loco weight: 90,000 pounds (41,000 kg)
- Fuel type: Coal
- Boiler pressure: 190 pounds per square inch (1.31 MPa)
- Cylinders: Two, outside
- Cylinder size: 16 by 24 inches (406 mm × 610 mm)
- Valve gear: Walschaerts
- Valve type: Piston valves
- Loco brake: Air
- Train brakes: Air
- Couplers: Knuckle
Performance figures
- Tractive effort: 23,550 pounds-force (104.76 kN)
Career
- Operators: Central Illinois Public Service Company; Crab Orchard and Egyptian Railway; St. Louis, Iron Mountain and Southern Railway
- Class: N/A
- Numbers: CIPX 5; MCRY 5; COER 5; SLOT 5
- Retired: 1963 (revenue service); October 1979 (1st excursion service); 1999 (2nd excursion service)
- Restored: May 29, 1973 (1st excursion service); 1986 (2nd excursion service)
- Current owner: St. Louis, Iron Mountain and Southern Railway
- Disposition: Stored, awaiting restoration

St. Louis, Iron Mountain and Southern Railway 5 is a 2-4-2 "Columbian" type steam locomotive. It was originally built by H.K. Porter, Inc. in 1946 as a saddle tank engine for the Central Illinois Public Service Company (CIPX). In 1963, No. 5 was donated to the Mid-Continent Railway Museum (MCRY) in North Freedom, Wisconsin as a static display. In 1971 it was sold to the Crab Orchard and Egyptian Railway (COER) and restored to operating condition for passenger excursions and occasional freight runs. During this time it was converted to a tender engine. In 1985, No. 5 was sold again to the St. Louis, Iron Mountain and Southern Railway (SLOT), who used it on tourist trips in Missouri one year later until 1999. Today, No. 5 is under restoration to return to operation.

== History ==
=== Early years ===
No. 5 was built by H.K. Porter, Incorporated in June 1946 as one of their last steam engines built during their decline. Built as a saddle tank engine, No. 5 was initially used by the Central Illinois Public Service Company for switching coal cars around a rail yard in Meredosia, Illinois. No. 5 was withdrawn in 1963 and was one of three steam engines the Central Illinois Company donated to the Mid-Continent Railway Museum, the other two being No. 6 (formerly E.I. Dupont Company #4) and No. 7 (formerly New York Central No. 6721).

=== Crab Orchard and Egyptian Ownership ===
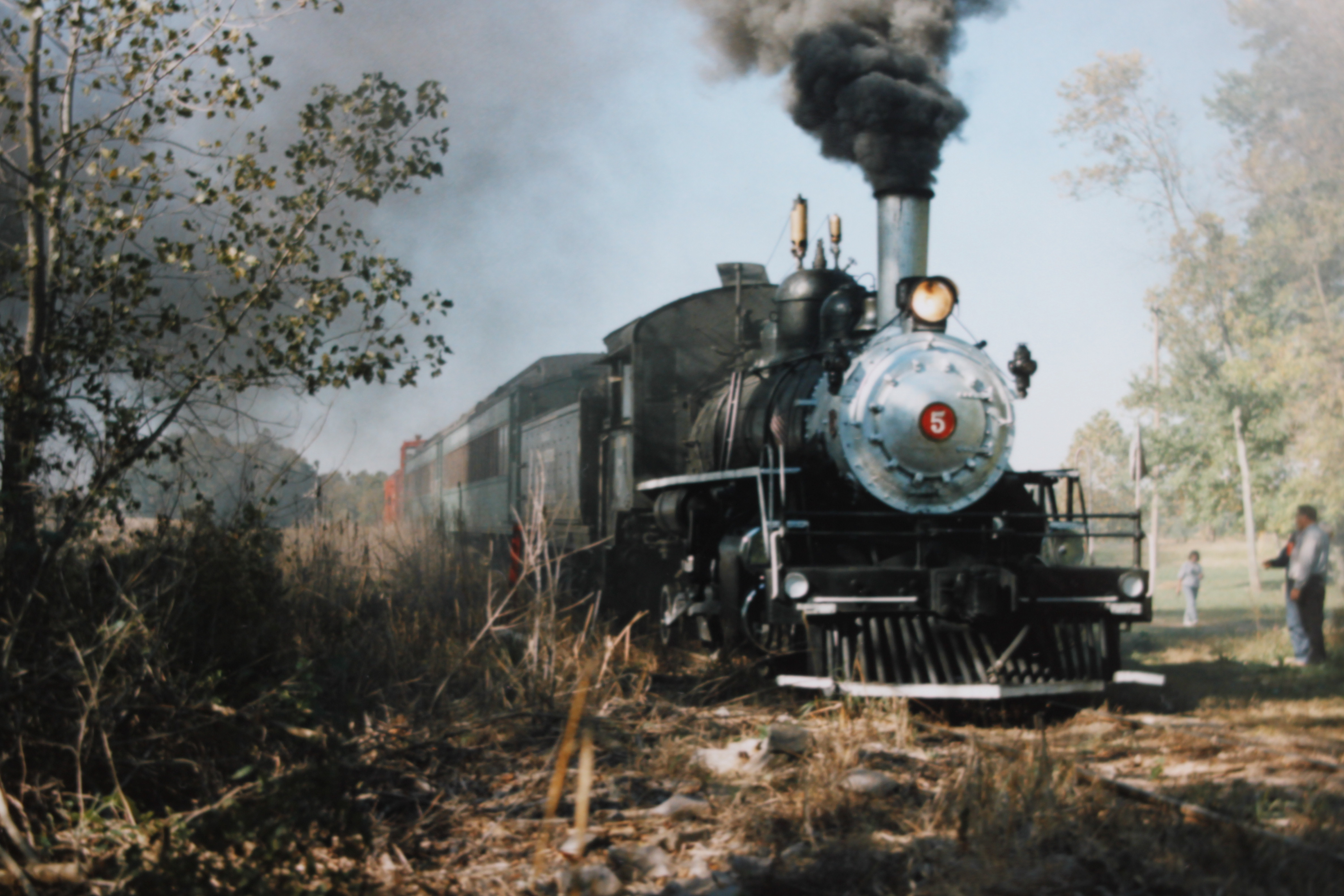
No. 5 hauling an excursion train on the COER

In 1971, No. 5 was acquired by the newly-established Crab Orchard and Egyptian Railway (COER) and moved to their location in Marion, Illinois. It was placed into service on May 29, 1973, hauling the railroads first tourist train on the former Illinois Central Railroad trackage. During the winter of 1973 and 1974, crews converted No. 5 from a tank engine to a tender engine, removing the saddle tank and converting Illinois Central auxiliary water tender X5512 (formerly numbered A-512) to a conventional tender with a coal bunker. On October 18, 1977, No. 5 pulled the CO&E's first revenue freight train and with the subsequent profit from revenue freight runs and declining success of tourist trips, the CO&E discontinued all passenger trains in 1979, with No. 5 being withdrawn from service in October of that same year; it was replaced by Crab Orchard and Egyptian 17.

=== St. Louis, Iron Mountain and Southern Railway ===
In 1985, Shelby Brown approached the COER and offered to purchase No. 5 for the Southeast Missouri Steam Locomotive Association. The offer was accepted, and No. 5 was moved over the Union Pacific Railroad (UP) mainline to Jackson, Missouri, where a tourist railroad was being developed to operate over former Missouri Pacific Railroad trackage. The engine returned to service in 1986 and began pulling passenger trips on the new tourist railroad, now dubbed the St. Louis, Iron Mountain and Southern Railway, between Jackson, Gordonville, Dutchtown, and Delta.

In the mid-late 1990's, the FRA enforced new rules and regulations in steam locomotive operation and maintenance, and several operational steam engines at the time had to be inspected. After a final run in 1999, No. 5 underwent an FRA inspection but failed after it was found to have damaged flues. The engine had to undergo a complete overhaul, which would include numerous parts being replaced with newer identical ones in order to run again. It was estimated to cost $150,000 to complete the work, and the StLIM&S did not have the needed funds. They began a fundraising campaign to raise enough money to begin the overhaul but the cost soon rose to $200,000, which caused No. 5's overhaul to be cancelled. The engine's parts would be scattered around the Jackson, Missouri depot for the next 20 years.

"The public has amnesia. When No. 5 was shoved to the rear and put out of the spotlight, a lot of people in town forgot that we even had a steam engine."

— Billy Mikoliza

In 2019, steam locomotive enthusiasts in Southeastern Missouri and Southern Illinois, began to formulate plans and applications to return No. 5 to operational status. Two years later, in January 2021, it was announced that the team would raise funds to reassemble No. 5 with new components for a return to service. The team began to research historical records and evaluate expenses, and they consulted the National Museum of Transportation (TNMOT) in St. Louis for information on the construction of engines similar to No. 5. They also began to formulate plans to restore the trackage that lies between Jackson and Gordonville.
