= Roberval and Saguenay Railway =

Mining railway in Canada

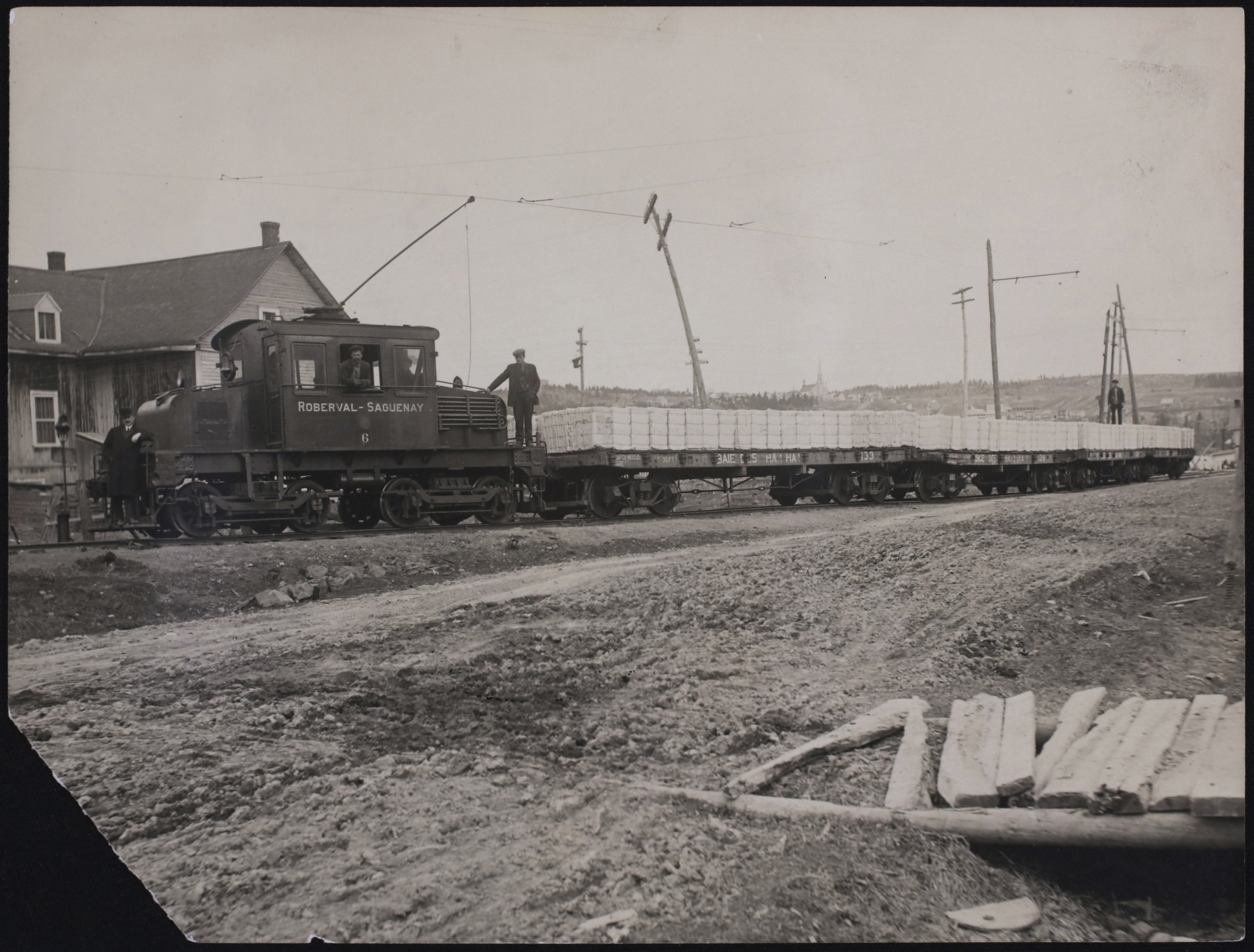

Overview
- Headquarters: Saguenay, Quebec
- Reporting mark: RS
- Locale: Saguenay–Lac-Saint-Jean
- Dates of operation: 1911–present

Technical
- Track gauge: 4 ft 8 1/2 in (1,435 mm) standard gauge
- Length: 100 mi (160 km)

The Roberval and Saguenay Railway (reporting mark RS) is a small railway company located in Saguenay–Lac-Saint-Jean, wholly owned by Rio Tinto Alcan, a mining corporation.

== History ==
The Roberval and Saguenay Railway was incorporation in 1911.

It carries raw ore materials in portions of northern Quebec in eastern Canada.

The railroad runs 100 miles (160 km) of track in total, it also reaches Saguenay, Hébertville and Alma and connects to the Canadian National Railway.

The railroad has a total of four operable diesel locomotives on their roster, EMD SD40-2 (ONT 1735), EMD SD40-3 (BLE 908), and two EMD GP38-2s (GMTX 2139, PRLX 2244).

The railroad also originally owned two 2-8-0 type steam locomotives, Nos. 16 and 17, built in 1937 and 1940 by the Canadian Locomotive Company. They both worked thirty years for the RS hauling ore materials trains until the early 1960s; in 1971, No. 17 was sold to John Thompson and later to the Crab Orchard and Egyptian Railway (CO&E) in Marion, Illinois. As of 2026, No. 17 is now on display at U.S. Highway 30 of South Story Street in Boone, Iowa.
