= Crab Orchard and Egyptian Railway =

Shortline railroad in Illinois

Coordinates: 37.73399°N 88.92833°W

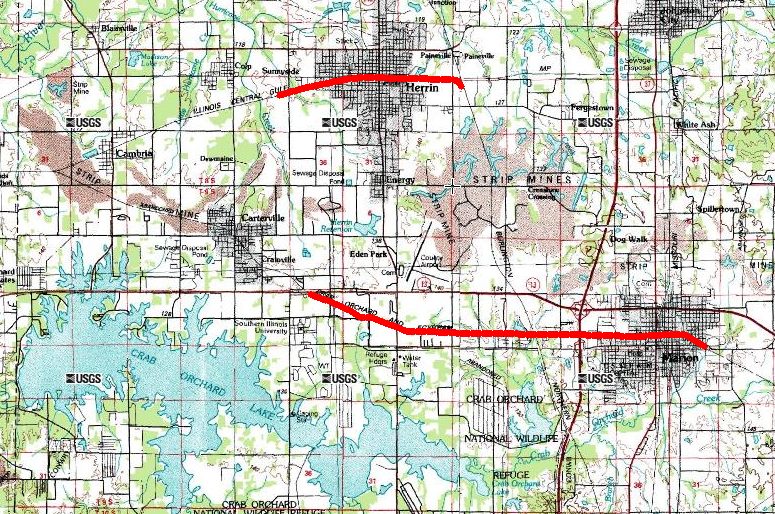
- CO&E Railroad System Map ("Herrin District" above, "Marion District" below)

Overview
- Headquarters: Marion, Illinois
- Reporting mark: COER
- Locale: Southern Illinois
- Dates of operation: 1973–present

Technical
- Track gauge: 4 ft 8 1/2 in (1,435 mm) standard gauge
- Length: 8.5 mi (13.7 km) Marion District; 5 mi (8.0 km) Herrin District; 13.5 mi (21.7 km) Total

Other
- Website: www.progressiverail.com/rrcoer/coer.html

The Crab Orchard and Egyptian Railway (reporting mark COER) (formerly American Rail Heritage, Ltd. d/b/a Crab Orchard, and Egyptian Railroad Company) is a Class III common carrier shortline railroad that operates in the cities of Marion and Herrin in the Southern Illinois region. It is most historically recognized by the FRA for being the last U.S. railroad of any kind to use steam locomotives exclusively in regular revenue freight service up until March 1986.

== Overview ==
The present-day shortline currently operates a total of 13.5 miles (21.7 km) of track across the industrial centers of Williamson County in two separate railroad districts with a fleet of two diesel switcher engines. One line is known as the "Marion District", which is the railroad's main working division with roughly 8.5 miles (13.7 km) of the track; and the other division is the "Herrin District", which mostly serves the city's manufacturing industries along a 5-mile (8.0 km) stretch of track.

It also has three different interchange points with two Class I railroads. Near their main offices in downtown Marion, the railroad has a junction with Union Pacific's Marion Subdivision; another interchange is located in the nearby Marion suburb of Bainbridge with BNSF Railway's Beardstown Subdivision. A second BNSF connection with the same line is also present in the Herrin district. Most of the CO&E Railroad's revenue freight products primarily consist of coal, lumber, petroleum, grain, steel, paper, chemicals, manufactured goods, and railcar repair service.

== History ==
=== Background: 1970s ===
On July 2, 1971, the Crab Orchard & Egyptian railroad was first founded and incorporated under the name of American Rail Heritage Ltd. and the new company started off by creating a vintage tourist line operation alongside Illinois Central Gulf owned trackage. With the first revenue operations commencing on May 29, 1973, the railroad ran its first train consisting of CO&E's newly acquired 2-4-2T No. 5 and three former Illinois Central Railroad commuter cars from the former IC passenger station on Market Street in downtown Marion with several sightseers in the haul. Their tourist runs would go west towards the old Crab Orchard Refuge railroad junction near Ordill where the train would do a brief turn-around and eventually make a return trip back to the passenger depot.

Locomotive No. 5 was rebuilt after its first season in service. The saddle tank and coal bunker were removed and a tender purchased from the Illinois Central Gulf in nearby Carbondale, Illinois, was added in its place. The rebuild resulted in a locomotive that looked more at home pulling the passenger trains, and also gave No. 5 additional fuel and water capacity.

About two years later, a second and much larger steam engine was purchased from John Thompson of Chicago, Illinois. The locomotive was in storage in the Central Vermont Railway roundhouse in New London, Connecticut and was moved to Marion in early 1975 to further complement the CO&E Railroad's historic roster. This new Canadian-built locomotive was former Roberval and Saguenay 2-8-0 No. 17, although since it was not in operable condition, the new engine could not be used in immediate service until an overhaul was performed. Despite a promising bright future, a tragic turnaround occurred on June 13, 1977, when the CO&E's first major incident took place as a fire suddenly broke out inside the old Illinois Central depot. The building was completely gutted, leaving building little more than an empty brick shell. The fire destroyed the railroad's main offices, which were located inside the depot, and two of the CO&E's six passenger cars used in its tourist operation; this huge loss permanently affected future tourist services and would eventually be abolished indefinitely a year later by October 1978.

All was not necessarily lost after this incident when only four months later, the Illinois Central Gulf sold the CO&E Railroad its trackage and property altogether after they discontinued freight service along the entire route. With this new advantage in hand, the railroad's first common carrier freight services would commence soon afterward and the first revenue train was pulled behind 2-4-2 No. 5 on October 18, 1977. These changes in operation immediately took off successfully as freight customers started growing rapidly with CO&E's new locally owned and operated service. Piggyback service was also eventually added in December 1978 when a large fleet of more than 200 new flatcars and 600 highway trailers painted for the CO&E Railroad were delivered. A new engine was acquired at the same time to help switch cars around when a small Davenport 35-Ton switcher arrived on the property in 1978. Not long afterward, the first test run of the 2-8-0 steamer finally occurred on May 10, 1979 after an extensive four-year overhaul and quickly became the primary power of choice by July.

=== Last American steam railroad: 1980s ===
As the next decade started for the Crab Orchard & Egyptian railroad, steam-powered freight service was still expanding and the railroad purchased several different freight cars of its own over the next few years; many of these included coal hoppers, covered hoppers and 25 former Ahnapee & Western boxcars, all of which were lettered for the CO&E with their classic pyramid logo.

By the mid-decade in April 1985, the St. Louis, Iron Mountain and Southern Railway in Jackson, Missouri made a deal to purchase the CO&E's 2-4-2T No. 5 steamer for use on their scenic tourist trains and the locomotive was eventually retired from revenue service soon afterward to be sent to its new owner. A year later, the CO&E leased their first diesel-powered switchers from Precision National in August 1986, which were two former Missouri Pacific Railroad SW1200s Nos. 1147 and 1136. No. 1147 arrived on the property on September 4, 1986, while No. 1136 followed the next day. The arrival of the diesel proved to be fortuitous.

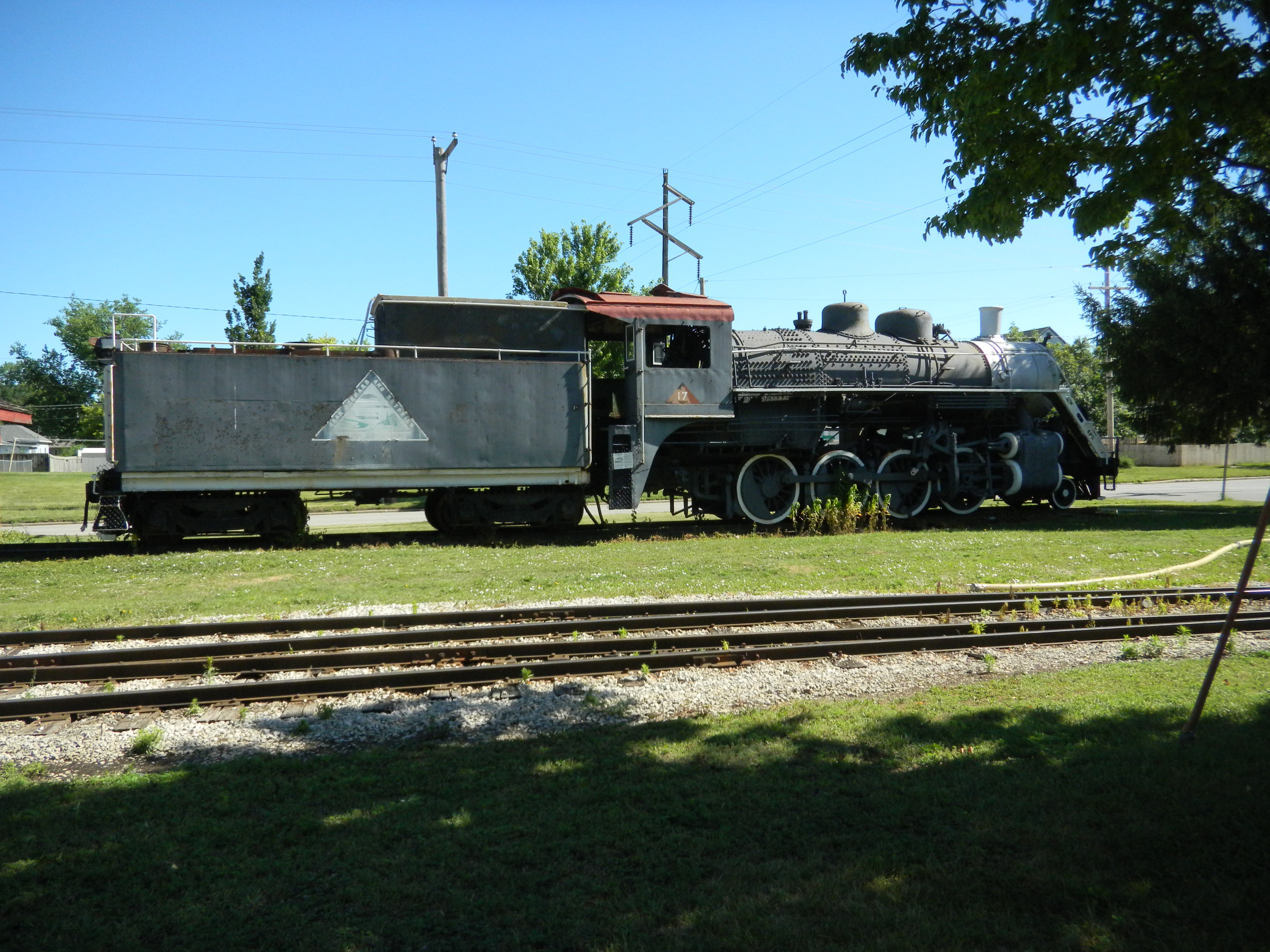
No. 17, the CO&E's primary steam locomotive used in regular freight service, sitting on static display at the Boone and Scenic Valley Railroad in Boone, Iowa, June 21, 2012

On the afternoon of September 8, 1986, the No. 17 was out switching coal hoppers when the dry-pipe inside the boiler suddenly collapsed and indefinitely put the engine out of service unless another major overhaul could be performed on it. The CO&E Railroad's fame of pulling common carrier freight trains, including intermodal piggyback cars, with a steam locomotive, finally came to an abrupt end due to this incident. The incident also marked the end of an era for American-wide railroading in general.

As it was, the railroad had been preparing for the post-steam era. The arrival of the diesel was evidence of this. No. 17 had been in service for seven years and was approaching a federally mandated overhaul. The major work that would have been required was the replacement of the tubes and flues running from the firebox to the smokebox in the boiler. The withdrawal from service of No. 17 for the required overhaul would have marked the end of her career, as there was no plan to overhaul No. 17 when its flue time ran out.

Since it was no longer in operating condition, the No. 17 was eventually sold on February 9, 1987 and later transferred to the Boone and Scenic Valley Railroad (BSVY) of Boone, Iowa. The BSVY hoped to use No. 17 for their tourist operations, but the locomotive's mechanical problems were deemed too extensive and costly for them, and it was subsequently put on static display, instead. The CO&E's roster became fully dieselized, with both of their remaining GM-EMD SW1200s and gasoline-powered Davenport 35-ton switcher. A third former Missouri Pacific SW1200, No. 1161 was eventually purchased and joined the roster in the spring of 1987. Before arrival, it was given a full coat of paint that matched Marion's local high school colors of blue and yellow; however, the No. 1147 was never painted into the railroad's scheme and was only given a patch job with their pyramid logo.

During the fall of the next year, a new line was purchased directly from the Illinois Central Gulf on September 11, 1987 in the nearby city of Herrin. This new addition expanded the CO&E's current system by 5 miles (8.0 km) and gave them access to Herrin's lucrative manufacturing industry such as Maytag Inc. No. 1136 and was fully painted to match Herrin's local high school colors of orange and black.

=== Current day: 1990s - Present ===
While the modern-day Crab Orchard & Egyptian Railroad has been operating common carrier services across Williamson County since the 1970s, the 1980s did see a big difference in the way things were done with the railroad. Intermodal piggyback service started winding down in 1982 and was eventually phased out four years later due to deregulation within the railroad industry. The CO&E's entire roster of freight cars was also sold off early in the decade with the growing popularity of independently and privately owned freight car shippers, many of such were sold to other shortlines for leasing purposes.

In 1995, the railroad's small, but longest-lasting, "Rosi-Clare" Davenport 35-tonner was finally retired from the roster after nearly 20 years of service with the CO&E Railroad. It was later donated to the American Fluorite Museum in the engine's namesake town of Rosiclare, Illinois the same year where it currently resides in full CO&E paint and lettering for display purposes. With Rosi-Clare's departure, a new EMD SW1 switcher would later be purchased from the former Sahara Coal Company as a replacement. It was repainted into the CO&E Railroad's "Marion District" colors of blue and yellow and given the new name and number of "The Six" on the cab side. During July 2006, The Six was eventually given the formal name of William "Bill" E. Schreiber in devotion to one of the CO&E's original founders who had recently died in 2006.

The current traffic base for the CO&E Railroad consists of more than 10 different industrial areas with rail access, all of which ship various commodities on both lines. In the Marion District, there is Warren Oil (liquids and lubricants), Perma-Treat (treated lumber), North Side Wholesale, Illinois Transload, and P&S Grain. Some of its largest customers here are Southern Illinois Railcar, which provides freight-car repair services, Hastie Mining, and Excel Mining, which ships equipment and supplies used in mining applications, and General Dynamics, a government contractor who makes ammunition for the military.

Inside the railroad's Herrin District, there is the CO&E's largest customer, Whirlpool-Maytag's appliance factory, Stone Container (a cardboard box plant), DJM Oil (fuels and lubricants), and East Side Wholesale. Many of these plants have closed down over time within the past few years though, such as the case with Whirlpool shutting down their factory in December 2006 and DJM Oil burning down to the ground in 2007.

== Sale and name change ==
In late 2012, American Rail Heritage, Ltd. sold the railroad to Progressive Rail Incorporated, with December 19, 2012, being the final day of operations for the old company. The railroad is now known as Crab Orchard & Egyptian Railway, a Division of Progressive Rail Incorporated.

== Equipment ==
=== Current active roster ===
Over its three-decade history, the Crab Orchard and Egyptian's locomotive roster has seen a large transition between steam power back in the 1970s and the present-day diesel power currently running; overall they have owned a total of seven different engines from four different locomotive builders over the course of its time. The modern roster comprises only two EMD SW1200's, all of which are fully painted into CO&E's present scheme; however, their individual colors correspond to their own district's local high school colors.

=== Past historic roster ===
One of the railroad's former steam engines, 2-8-0 No. 17, is most widely known for holding the historic title as the last operating common carrier steam locomotive in America. In July 2020, it received a cosmetic restoration and is now on static display by U.S. Highway 30 and South Story Street of Boone, Iowa. The railroad's other steam engine, 2-4-2T No. 5, is currently in storage at the St. Louis, Iron Mountain and Southern Railway in Jackson, Missouri and pending further restoration.

As for the CO&E Railroad's first diesel switcher, SW1200 No. 1147, it only spent three years on the shortline before it was returned to Precision National in 1989 after originally being acquired in August 1986. This company would later sell the engine to the Alcoa Terminal Railroad near Knoxville, Tennessee the same year where it currently remains and works today.

== See also ==
- List of Illinois railroads
- List of heritage railroads in the United States
- Northwestern Steel and Wire

== Sources ==
- Boyd, Jim (May 1987). "End of the Steam Era". Railfan & Railroad. Vol. 6, no. 9. Carstens Publications. pp. 26–27.
- A. Lewis, Edward (1996). American Shortline Railway Guide (5th ed.). Waukesha, WI: Kalmbach Publishing Co. ISBN 0-89024-290-9.
- W. Kerr, James (2006). The Official Locomotive Roster & News Edition 2006 (5th ed.). St. David's, ON: DPA-LTA Enterprises Inc. ISBN 0-919295-43-6.
- Railroad Fallen Flags CO&E historical account, including a few photographs.
- Greg's Steam & Diesel Gallery Photograph & brief information about CO&E's last steam engine.
- Carr Tracks – Steam Engine #17 Short details of the #17 in piggyback service, along with CO&E's logo.
- Union Pacific Railroad Crab Orchard & Egyptian Customer Profile
