= Boone and Scenic Valley Railroad =

Heritage railroad operating in Iowa, US

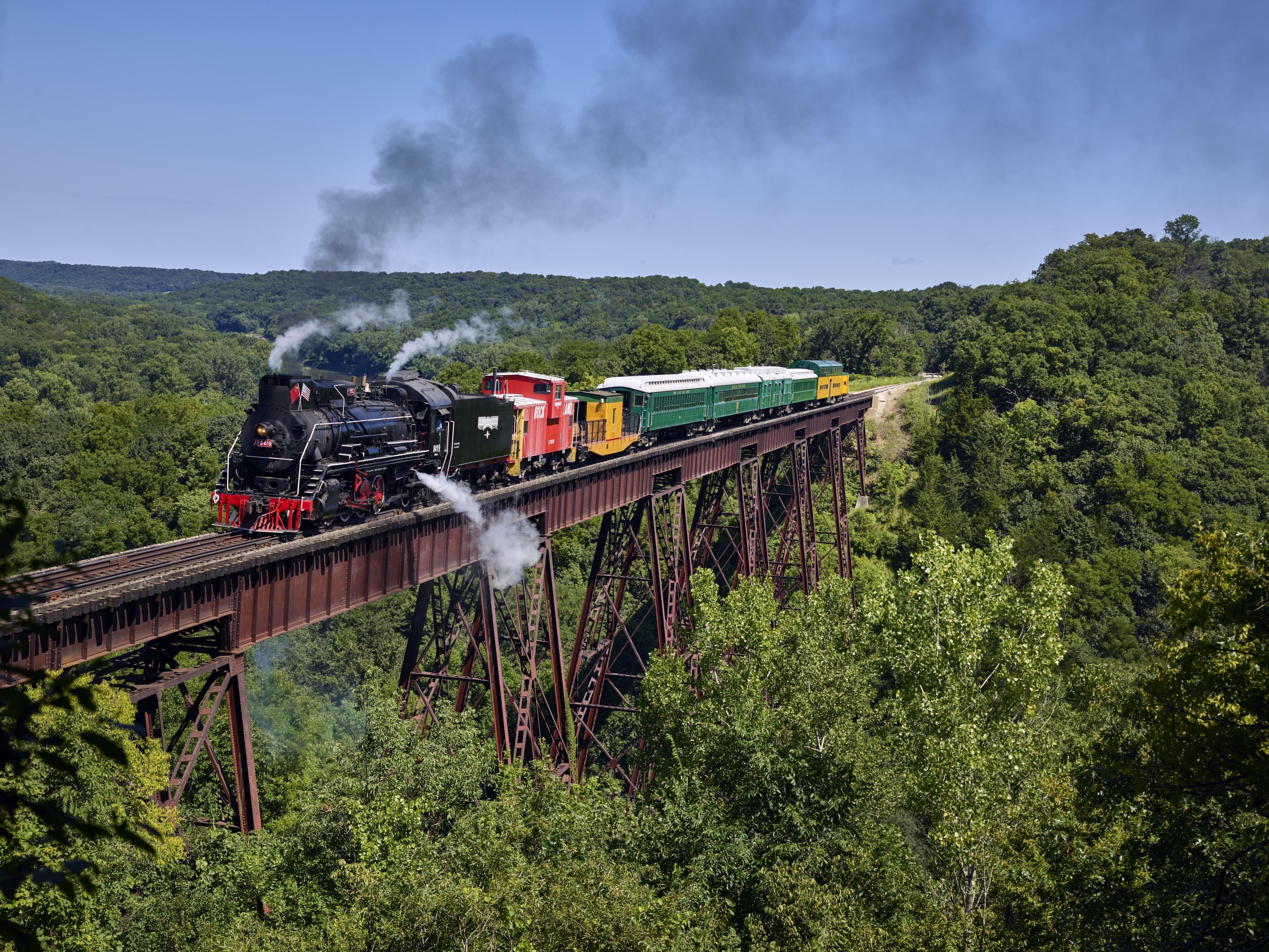
- No. 8419 crosses the Bass Point Creek High Bridge

Overview
- Headquarters: Boone, Iowa
- Reporting mark: BSVY
- Locale: Boone County, Iowa
- Dates of operation: 1983–present
- Predecessor: Fort Dodge, Des Moines and Southern Railroad

Technical
- Track gauge: 4 ft 8 1/2 in (1,435 mm) standard gauge
- Electrification: Yes
- Length: 11 mi (18 km)

Other
- Website: bsvrr.com/wp/

The Boone and Scenic Valley Railroad (reporting mark BSVY) is a shortline and heritage railroad that operates both freight and passenger excursions in Boone County, Iowa.

== History ==
=== Pre-BSVY years ===
The earliest origins of the BSVY trace back to 1893, when the Boone Valley Coal and Railroad Company—founded by businessman Hamilton Browne and headquartered in Boone—constructed a 3-mile (4.8 km) spur to mine and ship coal between Fraser and Fraser Junction, Iowa, where they connected with the Minneapolis and St. Louis Railway. In 1902, the company was restructured as the Newton and North Western Railroad (N&NW) with a goal to expand their operations throughout Iowa, extending southward into Des Moines and Newton, expanding westward past Rockwell City and into the Dakotas, and connecting with other major railroads.

In January 1904, the N&NW completed their southern extension to Boone, where they connected with the Chicago and North Western Railway's (C&NW) former Cedar Rapids and Missouri River line. A brief dispute over the Boone extension occurred: the N&NW initially laid rails on C&NW property, which in turn ordered for them to be ripped up, and then they were re-laid after Browne secured permission to use the property.

Later that same year, Browne was forced to resign from the railroad, as it underwent a takeover by Boston-based capital firms H. T. Loring and Son and H. V. and H. W. Poor Co.. In 1909, the N&NW was acquired by the Fort Dodge, Des Moines and Southern Railroad (FDDMS), which electrified the line for interurban service and expanded their freight operations, and they would later ship gypsum along the route. In 1912, the FDDMS' Des Moines River trestle near Fraser was collapsed from flooding, and a steel bridge was quickly built in its place. The wooden Bass Point Creek High Bridge was likewise replaced with a steel structure within 70 days.

In 1954, a Fraser power plant that provided electricity for the FDDMS was forced into closure by another major flood, and the following year, the FDDMS was dieselized with GE 70-ton switchers, and all their remaining passenger operations were discontinued. Also in 1954, the FDDMS fell under ownership of the Des Moines and Central Iowa (D&CI), owned by scrap dealer and shortline operator Murray Salzberg. In 1968, the D&CI and FDDMS were acquired and absorbed by the Chicago and North Western, which subsequently filed multiple petitions to abandon the trackage.

=== Formation and operations ===
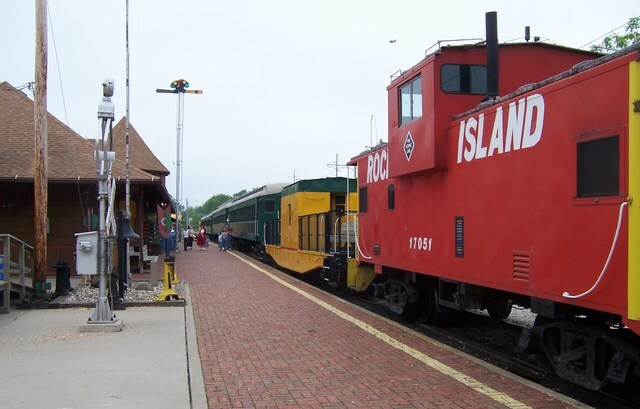
The BSVY depot and passenger train in May 2004

In 1982, a group called the Save the Tracks fund was founded by local jeweler George Eckstein and bank officer Aaron Keller, who attended the abandonment hearings and offered to purchase 20 miles (32 km) of the line to prevent it from being ripped up. The Save the Tracks fund attracted 50 additional members, and petitions and negotiations lasted until June 1983, when the C&NW offered a 12-mile (19 km) section between Boone and Fraser Junction for $50,000 salvage value. The purchase was quickly made after 2,254 donors contributed to the group's funds.

The Save the Tracks fund was reorganized as the Boone Railroad Historical Society, and they chartered the Boone and Scenic Valley Railroad (BSVR), with their inaugural train operating on October 29 of that year. The first locomotive the BSVY used was former U.S. Air Force 80-ton switcher No. 7858, which was renumbered to 2254 in honor of the amount of donors who helped acquire the right-of-way. In the first operating month, the BSVY carried around 3,000 passengers, and within the ensuing months, volunteers began to refurbish 11 miles (18 km) of the line, and the BSVY began to acquire additional locomotives and rolling stock.

The stretch of track winds through the Des Moines River Valley and across their 156-foot (47.5 m) tall bridge spanning Bass Point Creek. The line runs from Boone, through the old coal mining town of Fraser, and ends at the site of the former Fraser Junction at Wolf.

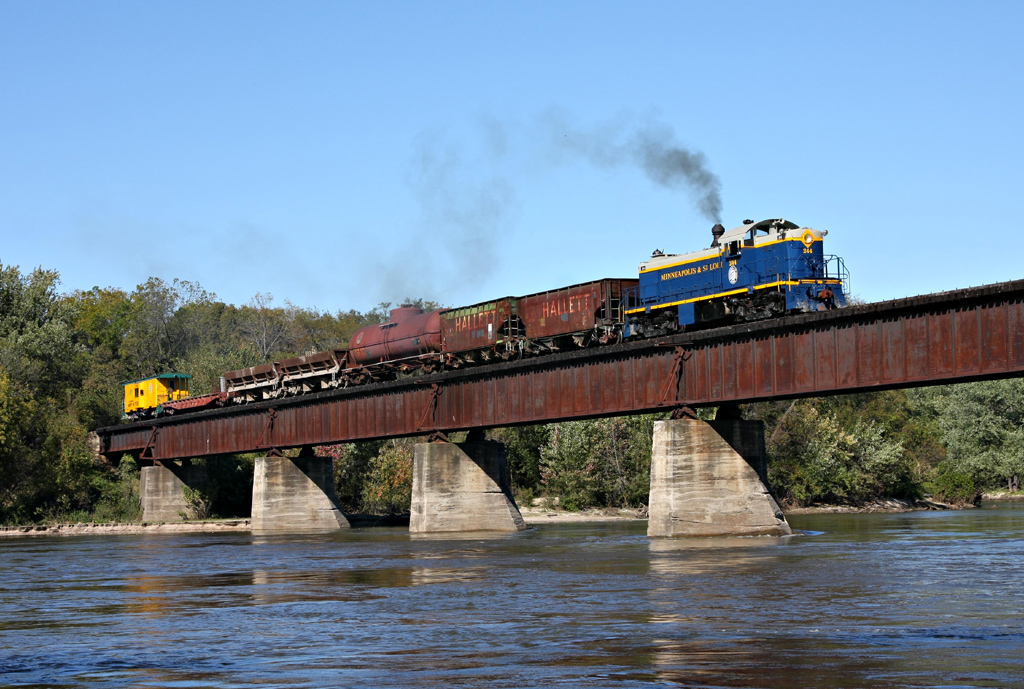
No. 244 hauling a revenue freight train over Des Moines River bridge

In late 1984, the BSVY acquired five interurban cars from the Chicago South Shore and South Bend Railroad for use in their restored electric line within downtown Boone. In 1985, the railroad constructed their own passenger depot in Boone, using an American Railway Association book of depot plans from 1900 as reference. In 1989, the BSVY purchased and imported a Chinese steam locomotive, JS-8419, from the Datong Locomotive Works, and it hauled its first train for the railroad in May 1990, increasing their yearly ridership.

In mid-1993, the BSVY was forced to temporarily suspend their operations amidst that year's Great Flood, which eroded their line between Boone and the Bass Point Creek bridge, and the trackage at Fraser was heavily flooded. After the floods subsided, the railroad resumed that year's operating season with short diesel-powered trains while they reversed the damage to their trackage, and the following year, they restored their normal operating schedule.

In February 2001, the railroad entered freight operations when they acquired 1.66 miles (2.67 km) of the original Fort Dodge, Des Moines and Southern Railroad trackage in the Boone Industrial Park.

Today, more than 30,000 visitors take a ride on one of the regular or special event trains, including the Day Out with Thomas (September), the Pumpkin Express (October), and Santa Express (weekends between Thanksgiving and Christmas) that features a book written and illustrated especially for the trip. Dining cars are reserved for special dinner trains.

The James H. Andrew Railroad Museum and History Center was added to the existing depot and dedicated in 2012. It displays and preserves thousands of Iowa railroad artifacts and memorabilia such as track equipment, toy trains, dining car china, timetables, photos, lanterns, and telegraph equipment. The museum hosts special exhibitions, maintains a research library, and has a small theater/conference room.

== Equipment ==
=== Locomotives ===
Locomotive details
| Number | Image | Type | Model | Built | Builder | Status |
|---|---|---|---|---|---|---|
| 8419 | | Steam | 2-8-2 | 1988 | Datong Locomotive Works | Operational |
| 244 | | Diesel | RS-1 | 1951 | American Locomotive Company | Operational |
| 1003 | | Diesel | NW2 | 1942 | Electro-Motive Diesel | Operational |
| 1098 | | Diesel | S-2 | 1942 | American Locomotive Company | Stored, awaiting repairs |
| 1858 | | Diesel | 45-ton switcher | 1944 | GE Transportation | Operational |
| 2254 | | Diesel | 80-ton switcher | 1942 | GE Transportation | Operational |
| 6540 | | Diesel | FP9A | 1958 | General Motors Diesel | Operational |
| 401 | | Diesel | F7 | 1949 | General Motors Diesel | Stored, awaiting restoration |
| 5202 | | Diesel | NW2 | 1949 | Electro-Motive Diesel | Stored |
| 751 | | Diesel | GP9M | 1949 | Electro-Motive Diesel | Operational |
| 50 | | Trolleycar | Interurban Coach | 1915 | McGuire-Cummings Manufacturing Company | Operational |
| 106 | | Trolleycar | Interurban Coach | 1926 | Pullman Company | Operational |
| 53 | | Electric | 50-ton Freight Motor Car | 1913 | St. Louis Car Company | Under restoration |
| 512 | | Trollycar | Low-floor Car | 1916 | McGuire-Cummings Manufacturing Company | Under restoration |
| 702 | | Electric | 75-ton Steeplecab | 1926 | General Electric | Stored |
| 1103 | | Cow–calf | 65B | 1949 | Electro-Motive Division | Stored, used for parts |
| 1511, 1628 | | Highliner | Bilevel rail car | 1971, 1972 | St. Louis Car Division | Stored |

=== Former units ===
Locomotive details
| Number | Image | Type | Model | Built | Builder | Owner |
|---|---|---|---|---|---|---|
| 17 | | Steam | 2-8-0 | 1940 | Canadian Locomotive Company | Boone Rotary Club |
| 475 | | Steam | 4-8-0 | 1906 | Baldwin Locomotive Works | Strasburg Rail Road |
| 2921 | | Diesel | SD40T-2 | 1979 | Electro-Motive Diesel | Midwest Locomotive Leasing |
| 703 | | Electric | 75-ton Steeplecab | 1926 | General Electric | None (scrapped) |
| 1506, 1523, 1557, 1538, 1551 | | Highliner | Bilevel rail car | 1971, 1972 | St. Louis Car Division | None (scrapped) |
| 408, 409 | | Electric | 125-ton Magna Motors | 1954 | General Electric | None (scrapped) |

=== Rolling stock ===
Rolling stock details
| Number / Name | Image | Type | Built | Builder |
|---|---|---|---|---|
| 4810 (City of Los Angeles) | | Dining car | Unknown | Unknown |
| 9044 (City of San Francisco) | | Dining car | Unknown | Unknown |
| 96 | | Bi-Level coach | Unknown | Unknown |
| 3203, 3207, 3208, 3213, 3218, 3238, 9101 | | Coaches | 1925 | Pullman Company |
| 2584 | | Coach | 1928 | Unknown |
| 12517 (Valley View) | | Open-air car | Unknown | Unknown |
| 17051 | | Caboose | Unknown | Unknown |
| 11136 | | Caboose | Unknown | Unknown |
| 285 | | Tanker car | Unknown | Unknown |

== See also ==
- List of heritage railroads in the United States
