= List of shipwrecks in 1991 =

The list of shipwrecks in 1991 includes ships sunk, foundered, grounded, or otherwise lost during 1991.

table of contents
1991
Jan	Feb	Mar	Apr
May	Jun	Jul	Aug
Sep	Oct	Nov	Dec
Unknown date

== January ==
=== 10 January ===
List of shipwrecks: 10 January 1991
Ship	State	Description
St. Martin	United Kingdom	The 113.58-foot (34.62 m), 254-ton Oil Field Standby (safety) Vessel, a former trawler, collided with a leg of the Jackup rig she was attending and sank in the Southern North Sea in just six minutes. All hands were safely rescued.

=== 13 January ===
List of shipwrecks: 13 January 1991
Ship	State	Description
Protektor	Singapore	The bulk carrier sank in heavy weather in the North Atlantic with the loss of all 33 crew.

=== 16 January ===
List of shipwrecks: 16 January 1991
Ship	State	Description
Continental Lotus	India	The bulk carrier/cargo ship sank 160 nautical miles (300 km) east of Malta en route from Mormugao to Genova after developing crack in engine room bulkhead with the loss of 38 out of 42 crew

=== 23 January ===
List of shipwrecks: 23 January 1991
Ship	State	Description
RMAS Colonel Templer		The 56.55-metre (185.5 ft), 952-ton acoustic research/survey vessel, a former trawler, caught fire during conversion work for her new owner, the Defence Evaluation and Research Agency at Hull, England. She flooded and capsized at dock. She was righted, salvaged, repaired and returned to service.

=== 23 January ===
List of shipwrecks: 23 January 1991
Ship	State	Description
Amuriyah	Iraq	First Gulf War, Operation Desert Storm: The tanker was attacked and severely damaged off Bubiyan island by Grumman A-6 Intruder aircraft from USS Midway (United States Navy). She subsequently sank. The wreck was scheduled to be removed in or after 2014.

=== 24 January ===
List of shipwrecks: 24 January 1991
Ship	State	Description
Unidentified minelayer	Iraqi Navy	First Gulf War, Operation Desert Storm: Battle of Qurah: The minelayer was sunk by two United States Grumman A-6 Intruder aircraft.
Unidentified minesweeper	Iraqi Navy	First Gulf War, Operation Desert Storm: Battle of Qurah: The minesweeper was sunk by two United States Grumman A-6 Intruder aircraft.
Unidentified minesweeper	Iraqi Navy	First Gulf War, Operation Desert Storm: Battle of Qurah: The minesweeper was sunk in an Iraqi minefield while trying to evade United States Grumman A-6 Intruder aircraft. Helicopters from the guided-missile frigate USS Curts (United States Navy) rescued 22 crewmen, who were made prisoners of war.
Unidentified patrol boat	Iraqi Navy	First Gulf War, Operation Desert Storm: Battle of Qurah: The patrol boat was sunk by two United States Grumman A-6 Intruder aircraft.

=== 29 January ===
List of shipwrecks: 29 January 1991
Ship	State	Description
Unidentified minesweeper	Iraqi Navy	First Gulf War, Operation Desert Storm: Battle of Umm al Maradim: The Project 1258 minesweeper was sunk by coalition aircraft or surface ships.

== February ==
=== 8 February ===
List of shipwrecks: 8 February 1991
Ship	State	Description
Skagit Eagle	United States	The 91-foot (28 m) fishing vessel was wrecked in Reese Bay (54°00′15″N 164°43′00″W) on Unalaska Island in the Aleutian Islands. All five members of her crew survived and a United States Coast Guard helicopter picked them up from the shore.

=== 10 February ===
List of shipwrecks: 10 February 1991
Ship	State	Description
Ashley Kay	United States	The 32-foot (9.8 m) crab-fishing vessel struck a rock and sank in Frederick Sound in the Alexander Archipelago in Southeast Alaska.
Barbarossa	United States	The 195-gross ton, 81.6-foot (24.9 m) or 98-foot (29.9 m) crab-fishing vessel disappeared in the Bering Sea near St. George Island with the loss of all five men on board. The United States Coast Guard determined that a radio message from an unnamed vessel reporting herself in distress about 40 nautical miles (74 km; 46 mi) west of St. George Island came from Barbarossa.

=== 14 February ===
List of shipwrecks: 14 February 1991
Ship	State	Description
Louisiana Brimstone	United States	The molten sulphur carrier ran aground at Coatzacoalcos, Mexico. She was refloated but consequently withdrawn from service. Scrapped in 1993.
Sanko Harvest	Panama	The bulk carrier ran aground between Hastings Island and Hood Island, Australia. Her twenty crew were evacuated on 15 February. She broke in three and sank on 17 February. Sanko Harvest was on a voyage from Tampa, Florida, United States to Esperance, Western Australia.
Thunderbird	United States	The 35-foot (11 m) longline fishing vessel sank in Chatham Strait in the Alexander Archipelago in Southeast Alaska. Only one of the two people on board survived.
Vikingo	Spain	The 116.4-foot (35.5 m), 249-ton fishing vessel sank in the Bay of Biscay after springing a leak in the North Atlantic.

=== 15 February ===
List of shipwrecks: 15 February 1991
Ship	State	Description
Unidentified patrol boat	Spanish Navy	A P-205 Type patrol boat was destroyed by a bomb planted by ETA at Hondarribia.

=== 24 February ===
List of shipwrecks: 24 February 1991
Ship	State	Description
Breydon Merchant	United Kingdom	The 425-ton coaster ship caught fire in the English Channel while carrying 120 tons of explosives for an Irish company. Towed to Gravesend on 25 February, she was later declared a total loss and scrapped; her crew of four was rescued by a Royal Air Force Westland Sea King helicopter. Broken up at Rainham in June 1991.

== March ==
=== 28 March ===
List of shipwrecks: 28 March 1991
Ship	State	Description
Noordborg	Netherlands	The coastal trading vessel ran aground at Wells-next-the-Sea. Refloated somewhere before 4 October 1991 as a total constructive loss.

== April ==
=== 4 April ===
List of shipwrecks: 4 April 1991
Ship	State	Description
Starling	United States	The fishing vessel sprang a leak due to the deterioration of her wooden hull and sank while moored to a barge in the Gastineau Channel in Southeast Alaska.

=== 7 April ===
List of shipwrecks: 7 April 1991
Ship	State	Description
Choctaw	United States	The retired 90-foot (27.4 m) tug was scuttled as an artificial reef in the North Atlantic Ocean 6.5 nautical miles (12.0 km; 7.5 mi) off Harvey Cedars, New Jersey, in 75 feet (23 m) of water at 39°37.894′N 074°01.284′W.

=== 8 April ===
List of shipwrecks: 8 April 1991
Ship	State	Description
Starfish	Panama	The bulk carrier sprang a leak in the Indian Ocean off Port Louis, Mauritius on 1 April and diverted to that port. She arrived off Port Louis on 3 April and was subsequently ordered out of Mauritian waters on 7 April due to the threat of pollution. Starfish foundered 40 nautical miles (74 km) west of Mauritius and 60 nautical miles (110 km) north of Réunion on 8 April. All crew were rescued by a National Coast Guard of Mauritius patrol boat.

=== 10 April ===
List of shipwrecks: 10 April 1991
Ship	State	Description
Agip Abruzzo; Moby Prince	Italy	Moby Prince disaster: The ferry Moby Prince collided with the tanker Agip Abruzzo off Livorno, Tuscany. Both ships caught fire, leading to the deaths of 140. Both ships were declared total losses.

=== 11 April ===
List of shipwrecks: 11 April 1991
Ship	State	Description
Haven	Cyprus	The very large crude carrier suffered an explosion and fire at Genoa, Liguria, Italy with the loss of six crew. She sank on 14 April.
Talia	United States	Carrying a heavy load of herring, the 58-foot (18 m) herring-fishing vessel sank in rough seas off Point Gardner (57°01′N 134°37′W) in Southeast Alaska.
Venus	United States	The 44-foot (13.4 m) longline fishing vessel sank in a storm with 100-knot (190 km/h; 120 mph) winds off Katlian Bay (57°09′N 135°23′W) north of Sitka, Alaska.

=== 17 April ===
List of shipwrecks: 17 April 1991
Ship	State	Description
Mineral Diamond	Hong Kong	The bulk carrier foundered in the Indian Ocean 1,500 nautical miles (2,800 km) west of Perth, Western Australia with the loss of all 26 crew.

=== 28 April ===
List of shipwrecks: 28 April 1991
Ship	State	Description
Berta J	United States	The 38-foot (11.6 m) longline fishing vessel sank in south of Yakutat, Alaska, with the loss of two crewmen, leaving behind little evidence of her loss.

=== 29 April ===
List of shipwrecks: 29 April 1991
Ship	State	Description
SAS President Steyn	South African Navy	The decommissioned President-class Type 12 frigate was sunk as a target by a combination of missile hits and gunfire from five Minister-class fast attack craft (all South African Navy) off South Africa.

== May ==
=== 9 May ===
List of shipwrecks: 9 May 1991
Ship	State	Description
Dora H	United States	The 53-foot (16.2 m) halibut longliner sank in the Gulf of Alaska off Chirikof Island. Her crew of four abandoned ship in a life raft and survived.

=== 14 May ===
List of shipwrecks: 14 May 1991
Ship	State	Description
Max	United States	The 91-foot (27.7 m) longline fishing vessel capsized and sank near Hinchinbrook Entrance (60°20′N 146°50′W) in Prince William Sound on the south-central coast of Alaska. Her crew of four survived.

=== 25 May ===
List of shipwrecks: 25 May 1991
Ship	State	Description
A-502	Ethiopian Navy	Eritrean War of Independence: The tanker was scuttled in the Dahlak Archipelago.
Denden	Ethiopian Navy	Eritrean War of Independence: The cargo ship was scuttled in the Dahlak Archipelago.
FMB-160	Ethiopian Navy	Eritrean War of Independence: The Project 205EP missile boat was scuttled in the Dahlak Archipelago.
FMB-162	Ethiopian Navy	Eritrean War of Independence: The Project 205EP missile boat was scuttled in the Dahlak Archipelago.
FTB-110	Ethiopian Navy	Eritrean War of Independence: The Project 205ET patrol ship was scuttled in the Dahlak Archipelago.
LTC-1036	Ethiopian Navy	Eritrean War of Independence: The landing ship was scuttled in the Dahlak Archipelago.
Two unidentified landing ships	Ethiopian Navy	Eritrean War of Independence: The Project 1785 landing ships were scuttled in the Dahlak Archipelago.

=== 28 May ===
List of shipwrecks: 28 May 1991
Ship	State	Description
ABT Summer	Liberia	The tanker exploded and caught fire 900 nautical miles (1,700 km) off the coast of Angola with the loss of five of her 32 crew. She was on a voyage from Kharg Island, Iran to Rotterdam, South Holland, Netherlands. ABT Summer sank on 1 June.
Almighty	United States	The 144-ton, 85-foot (25.9 m) fishing trawler struck a submerged object and sank off the coast of Alaska in Bristol Bay about 2 nautical miles (3.7 km; 2.3 mi) off Right Hand Point (58°46′10″N 159°54′00″W) and 7 nautical miles (13 km; 8.1 mi) north of Round Island in the Walrus Islands. Another fishing vessel rescued her entire crew of five. She eventually was salvaged.

=== 30 May ===
List of shipwrecks: 30 May 1991
Ship	State	Description
Wanderer	United States	The 34-foot (10 m) longline fishing vessel sank while at anchor in Stephens Passage in the Alexander Archipelago near Juneau, Alaska.

=== Unknown date ===
List of shipwrecks: unknown May 1991
Ship	State	Description
F-1616 Zerai Deres	Ethiopian Navy	Eritrean War of Independence: The previously damaged beyond repair Project 159 frigate was scuttled in the Dahlak Archipelago.
FTB-112	Ethiopian Navy	Eritrean War of Independence: The Project 206M motor torpedo boat was scuttled in the Dahlak Archipelago.
FTB-113	Ethiopian Navy	Eritrean War of Independence: The Project 206M motor torpedo boat was scuttled in the Dahlak Archipelago.
P-205	Ethiopian Navy	Eritrean War of Independence: The Project 1400ME patrol ship was sunk by Eritrean People's Liberation Front artillery.
P-208	Ethiopian Navy	Eritrean War of Independence: The Project 1400ME patrol ship was sunk by Eritrean People's Liberation Front artillery.
Two unidentified landing ships	Ethiopian Navy	Eritrean War of Independence: The Project 1785 landing ships were sunk by Eritrean People's Liberation Front artillery.
Unidentified landing ship	Ethiopian Navy	Eritrean War of Independence: The Project 1785 landing ship was scuttled in the Dahlak Archipelago.

== June ==
=== 5 June ===
List of shipwrecks: 5 June 1991
Ship	State	Description
Windsong	United States	The 33-foot (10.1 m) fishing vessel went adrift and sank off Cape Spencer, Alaska. Her three-man crew escaped in a life raft and was rescued.

=== 7 June ===
List of shipwrecks: 7 June 1991
Ship	State	Description
Braut Team	Norway	The cargo ship, a 15-year-old vessel, sank in the Indian Ocean, east of Sri Lanka. Water began flooding the cargo holds on 6 June. The ship had been scheduled to make multiple stops along Southern Asia and Europe, before docking at the United States. The cargo included ferrosilicon and a new Chinese steam locomotive bound for the New York, Susquehanna and Western Railway in the United States. All 17 crewmen were rescued.

=== 11 June ===
List of shipwrecks: 11 June 1991
Ship	State	Description
Crusader	United States	The 27-foot (8.2 m) longline fishing vessel sank after she lost steering and ran aground on the Inian Rocks (58°15′N 136°20′W) – in Cross Sound in the Alexander Archipelago in Southeast Alaska.

=== 20 June ===
List of shipwrecks: 20 June 1991
Ship	State	Description
Marcelina de Ciriza	Argentina	A heavy winter storm dislodged the derelict factory ship from its anchorage at Mar del Plata port's north wharf, wrecking it on a beach about 4 nautical miles to the north. The trawler was never recovered.

=== 26 June ===
List of shipwrecks: 26 June 1991
Ship	State	Description
Betty B	United States	The 37-foot (11.3 m) fishing vessel capsized and sank with the loss of two lives in Atka Pass (52°00′N 175°22′W) near Atka Island in the Aleutian Islands after striking a rock. There was one survivor.

== July ==
=== 1 July ===
List of shipwrecks: 1 July 1991
Ship	State	Description
Sea Toad	United States	The 30-foot (9.1 m) fish tender sank in the Yukon River in central Alaska. Only one of the two people on board survived.

=== 7 July ===
List of shipwrecks: 7 July 1991
Ship	State	Description
Manila Transporter	Philippines	The bulk carrier sprang a leak in the Pacific Ocean and was abandoned by her 24 crew at 29°42′S 64°16′E. They were rescued by Berica (Norway). The derelict Manila Transporter was discovered on 27 July at 23°55′S 65°55′E by Algenib (Singapore). She was subsequently taken in tow by the tugs Smit Langkawi and Smit Sulawesi (both flag unknown) but she sank some 700 nautical miles (1,300 km) east of Mauritius on 7 August.

=== 10 July ===
List of shipwrecks: 10 July 1991
Ship	State	Description
Silver Eagle	United States	The 29-foot (8.8 m) fishing vessel sank in Bristol Bay off the coast of Alaska.

=== 14 July ===
List of shipwrecks: 14 July 1991
Ship	State	Description
Charmer	United States	The 34-foot (10.4 m) shrimp trawler sank off Level Island (56°28′N 133°05′W) in Southeast Alaska after her shrimp trawl caught on the bottom and its cable broke, causing her load to shift, which in turn made her capsize. Her crew of two survived.

=== 16 July ===
List of shipwrecks: 16 July 1991
Ship	State	Description
Mary Lou	United States	The 66-foot (20.1 m) fishing vessel ran aground, was refloated, was tied to a buoy, and then sank near Dillingham, Alaska.
Tyee	United States	A large wave struck the stern of the 35-foot (11 m) fishing vessel as she crossed a shoal during a gale, causing her to capsize and sink in Bristol Bay off Port Heiden, Alaska. Both crew members survived; one was rescued by the fishing vessel Isle Royale (United States) and the other by the fishing vessel Shadowfax (United States).

=== 17 July ===
List of shipwrecks: 17 July 1991
Ship	State	Description
Sable	United States	The 82-foot (25 m) fish tender burned to the waterline and sank in Bristol Bay off Alaska. All four members of her crew were rescued.

=== 20 July ===
List of shipwrecks: 20 July 1991
Ship	State	Description
MV Kirki	Greece	The tanker broke in two in the Indian Ocean 22 nautical miles (41 km) off Cervantes, Western Australia during a storm. The bow section sank. The stern section caught fire five times but each time the rough seas put the fire out. Kirki was towed to Dampier, Western Australia, where her remaining cargo was transferred to another ship. She was subsequently towed to Singapore.

=== 25 July ===
List of shipwrecks: 25 July 1991
Ship	State	Description
Becky Lee	United States	The retired 85-foot (25.9 m) fishing trawler was scuttled as an artificial reef in the North Atlantic Ocean off Cape May, New Jersey, in 60 feet (18 m) of water at 38°53.110′N 074°01.030′W.

== August ==
=== 3 August ===
List of shipwrecks: 3 August 1991
Ship	State	Description
Oceanos	Greece	The cruise ship sank in the Indian Ocean off the coast of South Africa (32°02′00″S 29°06′36″E) after a leakage in the engine room's sea chest. The crew abandoned ship, leaving the passengers to their fate. All 571 people on board survived. The passengers were rescued by South African Air Force helicopters.

=== 7 August ===
List of shipwrecks: 7 August 1991
Ship	State	Description
8 Ball	United States	The 26-foot (7.9 m) fishing vessel lost her anchor and was thrown onto the rocks on the coast of Wingham Island (60°01′N 144°23′W) on the south-central coast of Alaska. An attempt to refloat her on 8 August failed, and she sank in 480 feet (150 m) of water.

=== 10 August ===
List of shipwrecks: 10 August 1991
Ship	State	Description
Brandy	United States	The 34-foot (10.4 m) fishing vessel burned and sank at Anchor Point, Alaska.

=== 15 August ===
List of shipwrecks: 15 August 1991
Ship	State	Description
DB-29	Panama	Typhoon Fred: The oil pipeline barge capsized and sank in the South China Sea in 75 mph (121 km/h) winds and waves as high as 60 feet (18 m) about 65 miles (105 km) off Hong Kong. Of approximately 195–200 crew on board, 168 workers were rescued by British and Chinese military helicopters and by ships from Taiwan, China, and the Soviet Union. Sixteen were killed and others were reported missing.

=== 17 August ===
List of shipwrecks: 17 August 1991
Ship	State	Description
Sea Fox	United States	The 48-foot (15 m) fishing vessel rolled onto her side in heavy seas and sank in Knight Island Passage north of Point Nowell (60°26′15″N 147°56′05″W) on the south-central coast of Alaska. Her crew of five survived.

=== 24 August ===
List of shipwrecks: 24 August 1991
Ship	State	Description
Melete	Greece	The bulk carrier foundered in the Indian Ocean (27°41′S 54°13′E) with the loss of 25 of the 27 people on board.

=== Unknown date ===
List of shipwrecks: Unknown date August 1991
Ship	State	Description
Regina Maris	Norway	The schooner was scuttled by her captain at her berth at Greenport, New York, to protect her from damage by Hurricane Bob and to provide protection to historic waterfront buildings. She was refloated after the storm passed.

== September ==
=== 8 September ===
List of shipwrecks: 8 September 1991
Ship	State	Description
Sundancer	United States	The 58-foot (18 m) longline fishing vessel capsized and sank in the Gulf of Alaska 185 nautical miles (343 km; 213 mi) east of Kodiak, Alaska, after a rogue wave struck her. Her entire crew of five survived.

=== 10 September ===
List of shipwrecks: 10 September 1991
Ship	State	Description
Bounty	United Kingdom	The 68-foot (21 m) trawler sprang a leak and sank 60 miles southeast of Sumburgh Head, Shetland. Crew rescued from liferaft by helicopter.
Soon Ly	Honduras	The cargo ship sank off the coast of Vietnam.

=== 11 September ===
List of shipwrecks: 11 September 1991
Ship	State	Description
Klimno	Croatia	Croatian War of Independence: The barge was destroyed by missiles at Novigrad, Croatia. She was raised and scrapped in 1997.

=== 13 September ===
List of shipwrecks: 13 September 1991
Ship	State	Description
Sea Maid	United States	The 36-foot (11 m) troller sank in the Gulf of Alaska off Cape Edgecumbe (56°59′45″N 135°51′00″W) in Southeast Alaska.

=== 14 September ===
List of shipwrecks: 14 September 1991
Ship	State	Description
Let’s Go	United States	The 71-foot (21.6 m) fishing trawler sank off Cape Ommaney (56°10′00″N 134°40′20″W) in Southeast Alaska. Her crew of five was rescued from a life raft.

=== 18 September ===
List of shipwrecks: 11 September 1991
Ship	State	Description
Vukov Klanac	Croatia	Croatian War of Independence: Battle of Šibenik: The minesweeper was damaged beyond repair by Yugoslavian artillery in Šibenik shortly after being taken over by Croatian forces.

=== 20 September ===
List of shipwrecks: 20 September 1991
Ship	State	Description
Cruiser	United States	The 32-foot (9.8 m) longline fishing vessel burned and sank off Marmot Island in the Kodiak Archipelago near Kodiak, Alaska. The only person aboard survived.

=== 23 September ===
List of shipwrecks: 23 September 1991
Ship	State	Description
Nagan	United States	The 40-foot (12.2 m) longline halibut-fishing vessel capsized and sank off the Egg Islands near Cordova, Alaska, with the loss of her two crewmen.

=== 25 September ===
List of shipwrecks: 25 September 1991
Ship	State	Description
BRM-86	Yugoslav Navy	Croatian War of Independence: The armed motorboat hit a mine laid down on 24 September by the ferry Gradac (Croatian Navy) and sunk off Lora while on a resupply mission to the Yugoslav army barracks at Divulje. Three sailors and two soldiers were killed. There were two survivors.

=== 26 September ===
List of shipwrecks: 26 September 1991
Ship	State	Description
Sea Hawk	United States	The 38-foot (11.6 m) salmon seiner went aground and broke up in the surf near Valdez, Alaska, after she lost power due to a clogged fuel filter. Her crew of two survived.

=== 28 September ===
List of shipwrecks: 28 September 1991
Ship	State	Description
Blanco Encalada	Chilean Navy	The decommissioned Fletcher-class destroyer was sunk as a target.
Oman Sea One	Oman	The Omani crab trawler capsized onto her port side at 05:30z and lay semi-submerged for more than a day 183 nautical miles (339 km; 211 mi) off St. Helena Island while returning to the island from fishing trials. Some crew perished including the British skipper and the South African cook.

=== Unknown date ===
List of shipwrecks: September 1991
Ship	State	Description
Krila Dalmacije	Croatia	Croatian War of Independence: The 130-ton hydrofoil was shelled and sunk at Split by Yugoslav Navy warships. Later scrapped.
Krila Istre	Croatia	Croatian War of Independence: The 130-ton hydrofoil was shelled and sunk at Split by Yugoslav Navy warships. Later scrapped.

== October ==
=== 5 October ===
List of shipwrecks: 3 December 1996
Ship	State	Description
Perast	Croatia	Croatian War of Independence: The 335 ton coaster was abandoned after being heavily damaged by naval, artillery and tank fire at Slano, where the vessel had been forced to re-enter when fired at by the patrol boat PČ-178 Kosmaj ( Yugoslav Navy) while steaming away on 1 October. Kosmaj shelled Slano on 5 October, killing three of Perast complement after they landed. Adrift, the ship was towed to Korčula and eventually declared a total constructive loss. Perast was scrapped in 2005.

=== 8 October ===
List of shipwrecks: 3 December 1996
Ship	State	Description
Discovery	United States	The 97-foot (29.6 m) crab-fishing vessel capsized and sank southwest of the Queen Charlotte Islands in British Columbia, Canada. Wearing survival suits, her five crew members survived for 11 days in a life raft before the fishing vessel Ocean Viking (United States) rescued them on 19 October.

=== 11 October ===
List of shipwrecks: 11 October 1991
Ship	State	Description
Ada Adelia	United States	The retired 67-foot (20.4 m) fishing trawler was scuttled as an artificial reef in 85 feet (26 m) of water in the North Atlantic Ocean east of Ocean City, New Jersey, at 39°15.500′N 074°13.880′W.

=== 13 October ===
List of shipwrecks: 13 October 1991
Ship	State	Description
Tonquin	United States	The 86-foot (26.2 m) longline fishing vessel capsized and sank in the Gulf of Alaska off Twoheaded Island (56°54′N 153°35′W) near Kodiak, Alaska. Her captain died, but the other four crewmen were rescued.

=== 22 October ===
List of shipwrecks: 22 October 1991
Ship	State	Description
Emerald Cove	United States	The 31-foot (9.4 m) salmon seiner burned and sank at Cordova, Alaska.

=== 23 October ===
List of shipwrecks: 23 October 1991
Ship	State	Description
Unidentified fishing motorboat	Croatia	Croatian War of Independence: A fishing motorboat carrying six Croatian naval commandos on a sabotage mission was intercepted off Šipan island and sunk after a brief exchange of fire by the patrol boat PČ-178 Kosmaj ( Yugoslav Navy) . Three Argentine volunteers and two Croatian fighters were killed, one survived.

=== 28 October ===
List of shipwrecks: 28 October 1991
Ship	State	Description
Andrea Gail	United States	1991 "Perfect Storm": The fishing vessel sank in the Atlantic Ocean with the loss of all six crew.

=== 31 October ===
List of shipwrecks: 31 October 1991
Ship	State	Description
Rose Ann Hess	United States	The 50-foot (15.2 m) longline fishing vessel was wrecked in bad weather at Port Bailey (57°56′N 153°02′W) on Kodiak Island, Alaska. Her crew of six survived.

== November ==
=== 5 November ===
List of shipwrecks: 5 November 1991
Ship	State	Description
SK Link One	Sweden	The cargo ship suffered a fire in her engine room and was abandoned by her crew in the North Sea off the coast of Cleveland, United Kingdom. She exploded and sank on 10 November.

=== 7 November ===
List of shipwrecks: 7 November 1991
Ship	State	Description
Louise	United States	The 86-foot (26.2 m) fishing vessel sank in bad weather near Dutch Harbor, Alaska, with the loss of one life. There were four survivors.

=== 8 November ===
List of shipwrecks: 8 November 1991
Ship	State	Description
RML-308	Yugoslav Navy	Croatian War of Independence: The RML-301-class river minesweeper was hit by small-arms rounds and anti-tank rockets fired by Croatian forces and beached in the area of Kopački Rit, on the confluence of the Danube and the Drava while intercepting the pusher tug Šariš (Czechoslovakia), which was on a gunrunning mission for Croatia. Later refloated, repaired and returned to service. Two crewmen were killed and the commanding officer wounded.
Šariš	Czechoslovakia	Croatian War of Independence: The pusher tug was hit by gunfire from RML-308 ( Yugoslav Navy) on the confluence of the Danube and the Drava while on a gunrunning mission for Croatia and set on fire. Adrift, she was eventually towed to Bratislava for repairs.

=== 11 November ===
List of shipwrecks: 11 November 1991
Ship	State	Description
Euro River	Malta	Croatian War of Independence: The cargo ship, manned by a Croatian crew and bounded for Dubrovnik, was sunk by gunfire from a Yugoslav navy patrol boat off Šolta island. All members of her complement were rescued safely.

=== 12 November ===
List of shipwrecks: 12 November 1991
Ship	State	Description
Adriatic	Croatia	Croatian War of Independence, Siege of Dubrovnik: The ferry was shelled by Yugoslav navy vessels and ground artillery at Dubrovnik, caught fire and sank at Gruz, Dubrovnik. raised and scrapped in 1994.
Argolys	Croatia	Croatian War of Independence, Siege of Dubrovnik: The ferry was shelled by Yugoslav navy vessels and ground artillery at Dubrovnik, caught fire and sank at Gruz, Dubrovnik. Raised and scrapped.
Pelagic	United States	Croatian War of Independence, Siege of Dubrovnik: The sailing vessel was shelled and sunk by Yugoslav navy vessels and ground artillery at Dubrovnik.

=== 14 November ===
List of shipwrecks: 14 November 1991
Ship	State	Description
Mukos	Yugoslav Navy	Croatian War of Independence, Battle of the Dalmatian channels: The vessel was hit by a midget torpedo launched by Croatian naval commandos, crippled and abandoned by her crew. Survivors were rescued by Pionir II ( Yugoslav Navy). Three crewmen were killed. Towed by local fishing boats to Šolta island and beached, later recovered, repaired and put into service in the Croatian Navy as Šolta.
Rabunion XVIII	Lebanon	The cargo ship collided with Madonna Lily (Philippines) under the Fatih Sultan Mehmet Bridge, Istanbul, Turkey, and sank.
Voroshilovgrad	Soviet Union	Croatian War of Independence, Battle of Vukovar: The pusher tug was hit by artillery fire on the bridge and was heavily damaged while sailing on the Danube near Vukovar. The tow of barges ran aground when the tug lost steering. Two sailors were killed and three other wounded.

=== 16 November ===
List of shipwrecks: 16 November 1991
Ship	State	Description
Iž	Yugoslav Navy	Croatian War of Independence, Battle of the Dalmatian channels: The patrol boat was hit and crippled by coastal batteries manned by Croatian navy personnel and stranded at Torac Bay, Hvar Island. The vessel was refloated by the Yugoslav Navy but was eventually scrapped.
Olib	Yugoslav Navy	Croatian War of Independence, Battle of the Dalmatian channels: The patrol boat was hit and sunk off Šćedro island by coastal batteries manned by Croatian navy personnel. Later savaged and repaired by the Yugoslav Navy.

=== 17 November ===
List of shipwrecks: 17 November 1991
Ship	State	Description
Mon Ami	United States	The Empire F type coaster was beached at Seal Island, Nova Scotia, Canada. She was declared a constructive total loss.

=== 18 November ===
List of shipwrecks: 18 November 1991
Ship	State	Description
USS Algol	United States Navy	The decommissioned Andromeda-class attack cargo ship was sunk in the Atlantic Ocean off the coast of New Jersey to form part of the Shark River artificial reef.

=== 20 November ===
List of shipwrecks: 20 November 1991
Ship	State	Description
Ross Revenge	Netherlands	The pirate radio ship ran aground on the Goodwin Sands, Kent, United Kingdom. All on board were rescued by a Royal Navy Helicopter. She was refloated the next day and subsequently returned to service.

=== 21 November ===
List of shipwrecks: 21 November 1991
Ship	State	Description
Easy Rider	United States	The 31-foot (9.4 m) shrimp-fishing vessel burned to the waterline and sank in Strawberry Channel (60.4106°N 146.0753°W) off Rugged Island (60°24′N 146°03′W) on the south-central coast of Alaska.
Kilkenny	Ireland	The container ship collided with the motor vessel Hasselwerder (Germany) in Dublin Bay and sank with the loss of three of her 14 crew.

=== 22 November ===
List of shipwrecks: 22 November 1991
Ship	State	Description
Harvey G	United States	The 94-foot (28.7 m) crab-fishing vessel sank in bad weather in the Bering Sea approximately 100 nautical miles (190 km; 120 mi) north of Cold Bay, Alaska, with the loss of her entire crew of four.

=== 23 November ===
List of shipwrecks: 23 November 1991
Ship	State	Description
Chatham	United States	While hauled out on the beach in Southeast Alaska for winter maintenance, the 82-foot (25.0 m) fishing vessel was destroyed by fire.

=== 24 November ===
List of shipwrecks: 24 November 1991
Ship	State	Description
Port King	United Kingdom	The 171-foot (52 m), 741-ton trawler sank 30 nautical miles (56 km) off Cies Island, Vigo Bay, Spain.

=== Unknown date ===
List of shipwrecks: Unknown November 1991
Ship	State	Description
Roditelj	Croatia	Croatian War of Independence, Siege of Dubrovnik: The sailing vessel was shelled by Yugoslav navy vessels and ground artillery at Dubrovnik and sank at Dubrovnik between 9–12 November. Raised and scrapped.
Sveti Vlaho	Croatia	Croatian War of Independence, Siege of Dubrovnik: The runabout/blockade runner ran aground 2 miles (3.2 km) north of Dubrovnik while being pursued by a Yugoslav patrol boat sometime in November (or possibly early December). Refloated and returned to service.

== December ==
=== 6 December ===
List of shipwrecks: 6 December 1991
Ship	State	Description
Al Awda	Palestine	The ferry sank in Yugoslavian waters.
Sveti Vlaho	Croatia	Croatian War of Independence, Siege of Dubrovnik: The runabout/ blockade runner was sunk by a Yugoslav 9K11 Malyutka missile at Gruž, north of Dubrovnik. She was raised in 2001 and is currently preserved as a monument.

=== 7 December ===
List of shipwrecks: 7 December 1991
Ship	State	Description
Wyoming	United States	The retired 100-foot (30.5 m) fishing trawler and clam dredger was scuttled as an artificial reef in the North Atlantic Ocean off Cape May, New Jersey, at 38°52.976′N 074°40.620′W.

=== 8 December ===
List of shipwrecks: 8 December 1991
Ship	State	Description
Peter H	United States	During a voyage from Homer to Seldovia, Alaska, the 36.6-foot (11.2 m) harbor tug broke up and sank in Kachemak Bay on the coast of Southcentral Alaska near Hesketh Island (59°30′26″N 151°30′51″W) and Barbara Point. The man and woman on board both died.

=== 10 December ===
List of shipwrecks: 10 December 1991
Ship	State	Description
Independencia	Unknown	The vessel sprung a leak and sank in the Pacific Ocean. The crew was rescued by a freighter the next day.

=== 12 December ===
List of shipwrecks: 12 December 1991
Ship	State	Description
Churruca	Spanish Navy	The decommissioned Gearing-class destroyer was sunk as a target.

=== 15 December ===
List of shipwrecks: 15 December 1991
Ship	State	Description
Salem Express	Egypt	The wreck of Salem Express in 2010 Just before midnight on 14 December, the ferry struck the Hyndman Reef, capsized, and sank in the Red Sea (26°38′22″N 34°03′39″E) with the loss of 464 of the 644 people on board.

== Unknown date ==
List of shipwrecks: Unknown Date 1991
Ship	State	Description
Antoxo	Spain	The 94.25-foot (28.73 m), 153-ton trawler was wrecked sometime in 1991.
HMS Arethusa	Royal Navy	The decommissioned Leander-class frigate was sunk as a target.
Attica	Iraqi Navy	First Gulf War, Operation Desert Storm: Battle of Bubiyan: The Project 773K-class landing ship was sunk by British aircraft between 29 January and 4 February.
Idene	United States	The 120-foot (37 m) fishing dragger was scuttled in 85 feet (26 m) of water in the Atlantic Ocean off the coast of Rhode Island 4 nautical miles (7.4 km; 4.6 mi) south of Block Island to form an artificial reef.
Mr. J	United States	The crab processor – a former PCE-842-class patrol craft and auxiliary minelayer – was towed out into the Pacific Ocean and scuttled sometime in the 1990s.
Nouh	Iraqi Navy	First Gulf War, Operation Desert Storm: Battle of Bubiyan: The Project 773K-class landing ship was sunk by British aircraft between 29 January and 4 February.
No. 223	Iraqi Navy	First Gulf War, Operation Desert Storm: Battle of Bubiyan: The Project 368-class patrol boat was sunk by Coalition aircraft between 29 January and 4 February.
No. 224	Iraqi Navy	First Gulf War, Operation Desert Storm: Battle of Bubiyan: The Project 368-class patrol boat was sunk by Coalition aircraft between 29 January and 4 February.
No. 225	Iraqi Navy	First Gulf War, Operation Desert Storm: Battle of Bubiyan: The Project 376-class patrol boat was sunk by Coalition aircraft between 29 January and 4 February.
No. 226	Iraqi Navy	First Gulf War, Operation Desert Storm: Battle of Bubiyan: The Project 376-class patrol boat was sunk by Coalition aircraft between 29 January and 4 February.
No. 227	Iraqi Navy	First Gulf War, Operation Desert Storm: Battle of Bubiyan: The Project 376-class patrol boat was sunk by Coalition aircraft between 29 January and 4 February.
No. 301	Iraqi Navy	First Gulf War, Operation Desert Storm: Battle of Bubiyan: The Project 201M-class submarine chasers was sunk by coalition aircraft between 29 January and 4 February.
No. 311	Iraqi Navy	First Gulf War, Operation Desert Storm: Battle of Bubiyan: The Project 201M-class submarine chasers was sunk by coalition aircraft between 29 January and 4 February.
No. 312	Iraqi Navy	First Gulf War, Operation Desert Storm: Battle of Bubiyan: The Project 201M-class submarine chasers was sunk by coalition aircraft between 29 January and 4 February.
Three unidentified missile boats	Iraqi Navy	First Gulf War, Operation Desert Storm: Battle of Bubiyan: Three Lurrsen Type 45 missile boats were sunk by British aircraft between 29 January and 4 February.
Two unidentified patrol boats	Iraqi Navy	First Gulf War, Operation Desert Storm: Battle of Bubiyan: Two 1400E patrol boats were sunk by British aircraft between 29 January and 4 February.
Unidentified minesweeper/minelayer	Iraqi Navy	First Gulf War, Operation Desert Storm: Battle of Bubiyan: A Project 254 minesweeper/minelayer was sunk by British aircraft between 29 January and 4 February.
Two unidentified salvage ships	Iraqi Navy	First Gulf War, Operation Desert Storm:Battle of Bubiyan: Two Project 368 salvage ships were sunk by British aircraft between 29 January and 4 February.
