= China Railways YJ =

YJ 跃进
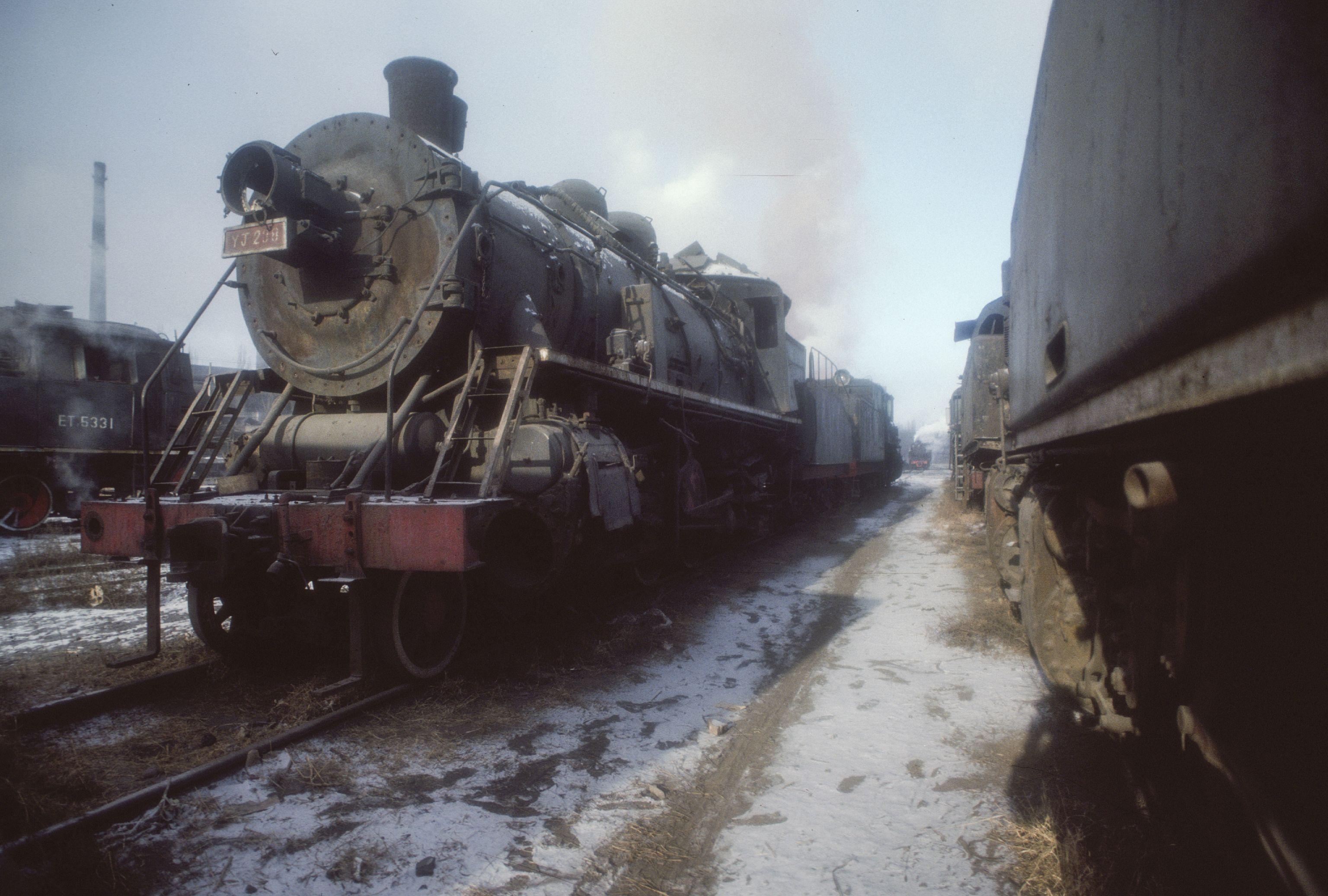
- YJ-238 in Baotou
Type and origin
- Power type: Steam
- Builder: Jinan Railway Vehicles Equipment Co.; Tangshan Railway Vehicle
- Serial number: YJ 101–180 (Tangshan Railway Vehicle); YJ 201–320 (Jinan Railway Vehicles Equipment Co.)
- Model: YJ
- Build date: 1958–1961
- Total produced: 202
Specifications
- Configuration
  - Whyte: 2-6-2
- Gauge: 1,435 mm (4 ft 8 1/2 in)
- Driver dia.: 1,370 mm (53.94 in)
- Length: 18.3 m (60 ft 0.5 in)
- Fuel type: Coal
- Tender cap.: 7 t (6.9 long tons; 7.7 short tons) (coal), 19 m^{3} (671 cu ft) (water)
- Cylinders: Two, outside
- Cylinder size: 530 mm × 710 mm (20.866 in × 27.953 in); 482 mm × 660 mm (18.976 in × 25.984 in)(YJ 201-250); 500 mm × 710 mm (19.685 in × 27.953 in)(YJ 251-???) bore x stroke
- Valve gear: Walschaerts
- Valve type: Piston valves
- Loco brake: Air
- Train brakes: Air
- Couplers: Knuckle
Performance figures
- Maximum speed: 60 km/h (37 mph)
Career
- Operators: China Railway
- Number in class: 202
- Numbers: 101–180, 201–320
- Delivered: 1958
- First run: 1958
- Last run: 1961
- Retired: 2002
- Preserved: 2
- Disposition: 2 preserved, remainder scrapped

The China Railways YJ (Chinese: 跃进; pinyin: Yuè Jìn; lit. 'leap forward') are a type of 2-6-2 "Prairie" type steam locomotives, their design is based on China Railways PL2 class 2-6-2, itself derived from the JF6 2-8-2, the predecessor of the well known SY class mikado. According to Chinese sources a total of 202 locos were produced between 1958 and 1961.

At least two YJs are preserved. No. 232 was last reported in service in 2002 and is now on display at the Baotou Steelworks, No. 269 is on display at Diaobingshan, Tiefa, Liaoning.

== See also ==
- China Railways JF6
- China Railways SY
- China Railways PL2
