= China Railways PL2 =

China Railways PL2 Mantetsu Pureni(プレニ)
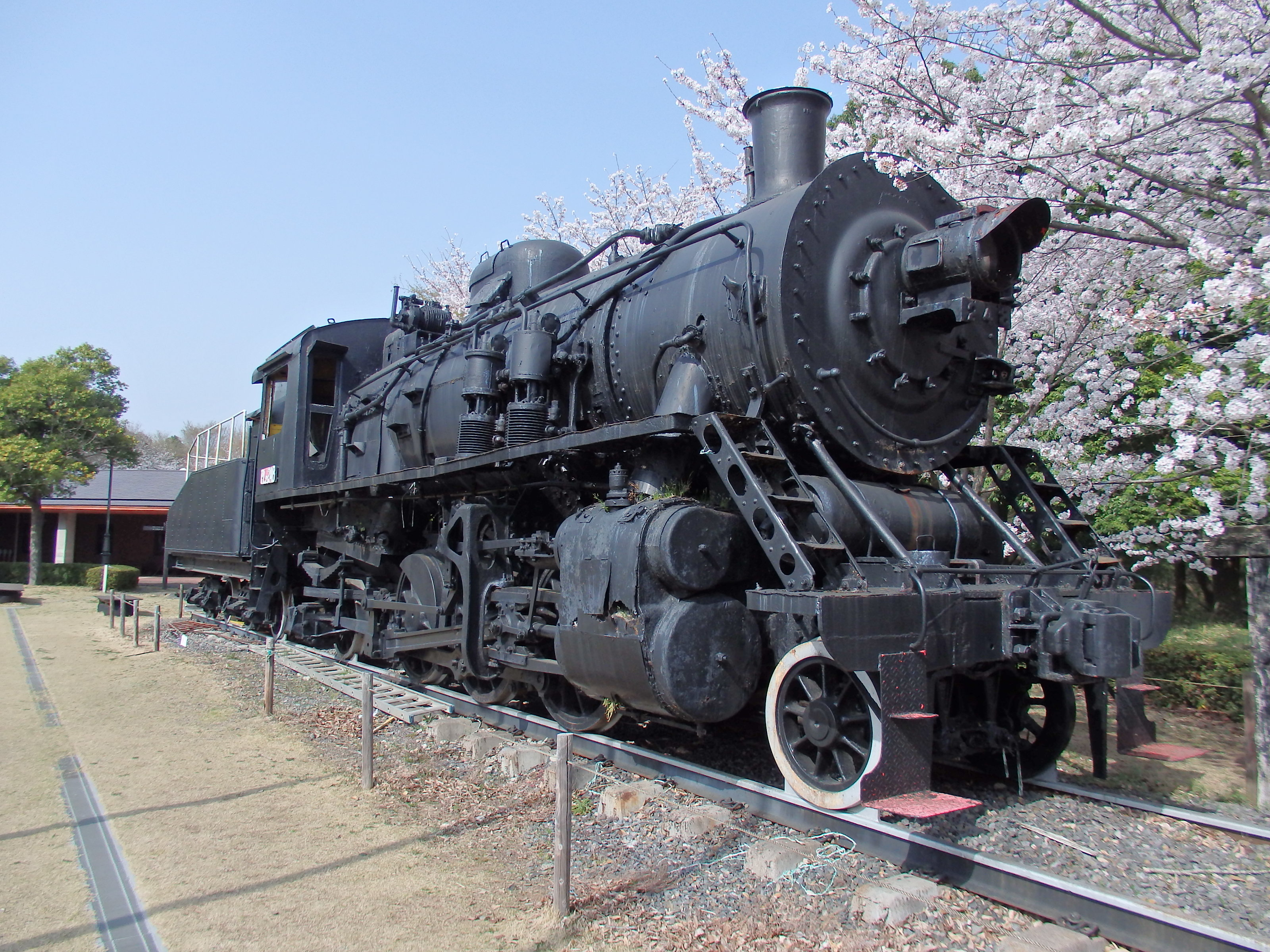
- PL2-248, Kiraku-yama park, Tsukubamirai, Ibaraki, Japan, March 2018
Type and origin
- Power type: Steam
- Builder: Nippon Sharyō; Tangshan Railway Vehicle
- Serial number: プレニ 1–20 (SMR), PL2 31–50, various other numbers (CR)
- Build date: 1935, 1958–1959
Specifications
- Configuration
  - Whyte: 2-6-2
- Gauge: 1,435 mm (4 ft 8 1/2 in)
- Driver dia.: 1,370 mm (53.94 in)
- Length: 18.226 m (59 ft 9 1/2 in)
- Loco weight: 68 t (66.9 long tons; 75.0 short tons)
- Tender weight: 22.5 t (22.1 long tons; 24.8 short tons)
- Fuel type: Coal
- Tender cap.: 6 t (5.9 long tons; 6.6 short tons) (coal), 18 m^{3} (636 cu ft) (water)
- Cylinders: Two, outside
- Cylinder size: 500 mm × 610 mm (19.685 in × 24.016 in) bore x stroke
- Loco brake: Air
- Train brakes: Air
- Couplers: Knuckle
Performance figures
- Maximum speed: 60 km/h (37 mph)
Career
- Operators: South Manchuria Railway; China Railway
- Numbers: 1–20, 31–50, 248, various other numbers
- Delivered: 1935, 1958–1959
- First run: 1935
- Retired: February 2000
- Preserved: 1
- Disposition: 1 preserved, remainder scrapped

The PL2 class 2-6-2 "Prairie" is one of the industrial locomotives used by China Railway, originally built in 1935 by Nippon Sharyō for the South Manchuria Railway, which designated them Pureni (プレニ) class.

After the war, Pureni class locomotives were taken over by the China Railway, becoming class ㄆㄌ2 in 1951, later PL2 in 1959, numbers 31–50. The PL2's were dispatched by diesels in February 2000 with No. 244 being the last one reported in service at the Anshan Steelworks.

== Preservation ==
- PL2–248 is preserved at Kiraku-yama park, Tsukubamirai, Ibaraki, Japan.

== See also ==
- China Railways JF6
- China Railways SY
- China Railways YJ
