= MV Protektor =

Bulk cargo ship

MV Protektor was a bulk cargo ship that sank in the North Atlantic Ocean in January 1991 with the loss of her entire crew.

Protektor was built by Flender Werke in Lübeck, Germany. She was launched on 17 December 1966 and delivered on 22 March 1967, bearing the name Ursula Schulte and sailing under the German flag. In 1978, she was renamed Protektor, and was registered in Singapore at the time of her loss. She had a gross tonnage of 43,218 GT and a deadweight tonnage of 78,918 DWT, and measured 253 metres (830 ft) in length, with a beam of 35.2 metres (115 ft). She was powered by a single diesel engine that gave her a speed of 15 knots (28 km/h).

In January 1991, Protektor was sailing eastbound from Port-Cartier, Quebec to Oxelösund, Sweden with a cargo of iron ore when she ran into a severe winter storm about 260 miles (420 km) southeast of Newfoundland. Early on the morning of 13 January, the crew made a distress call indicating that the ship's cargo hold had been breached and she was taking on water, leading the crew to prepare to abandon ship. The Canadian Air Force dispatched a search plane, but radio contact was lost with Protektor before she was ever located. A search effort continued, but with severe weather remaining in the area it was called off at the end of the following day, with all 33 crew members presumed dead.
