= Guilin University of Aerospace Technology =

University in Guilin, China

Coordinates: 25.282°N 110.369°E

- 桂林航天工业学院
- Type: Public
- Established: 1979; 47 years ago
- Location: Guilin, Guangxi, China
- Campus: Suburban, 68.7 hectares (170 acres)
- Website: www.guat.edu.cn

Guilin University of Aerospace Technology (GUAT) is a public university in Guilin, Guangxi, China.

GUAT offers Bachelor's degrees and higher education diplomas in engineering and technology, as well as management, business and arts.

GUAT was founded in 1979 and run by the former Aerospace Ministry of China, and has over 10,000 students.

== Departments ==
- School of Management
- School of Aerospace Tourism
- School of Mechanical Engineering
- School of Electronic and Automation Engineering
- School of Auto and Transport Engineering
- School of Energy, Architecture and Environment
- Department of Computer Science and Engineering
- Department of Foreign Language and Trade
- Department of Media and Art Design

=== Undergraduate courses ===
- BA. Accounting
- BA. Administrative Management
- BA. Advertising
- BA. Animation
- BA. Art Design
- BA. Business Management
- BA. E-Commerce
- BA. English Language
- BA. Human Resources Management
- BA. Information Management and Information Systems
- BA. Japanese Language
- BA. Marketing
- BA. Project Management
- BA. Tourism Management
- BEc. International Trade and Economics
- BEng. Architecture
- BEng. Automation
- BEng. Bio-engineering
- BEng. Chemical Engineering and Technology
- BEng. Civil Engineering
- BEng. Communications Engineering
- BEng. Computer Science and Technology
- BEng. Electronic Information Engineering
- BEng. Environmental Engineering
- BEng. Hydrographic and Resources Engineering
- BEng. Industrial Design
- BEng. Inorganic and Non-metallic Materials Engineering
- BEng. Jewelry and Materials Technology
- BEng. Macromolecular Materials and Engineering
- BEng. Mechanic Manufacture & Automation
- BEng. Prospecting and Engineering
- BEng. Resource Exploration Engineering
- BEng. Survey Engineering
- BEng. Urban Planning
- BEng. Water Supply and Drainage Engineering
- BSc. Applied Chemistry
- BSc. Applied Physics
- BSc. Electronic Information Science and Technology
- BSc. Environmental Science
- BSc. Forestry Resources Protection and Leisure
- BSc. Geographic Information Systems
- BSc. Geology
- BSc. Geophysics
- BSc. Information and Computing Science
- BSc. Materials Chemistry
- BSc. Resources Environment and Urban and Regional Planning Management
- BSc. Statistics
- LLB. Social Work
