= China Railways SY =

Class of Chinese 2-8-2 steam locomotives

SY; 上游
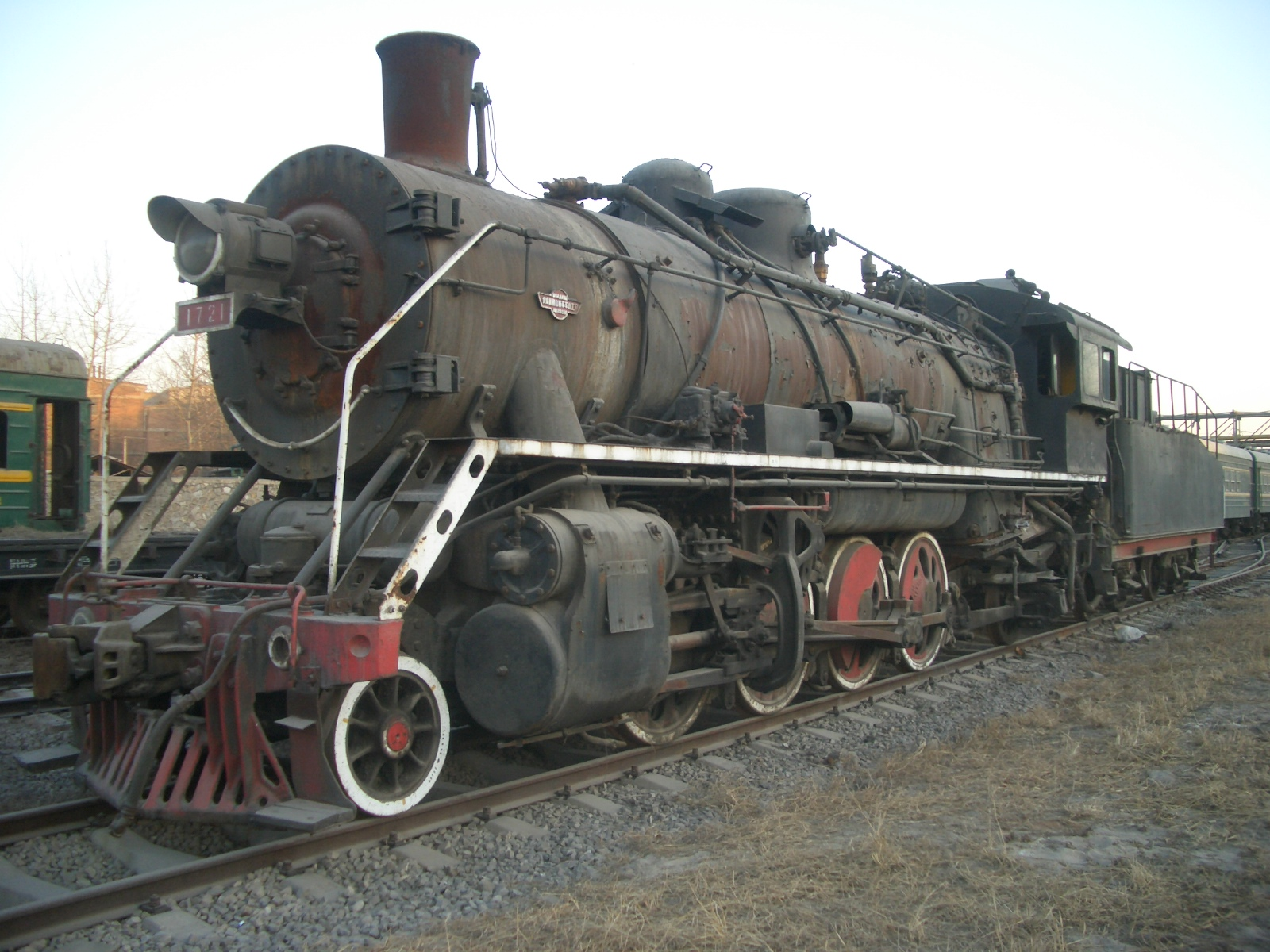
- SY-1721 idling at the Tangshan Works, December 2005
Type and origin
- Power type: Steam
- Builder: Tangshan Railway Vehicle; Changchun Railway Vehicle; Jinan Railway Vehicles Equipment; Tongling Railway Vehicle; Sifang General Repair Works
- Model: SY
- Build date: 1960–1999
- Total produced: 1,800+
Specifications
- Configuration
  - Whyte: 2-8-2
  - UIC: 1’D1’
- Gauge: 4 ft 8 1/2 in (1,435 mm) standard gauge
- Leading dia.: 840 mm (33 in; 2.76 ft)
- Driver dia.: 1,370 mm (54 in; 4.49 ft)
- Trailing dia.: 1,000 mm (39 in; 3.3 ft)
- Wheelbase
  - Engine: 31 ft 4 in (9.55 m)
  - Drivers: 14 ft 6 in (4.42 m)
- Length: 21,643 mm (852.1 in; 71.007 ft)
- Width: 3,300 mm (130 in; 10.8 ft)
- Height: 4,446 mm (175.0 in; 14.587 ft)
- Adhesive weight: 70 t (150,000 lb; 70,000 kg)
- Loco weight: 84 t (185,000 lb; 84,000 kg)
- Tender weight: 54.5 t (120,000 lb; 54,500 kg)
- Tender type: Sloped-back
- Fuel type: Coal
- Fuel capacity: 9.5 t (21,000 lb; 9,500 kg)
- Water cap.: 25,000 L (6,600 US gal)
- Firebox
  - Grate area: 4.57 m^{2} (49.2 sq ft)
- Boiler pressure: 210 psi (1,400 kPa)
- Heating surface: 161 m^{2} (1,733.0 sq ft)
- Superheater
  - Heating area: 65.5 m^{2} (705.0 sq ft)
- Cylinders: Two, outside
- Cylinder size: 530 mm × 710 mm (21 in × 28 in)
- Valve gear: Walschaerts
- Valve type: Piston valves
- Loco brake: Air
- Train brakes: Air
- Couplers: Knuckle
Performance figures
- Maximum speed: 50 mph (80.47 km/h)
- Power output: 1,500 hp (1,100 kW)
- Tractive effort: 20,475 kgf (45,140 lbf; 200.79 kN)
- Factor of adh.: 4.05
Career
- Operators: China Railway; Valley Railroad; Knox and Kane Railroad; New York, Susquehanna and Western Railway; NYS&W Technical and Historical Society; Belvidere and Delaware River Railway
- Number in class: 1,800+
- Numbers: 0017–3016
- Delivered: 1960
- First run: 1960
- Last run: April 2022
- Retired: 25 April 2022
- Preserved: 61
- Disposition: 61 preserved (58 in China, 2 in USA, 1 in South Korea), remainder scrapped

The China Railways SY (Chinese: 上游; pinyin: Shàng Yóu; lit. 'Aim High') are a type of 2-8-2 "Mikado" type steam locomotives, they were operated by the China Railway and hauled both heavy freight and mainline passengers trains. They were built mostly by the Tangshan Locomotive and Rolling Stock Works between 1960 and 1999.

== History and design ==
The SY class was developed by the Dalian Locomotive and Rolling Stock Co., and the primary purpose for the locomotives was usage in industrial services. The basis for the SYs was the JF6 class, which was already a lighter variant of the JF1 class designed by the American Locomotive Company (ALCO), but the SYs would incorporate some newer design features introduced on other locomotives, such as the JS and RM classes. The SY features the JF6s lacked included taller smokestacks, different front step and handrail arrangements, different motion bracket arrangements, a higher boiler pressure (210 psi (1,400 kPa), a lower axle loading (15 tonnes (33,000 lb), and all boxpok driving wheels.

The new class was originally designated as the GN (Chinese: 工农; pinyin: Gong Nong; lit. 'Workers and Peasants'), but it was quickly changed to SY (Chinese: 上游; pinyin: Shàng Yóu; lit. 'Aim High'). The SY designation was possibly influenced by a quote from Mao Zedong (Chinese: 全力以赴、志存高远，在社会主义建设中取得更大、更快、更好、更省的成果。; lit. 'Go all out', 'aim high', 'and achieve greater', 'faster', 'better and more economical results in building socialism.'). The prototype SY (SY-0001) was constructed in 1960, by the Tangshan Locomotive and Rolling Stock Works, and thirteen others followed suit that same year.

The first SYs were originally equipped with design features incorporated by the JF series, including the same horizontal cab and tender designs, stepped running boards, and disc leading wheels. In 1961, the Sifang General Repair Works erected two more prototype SYs, both of which were exported to Vietnam, the following year. By 1966, the SY design became finalized with some standardized changes, including a widened cab, and commercial production on the class began. Tangshan would construct over 1,700 SY locomotives, but some would also be built by workshops in Jinan, Tongling, and Changchun.

In service, all of the SYs were assigned to shunt and haul freight trains in numerous industrial areas throughout China, including coal mines, iron ore mines, petroleum fields, chemical plants, power stations, steel mills, and machine factories. In mining areas with long-distance rail networks, the SYs would also be assigned to haul passenger trains. Sometime during production, the SY class received a new tender tank design with sloped-back sides to improve rearward vision for crews, since SYs often operated in reverse, during industrial service. The first locomotive to receive the new tender design was SY-0877.

SY production was halted by a July 1976 earthquake, which affected Tangshan's factory, and resumed in late 1979 or early 1980. The final steam locomotive built in China for use on national railways was SY-1772, completed at Tangshan, in October 1999. After the end of commercial steam operations on Chinese main lines on 27 December 2005, some SYs still remained in service for some industrial firms, such as the Sandaoling Coal Mine Railway in the Xinjiang Uyghur Autonomous Region. On 25 April 2022, Sandaoling discontinued their regular steam operations, making them the final railway company in the world to end commercial service for steam locomotives, although Sandaoling continued to use their JS class locomotives as backups to their Diesel motive power, until steam operations officially ended on 15 January 2024.

== Export ==
The SY class was also among the few Chinese steam locomotives to be exported to the United States. In 1989 and 1991, three SYs were constructed for tourist railroads in the United States, SY-1647M ('M' Chinese: 美国; pinyin: Měiguǒ; lit. 'America') for the Valley Railroad and SY-1658M for the Knox and Kane Railroad were built in 1989 at a cost of $300,000, with a third being built in 1991 for the New York, Susquehanna and Western Railway. This third one was lost at sea during shipment in the Indian Ocean, when the ship it was on sunk, after springing a leak.

The Susquehanna later purchased SY-1647M from the Valley Railroad, renumbering it as 142. No. 142 ran throughout the NYS&W system until its transfer to the New York Susquehanna & Western Technical & Historical Society in 2003 and now operates on the Belvidere and Delaware River Railway in Phillipsburg, New Jersey. SY1658m was renumbered 58 in the mid to late 1990s. After the main draw of the Knox and Kane Railroad, the Kinzua Bridge collapsed in mid 2003, the 58 was withdrawn from service and moved with other equipment to an engine house in Kane, Pennsylvania. On the morning of 16 March 2008, No. 58 was damaged when the engine house it was stored in was burned by arson. No. 58 was purchased later that year by the Valley Railroad at an auction. Upon purchase, the 58 was renumbered 3025 and was given a complete rebuild which included cosmetic alterations to make it resemble a New Haven 2-8-2.

One was bought by the Korean National Railroad in 1994, numbered 901, and operated for excursion trains. It has been out of service since 2012.

Nos. 1647 and 1658 were 2 of the 6 Chinese steam locomotives to be exported to the United States, the others exported being QJ class Nos. 6988, 7040, 7081 and JS Class 8419.

== Preservation ==
- SY-0017: is preserved at the Fangzi Coal Mine Heritage Park, Weifang.
- SY-0024: is preserved at Maanshan Iron & Steel Co., Ltd.
- SY-0051: is preserved at the Hubei Huangshi National Mine Park.
- SY-0053: is preserved at the Maanshan Iron & Steel Co., Ltd.
- SY-0057: is preserved at the Dalian Software Park.
- SY-0072: is preserved at the Lingyuan Iron and Steel Group Corporation.
- SY-0192: is preserved at the Former Guizhou-Guangxi Railway Bridge, Chengbei New District, Duyun.
- SY-0194: is preserved at the Lanzhou JiaoTong University.
- SY-0223: is preserved at the Changchun Park.
- SY-0232: is preserved at the Yakeshi Railway Station.
- SY-0309: is preserved at the Dashanzi Art District, Beijing.
- SY-0320: is preserved at the Panzhihua Third-line Construction Museum.
- SY-0359: is preserved at the Junior College of Tourism.
- SY-0364: is preserved at the Tangshan Locomotive and Rolling Stock Works.
- SY-0368: is preserved at the Gourmet Mansion in Nanjing.
- SY-0381: is preserved at the Discovery Park, Hengyang.
- SY-0386: is preserved at an unknown location, on static display.
- SY-0388: is preserved at the Yunnan Railway Museum.
- SY-0405: is preserved at the Liupanshui Third-line Construction Museum.
- SY-0427: is preserved at the Tianjin Haijin Bridge Park.
- SY-0452: is preserved at the Harbin Railway Station.
- SY-0465: is preserved at the Sichuan International Tourism Trade Fair Center.
- SY-0477: is preserved at the Hengdaohezi Locomotive Depot, Mudanjiang.
- SY-0514: is preserved at the Xiaoyutuo Railway Station, Chongqing.
- SY-0516: is preserved at the Jiayang National Mine Park Museum.
- SY-0590: is preserved at the Suifenhe Great Railway House.
- SY-0590: is preserved at the Jiangyue Road No. 1500, Minhang District, Shanghai.
- SY-0652: is preserved at the Dalian Modern Museum.
- SY-0658: is preserved at the Handan East railway station, Handan, China.
- SY-0764: is lying derelict at the Zhaogezhuang (赵各庄) Coal Mine sidings (near Tangshan).
- SY-0862: is preserved at the Shanghai Chedun Film Base.
- SY-0913: is preserved at Guilin, Guangxi.
- SY-0942 on display at the Xishan Park in Haining, Zhejiang, China.
- SY-0955: is preserved at the Tangshan National Mine Park & China Railway Origin Museum.
- SY-0965: is preserved at the Baiyin Mine & Smelter Complex.
- SY-1000: is preserved at the Liuzhou Locomotive and Rolling Stock Works.
- SY-1004: is preserved at the Shandong Jiaotong University.
- SY-1034: is preserved at the Lintong Longhai Railway Park (Now renamed SY-1088).
- SY-1068: is lying derelict at the Linxi (林西) Coal Mine sidings.
- SY-1085: is preserved at the China Academy of Railway Sciences.
- SY-1088: is lying derelict at the Linxi (林西) Coal Mine sidings.
- SY-1096: is preserved at the Shenyang Railway Museum.
- SY-1118: is preserved at the Beihai Park, Suifenhe
- SY-1171: is lying derelict at the Linxi (林西) Coal Mine sidings.
- SY-1267: is lying derelict at the start of the Gaoyi Railway in Gaobeidian.
- SY-1356: is preserved at the Tangshan National Mine Park & China Railway Origin Museum.
- SY-1453: is preserved at the Urumqi West Station.
- SY-1504: is preserved at the Liuzhou Industrial Museum.
- SY-1583: is preserved in Baiyin, China.
- SY-1599: is preserved in Tangzitou, China.
- SY-1647: is preserved at the Belvedere and Delaware River Railway in the US.
- SY-1658: is preserved at the Connecticut Valley Railroad in the US.
- SY-1670: is preserved at the Shanghai Institute of Technology.
- SY-1680: is lying derelict at the Zhaogezhuang (赵各庄) Coal Mine sidings nearTangshan.
- SY-1700: is lying derelict at the Linxi (林西) Coal Mine sidings.
- SY-1701: is preserved at the Hangzhou Baita Park.
- SY-1702: is preserved at the Guilin University of Aerospace Technology.
- SY-1736: is lying derelict at the Zhaogezhuang (赵各庄) Coal Mine sidings nearTangshan.
- SY-1748: is preserved at the Shanghai Youth Square.
- SY-1770: is preserved in operable condition on the Tiefa railway, a former railway now used as a tourist line.
- SY-1772: with sister locomotive 1770 is preserved in operable condition on the Tiefa railway, a former railway now used as a tourist line.
- SY-2012: is lying derelict at an unknown location in China.
- SY-3016: is preserved by Korail in South Korea.

== Gallery ==
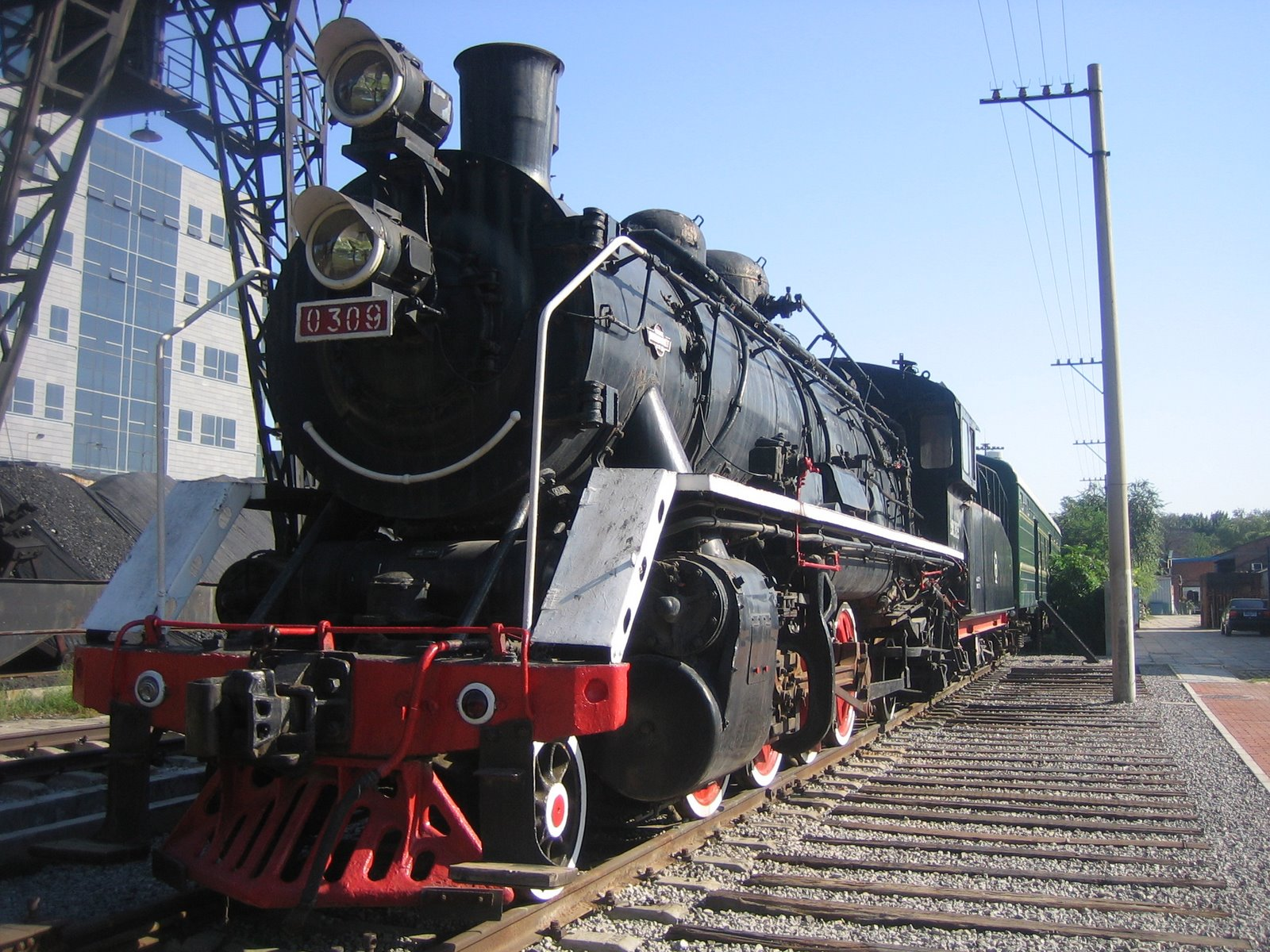
SY-0309 on display at the Dashanzi Art District in Beijing

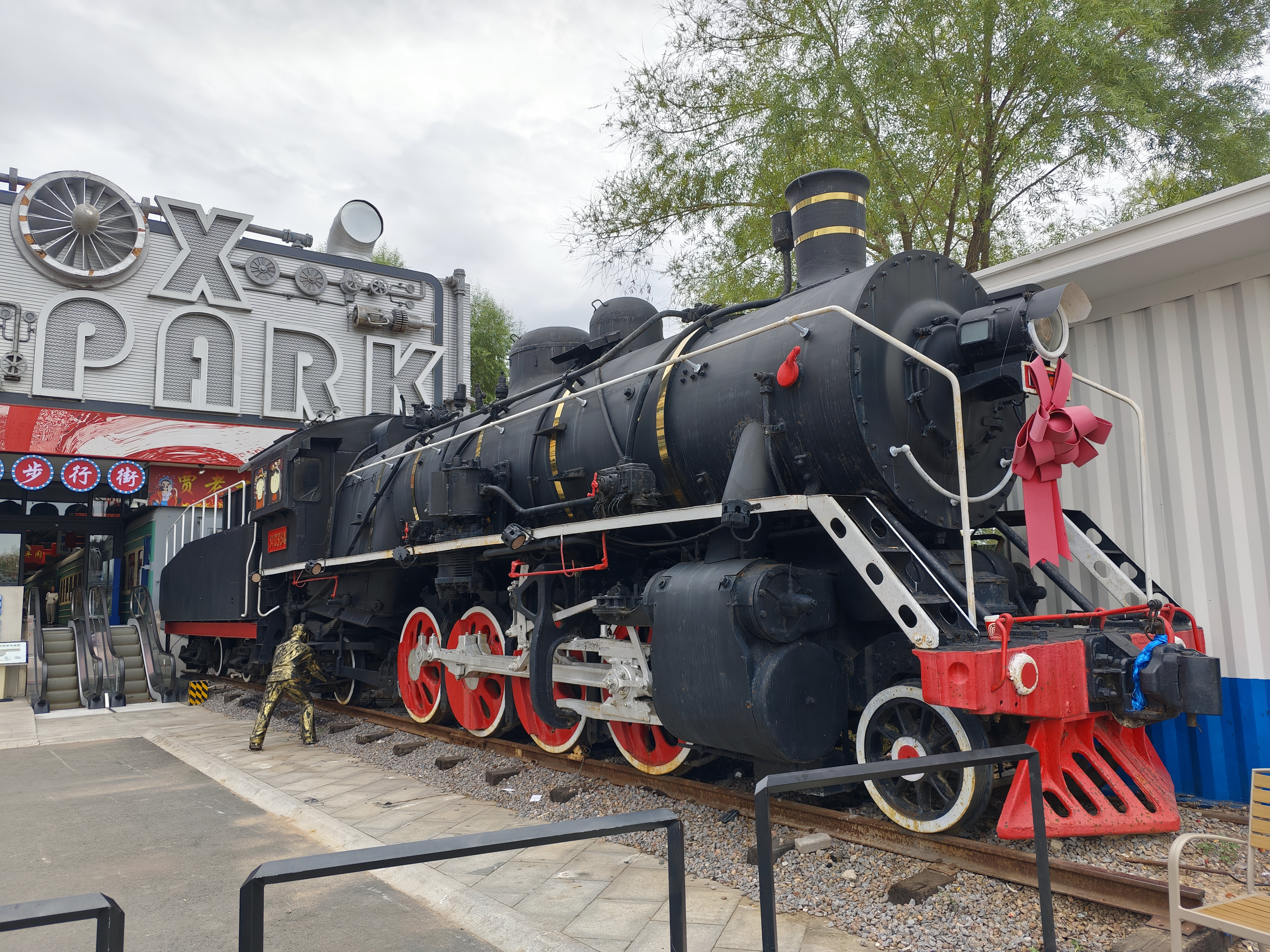
SY-0364 on display at the Tangshan Locomotive and Rolling Stock Works

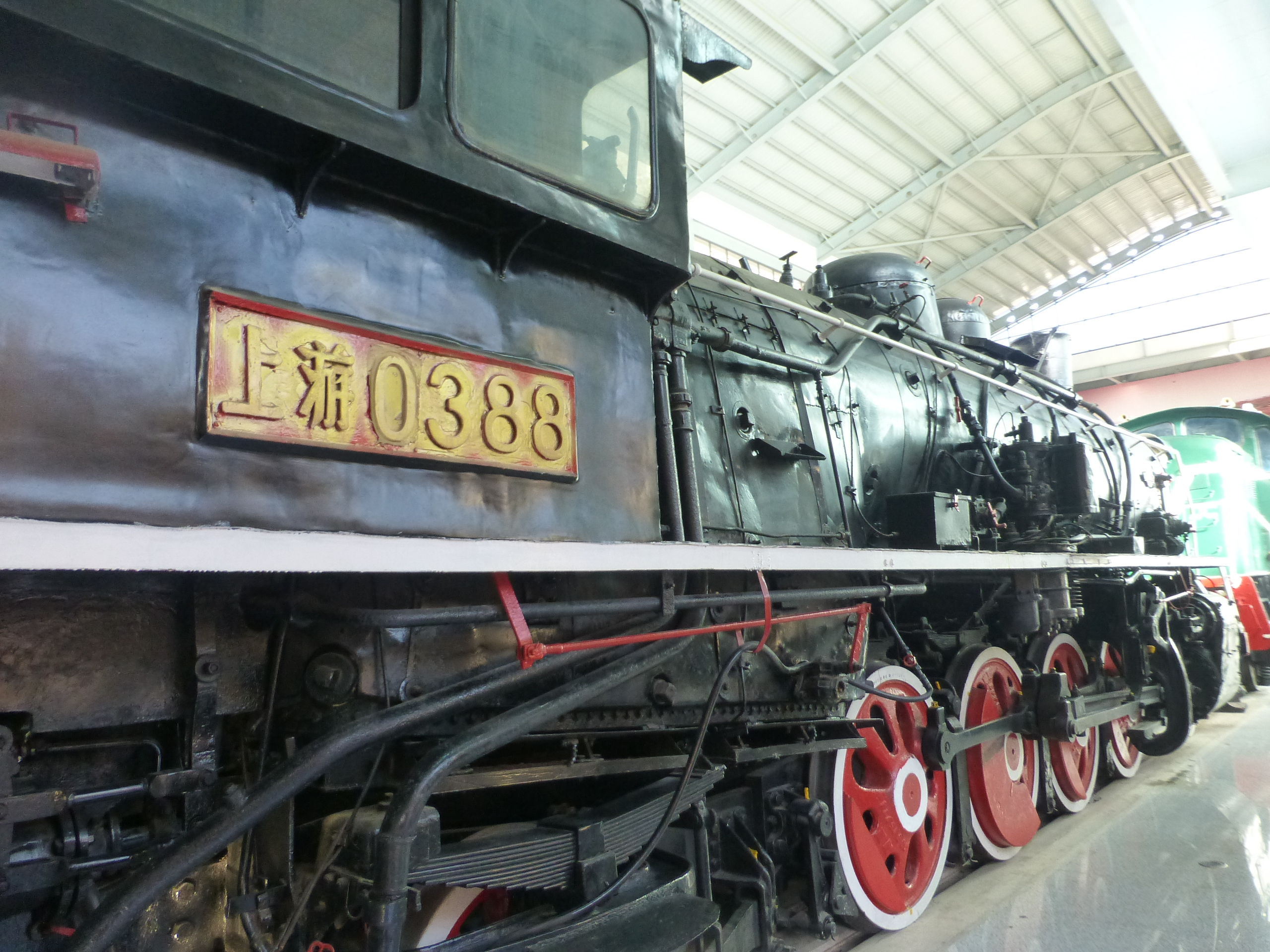
SY-0388 on display at the Yunnan Railway Museum

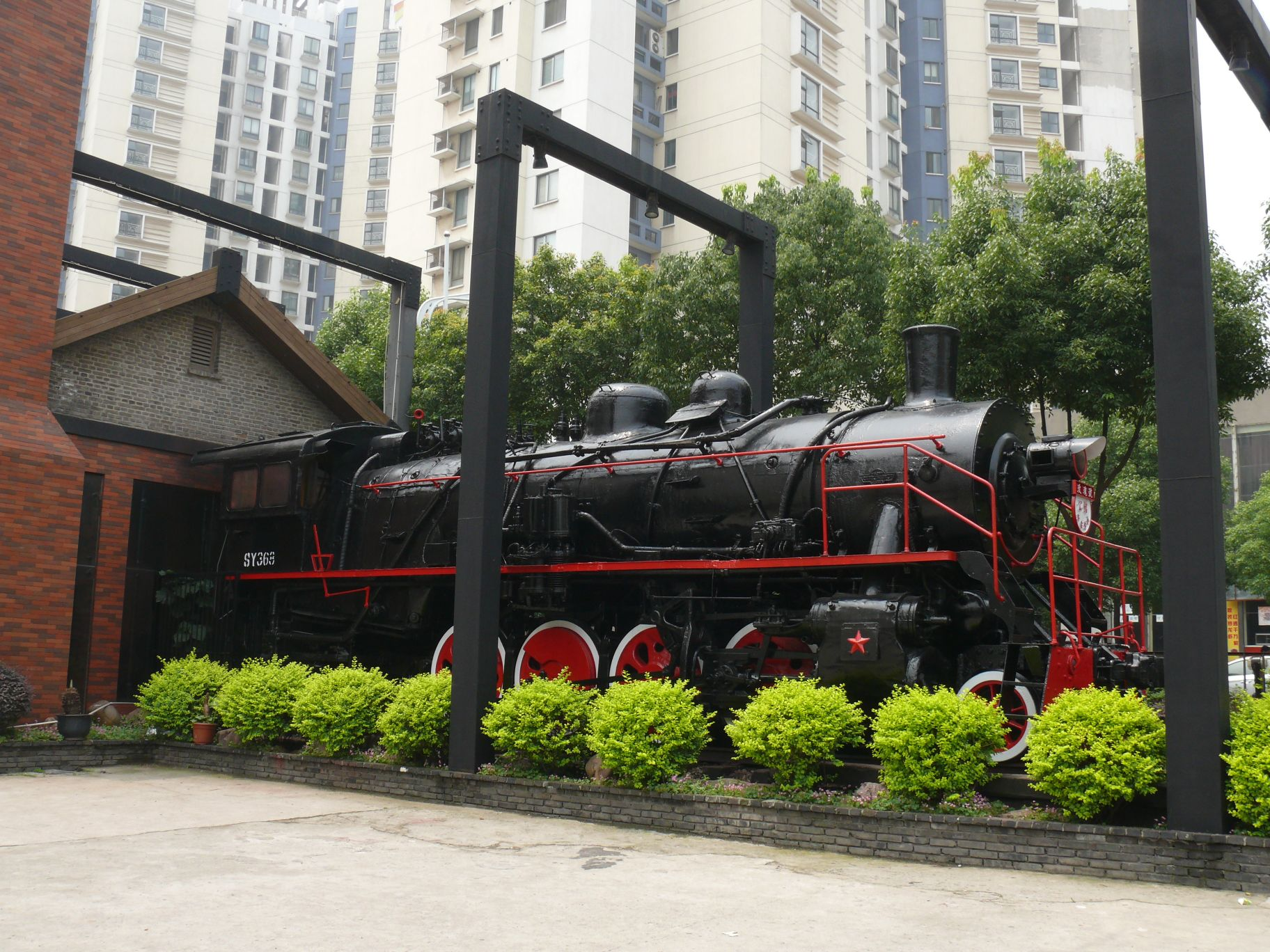
SY-0368 on display in front of the restaurant Gourmet Mansion in Nanjing

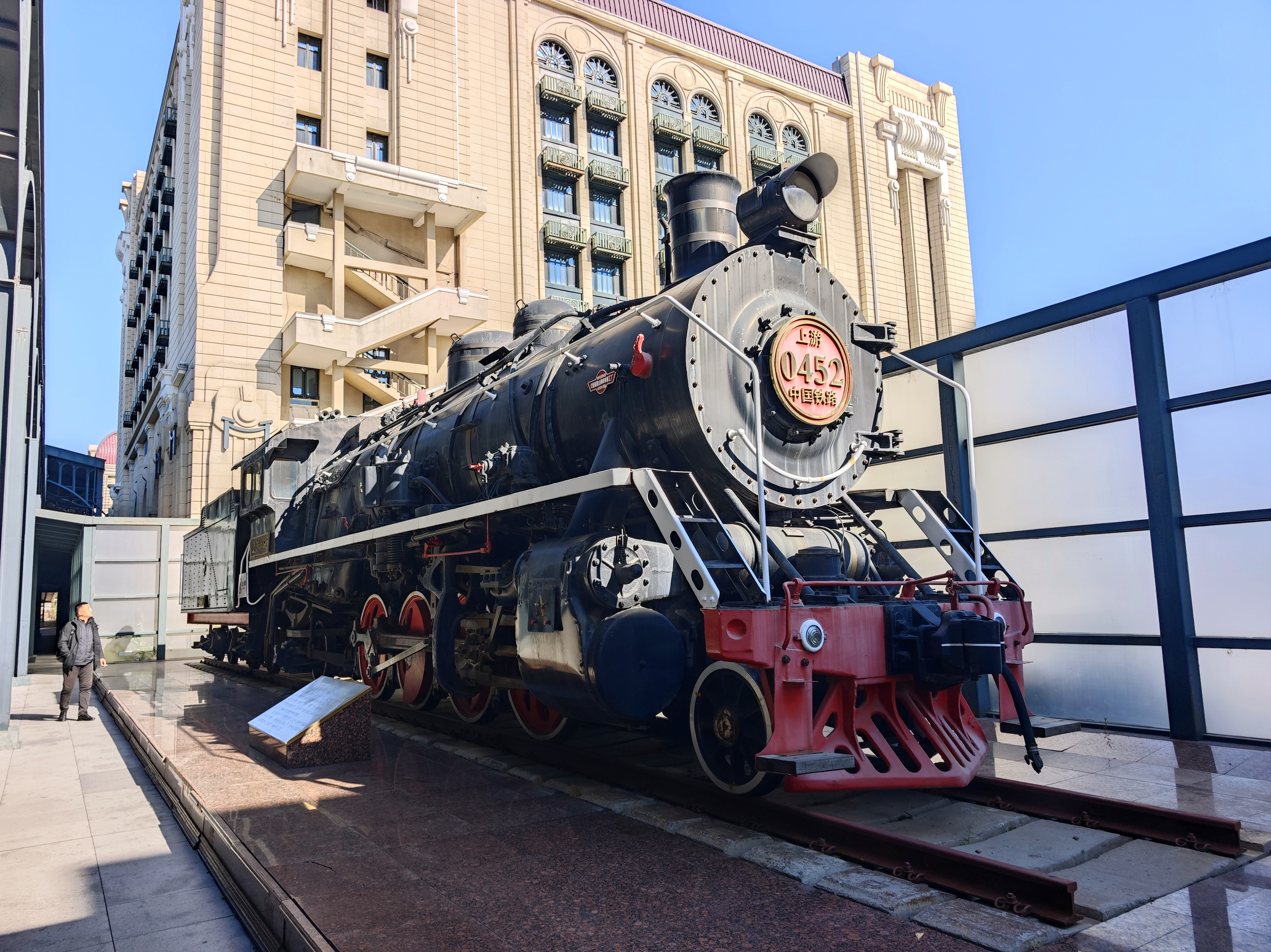
SY-0452 on display at the Harbin Railway Station

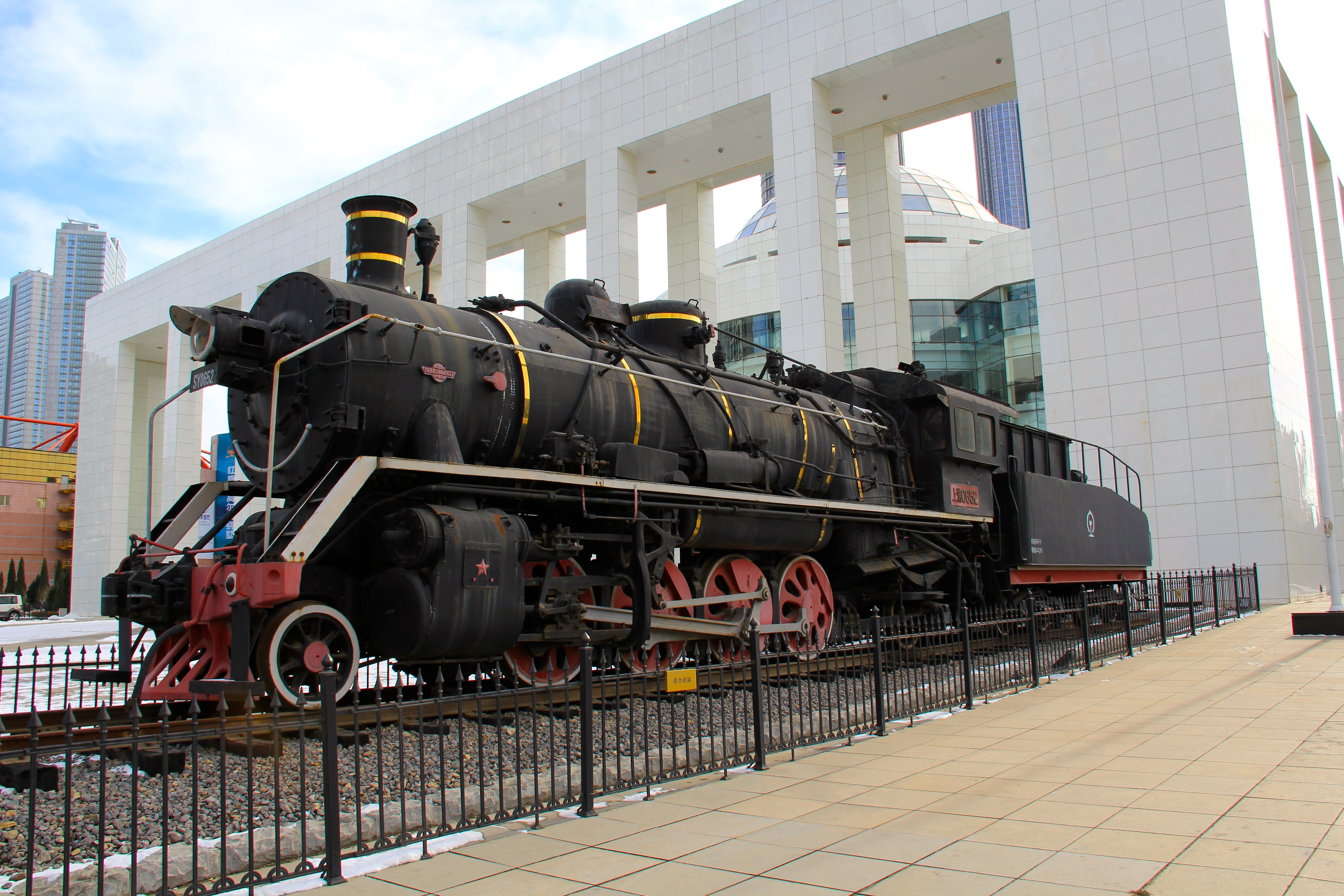
SY-0652 on display at the Dalian Modern Museum

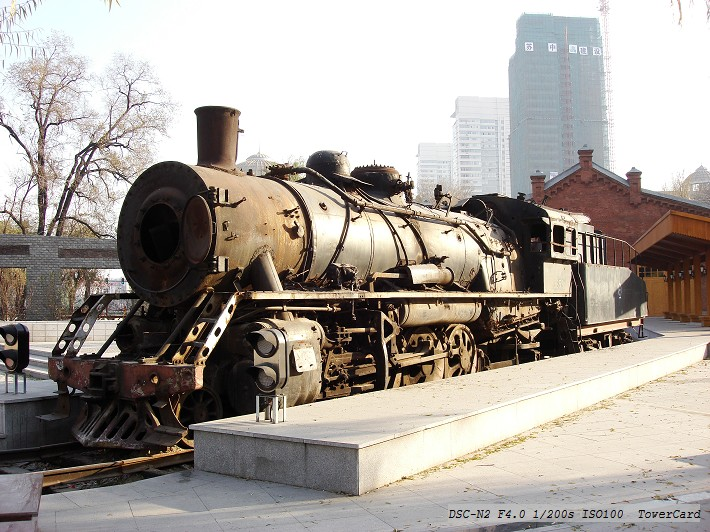
SY-0658 on display at the Handan East railway station

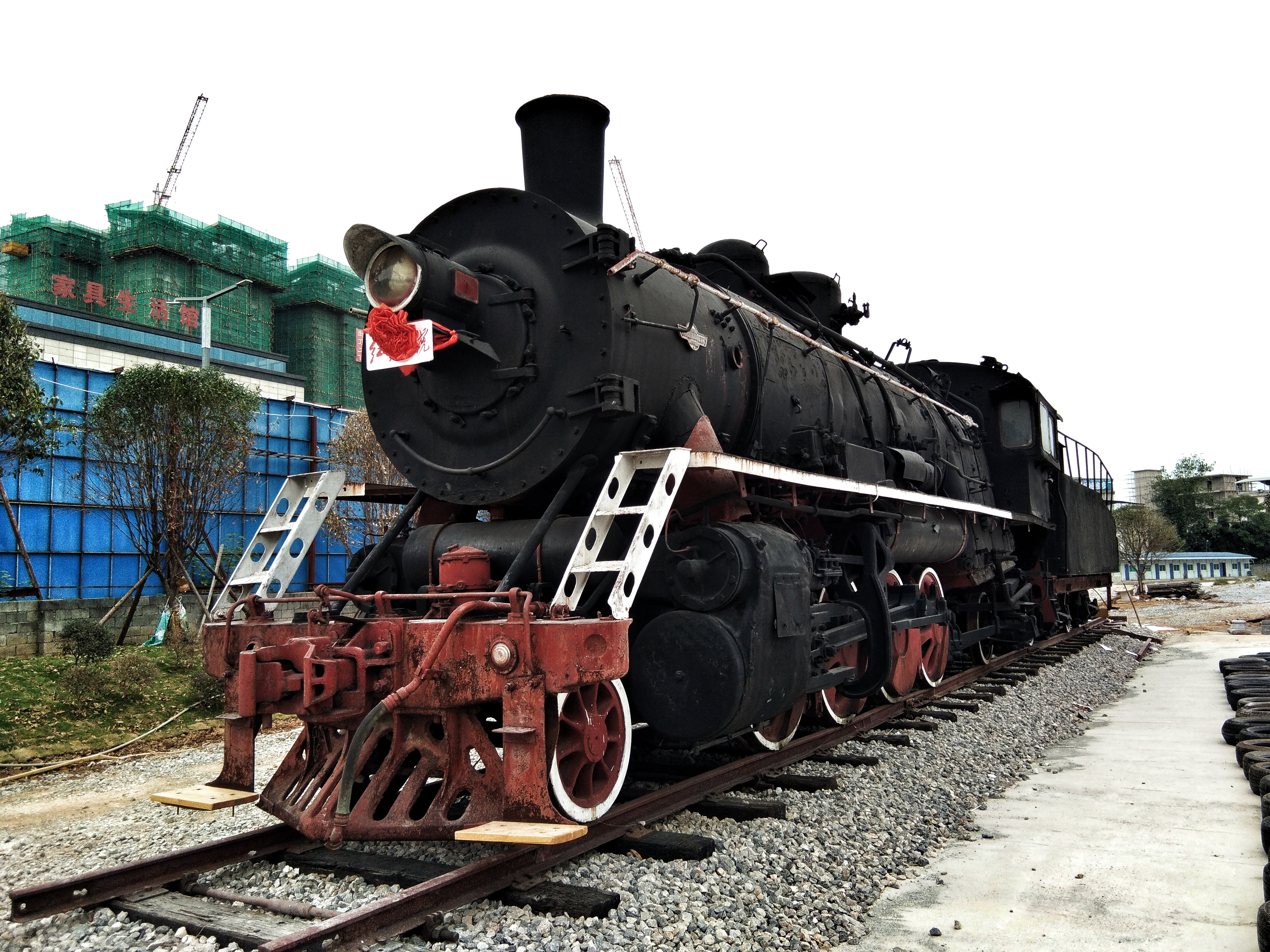
SY-0913 on display in Guilin, Guangxi, China

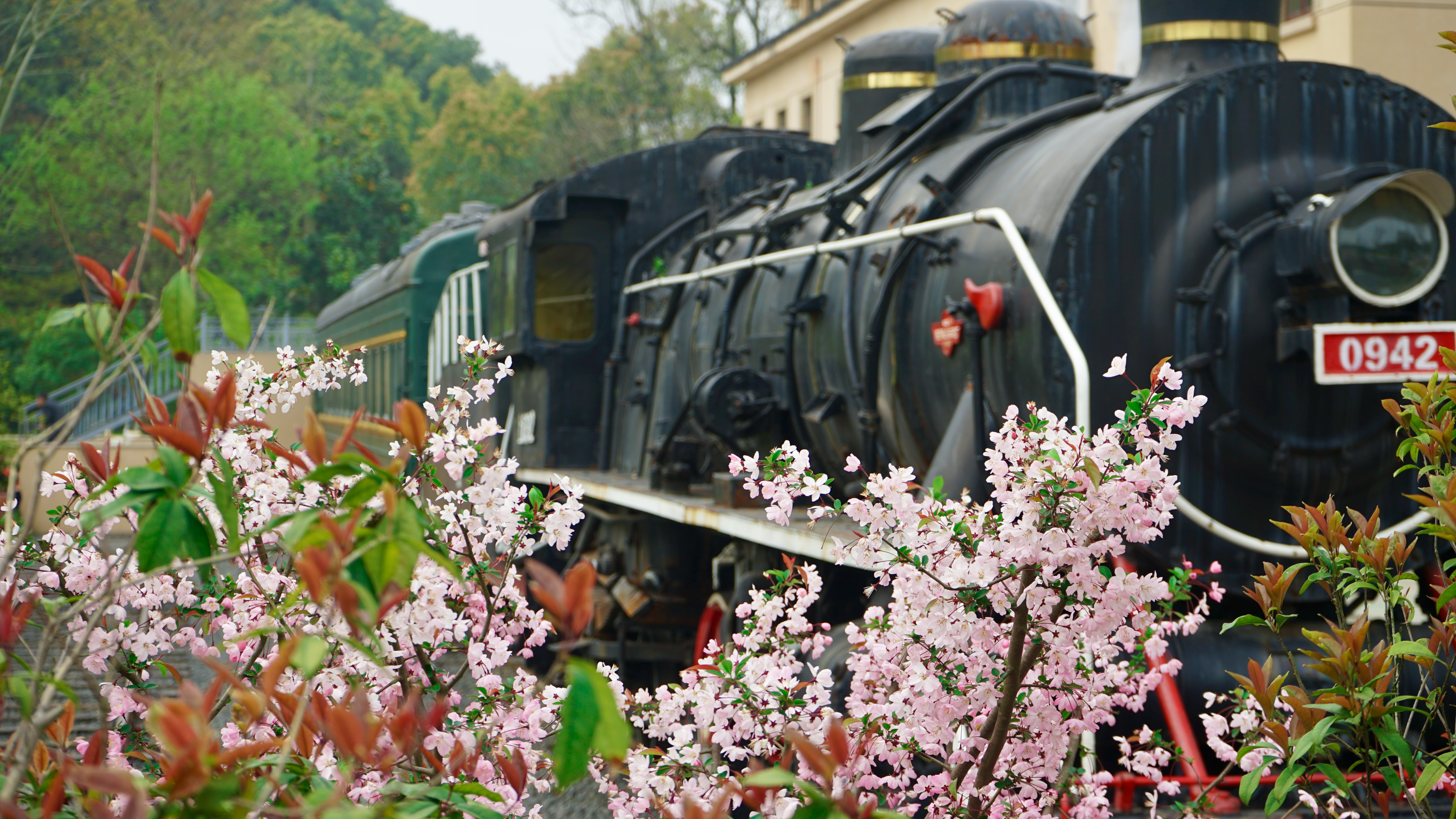
SY-0942 on display at the Xishan Park in Haining, Zhejiang, China

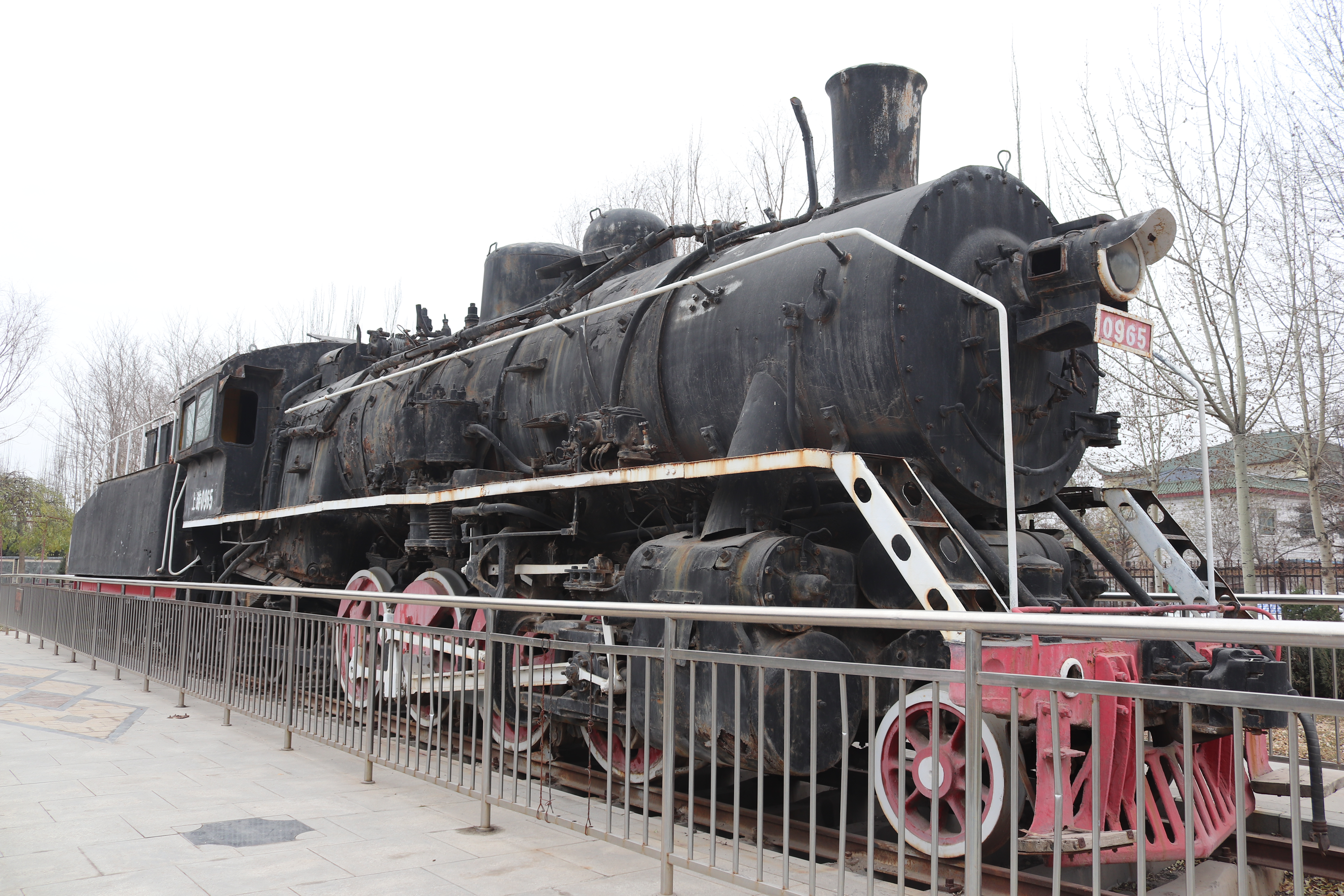
SY-0965 on display at the Baiyin Mine & Smelter Complex

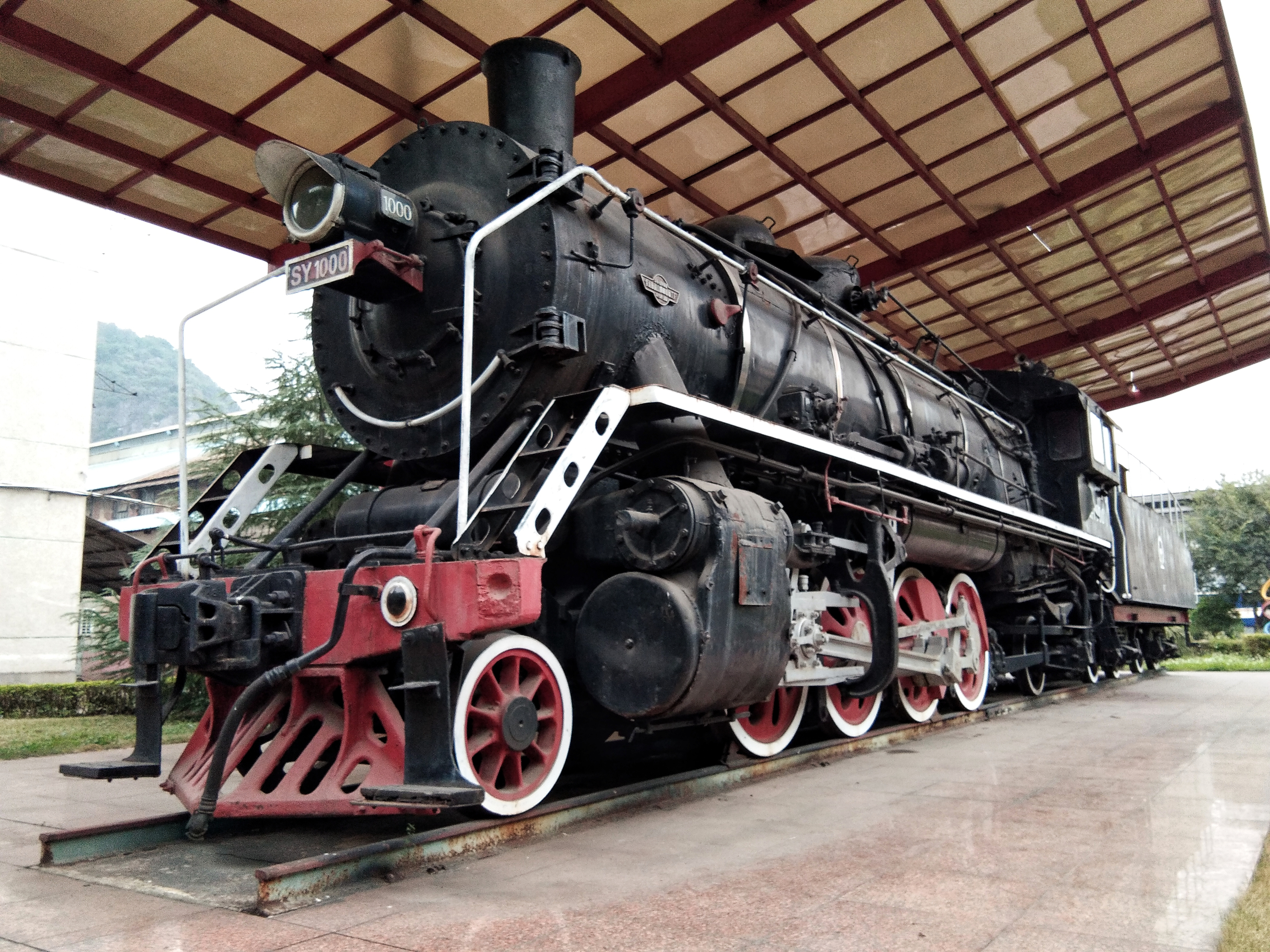
SY-1000 on display at the Liuzhou Locomotive and Rolling Stock Works

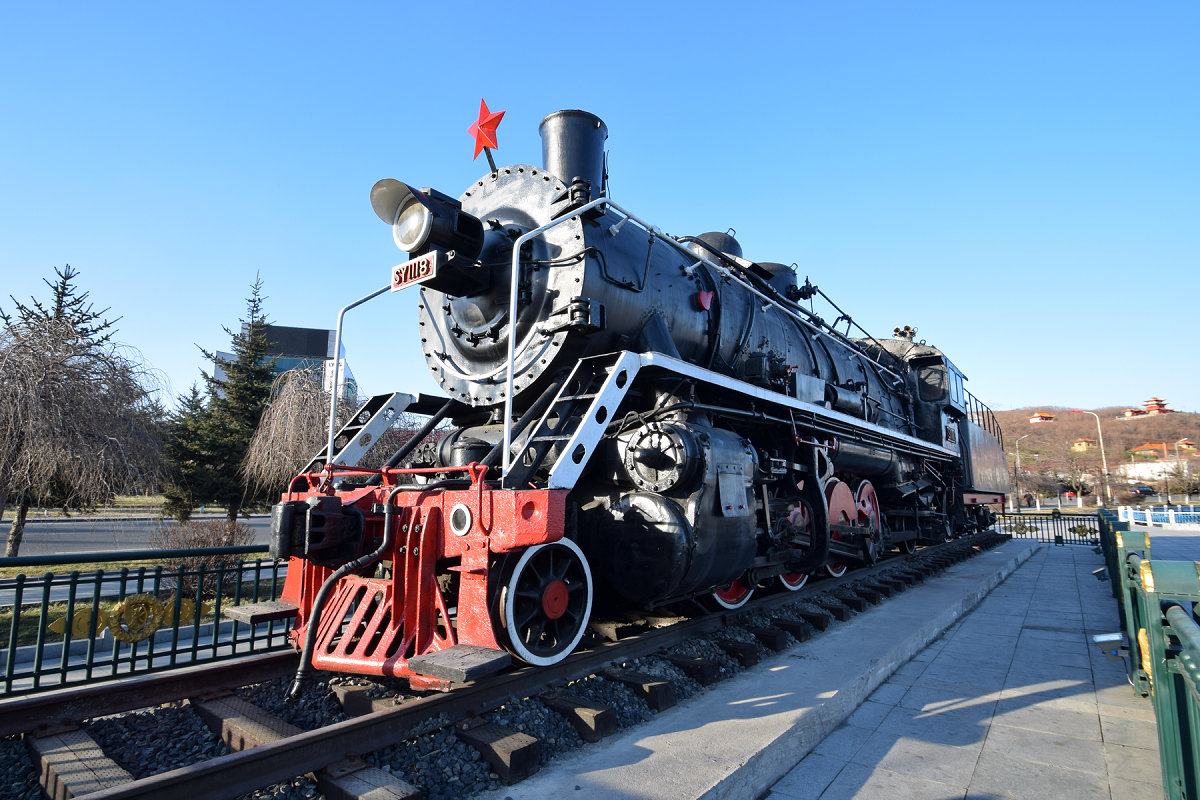
SY-1118 on display at Beihai Park, Suifenhe

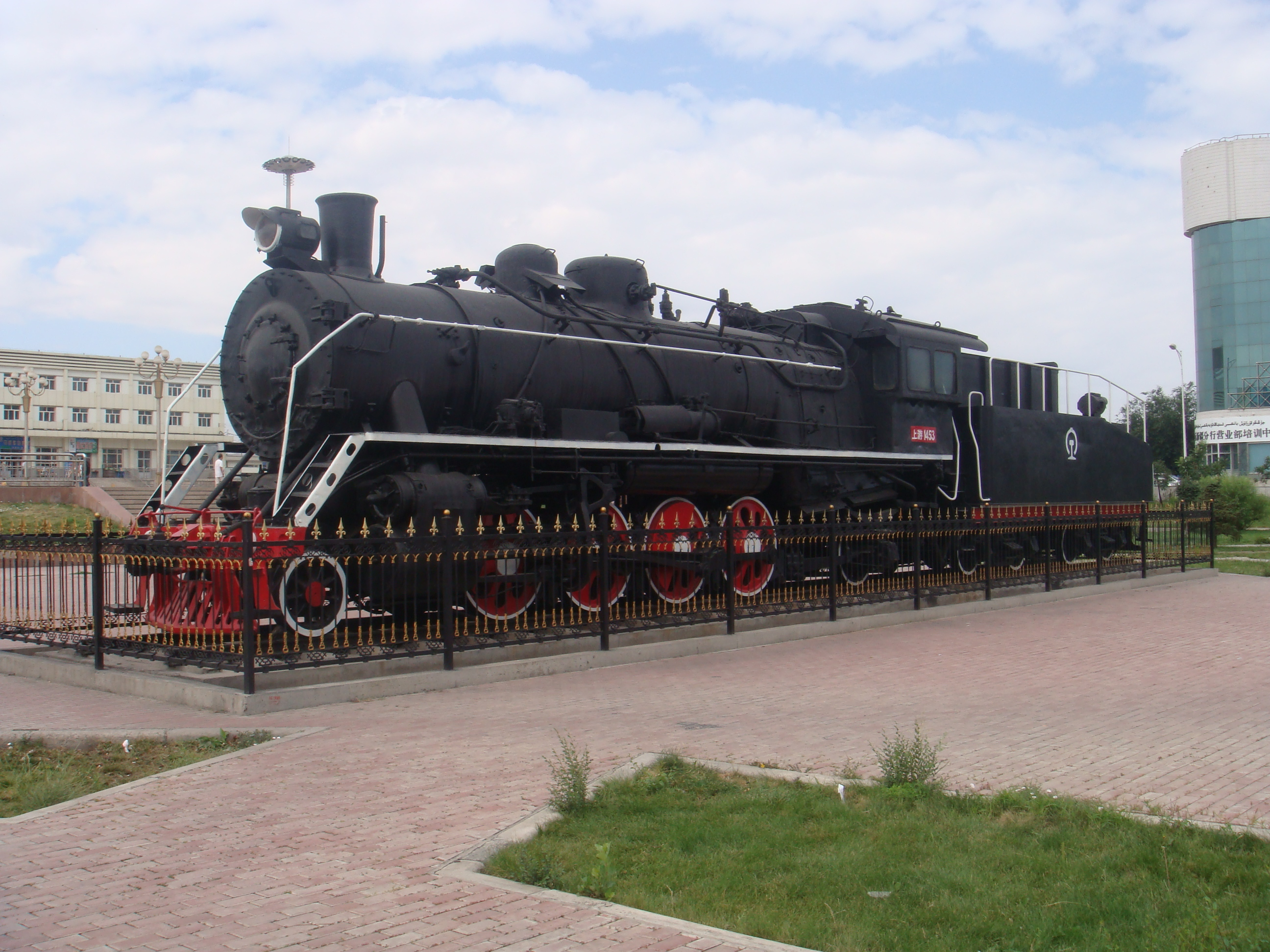
SY-1453 on display at the Urumqi West Station

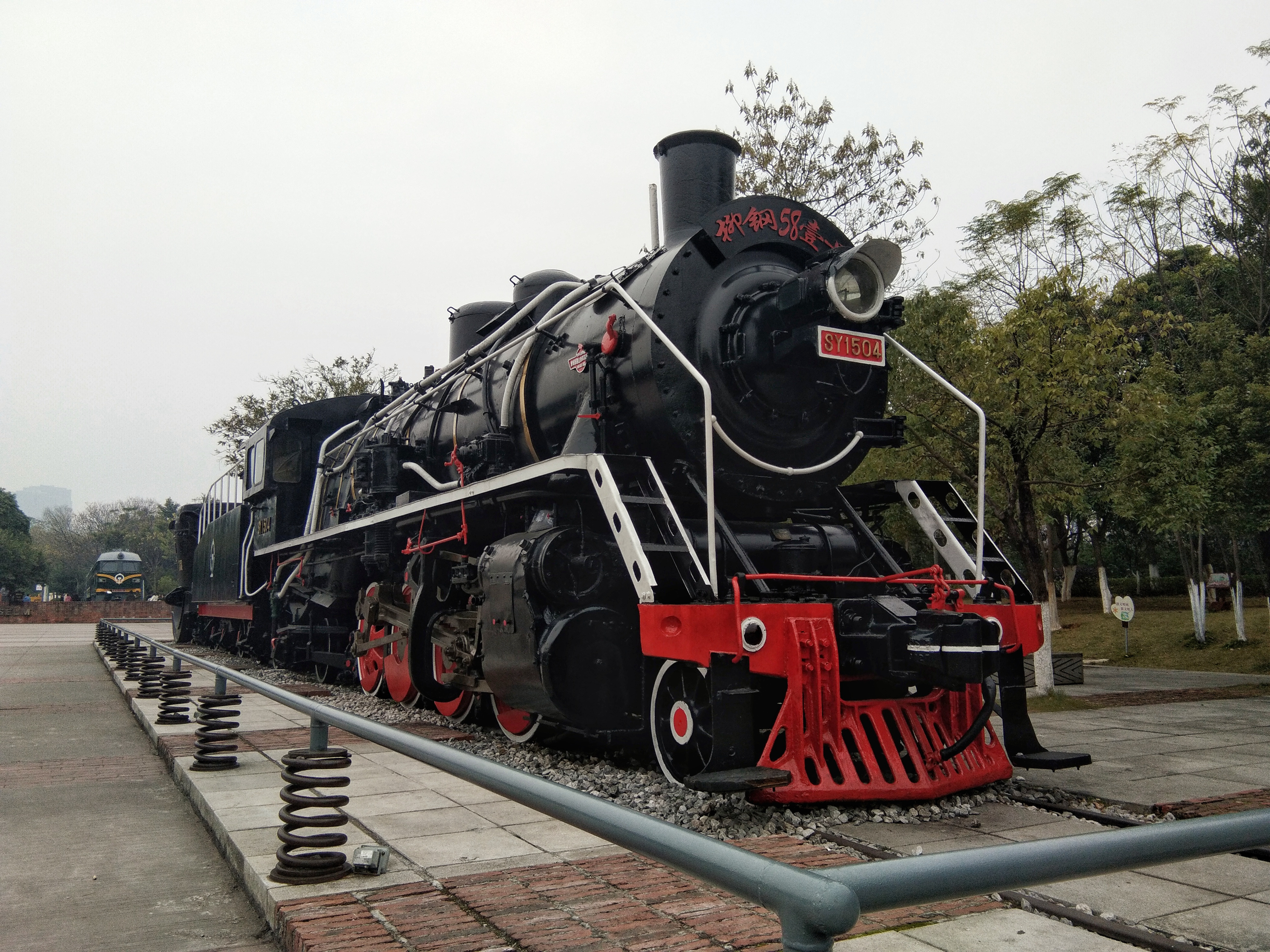
SY-1504 on display at the Liuzhou Industrial Museum

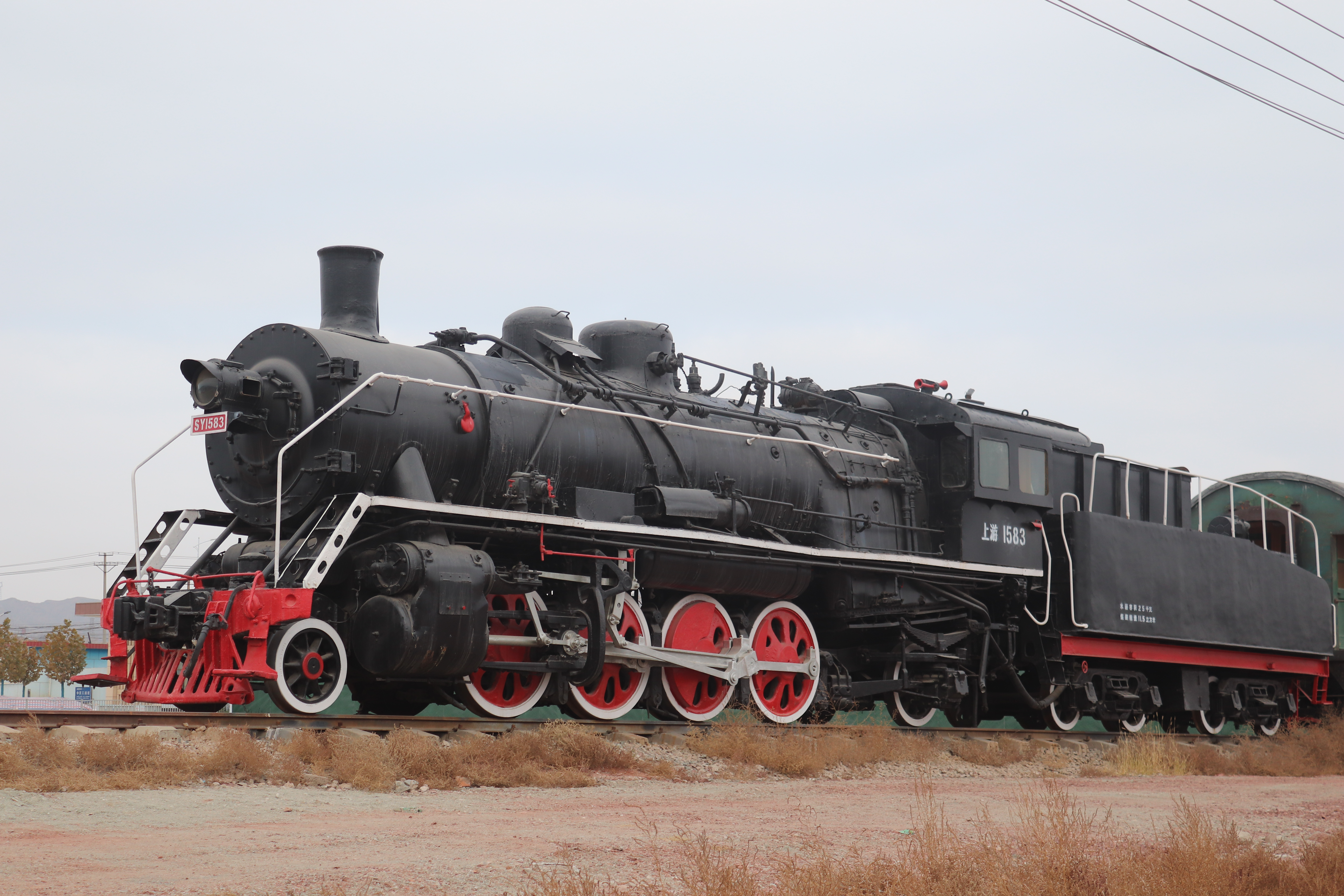
SY-1583 on display in Baiyin, China

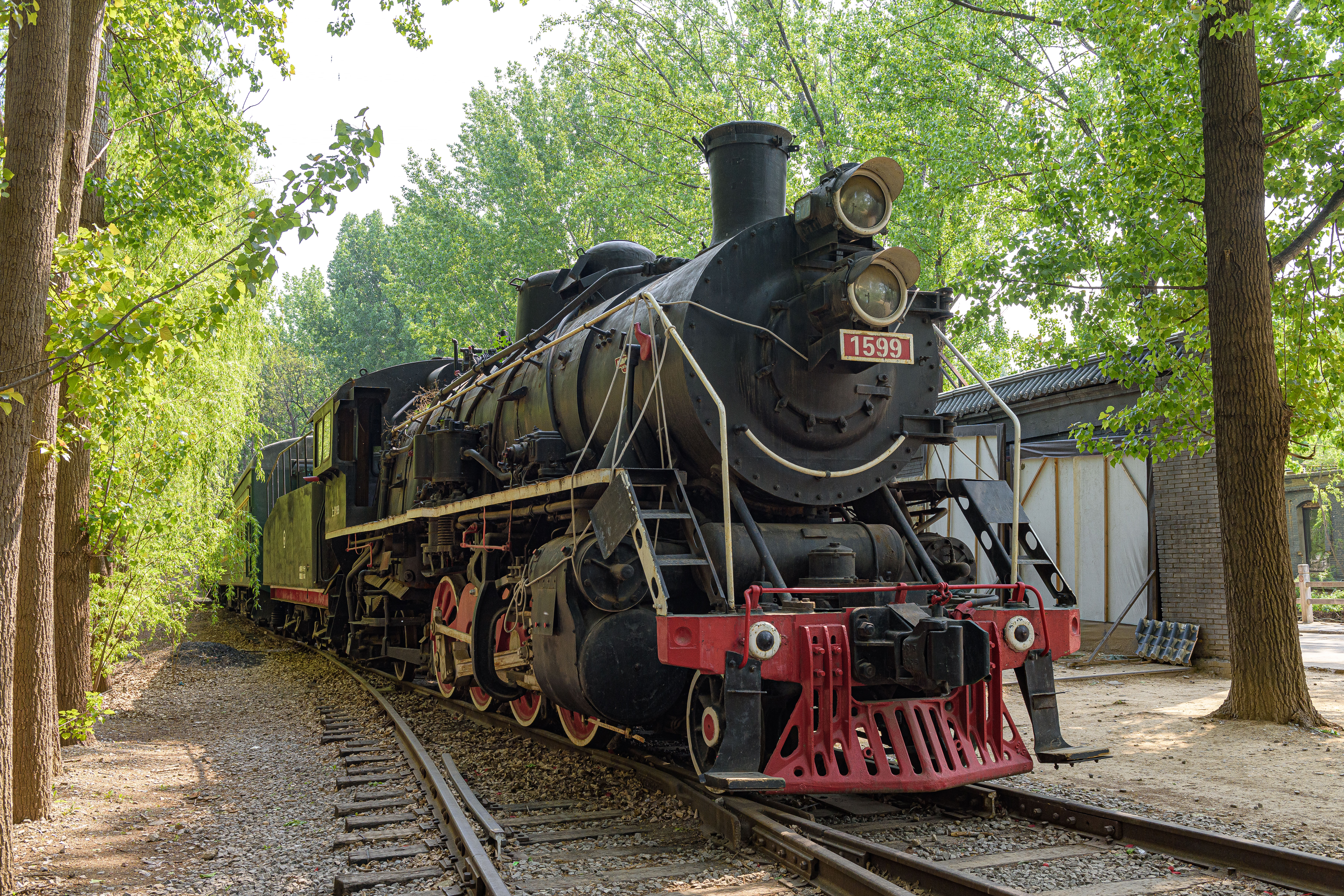
SY-1599 on display in Tangzitou, China

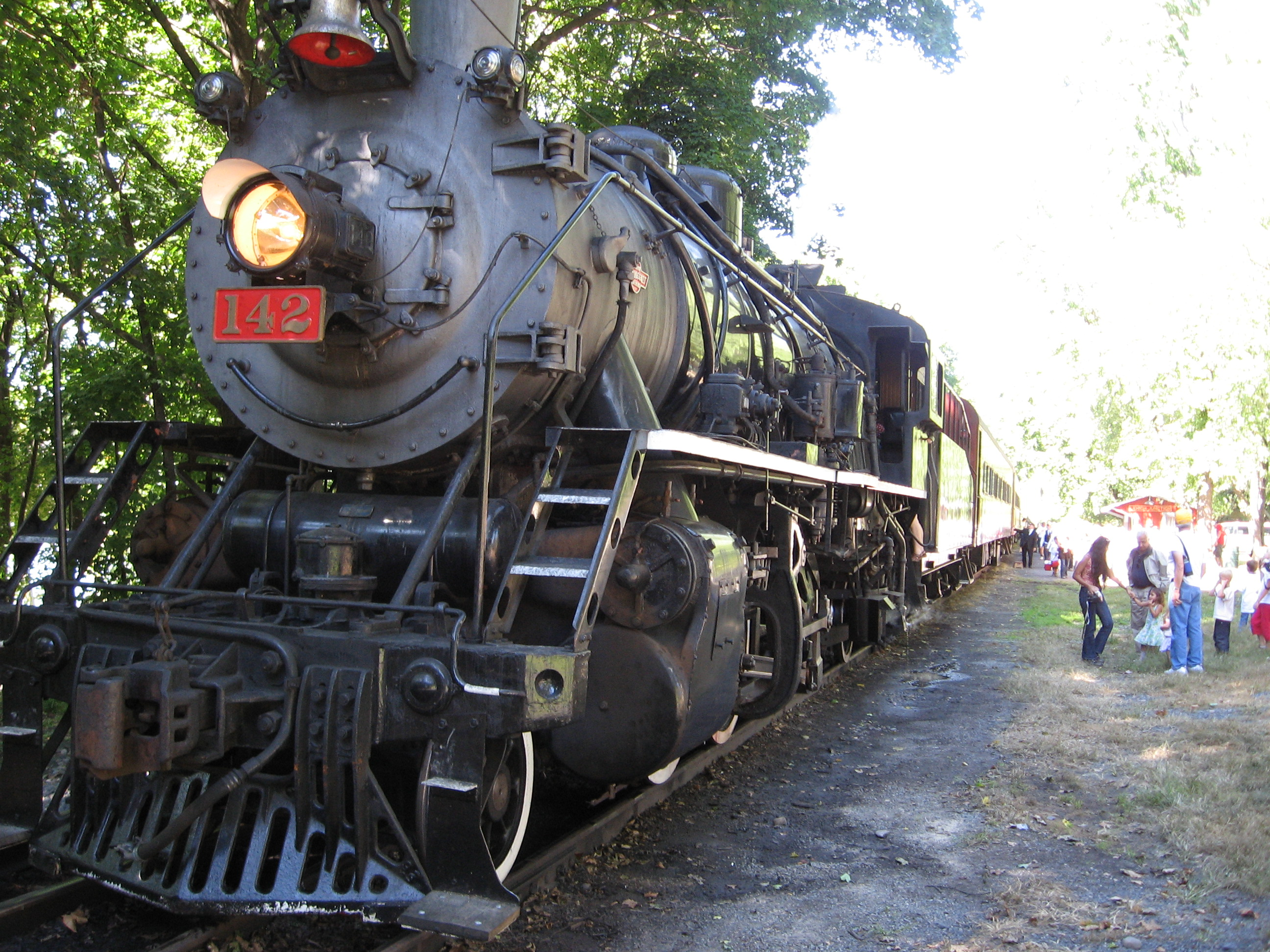
SY-1647M (No. 142) operating at the Belvidere and Delaware River Railway in Belvidere, New Jersey, in the United States

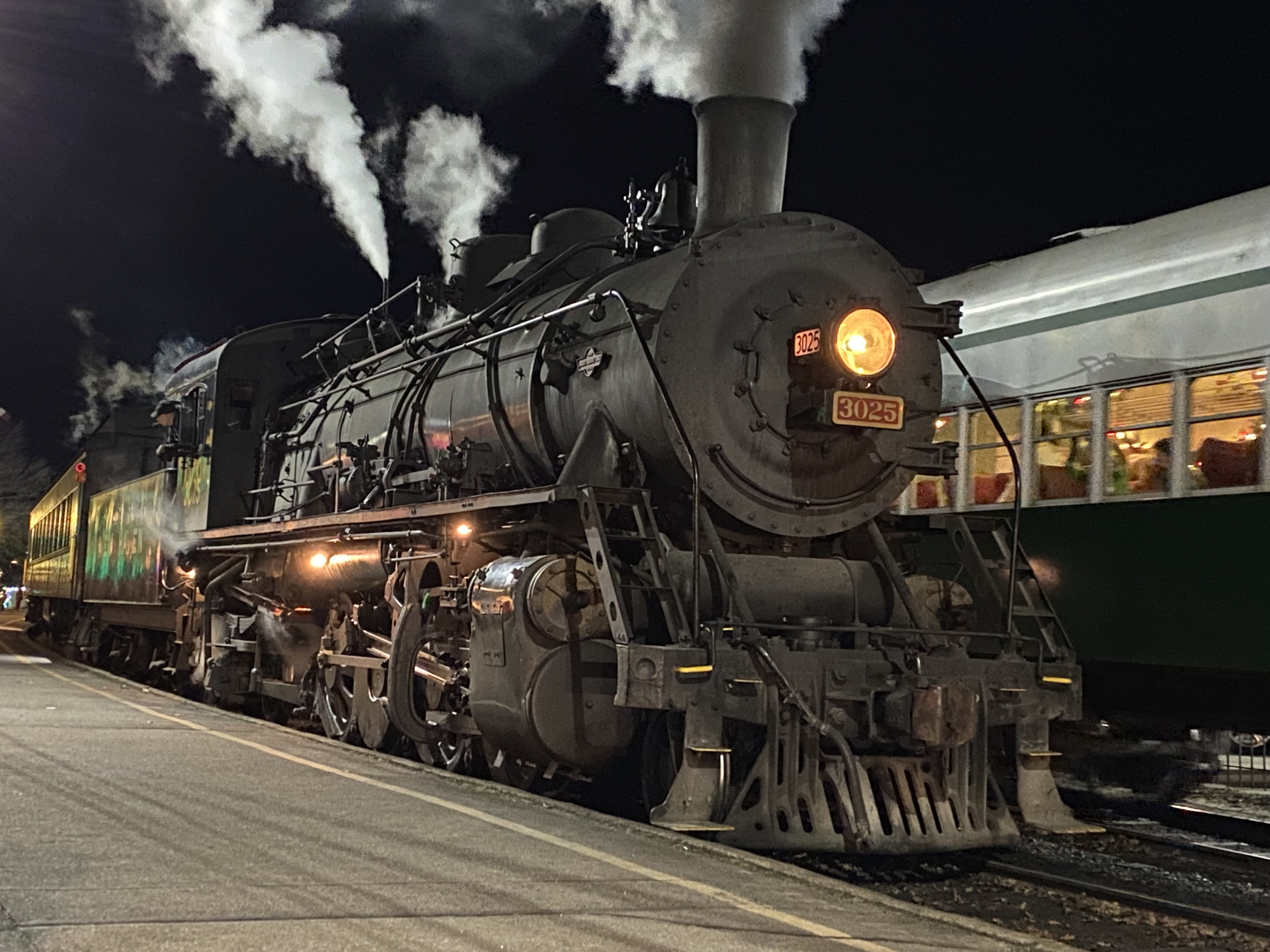
SY-1658M (No. 3025) operating at the Valley Railroad in Essex, Connecticut, United States

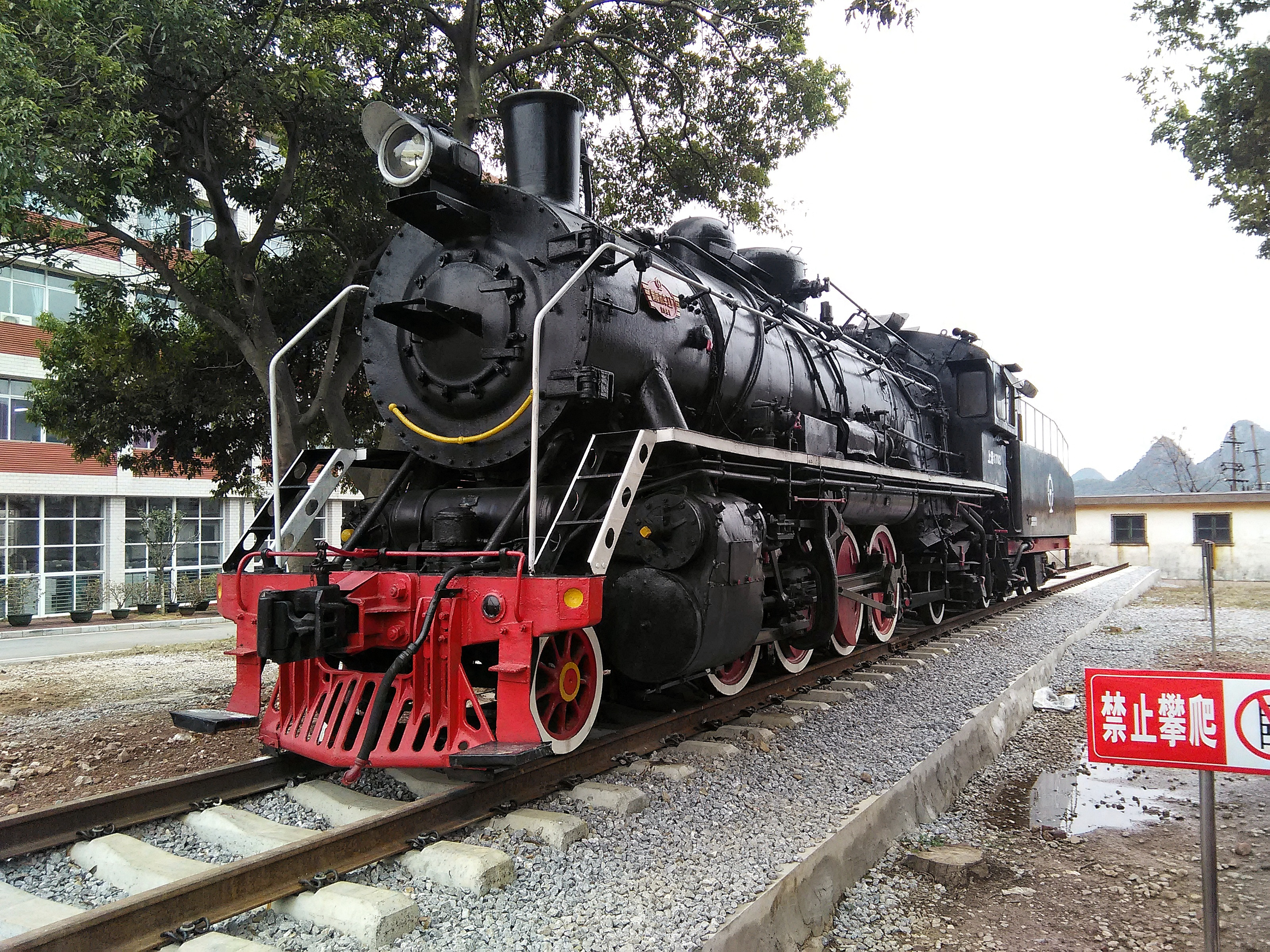
SY-1702 on display at the Guilin University of Aerospace Technology

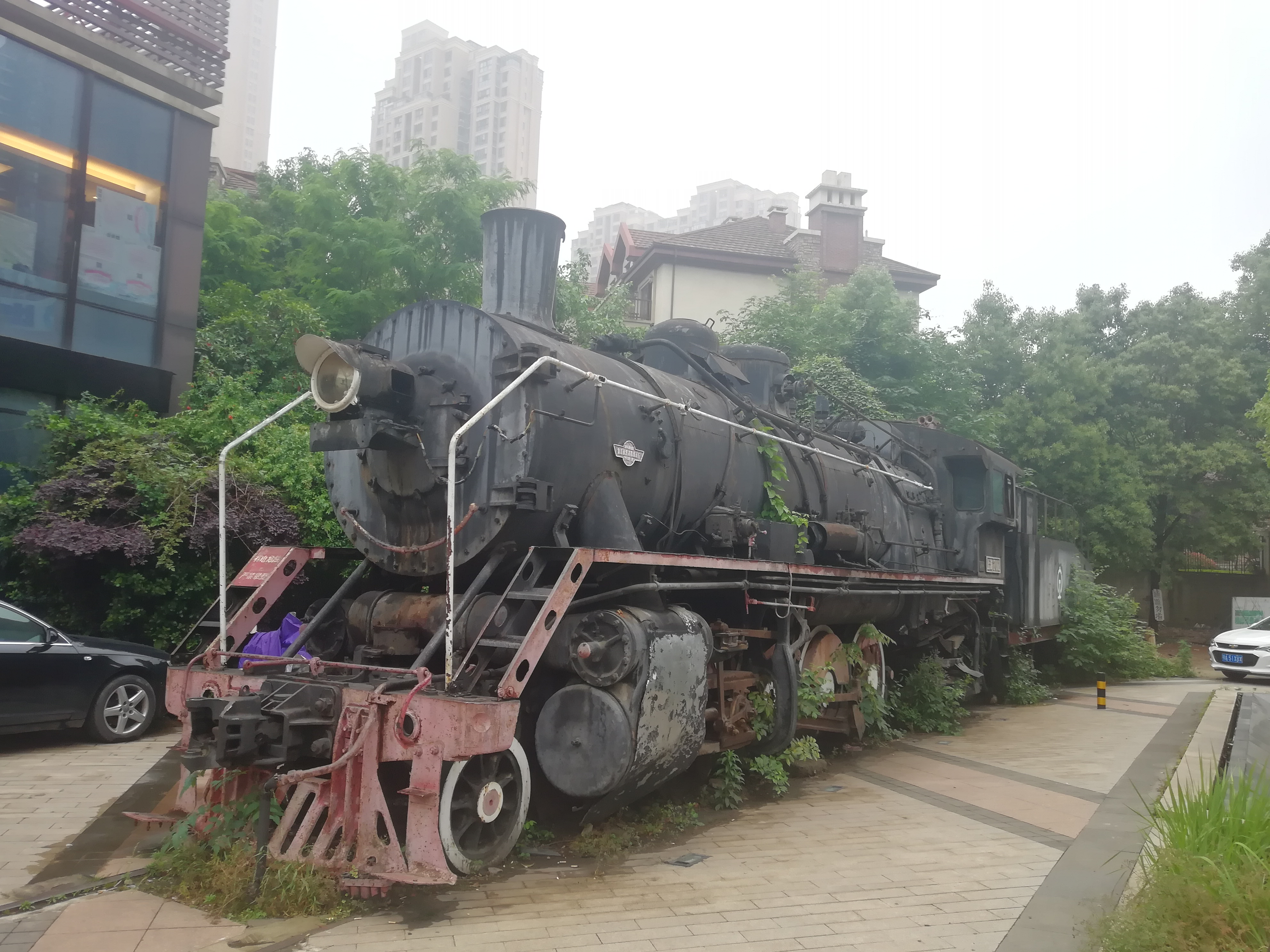
SY-2012 outside the defunct Wuhan Heavy Machine Tool Works in China

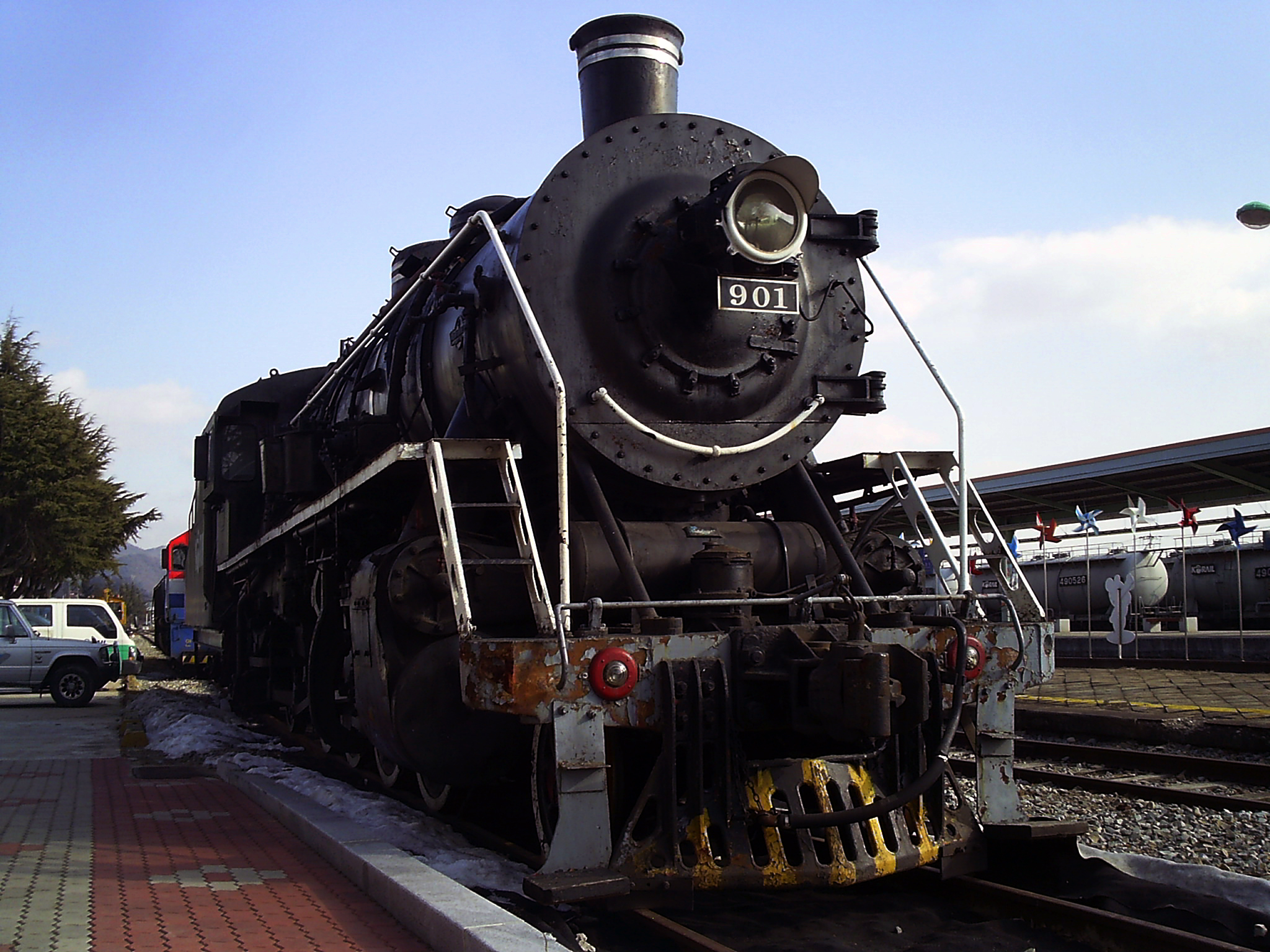
SY-3016 (KNR 901) on display in South Korea

== See also ==
- List of locomotives in China
- China Railways JS
- KORAIL 901

== Bibliography ==
- Gibbons, Robin (2016). Locomotives of China - The JF6 Family - The JF6, PL2, YJ and SY Classes. United Kingdom: Tynedale Publishing. ISBN 978-0-9934192-1-8.
- Miller, Max (2017). Along the Valley Line: The History of the Connecticut Valley Railroad. Wesleyan University. ISBN 978-0-8195-7737-5.
