= Battle of Bubiyan =

Naval engagement of the Gulf War

- Part of the Persian Gulf War
Date	29 January – 2 February 1991 (4 days)
Location	Persian Gulf
Result	Coalition victory: Iraqi Navy destroyed

Belligerents
Iraq	United States; United Kingdom; Canada

Commanders and leaders
(Ba'athist Iraq) Saddam Hussein (Ba'athist Iraq) Ali Hassan al-Majid	(United States) Norman Schwarzkopf (United Kingdom) Peter Billière (Canada) Kenneth Summers (United States) Ronald J. Zlatoper

Strength
5 Polnocny-class landing ships 7 fast attack craft 1 missile boat 2 Zhuk-class patrol boats 3 minelayers 3 minesweepers 2 salvage ships	Naval: 2 aircraft carriers (USS Ranger (CV-61) & USS Theodore Roosevelt (CVN-71)); 2 battleships (USS Wisconsin (BB-64) & USS Missouri (BB-63)) 2 destroyers (HMS Gloucester (D96) & HMS Cardiff (D108)); 1 frigate (HMS Brazen (F91)); Aerial: F/A-18 Hornets; CF-18 Hornets; A-6 Intruders; SEPECAT Jaguars; F-14 Tomcats; Westland Lynxs; SH-60 Seahawks; P-3 Orions

Casualties and losses
Sunk: 4 tank landing ships 7 fast attack craft 2 patrol ships 3 minelayers 3 minesweepers 2 salvage ships Damaged: 1 tank landing ship 1 missile boat	None
- 23 ships heavy damaged

The Battle of Bubiyan (also known as the Bubiyan Turkey Shoot) was a naval engagement of the Gulf War that occurred in the waters between Bubiyan Island and the Shatt al-Arab marshlands, where the bulk of the Iraqi Navy, which was attempting to flee to Iran, much like the Iraqi Air Force, was engaged and destroyed by Coalition warships and aircraft.

== Battle ==
The battle was completely one-sided. It consisted of 21 separate engagements over the course of 13 hours. Of the 22 Iraqi ships that attempted to escape, 21 were destroyed. Westland Lynx helicopters of the British Royal Navy, using Sea Skua missiles, were responsible for destroying 14 vessels (3 minesweepers, 1 minelayer, 3 TNC 45 Fast Attack Craft, 2 Zhuk-class patrol boats, 2 Polnocny-class landing ships, 2 salvage vessels, 1 Type 43 minelayer, and 1 other vessel).

A Canadian CF-18 Hornet fighter recorded an official victory at the beginning of the battle against the Iraqi Navy.

After the Bubiyan action, the Iraqi Navy ceased to exist as a fighting force, and left Iraq with very few ships, all in poor condition.
