= Morristown and Erie Railway =

Railway in New Jersey, US

Morristown & Erie Railway

Overview
- Headquarters: Morristown, New Jersey
- Reporting mark: ME
- Locale: northern New Jersey
- Dates of operation: August 28, 1903–present

Technical
- Track gauge: 4 ft 8 1/2 in (1,435 mm) standard gauge

Other
- Website: http://www.merail.com

Morristown & Erie Railway (reporting mark ME) is a short-line railroad based in Morristown, New Jersey, chartered in 1895 as the Whippany River Railroad. It operates freight rail service in Morris County, New Jersey and surrounding areas on the original Whippany Line between Morristown and Roseland. The M&E also operated the Maine Eastern Railroad from November 2003 to December 31, 2015, as well as the Morris County-owned Dover & Rockaway Branch, Chester Branch, and High Bridge Branches until June, 30, 2017.

== History ==
Today’s Morristown & Erie Railway can be traced back to the Whippany River Railroad that was formed on August 1, 1895 and quickly constructed between Morristown and Whippany. Interchange was established with the Delaware, Lackawanna & Western Railroad (DL&W) at Morristown. When the railroad defaulted on their bonds, paper mill owner Robert W. McEwan purchased the line from its creditors in 1896. Thanks to the numerous mills and other customers located along the line, the railroad enjoyed success and was looking to expand.

Seeking a connection with the Erie Railroad, McEwan chartered the Whippany & Passaic River Railroad in 1902 to build a line from Whippany to Essex Fells. Having access to two major railroads meant that McEwan's customers could enjoy competitive shipping rates from both connections. On August 28, 1903, the Whippany River Railroad and the Whippany & Passaic River Railroad were merged into the new Morristown & Erie Railroad.

M&E operated a modest passenger service, but automobile competition ended that in 1928. Freight business grew as the mills along the line kept switching crews busy.

=== Decline ===
The economic downturn associated with the Great Depression affected M&E. Frugal management kept the railroad viable through the worst of the 1930s. M&E would be the only U.S. railroad to rid itself of all debt during the era leading up to World War II. The railroad passed out of the McEwan family by 1943 and continued under new management. In 1952, the line received its first diesel, an S-4 from Alco.

When Andrew J. Cobb III assumed the presidency in 1961, many of the mills that had been steady customers began to shut down and consolidate. In 1960, DL&W and Erie Railroad merged to form Erie Lackawanna Railway, eliminating competition for shipping rates to M&E.

By the 1970s, the Northeastern railroad industry was in decline, and M&E looked to alternative revenue streams. The Morristown shop was leased to a locomotive rebuilder for a period of time, but it was not enough. The last paper mill had closed and carloads were down to a dozen per week. The railroad tried to invest its freight earnings into non-transportation areas, but these experiments failed. By 1978 the railroad filed bankruptcy.

=== Rebirth ===
A consortium of businessmen under the leadership of Benjamin J. Friedland purchased M&E in 1982, and immediately set to work on rebuilding the business as the Morristown & Erie Railway. Investments were made in track and repairing locomotives. Aggressive marketing helped bring traffic back to M&E. Friedland became a spokesperson for short line railroading, and was able to use these connections to help grow his business. He also had a strong sense of history, and is also credited with the opening of the Whippany Railway Museum in 1985.

Around this same time, Friedland helped orchestrate the purchase of the Chester Branch, and began operating the line under contract for the new owners on December 21, 1983. He also worked with Morris County officials to help purchase and operate remnants of the former Central Railroad of New Jersey Dover & Rockaway and High Bridge branches in 1986. The M&E also briefly operated the New Hope & Ivyland Railroad between 1989 and 1990.

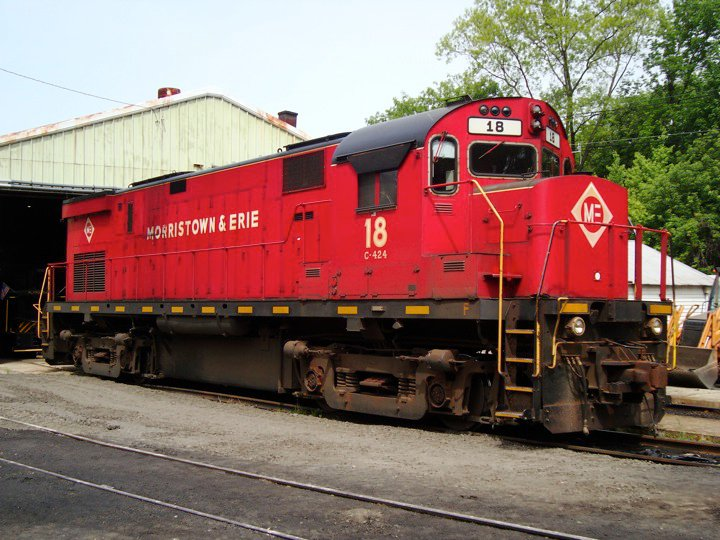
Morristown & Erie ALCO Century 424 No. 18 sits outside the Morristown shops.

While the M&E enjoyed modest growth throughout the 1980s, the railroad continued to seek out new opportunities for expansion. In 1995, Friedland negotiated a contract with Tosco (formerly ConocoPhillips, now Phillips 66) to be the contract operator for switching operations at Bayway Refinery in Linden, New Jersey. Bayway is one of the largest refineries on the East Coast.

The untimely 1998 death of Friedland shocked the company and short line industry that had come to respect him as a leader. In his 16 years at the helm of the M&E, he ascended from an obscure railroader to an industry icon. The New Jersey Short Line Railroad Association has an award named in his honor "for meritorious service to the short line industry."

The expansion of M&E continued after Friedland's death. In 2001, the M&E was selected to repair and operate the Linden-Cranford, New Jersey segment of the Staten Island Railway (SIRY) and Cranford-Summit, New Jersey segment of the former Rahway Valley Railroad (RVRR) as the newly created Union County Central Railroad. M&E entered into a 10-year agreement with Union County starting on May 15, 2002, for the rehabilitation and operation of these dormant freight lines. Conrail objected to the filing as M&E would need trackage rights over NJ Transit's Raritan Valley Line to travel between the ex-SIRY and ex-RVRR. Conrail had previously negotiated exclusive trackage rights with NJT back in 1984, but expressed willingness to work out a special arrangement with M&E should service resume. As of May 2012, M&E removed their equipment from the RVRR and SIRY, pursuant to the 10-year agreement with Union County.

The M&E would embark on its second foray into Pennsylvania, operating the SEPTA-owned Octoraro Railroad from July 1, 2003, to November 18, 2004. The line is currently operated by the East Penn Railroad.

On November 1, 2003, M&E took over operation of the Rockland Branch, a former Maine Central Railroad line now owned by the state of Maine. M&E created a subsidiary, the Maine Eastern Railroad, for its Maine operations. Seasonal excursion passenger trains were operated between Brunswick and Rockland, Maine. As of January 1, 2016, the operation of the line has been taken over by the Central Maine and Quebec Railway, which was later acquired by Canadian Pacific Railway in June 2020.

In 2009, the M&E took over contract operations of the Stourbridge Railroad (former Lackawaxen & Stourbridge), based in Honesdale, Pennsylvania. Passenger excursions continued to be sponsored by Wayne County. Operations were quietly suspended in 2012. Service return in 2015 is under the auspices of Myles Group.

Beginning on July 1, 2017, the Dover & Rockaway River Railroad (D&R) took over service and maintenance of the Chester, Dover & Rockaway and High Bridge Branches.

=== Current operations ===
To get between its lines, the M&E has trackage rights on New Jersey Transit's (NJT) Morristown Line and Montclair-Boonton Line west of West End (the junction at the west end of the Bergen Tunnel with NJT's Main Line); it uses the Main Line and the Bergen County Line to interchange with the New York, Susquehanna & Western Railway at Passaic Junction (rail yard). M&E locomotives are NJT cab-signal equipped and not considered to be foreign railroad power on NJT lines. Freight is interchanged with Norfolk Southern Railway (NS) at Lake Junction and with Conrail Shared Assets (CSAO) and CSX at Center Street, Harrison (east of Newark Broad Street on the NJT M&E main line).

In addition to freight service, M&E operates charter passenger service and rents railcars and conducts contract rebuilds of passenger cars. It also allows film production companies to rent equipment for filming. Recent films including Far from Heaven, Mona Lisa Smile and The Station Agent, as well as the reality television series The Next Food Network Star and some TV commercials have been filmed using M&E equipment. Scenes for Shontelle's music video for the song "Say Hello to Goodbye" were filmed on at M&E's Whippany passenger car storage facility in summer 2011.

In conjunction with Conrail Shared Assets, the M&E operates as the switching and terminal railroad at ConocoPhillips' Linden Terminal/Bayway Refinery)

== Lehigh Limited ==
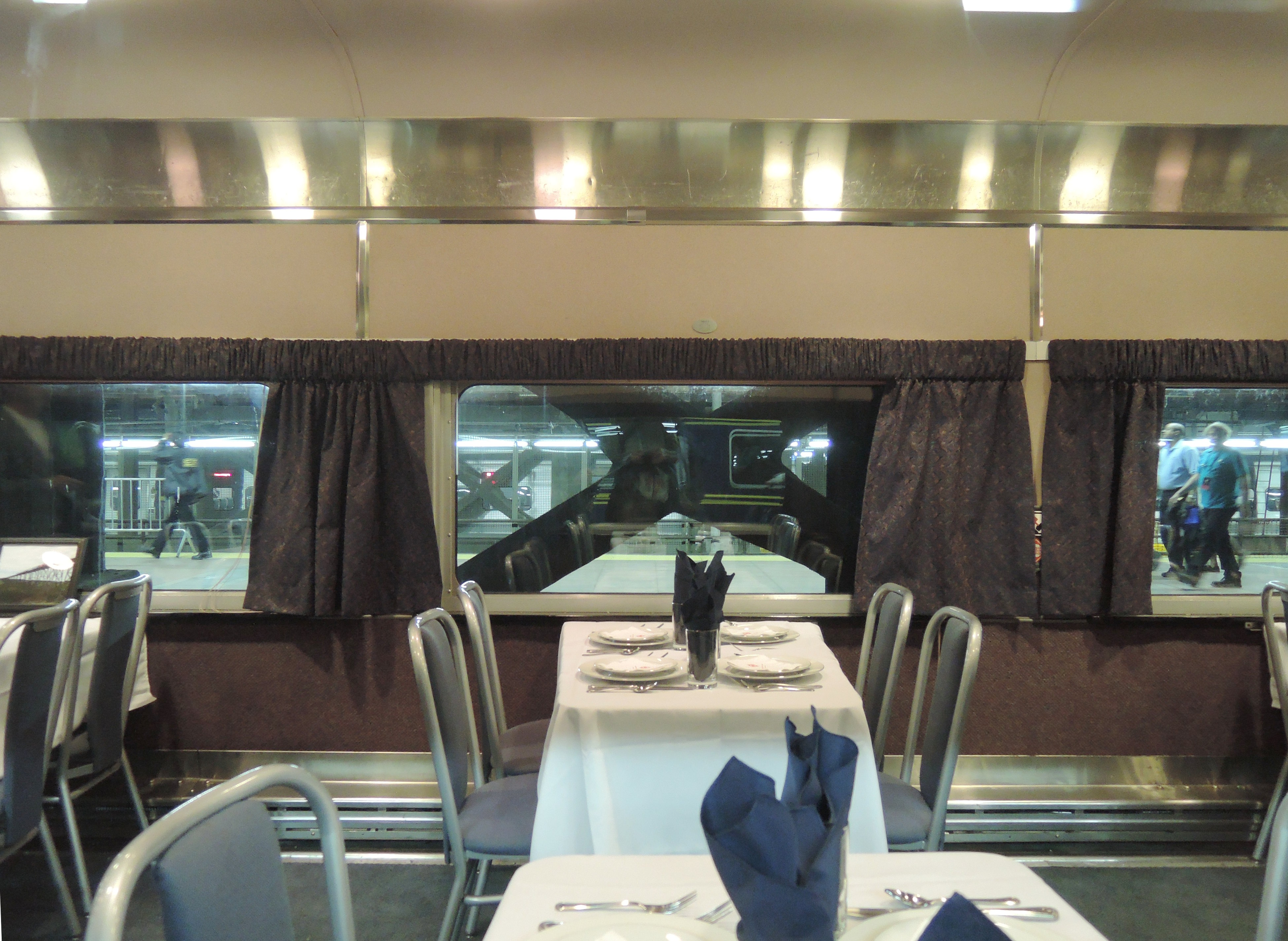
M&E dining car Birken

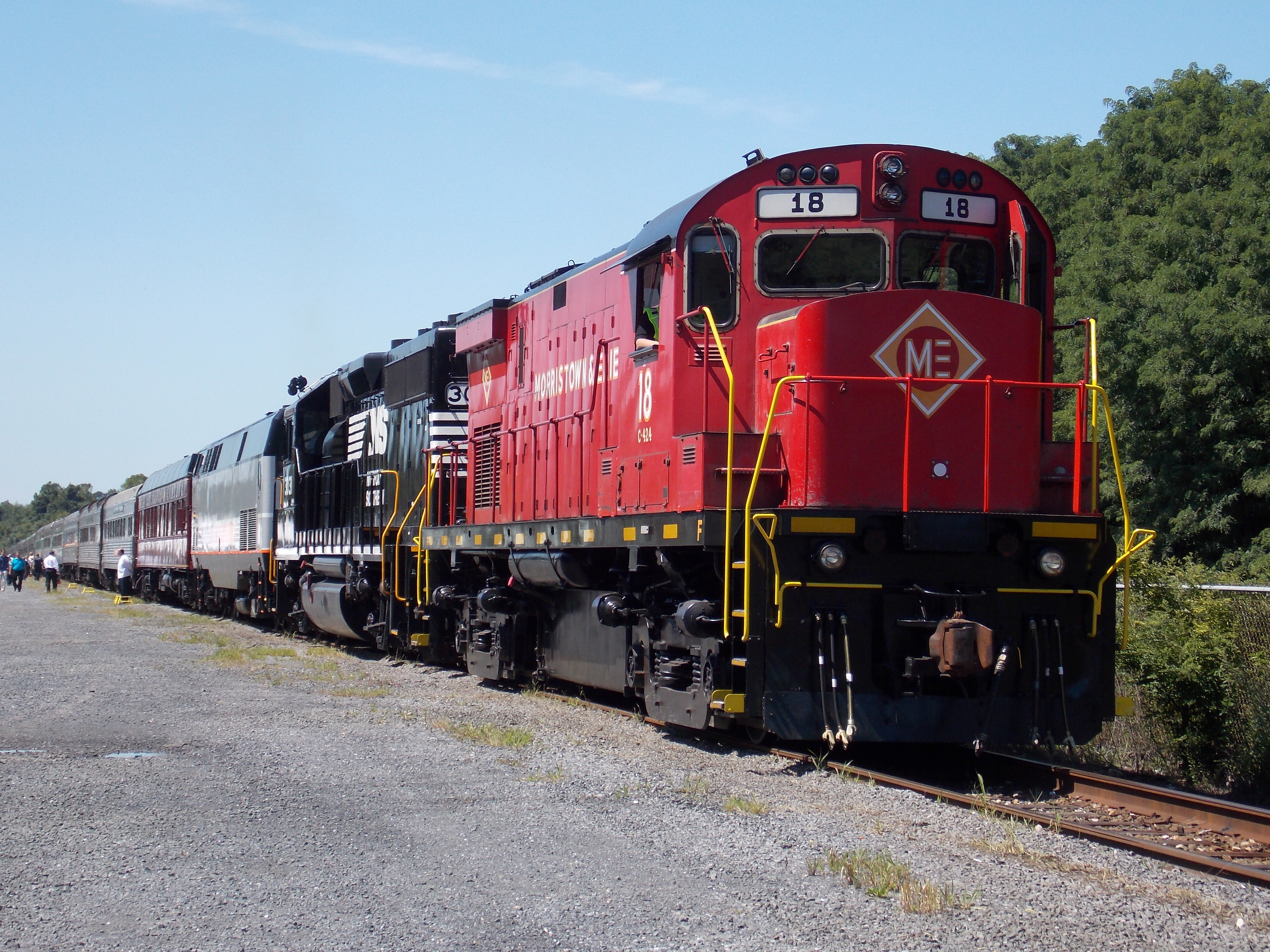
Lehigh Limited Motive Power in Bethlehem, PA

In May 2013 M&E announced its first public main line excursion in nearly three decades in the form of the Lehigh Limited operated in cooperation with NS and NJT operating from Hoboken Terminal to Bethlehem, Pennsylvania on August 24, 2013, to commemorate the railroad's 110th anniversary. The Lehigh Limited's two first class observation cars (the Kitchi Gammi Club and Babbling Brook) and the train’s snack car (the Birken) were on display at Grand Central Terminal (GCT) in New York City on May 11 and 12 during the Parade of Trains exhibit for GCT's centennial celebration.

== Active Branches ==
=== Whippany line ===
The Whippany line is M&E's original main line, in use since 1903 and with some portions dating back to 1895. The 9-mile (14.48 km) line runs between Baker Interlocking (connection with NJT's Morristown Line in Morristown, where M&E's main office, yard, and shop are located) northeast to Roseland in Essex County. The line is single track and has many grade crossings. It serves Cedar Knolls and Whippany in Hanover Township, and East Hanover and Roseland. The line currently ends east of Interstate 280 in Roseland. The outer half-mile has been out of service since customer Bobst Group, Inc. closed it doors. Track conditions have since degraded.

NJT has expressed interest in the line. In 2000 the agency placed the M&E under "projects to be defined/studied" for the year 2020.

==== Station list ====
Mile Post	Station	Notes
30.00	BAKER Interlocking	Junction with NJ Transit Morristown Line
0.00	Morristown	Company Headquarters, Mechanical Shop
2.00	Cedar Knolls	Jefferson Road Transload Facility
3.90	Whippany	Whippany Railway Museum, Troy Hills Bulk Transload Facility
6.26	East Hanover	
8.21	Roseland	
9.00	End of Track	Interstate 280 overpass

== Former branches ==
On July 1, 2017, the Dover and Rockaway River Railroad took over operation of the following three Morris County owned rail lines:

=== Chester Branch ===
The former DLW Chester Branch was extended in 1869 to Chester, New Jersey, to serve the local mining industry. A connection with the CNJ Chester Branch also existed. In the early 1950s, DLW abandoned the portion of its Chester Branch between the CNJ connection near Chester and Succasunna. In 1983, Conrail planned to abandon the remaining branch, but Holland Manufacturing and Westinghouse Elevator purchased the line to maintain rail service to their facilities. In 2009, Morris County acquired the Chester Branch, and M&E operated it under an agreement with the county. The branch runs from Lake Junction to Succasunna and connects with the High Bridge Branch at Ferromonte Junction. The line was rehabilitated in 2010–2011 with $5.8 million in federal stimulus funding. M&E's agreement with Morris County expired on June 30, 2017, and the Dover and Rockaway River Railroad subsequently took over operation of the branch.

Customers

- Holland Manufacturing, Succasunna (adhesives, paper products)
- Kuiken Brothers Company, Succasunna (lumber, building materials)

=== High Bridge Branch ===
The High Bridge Branch is a former Central Railroad of New Jersey line owned by Morris County. Morris County acquired the line in 1986, and it was subsequently operated by the Morristown & Erie Railway. In 2017, the Dover and Rockaway River Railroad received authority to operate the county-owned High Bridge Branch, along with the Chester Branch and Dover & Rockaway Branch. The line splits from the Chester Branch at Ferromonte Junction and runs southwest through Succasunna toward Flanders.

=== Dover & Rockaway branch ===
The Dover & Rockaway Branch is a former Central Railroad of New Jersey line. Morris County acquired the Dover & Rockaway Railroad from Conrail in 1986, and the Morristown & Erie Railway subsequently operated the line under contract with the county. The branch runs from D&R Junction in Wharton northeast through downtown Dover to Rockaway, ending along Green Pond Road in Rockaway Township, north of Interstate 80. The line passes through downtown Dover and Rockaway and has numerous street crossings. M&E's lease to operate the branch expired on June 30, 2017, and the Dover and Rockaway River Railroad subsequently took over its operation.

== Rahway Valley Railroad Revitalization ==
In 2001 the M&E was selected to repair and operate a rail line consisting of the New Jersey portion of the Staten Island Railroad between Linden and Cranford, and the former Rahway Valley Railroad between Cranford and Summit. Both sections are now known as the Rahway Valley Railroad. The New Jersey Department of Transportation owns the lines, and the County of Union administers the contract. As of late 2006, only the southern portion of the Rahway Valley Railroad has been restored, as the restoration of the northern portion from Summit to Cranford is being challenged in court and lacks sufficient county funding. The first M&E train ran on the southern portion of the line on July 13, 2005.

The intention was that Union County would work to revive freight service on the former Rahway Valley Railroad route from Summit to a connection with the former Staten Island Railway and Conrail at Cranford, New Jersey. The M&E would be the operator of any reactivated Rahway Valley line service from Summit to Cranford. Operation of the Rahway Valley line from Summit to Cranford would allow the M&E to access their operations at the Bayway Refinery in Linden via a more direct connection using trackage rights over the Morris and Essex lines and would provide freight service to customers along the Rahway Valley, which was abandoned in 1992. It would also allow interchange with the recently reactivated Staten Island Railway freight connection to New Jersey.

As of 2012, the M&E's contract with Union County to rehab the Rahway Valley between Summit and Cranford had expired and was not renewed.

== Morristown & Erie locomotive roster ==
#	Type	Built	Builder	Acquired	Disposition	Notes
1	4-4-0	12/1874	Altoona	6/19/1895	Late 1908, scrapped	Ex-PRR class D3 #137. Named "Whippany."
1	2-8-0	2/26/1908	Rogers #45087	2/26/1908	12/6/1917, sold	Sold to Toledo, St. Louis, & Western #136, became NKP class G4 #836 on 12/28/1922, retired 3/1933 and presumed scrapped
2	2-4-4T	10/1894	Rhode Island #3006	1/6/1908	1/1/1922, sold	Ex-Chicago South Side Elevated RR #226, exx-Chicago South Side Elevated #35. Sold to Hanover Brick Co. Scrapped 1936.
3	2-6-0	1870	Dickson #62	3/11/1908	11/1/1927, scrapped	Ex-DL&W #364, exx-DL&W #121
4	0-4-6T	1885	Rhode Island #1557	5/5/1911	12/2/1915, sold	Ex-New Haven #2114, exx-B&P #777, exxx-B&P #177, exxxx-B&P #24. Sold to General Equipment Corporation as trade-in for #6.
5	0-6-0	1880s	Altoona	11/17/1913	12/1913, scrapped	Ex-PRR class B3. Boiler found to be full of mineral deposits, scrapped immediately.
6	2-8-0	5/1898	Pittsburgh #1814	12/2/1915	10/1948, scrapped	Ex-P&LE #9314, exx-P&LE #135. Last day of operation 12/21/1945.
7	2-4-0	4/1905	Schenectady #30749	1/1/1917	4/9/1952, scrapped	Ex-Lake Champlain & Moriah #14. Received tender from #8 in 1936. Stored 1939.
8	2-8-0	1902	Baldwin #21178	5/28/1920	1936, scrapped	Ex-Hocking Valley #244. Stored 1933, tender given to #7 in 1936.
9	2-8-0	10/1904	Brooks #30134	10/20/1927	1/1947, Scrapped	ex-Rochester and Pittsburgh #328. Stored 9/1/1944.
10	2-8-0	11/1909	Pittsburgh #46770	8/22/1944	10/12/1955, scrapped	Ex-Monongahela class H5 #116
11	2-8-0	7/1912	Pittsburgh #51593	8/22/1944	10/12/1955, scrapped	Ex-Monongahela class H5 #131
12	2-8-0	7/1912	Pittsburgh #51592	7/13/1946	10/12/1955, scrapped	Ex-Monongahela class H5 #130
14	S-4	4/26/1952	ALCO-GE #79786	4/26/1952	3/1986, sold	Named "Mauritus Jensen." Renamed "T. G. Peterson" 7/1981. Sold to Linden Chlorine. Scrapped 1994.
15	RS-1	9/1944	ALCO-GE #72817	10/1963	7/1985, sold	Ex-USN #65-00078, assigned to Dahlgren Testing Station #6. Named "R.W. McEwan." Sold to Valley Railroad, resold to Central Connecticut Railroad, resold to A. J. Beliveau, parted out and scrapped mid-1990s at Central New England.
16	C-430	12/1967	ALCO #3494-05	8/1982	5/2001, sold	Ex-Conrail #2054, exx-Penn Central #2054, exxx-New York Central #2054. Out of service 1990 for cracked truck frame. Sold to WNY&P as #432.
17	C-430	12/1967	ALCO #3494-04	9/1983	5/2001, sold	Ex-Conrail #2053, exx-Penn Central #2053, exxx-New York Central #2053. Out of service by end of 1999. Sold to WNY&P as #431.
18	C-424	9/1964	ALCO #3382-01	12/1983	4/28/2018, sold	Ex-TP&W #800, Sold to Illinois Railway Museum.
19	C-424	9/1964	ALCO #3382-02	12/1983	4/3/2017, sold	Ex-TP&W #801. Sold to Tri-State Railway Historical Society.
20	SW-1500	10/1966	EMD #32156	8/1996	OOS - Electrical Work	Ex-CRL #0100, exx-ACWR #1500, exxx-CSXT #1315, exxxx-RF&P #91
21	RS-1	12/1954	ALCO #80853	1/2001	OOS	Named "R. W. McEwan." Ex-Pook Valley #21, exx-Ware River #21, exxx-Mass. Central #21, exxxx-MDDE #21, exxxxx-Soo #350
22	GP9	9/1954	EMD/M-K #19875	3/18/2000	OOS	Ex-Morrison-Knudsen #5001, exx-UP #278. Rebuilt as TE50-4S with Stelzer engine by M-K, reverted to GP9 with EMD engine by M&E.
23	GP7u	8/1952	EMD/ATSF Cleburne Shops #16385	8/5/2014	OOS - Wheel Work	Ex-MM&A #23, exx-BAR #23, exxx-ATSF #2175, exxxx-ATSF #2741
24	GP15-1	7/1977	EMD 767038-14	9/7/2023	In service - Morristown.	Ex-UPY 603, Exx-MP 1603
25	GP15-1	9/1979	EMD 787183-6	9/7/2023	In service - Morristown.	Ex-UPY 620, Exx-MP 1620
26	MP15DC	6/1977	EMD #767051-7	8/2016	In Service - Morristown	Ex-NS 2354, exx-SOU 2354. Won in Norfolk Southern's August 2016 locomotive auctions. Painted into semiquincentennial colors in June 2026.
21	GP7u	12/1952	EMD/ATSF Cleburne Shops #17706	8/5/2014	OOS	Ex-MM&A #21, exx-BAR #21, exxx-ATSF #2023, exxxx-ATSF #2845
79	GP9	6/1954	EMD #19556	8/5/2014	OOS	Ex-MM&A #79, exx-BAR #79
100	GP7	11/1950	EMD #9941	8/5/2014	OOS	Ex-MM&A #100, exx-LMS #100, exxx-BAR #68, exxxx-BAR #568
2378	MP15DC	10/1979	EMD #787185-5	8/2016	5/2019, Sold	Ex-NS 2378, exx-SOU 2378. Won in Norfolk Southern's August 2016 locomotive auctions. Subsequently sold in November 2017.
2408	MP15DC	4/1982	EMD #817015-5	8/2016	8/2018, Sold	Ex-NS 2408, exx-SOU 2408. Won in Norfolk Southern's August 2016 locomotive auctions. Sold to GATX in August 2018.

== Morristown & Erie rolling stock roster ==
#	Type	Built	Builder	Notes
1	Caboose	1899	Lackawanna Railroad shops	Former DL&W, later BR&W. At Whippany Railway Museum, owned by United Railroad Historical Society of NJ
4	Caboose	10/1948	International Car Co.	Former NYSW 0112, restored to NYSW 0112, at Whippany Railway Museum
5	Caboose			Maine Eastern (MERR), former Soo Line
100	Caboose	1973		Former Soo Line
233	Coach "Troy Hills"	1978-79	Pullman Standard	Former MBTA
1002	Coach "Magnolia"	1946	Budd	Former AMTK 5627, SCL, ex-SAL. Maine Eastern Fleet
1003	Coach "Ash"	1947	Budd	Former AMTK 5640, ex-PC and NYC. Maine Eastern Fleet
1004	Coach "Elm"	1947	Budd	Former AMTK 5641, ex-PC and NYC. Maine Eastern Fleet
1703	Comet I coach	1970	Pullman Standard	Former NJ Transit, ex-EL/NJDOT 1722
1715	Comet I coach	1973	Pullman Standard	Former NJ Transit, ex-EL/NJDOT 1778
1716	Comet I coach	1970	Pullman Standard	Former NJ Transit, ex-EL/NJDOT 1747
1743	Comet I coach	1970	Pullman Standard	Former NJ Transit, ex-EL/NJDOT 1754
1748	Comet I coach	1973	Pullman Standard	Former NJ Transit, ex-EL/NJDOT 1781
1775	Boxcar (U.S. Marine Corps/Toys For Tots)	10/1965		Former PRR
1800	Baggage car	1957	Pullman Standard	Former Amtrak Vermonter (AMTK 1801), built for Northern Pacific (NP). Scrapped 1/2012
1802	Baggage car	1953	St. Louis Car	Former Amtrak Vermonter (AMTK 1802), built as U.S. Army (USAX) ambulance 89544.
1851	Baggage car	1953	St. Louis Car	Former Amtrak Adirondack (AMTK 1851), built as U.S. Army cafeteria lounge 59566. Scrapped 2/2018.
1852	Baggage car	1956	American Car & Foundry	Former Amtrak Ethan Allen (AMTK 1852), built as Union Pacific (UP) 5728.
1853	Baggage car	1953	St. Louis Car	Former Amtrak Adirondack (AMTK 1853), built as U.S. Army (USAX) ambulance 89542.
1854	Baggage car	1958	National Steel Car	Former Amtrak Ethan Allen (AMTK 1854), formerly VIA 9660 and built as CN 9225.
2004	Business car "Ohio River"			Former Louisville & Nashville
2006	Parlor car "Alexander Hamilton"	1/1952	Budd	Former PRR Parlor 7152
800081	Parlor car "Morris County"	12/1946	Budd	Former NYC coach 2936
800763	Diner-Lounge "Birken"	1954	Canadian Car & Foundry	Former Canadian National coach 5437

== See also ==
- Morristown and Erie Railroad Whippany Water Tank
