= List of New Jersey railroad junctions =

This is a List of New Jersey railroad junctions, present and past.

Junction	Systems	Lines	Location	Current status
Aldene Junction	CNJ, LV, CSAO, NJT,	CNJ Main Line, LV Terminal Branch, NJT Raritan Valley Line	Aldene 40.659219°N 74.279624°W	Opened May 1, 1967. Currently in service for NJT's Raritan Valley trains. At the time of completion (and along with the Hunter Connection), it allowed CRRNJ traffic to terminate in Newark Penn Station, rather than its own Communipaw Terminal. This saved the floundering CNJ of the large operating costs of their terminal and ferry service. Reading Company's Crusader that once terminated in Communipaw also used the junction to terminate in Penn Station. A shuttle between Cranford and Bayonne, known as "the Scoot," operated until August 6, 1978, after which the right-of-way between Aldene and Bayonne was effectively abandoned. The CRRNJ Newark Bay Bridge was demolished in stages after the US Coast Guard deemed it too great a hazard to maritime traffic. The junction and the Aldene-Elizabethport right-of-way is currently owned and controlled by CSAO.
Alloway Junction	P-RSL, WJ&S	Salem Branch/Quinton Branch	Alloway; 39.580092°N 75.373231°W	Quinton Branch is abandoned
Andover Junction	DL&W, L&HR	DL&W Sussex Branch/LHR main	Andover; 40.997157°N 74.745705°W	All lines now abandoned, DLW Sussex Branch abandoned September 30, 1966, trackage removed 1967–1977, LHR Mainline abandoned 1985, trackage removed 1989
Anglesea Junction	PRR, WJ&SS, P-RSL	WJ&SS Cape May Branch	Burleigh; 39.050571°N 74.856970°W	Abandoned
Atsion Junction	CNJ	CNJ Southern Div.	Atsion; 39.737229°N 74.725701°W	Branch to Atco abandoned
Baker Junction	NJT, EL, DL&W	Morristown and Erie Main	Morristown; 40.799299°N 74.475425°W	Junction in Morristown, New Jersey between New Jersey Transit's Morris and Essex line and the Morristown and Erie (M&E) main line. It has been fully operational for over 100 years and currently remains in service to provide connections for the shortline M&E to the national rail network.
Barnegat City Junction	TRR, PRR	Long Beach Railroad	Ship Bottom; 39.649896°N 74.175466°W	All abandoned
Bay Head Junction	CNJ, PRR, NJT	New York and Long Branch Railroad/North Jersey Coast Line, Long Branch and Barnegat Bay Railroad	Bay Head; 40.076805°N 74.046113°W	PRR abandoned Bay Head Jct.-Toms River portion of its Camden-Toms River-Bay Head Jct. Line in 1946 after the bridge over Barnaget Bay burned.
Bergen Junction	ERIE, DLW, EL, NJT	DLW Boonton Branch (NJT Main Line), Erie Main Line (NJT Bergen County Line)	Jersey City; 40.751708°N 74.069886°W	Junction no longer exists. Was created to shift Erie's Main Line operations from Pavonia Terminal to Lackawanna Terminal. Was removed with creation of Secaucus Junction, which shifted NJT Bergen County Line junction with NJT Main Line north.
Bound Brook Junction	LV, CNJ, RDG	Junction of former Lehigh Valley Railroad, Central Railroad of New Jersey main lines and Reading Railroad Port Reading Branch	Bound Brook; 40.560536°N 74.531243°W	A junction still exists, but is rarely used since the lines now serve passenger and freight traffic separately. The original Bound Brook Jct (where the Reading line to Philadelphia met the CNJ main line 1.6 miles west of Bound Brook station) was removed by Conrail years ago. The former LV main line is now operated by Conrail, CSX and Norfolk Southern and used for long distance and local freight services. The former CNJ main line is now NJ Transit's Raritan passenger line. A branch line called the Port Reading Secondary, formerly called the Port Reading Railroad (RDG), originates at Bound Brook Junction and crosses northern Middlesex County to connect with the Chemical Coast line in Eastern Middlesex County. The Port Reading Secondary has been refurbished and upgraded by its new owner CSX as a second route to Oak Island Terminal in Newark, NJ (via the Chemical Coast Line) and other points on the CSX system. The line now handles much more freight traffic than it handled in the later 20th Century under Conrail, including long haul double-stack container freight traffic.
Bowentown Junction
Branchville Junction	DLW	Sussex Branch	Lafayette; 41.082298°N 74.700877°W	Abandoned 1934, removed 1938
Bridgeton Junction	P-RSL, CNJ	CNJ Southern Div./PRSL(WJ&SS)Bridgeton Branch	Bridgeton; 39.452755°N 75.213069°W	PRSL Bridgeton Branch is abandoned to north
Brigantine Junction	ACRR, RDG, P-RSL	ACRR Main Line, Brigantine Branch	Pomona; 39.472974°N 74.590859°W	All abandoned
Brills Junction	CNJ	Newark and New York Branch	Newark; 40.726072°N 74.136754°W	Newark to Jersey City line abandoned
Brown's Mills Junction	PRR	Philadelphia and Long Branch Railroad, Brown's Mills Branch	Browns Mills; 39.949400°N 74.596982°W	Abandoned
Burlington Junction
Caldwell Junction	NYGL, ERIE, EL	NYGL, Caldwell Branch	Little Falls; 40.872475°N 74.210872°W	Caldwell Branch abandoned. NYGL line now NJT Montclair-Boonton Line, Caldwell Branch now West Essex Trail.
Carteret Junction
Chester Junction	DLW, CNJ	DLW Chester Branch, CNJ High Bridge Branch	Chester; 40.788867°N 74.718180°W	Abandoned, now a rail-trail
Columbia Junction (Delaware Junction)	BRW, NYSW	Blairstown Railway/NYSW former Mainline and Delaware Branch	Columbia; 40.933537°N 75.073512°W	All abandoned
Constable Hook Junction	LV	Constable Hook Branch	Bayone; 40.660461°N 74.116952°W	Active
Cranford Junction	SIRT, B&O, ME, CNJ, NJT	North Shore Branch, Raritan Valley Line	Cranford; 40.656746°N 74.293119°W	Exists
Croxton Junction	ERIE, EL, CSAO, CSX, NS	Erie Main Line, Northern Branch	Jersey City; 40.745873°N 74.064881°W	Active for freight. Junction at southern end of NS Croxton Yard. Passenger service ended after Erie operations were shifted from Pavonia Terminal to Lackawanna Terminal.
Cutoff Junction	DL&W	Sussex Branch, Newton Branch	Lafayette; 41.059349°N 74.727842°W	Abandoned
D&R Junction	DLW, CNJ, NJT, ME	Dover & Rockaway RR, NJT	Dover; 40.898484°N 74.572155°W	Active freight branch used by ME off of NJ Transit Morristown Line
Delair Junction	C&A, WJ&S, PRR, P-RSL, NJT, CSAO	C&A Mainline (NJT River Line/CSAO Bordentown Secondary), Morris Branch to Camden & Atlantic RR (NJT Atlantic City Line)	Pennsauken; 39.977732°N 75.061638°W	Main lines exist, connecting Morris Branch abandoned to the north, new junction created to the south
East Haddonfield Junction	WJ&S, PRR, P-RSL, NJT	Camden & Atlantic RR (NJT Atlantic City Line), Philadelphia, Marlton and Medford Railroad	Haddonfield; 39.890630°N 75.033215°W	Medford branch abandoned
Eatontown Junction	CNJ	Southern Div. and Seashore Br. Longbranch Conn.	Eatontown; 40.298255°N 74.068627°W	Southern Div. operated by CSX, Seashore Br. Longbranch Conn. abandoned
Enterprise Junction
Ferromonte Junction	CNJ, EL, DL&W	High Bridge (CNJ) and Chester (DL&W) Branches	Kenvil; 40.884686°N 74.618310°W	Ferromonte Junction is a railroad junction located in Kenvil, New Jersey. It was originally formed by the crossing at grade of the Central Railroad of New Jersey's High Bridge Branch (former Long Valley Railroad) with the Delaware, Lackawanna and Western Railroad's Chester Branch (former Chester Railroad) and the connection to the Ferromonte Railroad (a CNJ subsidiary). When the Chester Branch was abandoned east of the junction, a switch was cut in to connect the western portion to the High Bridge Branch, and both lines are now operated by the Morristown and Erie Railway
Fish House Junction	C&A, WJ&S, PRR, P-RSL, NJT, CSAO	C&A Mainline (NJT River Line/CSAO Bordentown Secondary), Camden & Atlantic RR (NJT Atlantic City Line)	Pennsauken; 39.975889°N 75.064931°W	Exists
Flemington Junction	PRR	Bel-Del Mainline, Flemington Branch	Lambertville; 40.375157°N 74.949429°W	Bel-Del Mainline Abandoned, Black River and Western Railroad owns Flemington Branch
Flemington Junction	LV	LV Mainline, Flemington Branch	Flemington Junction; 40.531740°N 74.839629°W	Branch abandoned
Franklin Junction	NYSW, LHR	NYSW Zinc Mine branch, LHR Main	Franklin, New Jersey; 41.121819°N 74.589460°W	NYSW Hanford Branch abandoned 1958, LHR acquired portion from Franklin Junction south to New Jersey Zinc Company and renamed "NJ Zinc Mine Branch", abandoned 1987. NYSW runs freight on LHR trackage currently through Franklin.
Gloucester Junction	ACRR, RDG, P-RSL	ACRR Main Line, Grenloch Branch	Camden; 39.903108°N 75.118305°W	Exists
Granton Junction	NYC NYSW	NYSW West Shore Railroad	North Bergen; 40.805105°N 74.022920°W	NYSW; CSX River Subdivision; CSX Northern Branch
Great Island Junction	CNJ, CSAO	CNJ Mainline, Newark Branch/Chemical Coast Line	Elizabeth; 40.658334°N 74.183750°W	Mainline east to Jersey City abandoned
Green Pond Junction	CNJ, NYSW	NYSW Mainline, High Bridge Branch (Wharton & Northern RR)	Jefferson; 41.03785°N 74.433856°W	Second connection after Charlotteburg Reservoir was created. CNJ abandoned 1971, NYSW active.
Hacklebarney Junction	CNJ	High Bridge Branch, Hacklebarney Branch	Chester; 40.787918°N 74.721056°W	All abandoned
Haddonfield Junction	WJ&S, PRR, P-RSL, NJT, PATCO	Camden & Atlantic RR, PATCO Speedline, NJT Atlantic City Line	Haddonfield; 39.904068°N 75.041939°W	Junction at Vernon Interlocking for Main Line to Broadway Station at Camden (now PATCO Speedline) and "Bridge trains" to Philadelphia via Delair Bridge (now NJT Atlantic City Line)
Hainesburg Junction	NYSW, LNE	Former connection of the two railroads to shared single track	Hainesburg; 40°56′35.94″N 75°3′51.54″W	NYSW Main northeast of Hainesburg Jct. to East Stroudsburg, P.A. abandoned and removed 1941, LNE Main west of Hainesburg Jct. abandoned 1961, NYSW abandoned 1962, all trackage removed 1962. Both railroads used 18 miles of shared track from this point north (to Swartswood Junction). A freight interchange yard between the NYS&W and the LNE existed just south of this junction.
Hamburg Junction	NYSW, LHR	NYSW Hanford Branch, LHR Main	Hamburg; 41.140156°N 74.576802°W	NYSW Hanford Branch to north abandoned 1958. Track removed from Hamburg to Unionville, NY 1959. NYSW runs freight on LHR trackage currently through Hamburg.
Hampton Junction	DL&W, CNJ	Hampton Branch, CNJ mainline	Hampton; 40.709912°N 74.951059°W	Hampton Branch abandoned 1958, trackage removed 1959, CNJ Main abandoned, tracks still in place
Harbor Branch Junction	ACRR, RDG, P-RSL	Cape May Branch, Harbor Branch	Cape May; 38.956915°N 74.921449°W	Harbor Branch abandoned
Hibernia Junction	CNJ, DLW, ME	High Bridge Branch (Hibernia Mine RR), DLW Rockaway Branch	Rockaway; 40.893162°N 74.514965°W	ME operates along CNJ; DLW Rockaway Branch abandoned
High Bridge Junction	CNJ	High Bridge Branch, CNJ Main	High Bridge; 40.669814°N 74.899762°W	High Bridge Br. abandoned 1976 by Conrail, trackage removed 1977. CNJ Main abandoned from High Bridge to Phillipsburg by NJT. Tracks still in place.
Hightstown Junction	PRR	Camden and Amboy Railroad, Pemberton and Hightstown Railroad	East Windsor; 40.261390°N 74.540921°W	Abandoned
Hopatcong Junction	CNJ	High Bridge Branch (Lake Hopatcong RR, Dover & Rockaway RR, Longwood Valley RR)	Kenvil; 40.896801°N 74.600335°W	All abandoned
Hopping Junction
Hunter	PRR, CNJ	Raritan Valley Line, NEC, Conrail Lehigh Line	Newark	
Island Heights Junction	PRR, RDG	PRR Amboy Div., RDG branch	Beachwood; 39.939059°N 74.192001°W	Abandoned
Jamesburg Junction
Kearny Junction	Amtrak, NJT	Northeast Corridor, Morris & Essex Lines	Kearny; 40.7438°N 74.1248°W	
Kent Junction
Kingsland Junction	DLW, EL, NJT	Boonton Branch (NJT Main Line), Harrison Cut-Off	Lyndhurst; 40.794017°N 74.107201°W	Harrison Cut-Off abandoned.
Lake Junction	DL&W	Chester Branch	Kenvil; 40.904892°N 74.601188°W	The Chester branch begins at the Lake Junction interchange, where all incoming and outgoing cars are exchanged with Norfolk Southern. The line continues in a southwest direction, to Ferromonte Junction, the start of the High Bridge Branch, and continues southward for about a mile. The line is now operated by the Morristown and Erie Railway, which provides daily service.
Landsdown Junction	LV	Clinton Branch and Pittstown Branch	Franklin; 40.606748°N 74.913405°W	Both Branches are abandoned and now serve as rail trails maintained by the State of New Jersey.
Lehigh Junction
Linden Junction	SIRT, B&O, ME, PRR, NJT	North Shore Branch, Northeast Corridor Line	Linden; 40.641231°N 74.239385°W	SIR active freight line, NEC active passenger line, no current connection
Little Ferry Junction	NYSW	Edgewater Branch	Ridgefield Park; 40.84228°N 74.02809°W	Exists, Edgewater Branch abandoned further east
Lodi Junction (NY&NJ)	NYNJ	Lodi Branch	Teterboro; 40.8648°N 74°W	The NY&NJ (currently NJ Transit's Pascack Valley Line) briefly had a branch line heading west to Lodi, slightly south of the current I-80, eventually. The junction was slightly north of the site of the present Teterboro station.
Lodi Junction	NYSW	Lodi Industrial Spur	Lodi; 40°53′28.98″N 74°3′26.51″W	Short industrial spur that used to serve a number of businesses along Gregg St in Lodi. Mostly used now for car storage. Now abandoned just before Garibaldi Ave, tracks removed south of this point and almost no trace of ROW remains. Used to cross Rt 46 and continue into center of Lodi (and possibly crossing the Saddle Brook) through residential neighborhood where it served a number of chemical plants, which have long since burned down, exploded, or been demolished.
Macopin Lake Junction	NYSW	NYSW Mainline, Macopin Lake Branch	Jefferson; 41.038246°N 74.429049°W	Branch abandoned
Manunka Chunk Junction	DL&W, PRR	Lackawanna Old Road, Bel-Del	Columbia; 40.861770°N 75.047834°W	All abandoned
Marion Junction	PRR, ERIE, CSX, CSAO	River Line, Passaic and Harsimus Line	Jersey City; 40.737665°N 74.07372°W	Exists, active for freight
Meadow Junction	NY&GL, ERIE	NY&GL Main, Erie Main	Jersey City; 40.749027°N 74.068522°W	Junction no longer exists. Merger of Erie with DL&W rendered junction obsolete, as former Erie Mainline (now NJT Main Line) and NY&GL Line (was NJT Boonton Line) to Pavonia Terminal shifted on to DL&W M&E line to Hoboken Terminal. Merger of Montclair Branch with Boonton Line ended traffic through junction and creation of Secaucus Junction obliterated former Erie Mainline ROW.
Medford Junction	WJ&S, PRR, P-RSL	Philadelphia and Atlantic Line, Mount Holly and Medford Branch	Mount Holly; 39.988654°N 74.799591°W	All abandoned
Merchantville Junction	PRR, NS, CSX, NJT	PRR, Camden & Burlington County Railroad, NJT Atlantic City Line	Pennsauken; 39.955790°N 75.039102°W	Exists, active for passenger service
Millham Junction	PRR	New York Line, Millham Branch	Hamilton; 40.236683°N 74.730835°W	exists
Millstone Junction	PRR	PRR/NJ Transit/Amtrak Northeast Corridor, Millstone and New Brunswick Railroad	New Brunswick; 40.479294°N 74.464852°W	Active for local freight service up to just west of Cylde Road in Somerset, abandoned further west of Cylde Road. Few remnants remain of the original line west of Cylde Road in Somerset to East Millstone, NJ. A nice pictorial account of the Millstone Branch is at this website.
Mohingson Junction	NY&LB, CNJ	CNJ Freehold Branch, NY&LB Main	Aberdeen; 40.415014°N 74.222504°W	CNJ line abandoned
Monmouth Junction	PRR	New York Line/Jamesburg Branch/Rocky Hill Branch	South Brunswick; Midway Interlocking; 40.380057°N 74.542685°W	exists, Rocky Hill Branch is abandoned
Monmouth Park Junction	NY&LB, NJT	New York and Long Branch Railroad/North Jersey Coast Line, Monmouth Park Branch	Oceanport; 40.317381°N 74.022975°W	Branch no longer used, as a Monmouth Park station on the line was created
Morris Junction	C&A, WJ&S, PRR, P-RSL, NJT, CSAO	C&A Mainline (NJT River Line/CSAO Bordentown Secondary), Morris Branch to Camden & Atlantic RR (NJT Atlantic City Line)	Pennsauken; 39.985062°N 75.052389°W	Main lines exist, connecting Morris Branch abandoned to the south, new junction created to the south
Morris and Essex Junction
Morris County Junction	CNJ	Lake Hopatcong RR and Wharton & Northern RR	Wharton; 40.904461°N 74.609171°W	All abandoned
Mount Holly Junction	C&A, PRR, NJT	C&A Mainline (NJT River Line/CSAO Bordentown Secondary), Burlington and Mount Holly Railroad and Transportation Company	Burlington; 40.079408°N 74.848267°W	Mount Holly to Burlington abandoned
Mount Hope Junction	CNJ	High Bridge Branch (Dover & Rockaway RR, Mount Hope Mineral RR)	Wharton; 40.903507°N 74.577915°W	All abandoned, along Wharton Rail Trail
Musconetcong Junction	LV	LV Mainline, Musconetcong Branch	Bethlehem; 40.640721°N 75.106455°W	Branch abandoned
National Junction
Newark Junction
Newton Junction	DL&W	Sussex Branch, Newton Branch	Newton; 41.043548°N 74.738730°W	Abandoned
New York and Greenwood Lake Junction
New Jersey and New York Junction
Oak Island Junction	LV, CNJ, CSAO, CSX, NS	LV Mainline (CSAO Lehigh Line), CNJ Newark Branch (CSAO Chemical Coast)	Newark; 40.711726°N 74.146408°W	Active for freight. Located at east end of Oak Island Yard.
Ocean City Junction	RDG, ACRR, P-RSL	Ocean City Branch	Ocean View; 39.245956°N 74.71567°W	Branch to Ocean City exists, Branch to Sea Isle does not
Oreland Junction	CNJ	High Bridge Branch (Wharton & Northern RR, Oreland Branch)	Rockaway; 40.972010°N 74.505954°W	All abandoned
Pacific Avenue Junction
Pascack Junction (Hackensack Junction)	EL, NJT	Bergen County Line, Pascack Valley Line	East Rutherford; 40.816095°N 74.094893°W	Exists
Passaic Junction and Passaic Branch Junction	NYSW, EL, NJT, NS, M&E	NYSW mainline, NJT Bergen County Line	Saddle Brook; 40.902256°N 74.104303°W	Active junctions used for freight. Passaic Junction is a rail yard for NYSW. It includes a track that junctions with the New Jersey Transit Bergen County Line (to the northwest). To the southwest the yard, after the NYSW main line passes under the NJT trestle, the Passaic Branch junction connects to a branch line terminating in Garfield. NS and M&E connections are via the NJT junction.
Paterson Junction	DLW, ERIE, EL, NJT	DLW Boonton Branch (now NJT Main Line), ERIE Newark Branch	Clifton; 40.880614°N 74.164078°W	DLW Boonton Branch originally headed northwest to Boonton. It crossed over Erie Newark Branch, which terminated at the Erie Main Line at Paterson Station. After the Passaic Plan went into effect in the 1960s, lines merged and continued north along the Erie line. Route 80 was built over the line to Boonton. Junction exists, but Newark Branch only sees occasional freight usage.
Pemberton Junction	PRR	PRR Amboy Div.	Pemberton; 39.975458°N 74.699456°W	Abandoned
Pennsauken Junction	PRR, NS, CSX	PRR, Camden & Burlington County Railroad	Pennsauken; 39.954014°N 75.034062°W	Exists, active for freight, abandoned to west
Perth Junction
Perth Amboy Junction	PRR, NJT	New York Line/Northeast Corridor Line, Perth Amboy Branch/North Jersey Coast Line	Rahway; 40.598937°N 74.285078°W	exists
Phillipsburg Junction
PJ Junction
Pompton Junction	NYSW, NY&GL/Erie	NY&GL, later the Erie's Greenwood Lake Branch/NYSW main	Pompton Lakes; 41.003435°N 74.300039°W	Now the junction between the NYSW main and its Pompton Industrial spur, which was the NY&GL main.
Port Morris Junction	DL&W	Phillipsburg Line /Lackawanna Cut-Off	Roxbury; 40.90769°N 74.66968°W	Tower exists, adjacent to Port Morris yard, Lackawanna Cut-Off tracks removed in 1984.
Port Reading Junction	LV, RDG	Former junction for the Reading Railroad Trenton Line and Lehigh Valley Railroad Main Line	Manville; 40.547657°N 74.57624°W	A major railroad junction used by Conrail, CSX and Norfolk Southern for freight operations into northeastern New Jersey from points south and west. There are a lot of train movements through this junction every day.
Princeton Junction	PRR	New York Line/Princeton Branch	West Windsor; 40.3167°N 74.6233°W	Exists, Used by NJ Transit as shuttle to Princeton.
PRR Junction				
Richland Junction	CSAO, P-RSL, ACRR			
Ridgewood Junction	NJT, NS	Main Line/Bergen County Line	Glen Rock; 40.970548°N 74.126057°W	Still an active junction. Controlled remotely. Stone interlocking tower WJ still stands at this location, but is not active, used by maintenance of way crews.
Ringwood Junction	NY&GL, ERIE	NY&GL Main/Ringwood Branch(spur)	Ringwood; 41°6′19.74″N 74°16′22.43″W	All lines abandoned, no tracks, ROW still visible. Junction allowed the Ringwood branch to split off from the main and go several miles to the north to the Iron Mines (Peter's Mine/Cannon Mine) and Ringwood Station. Passenger service ended around 1939, service to mines ended after WWII, rails removed sometime in 1960s.
Riddleton Junction	WJ&S, PRR, P-RSL	Salem Railroad, Woodstown and Swedesboro Railroad	Woodstown; 39.594392°N 75.352886°W	All Abandoned
Roseville Junction	DL&W, EL, NJT	NJ Transit Morris and Essex Lines	Newark; 40.754747°N 74.190944°W	Continues to be a junction on the NJ Transit Morris and Essex lines as the Montclair-Boonton line breaks off from the mainline in Newark.
Rutherford Junction	ERIE, EL	Erie Main Line/Bergen County Line	Rutherford; 40.836719°N 74.104464°W	Junction no longer exists. Junction was just north of Rutherford Station, and was controlled by a stone interlocking tower ("BJ"), which still stands at the site. The Main Line trackage diverted to the left, crossing the Passaic River into Passaic, where the rails went right up the center of Main Ave for about a mile with north and south bound auto traffic on either side of the rails. The Main Line continued through Paterson, and continued north until it met the Bergen County Line at its northern end at Ridgewood Jct ("WJ"). After the merger with the DL&W, the Erie Main Line was abandoned on west side of Passaic River and up through Passaic. The old Main Line tracks were used for a number of years after this time from the junction for about 1 mile west to serve two chemical companies that existed just east of where tracks used to cross the river (at Jackson Ave & W. Erie Ave, Rutherford). Today the old Main Line rails are still intact up to this intersection, along with dilapidated crossing gates and flashers. This track has not been used since the 1970s, is completely overgrown, and discussions are going on between Rutherford and NS to abandon it and turn it over to Rutherford for a bike/hike trail.
Sayreville Junction	CSAO	Raritan River Railroad, Sayreville Branch	Sayreville; 40.465789°N 74.329950°W	Branch abandoned
Sea Isle Junction	PRR, WJ&SS, P-RSL	Cape May Branch, Sea Isle Branch	Ocean View; 39.206586°N 74.764631°W	Abandoned
Serviss Junction	CSAO	Raritan River Railroad, Serviss Branch	East Brunswick; 40.443740°N 74.400005°W	Active for freight
Somerset Junction	PRR	Bel-Del Mainline, Mercer and Somerset Railway	Ewing; 40.277602°N 74.853522°W	Abandoned
South Amboy Junction	C&A, PAW, CNJ, CSAO, NJT	Camden and Amboy Railroad, Perth Amboy and Woodbridge Railroad, New York and Long Branch Railroad	South Amboy; 40°29′23″N 74°17′3″W	Site of the abandoned Essay Tower
Sparta Junction	LHR, NYSW	Former crossover of two railroads	Sparta; 41°3′52.74″N 74°39′59.27″W	NYSW tracks west of junction abandoned 1962 (Hainesburg Branch), was an interchange with LNE. NYSW tracks from the east have a permanent connection to former LHR tracks to the north. Was previously just a crossover junction between the two railroads. Original crossover junction gone. However, there still is a junction here to use trackage south of old crossover on old LHR right of way to Limecrest Quarry about a half mile south. LHR south of that point abandoned. Eastern Propane is also served at this location.
Spruce Street Junction
Staten Island Junction	SIRT, B&O, ME, LV, CSAO	North Shore Branch, Lehigh Line	Cranford; 40.655036°N 74.285818°W	Both active freight lines, no current connection
Sterling Junction	LV			
Summit Junction	EL	Former interchange with Rahway Valley Railroad	Summit; 40.714754°N 74.351547°W	Abandoned/rail removed, but Union County is working to restore service on the Rahway Valley Railroad and the junction might be reactivated.
Sussex Junction	NYSW, LNE	NYSW Middletown Branch, LNE Mainline	Sussex; 41.201443°N 74.596535°W	All abandoned
Swartswood Junction	NYSW, LNE	Former connection of the two railroads to shared single track	Newton; 41°4′23.82″N 74°47′14.94″W	Abandoned/rails removed in 1962. Both railroads used 18 miles of shared track from this point south (to Hainesburg Junction). A telegraph office and operator was at this location to operate the hand switch and give train crews their movement orders. Its call was JU. Ruins of the building still exist.
Trenton Junction	RDG	Mainline, Trenton Branch	Ewing; 40.262166°N 74.812143°W	Active
Undercliff Junction	NYS&W	Mainline, Edgewater branch	Little Ferry; 40.8417°N 74.028197°W	Junction exists, but Edgewater branch dead ends at Bergen Hill tunnel
Vanatta Junction	DLW	DLW Chester Branch, Ferromonte Railroad	Kenvil; 40.878684°N 74.621642°W	Ferromonte Railroad abandoned
Warbasse Junction	DLW, NYSW	DLW Sussex Branch, NYSW main	Lafayette; 41.084473°N 74.698967°W	All lines now abandoned, NYSW former Mainline then Hainesburg Br. abandoned 1962, trackage removed 1962, DLW Sussex Branch abandoned 1966 by EL, trackage removed 1966
Washington Junction	DL&W	Morris and Essex Railroad, Warren Railroad	Washington; 40.758074°N 74.968142°W	former Warren Railroad abandoned, former M&E line active freight line
Waretown Junction (Barnegat Junction)	CNJ, TRR	Toms River and Barnegat RR, Tuckerton Railroad	Waretown; 39.778543°N 74.210287°W	All abandoned
West End Junction	DLW, ERIE, EL, NJT	Main Line, Morris & Essex Lines	Jersey City; 40.740951°N 74.065405°W	Active for passenger service
West End Junction	NJS, NY&LB, CNJ	CNJ Southern Div., NY&LB Main	Long Branch; 40.285500°N 73.989444°W	CNJ Southern Div. abandoned (toward Sandy Hook). Passenger service active on NJT North Jersey Coast Line
West Newark Junction	PRR	PRR/NJT/Amtrak Northeast Corridor, New York Bay Railroad, West Newark Branch	Newark; 40.712978°N 74.185593°W	West Newark Branch abandoned
Wharton & Northern Junction	CNJ, NYSW	NYSW Mainline, High Bridge Branch (Wharton & Northern RR)	Jefferson; 41.027249°N 74.416690°W	Was original connection before Charlotteburg Reservoir was created. CNJ abandoned 1971, NYSW active.
Wharton Junction	CNJ	High Bridge Branch (Wharton & Northern RR, Morris County Connecting RR)	Wharton; 40.914871°N 74.593059°W	All abandoned
Whiting Junction	CNJ, PRR	CNJ Southern Division, PRR Amboy Div., Tuckerton Railroad	Whiting; 39.951645°N 74.379342°W	CNJ Southern Division active for freight
Wildwood Junction	RDG, ACRR, P-RSL	Cape May Branch/Wildwood Branch	Rio Grande; 39.030420°N 74.865582°W	Wildwood Branch is abandoned. Bridge at Grassy Sound has been removed.
Williamstown Junction	W&DR, ACRR; P-RSL	Clementon Branch/Williamstown Branch	Winslow; 39.737027°N 74.920806°W	Williamstown Branch is abandoned. Williamstown Branch ran to Mullica Hill to the west and Atco to east, with earlier continuation to Atsion. Section between Glassboro and Williamstown currently serves as the Monroe Township Bikeway rail trail.
Winslow Junction	WJ&SS; ACRR; CNJ; P-RSL	CNJ Southern Div. WJ&SS Main Line; ACRR Main Line/Cape May Branch	Winslow; 39.661572°N 74.846117°W	exists, CNJ Southern Div. abandoned 1978 to the north, ACRR AC Line is abandoned to the east
Woodbine Junction (Mount Pleasant Junction)	P-RSL; ACRR; WJ&SS	WJ&SS Millville Branch; ACRR Cape May Branch	Woodbine; 39.230198°N 74.795671°W	WJ&S Millville Branch is abandoned
Woodbridge Junction (Long Branch Junction)	CNJ, PRR, CSAO, NJT	Chemical Coast Line, Perth Amboy Branch	Perth Amboy; 40.526392°N 74.266723°W	exists, Perth Amboy Branch is abandoned to the south

Abbreviations used in the table:

- ACRR = Atlantic City Railroad
- B&O = Baltimore and Ohio Railroad
- BRW = Blairstown Railway
- C&A = Camden and Amboy Railroad
- CNJ = Central Railroad of New Jersey
- CSAO = Conrail Shared Assets Operations
- DLW = Delaware, Lackawanna and Western Railroad
- ERIE = Erie Railroad
- EL = Erie Lackawanna Railroad
- LHR = Lehigh and Hudson River Railway
- LV = Lehigh Valley Railroad
- NJT = New Jersey Transit
- LNE = Lehigh and New England Railroad
- M&E = Morristown & Erie Railway
- NS = Norfolk Southern
- NYC = New York Central Railroad
- NY&GL = New York and Greenwood Lake Railway
- NYSW = New York, Susquehanna and Western Railway
- PRR = Pennsylvania Railroad
- P-RSL = Pennsylvania–Reading Seashore Lines
- RDG = Reading Railroad
- SIRT = Staten Island Rapid Transit Railroad
- WJ&S = West Jersey and Seashore Railroad
- W&DR = Williamstown and Delaware River Railroad

Line names may not be official, but serve to identify the line.
