= M&E =

M&E may refer to:

- Morris and Essex Railroad
- Morris & Essex Lines
- Morristown and Erie Railway
- Monitoring and evaluation
- Electromechanics, combines mechanical engineering and electrical engineering
- Mechatronics, a portmanteau of mechanics and electronics
- Machinery and Equipment (accounting)
- Meals and Entertainment (accounting)
