= Dover and Rockaway River Railroad =

Overview
- Parent company: Chesapeake and Delaware, LLC
- Headquarters: Ringoes, New Jersey
- Reporting mark: DRRV
- Locale: Northern New Jersey
- Dates of operation: 2017–present

Technical
- Track gauge: 4 ft 8 1/2 in (1,435 mm) standard gauge
- Length: 6 mi (9.7 km)

Other
- Website: www.cadrailroads.com

The Dover & Rockaway River Railroad (reporting mark DRRV) is a short-line railroad operating in Morris County, New Jersey. On July 1, 2017, it took over operation of three Morris County owned rail lines previously operated by Morristown and Erie. The DRRV is a wholly owned subsidiary of Chesapeake and Delaware, LLC.

== Lines ==
=== Chester Branch ===
The former DLW Chester Branch was extended in 1869 to Chester, New Jersey, to serve the local mining industry. A connection with the CNJ Chester Branch also reportedly existed. In 1934, DLW abandoned and tore up their Chester Branch from the CNJ connection near Chester to Succasunna. In 1983 Conrail planned to abandon the branch line, but Holland Manufacturing and Westinghouse Elevator purchased the line to continue rail services to their facilities. In 2009, Morris County, New Jersey, purchased the line and leased rail operations to M&E. Branching off from Lake Junction, it ends in Succasunna. DRRV freight service uses this line to access the High Bridge Branch at Ferromonte Junction. The line was rehabilitated in 2010 with the use of federal stimulus funds obtained by the line's new owner, Morris County Department of Transportation. Starting in July 2017 the line was leased to DRRV.

==== Customers ====
- Holland Manufacturing, Succasunna (adhesives, paper products)
- Kuiken Brothers Company, Succasunna (lumber, building materials)

=== High Bridge Branch ===
The High Bridge Branch is owned by Morris County, New Jersey, and is leased to DRRV. A former Central Railroad of New Jersey line called the High Bridge Branch, it splits from the Chester Branch at Ferromonte Junction and heads southwest through Succasunna and Flanders. The line ends west of U.S. Route 206 at Bartley Rd. near Flanders. Originally excluded from the Conrail system in 1976, the line remained in service under a subsidy agreement by local authorities as far as Califon until roughly 1980. Around this time, there was talk New Jersey Transit would use the line to connect their lines at High Bridge and Lake Junction but the plan fell through. Track removal between High Bridge and Flanders occurred later in 1980, only taking about a year to complete. Morris County purchased the in-service part of the line from the state in 1982.

==== Customers ====
- Blue Ridge Lumber, Kenvil (Kenvil Team Track) (lumber, building materials)
- Reuther Manufacturing, Roxbury (Masonry materials)
- Triumph Plastics, Flanders (plastic)

=== Dover & Rockaway Branch ===
Originally the Dover & Rockaway Railroad. The line operates from D&R Junction (where it meets the NJ Transit Morristown Line) in Wharton through downtown Dover northeast to Rockaway. The line ends along Green Pond Road in Rockaway Township, north of Interstate 80. This line passes through downtown Dover and Rockaway with many street crossings. Most of the customers on this branch are located in an industrial park along Green Pond Road, at the north end of the branch.

==== Customers ====
- C&M Metals, Dover (scrap metal - recycling)
- Polyfil, Rockaway (plastics - polymer additives)
- Endot, Rockaway (plastics - piping)
- TriPak, Rockaway (plastics - packaging)
- 84 Lumber, Rockaway (lumber, building materials)
