= Kearny Junction =

Coordinates: 40.7438°N 74.1248°W

Kearny Junction was an electrified Double-track railroad junction in Kearny, New Jersey along the Delaware, Lackawanna and Western Railroad main line. Just west of Kearny Junction, the DL&W Harrison Cut-off to Kingsland joins the DL&W main line. It was designed to connect NJ Transit's Morris line and Essex line with Amtrak's Northeast Corridor line.

== See also ==
- Kearny Connection
- Waterfront Connection
- List of New Jersey railroad junctions
