= Black River and Western Railroad =

New Jersey railroad

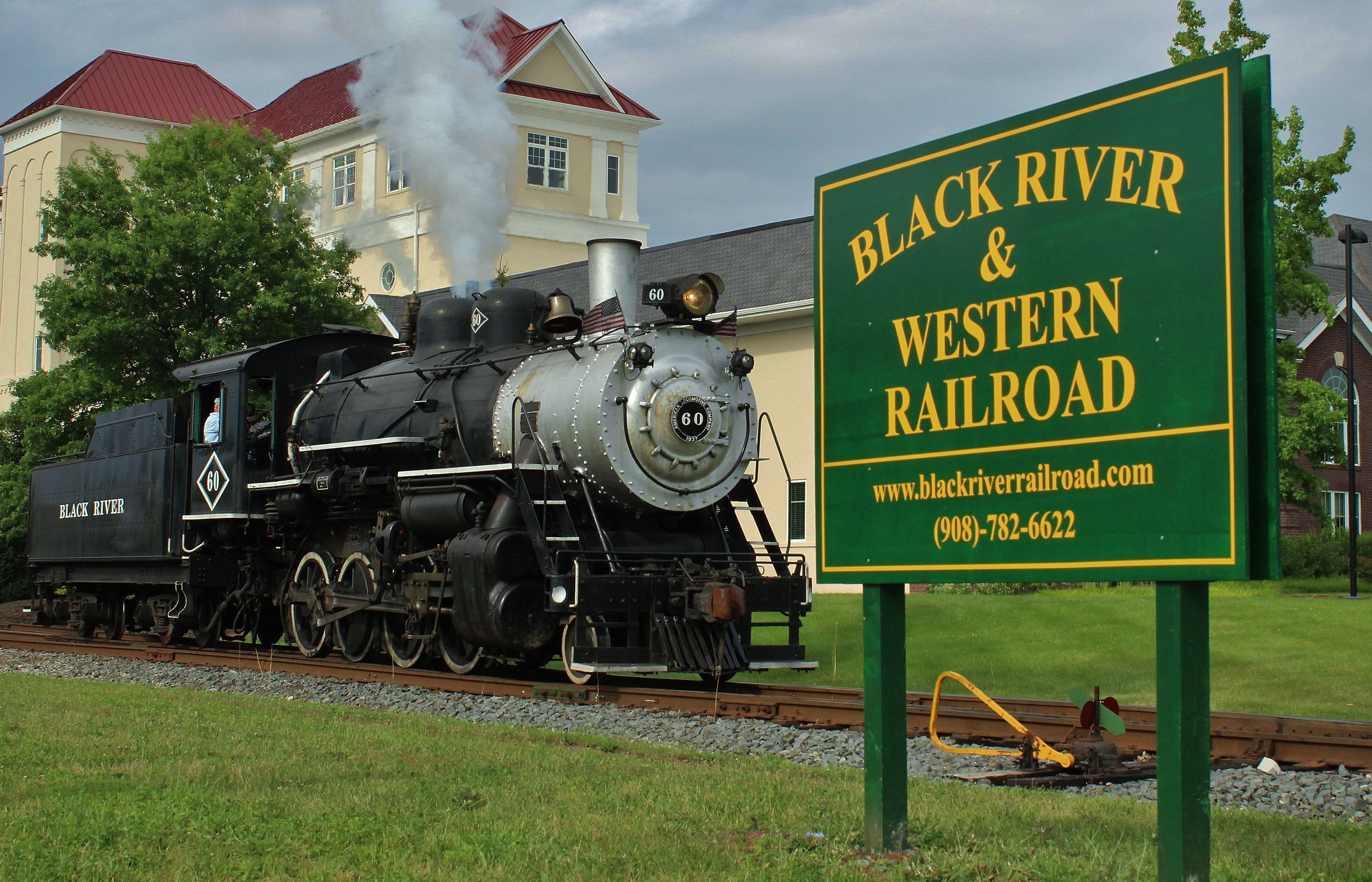
- No. 60 at the station in Hunterdon County, New Jersey

Overview
- Parent company: Chesapeake and Delaware, LLC
- Headquarters: Ringoes, New Jersey, U.S.
- Reporting mark: BRW
- Locale: Hunterdon County, New Jersey, U.S.
- Dates of operation: 1961–1962; 1965–present
- Predecessor: Pennsylvania Railroad; Central Railroad of New Jersey

Technical
- Track gauge: 4 ft 8 1/2 in (1,435 mm) standard gauge
- Length: 16 miles (26 kilometres)

Other
- Website: www.blackriverrailroad.com www.brwrr.com

The Black River and Western Railroad (reporting mark BRW) is a freight and heritage railroad operating in Hunterdon County, New Jersey, between Flemington, Lambertville and Ringoes. The railroad operates vintage steam and diesel powered locomotives. The railroad also owns and operates the Belvidere and Delaware River Railway in Phillipsburg, New Jersey.

== History ==
The Black River & Western Railroad was started by William Whitehead in Oldwick, New Jersey, in the late 1950s. A portion of the defunct Rockaway Valley Railroad went through his back yard. He and his sons started collecting rolling stock and an engine (Lackawanna #565). They started laying tracks but then the expansion of I-78 halted their dream of building a railroad at that location. They moved their equipment to the Chester Branch of the Central Railroad of New Jersey with the hope of starting a railroad there.

BRW was officially incorporated in 1961. The railroad's name is derived from the Black River, a river near Chester and the original name of the borough. The "and Western" is standard railroad nomenclature. Following a brief stint of test operations on CNJ's Chester Branch, equipment was moved to Flemington, New Jersey in 1963 and the search for a place to start their tourist train was continued. A leasing arrangement was created with the Pennsylvania Railroad that allowed a tourist train to operate from Flemington to Lambertville on the original Belvidere-Delaware Railroad (PRR Belvidere Division) Flemington Branch (originally the Flemington Railroad & Transportation Company) in 1964. BR&W paid $5,000 a year and rehabilitated the railroad (PRR operated freight service on the line during this period). Steam engine No. 60 operated its first passenger test run on April 25, 1965 and pulled the first trip out of Flemington on May 16, 1965. Weekend and holiday schedules were devised.

BRW assumed ownership and operations of the Flemington Branch from the CNJ connection in Flemington to Flemington Branch Junction in Lambertville on March 16, 1970, purchasing it from PRR successor Penn Central. With the acquisition of the rail line and its freight operations, on top of the existing tourist passenger service, a true shortline railroad was born. Base operations were established in Ringoes, New Jersey, and remain so today. Freight interchange after the 1970 purchase was made with PC at Lambertville and CNJ in Flemington. PC filed for bankruptcy that June.

PC continued to operate freight under bankruptcy protection until April 1, 1976 when Conrail assumed operations (the last PC freight train to operate on the Belvidere Division was on March 31, 1976). BR&W then purchased three miles of trackage in the Lambertville area that was part of the Belvidere Division mainline on March 31, 1976 before Conrail took over. BR&W also purchased the Flemington-Three Bridges portion from the bankrupt CNJ. Although coal, iron ore and general freights were rerouted to other lines such as the North Penn Branch, CR continued operating smaller interchange freight trains to Lambertville. In March 1977, a new interchange was built at Three Bridges, New Jersey with the former Lehigh Valley Railroad mainline.

Freight service to Lambertville ended by 1995 with tourist operations ceasing by the end of 1998, when the Federal Railroad Administration prohibited operations south of Ringoes due to poor track conditions. There was talk in 1999 of Trap Rock Industries quarry using the stub-ended section north of Lambertville for unit stone trains, resulting in a frenzy of track repairs taking place on the Ringoes-Lambertville segment to accommodate the anticipated traffic. The quarry ultimately backed out with the final work train operating in June 2002 to retrieve all remaining rolling stock.

In 2003, the town of Phillipsburg, New Jersey, and the BRW joined to redevelop a former Pennsylvania Railroad (PRR) right-of-way between Phillipsburg and Carpentersville as a tourist operation called the Belvidere and Delaware River Railway (Bel-Del). The NYSW Technical and Historical Society, which was searching for a place to regularly operate No. 142, joined the partnership to help plan their excursion services. On May 1, Bel-Del held its opening ceremony, and No. 142 hauled their six-car inaugural train.

In 2004, the railroad leased 10 miles of trackage to Bel-Del.

In 2017, the railroad began running freight service for its parent company, Chesapeake and Delaware, LLC.

=== Black River Railroad Historic Trust formed ===
In 2001, a separate non-profit entity known as the Black River Railroad Historic Trust (BRRHT), was formed to take over the tourist trains on the line. BRRHT does not own most of the passenger cars and until 2011, fees had to be paid to the BR&W for their use. BRRHT owns one diesel locomotive switcher, an SW9 numbered 438. It currently leases some coaches from the railroad and has use of several locomotives.

In 2014, the BRRHT started to clear the line between Ringoes and Lambertville for passenger trains. In 2016 the first passenger train went down the first mile of the newly restored line in almost 20 years. In 2017, the BRRHT restored the first 2.5 miles of the line which is where Bowne Road Station is and Black River have been doing special events. In 2019, the BRRHT opened a further 1 mile towards Mount Airy Road.

=== Recent history ===
In 2014, BRRHT announced that it was looking to reinstate service along the dormant Ringoes-Lambertville section now called the Alexauken Division. In May 2017, the first two and a half miles was re-introduced to passenger service. The in-service track reached Bowne Station, just over 4 miles north of Lambertville. Bowne Station included a picnic grove co-constructed with Woodsedge Farm and the railroad. Special picnic and farm trains were scheduled year for this new portion of the line, along with an evening departure from Ringoes every Saturday and Sunday that special events did not operate. Sadly, in 2021, the remains of Hurricane Ida caused disastrous flooding that washed out portions of the restored trackage. In addition, an entre section of embankment was destroyed near Lambertville.

== Stations ==
Station	Status	Image	History
Three Bridges	Freight only station		Three Bridges was a former station on the Central Railroad of New Jersey's South Branch. The South Branch ran from a wye at Somerville, NJ station to Flemington. While there is no actual station and passenger service does not go this far, Three Bridges is where the BR&W interchanges with Norfolk Southern. Today a small shed stands across the track from where the station did. Last BRW passenger train to Three Bridges ran in 2016.
Flemington (Main Street)	Station building utilized by local bank		Flemington was the former terminus station of the Central Railroad of New Jersey's South Branch in Flemington, New Jersey. Service at the station began on July 1, 1864 and passenger service was discontinued on April 25, 1953.
Flemington (PRR)	Station building currently used for retail space		Originally used by the Pennsylvania Railroad, then when the BR&W came, they put a small shack not too far from the PRR Station. Then in the 1970s, the shack was removed and replaced by wooden car #101; and was used until it was burned in 1991. The station on the line marked the terminus to the Flemington Branch.
Flemington (Liberty Village)	Served by BRW		When nearby Liberty Village was being remodeled, Black River & Western sold off the original PRR station and per agreement, Liberty Village built them a new station closer to Route 12. Historically, the Pennsylvania Railroad interchanged with the Central Railroad of New Jersey just north of this station.
Copper Hill	Originally small station. Only siding remains.		Copper Hill was a small combination freight and passenger station, with a siding for loading produce from local farms. The area was named Copper Hill due to copper ore deposits found nearby, although the name is also thought to come from copperhead snakes that were found in the area. Siding is going to be used to allow trains to pass each other starting june 2022.
Hog Town	Abandoned		Hog Town is a small shack and was built around 1970 by the BR&W as part of their Great Train Robberies. In the off-season, the station was occupied by "The Mayor of Hogtown", who used to persuade passengers to vote for him as mayor (as part of a gag). The area got its name due to the nearby, and now demolished, home that raised hogs. The station is located next to the abandoned Hunterdon Concrete facility.
Five Birds Farm (formerly Muirhead)	Originally flagstop		Once part of the village of Muirhead (now gone), Muirhead was an early station for the Pennsylvania Railroad. The station closed in the 1920s. The station was moved a few hundred yards east and has been converted to event space, it is now owned by Five Birds Farm. The original site is used as a stop for the farm which works with the railroad to host modern events curated by nature, and has been renamed "Five Birds Farm".
Pumpkin Junction	Served by BRW		Pumpkin Junction is a farm station along the line constructed in 2008. The stop is used in October as part of the railroad's Pumpkin Trains.
Ringoes	Served by BRW		Ringoes was a former Pennsylvania Railroad station on their Flemington branch. Ringoes is the main yard and headquarters of the Black River and Western Railroad.
Boss Rd.	Originally flagstop		A flagstop during the PRR era of the branch line. Closed 1931, gone.
Bowne	Served by BRW		The original Bowne station was located south of the Bowne Station Rd. bridge. It was moved in the early 1930s north of the bridge near a home and has been converted into a shed. Today, the Black River Railroad Historical Trust has created a picnic grove where the station originally sat south of the bridge. This station can only be accessed by rail.
Mount Airy	Originally flagstop		A flagstop during the PRR era of the branch line. Closed 1931, gone. In the area where current active track ends.
Alexauken	Originally flagstop		A flagstop during the PRR era of the branch line. Closed 1931, gone.
Lambertville	Out-Of-Service. Building currently Lambertville Station Inn & Restaurant.		Just south of the junction between the Bel-Del mainline and the Flemington Branch, Lambertville serves as the southernmost station along the BR&W. The last train to depart the station was in December 1998. Black River & Western had plans to be back in Lambertville sometime in the early 2020s, as part of their Alexauken Division project.

== Equipment ==
=== Locomotives ===
Locomotive details
Number	Image	Type	Model	Built	Builder	Heritage	Status
1		Mack Truck	33-ton switcher	1927	Mack	Crucible Steel	Display
60		Steam	2-8-0	1937	American Locomotive Company	Great Western Railway of Colorado	Undergoing 1,472-day inspection and overhaul
112		Diesel	SW1	1952	Electro-Motive Diesel	Lehigh Valley Railroad	Operational
438		Diesel	SW9	1952	Electro-Motive Diesel	Erie Railroad	Operational
752		Diesel	GP9	1956	Electro-Motive Diesel	Northern Pacific Railway	Operational
780		Diesel	SD7	1950	Electro-Motive Diesel	Amtrak	Operational
811		Diesel	GP9	1959	Electro-Motive Diesel	Nickel Plate Road	Operational
908		Diesel	SW900	1951	Electro-Motive Diesel	Lehigh Valley Railroad	Out of service
909		Diesel	SW9	Unknown	Electro-Motive Diesel	Portland Power Plant	Operational
915		Diesel	SW900	1956	Electro-Motive Diesel	Winchester and Western Railroad	Out of service
1202		Diesel	SW1200	1957	Electro-Motive Diesel	New York, New Haven & Hartford Railroad	Operational
1206		Diesel	SW1200RS	1957	Electro-Motive Diesel	Canadian National Railway	Operational
1259		Diesel	SW1200RS	1960	Electro-Motive Diesel	Canadian Pacific Railway	Operational
1539		Diesel	SW1500	1960	Electro-Motive Diesel	Pittsburgh & Lake Erie Railroad	Operational
1567		Diesel	SW1500	1973	Electro-Motive Diesel	Penn Central	Out of service
1596		Diesel	SW1500	1972	Electro-Motive Diesel	Conrail	Operational
1823		Diesel	GP10	1955	Electro-Motive Diesel	New York Central Railroad	Operational
1848		Diesel	GP9	1954	Electro-Motive Diesel	Northern Pacific Railway	Out of service
1849		Diesel	GP9	1955	Electro-Motive Diesel	Northern Pacific Railway	Operational
1850		Diesel	GP9	1956	Electro-Motive Diesel	Chesapeake & Ohio Railway	Operational
1853		Diesel	GP9	1958	Electro-Motive Diesel	Texas Mexican Railway	Out of service
1854		Diesel	GP8	1953	Electro-Motive Diesel	Pennsylvania Railroad	Operational
1856		Diesel	GP10	1955	Electro-Motive Diesel	New York Central Railroad	Stored
1888		Diesel	GP9u	1959	Electro-Motive Diesel	Canadian Pacific Railway	Operational
1889		Diesel	GP9u	1954	Electro-Motive Diesel	Canadian Pacific Railway	Operational
2005		Diesel	GP38-2	1970	Electro-Motive Diesel	Dover and Rockaway River Railroad	Operational
2006		Diesel	GP38-2	1968	Electro-Motive Diesel	Dover and Rockaway River Railroad	Operational
8142		Diesel	SW1200RS	1959	Electro-Motive Diesel	Canadian Pacific Railway	Operational
8159		Diesel	SW1200RS	1960	Electro-Motive Diesel	Canadian Pacific Railway	Operational
9206		Diesel	SW1	Unknown	Electro-Motive Diesel	Pennsylvania Railroad	Operational
9581		Diesel	SD9m	1955	Electro-Motive Diesel	Norfolk Southern Railway	Operational

=== Former units ===
Locomotive details
Number	Image	Type	Model	Built	Builder	Heritage	Current owner
M-55		Railcar	Doodlebug	1930	Electro-Motive Diesel	Arizona Eastern Railroad	Nevada Northern Railway
14		Steam	0-6-0T	1920	H.K. Porter, Inc.	Brooklyn Eastern District Terminal	Ulster & Delaware Historical Society
41		Diesel	CF7	1950	Electro-Motive Diesel	Atchison, Topeka and Santa Fe Railway	Unknown (scrapped)
42		Diesel	CF7	1951	Electro-Motive Diesel	Atchison, Topeka and Santa Fe Railway	Maryland and Delaware Railroad
50		Diesel	Unknown	Unknown	Davenport	Unknown	Trap Rock Inc.
56		Diesel	T-6	1958	American Locomotive Company	Conrail	West Jersey Shortline
57		Diesel	RS-1	1948	American Locomotive Company	Washington Terminal	Private owner
58		Diesel	RS-1	1951	American Locomotive Company	Unknown	None (scrapped)
148		Steam	4-6-2	1920	American Locomotive Company	Florida East Coast	United States Sugar Corporation
204		Diesel	RS-1	1947	Alco-GE	Devco Railway	None (scrapped)
211		Diesel	RS-1	1951	Alco-GE	Devco Railway	None (scrapped)
400		Diesel	SW-1	1943	Electro-Motive Diesel	Broward County Port Authority	None (scrapped)
400		Diesel	44-ton switcher	1940s	General-Electric Diesel	Long Island Rail Road	Connecticut Eastern Railroad Museum
565		Steam	2-6-0	1908	American Locomotive Company	Delaware, Lackawanna and Western Railroad	Steamtown National Historic Site
782		Diesel	GP7	1950	Electro-Motive Diesel	Amtrak	Owned by Vintage Locomotives Inc., scrapped (2021)
1554		Diesel	RS-3	1953	American Locomotive Company	Central Railroad of New Jersey	Anthracite Railroads Historical Society
4666		Railcar	Doodlebug	1930	J. G. Brill Company	Pennsylvania Railroad	Privately owned, Allentown and Auburn Railroad
7079		Diesel	65-ton switcher	1940s	General-Electric Diesel	U.S. Army	Privately owned, New Castle, DE

=== Former leased units ===
Locomotive details
Number	Image	Type	Model	Heritage	Built	Builder	Owner
412		Diesel	VO-1000	Baltimore and Ohio Railroad	1945	Baldwin Locomotive Works	SMS Lines
418		Diesel	F3	New Jersey Transit	Unknown	Electro-Motive Diesel	Unknown
732		Diesel	GP9	Unknown	1955	Electro-Motive Diesel	Winchester and Western Railroad
1523		Diesel	GP7	Central Railroad of New Jersey	1952	Electro-Motive Diesel	United Railroad Historical Society of New Jersey
1524		Diesel	GP7	Central Railroad of New Jersey	1952	Electro-Motive Diesel	United Railroad Historical Society of New Jersey
1712		Diesel	GP16	Clinchfield Railroad	1950	Electro-Motive Diesel	Everett Railroad
7000		Diesel	GP9	Pennsylvania Railroad	1955	Electro-Motive Diesel	United Railroad Historical Society of New Jersey

=== Rolling stock ===
Rolling stock details
Number	Image	Heritage	Type	Status
297		Central Railroad of New Jersey	Combine car	Operational
322		Central Railroad of New Jersey	Passenger car	Operational
605		Delaware, Lackawanna and Western Railroad	Passenger car	Operational
1009		Central Railroad of New Jersey	Passenger car	Operational
5		Gulf, Mobile and Ohio Railroad	Business car	Out of service
585		Delaware, Lackawanna and Western Railroad	Passenger car	Under restoration
302		Delaware, Lackawanna and Western Railroad	Passenger car	Out of service
303		Delaware, Lackawanna and Western Railroad	Passenger car	Out of service
304		Delaware, Lackawanna and Western Railroad	Passenger car	Out of service
319		New Jersey Transit, ex Great Northern Railway	Passenger car	Out of service
320		New Jersey Transit, ex Great Northern Railway	Passenger car	Out of service
491		Canadian National Railway	Passenger car	Out of service
1318		Central Railroad of New Jersey	Passenger car	Out of service
1362		USAT	Passenger car	Out of service
1369		USAT	Passenger car	Out of service
420		Central Railroad of New Jersey	Baggage car	Out of service
494		Canadian National Railway	Passenger car	Out of service
17112		USAT	Passenger car	Display
8424		New York Central Railroad	Passenger car	Out of service
"Chenango"		Pennsylvania Railroad	Passenger car	Out of service
103		Southern Railway	Boxcar	Stored
111		Conrail	Boxcar	Stored
304		Conrail	Ballast hopper	Stored
308		Conrail	Ballast hopper	Operational
309		Conrail	Ballast hopper	Operational
310		Conrail	Ballast hopper	Operational
601		Lehigh Valley Railroad	Boxcar	Stored
15555		Conrail	Ore car	Stored
16002		Long Island Railroad	Crane car	Stored
16003		Amtrak	Flatcar	Stored
475532		Unknown	Flatcar	Stored
487052		Conrail	Hopper	Scrapped
497310		Pennsylvania Railroad	Boxcar	Operational
770506		Conrail	Flatcar	Stored
133		Chesapeake and Ohio Railway	Caboose	Operational
385		Southern Railway	Caboose	Operational
596		Montreal, Maine and Atlantic Railway	Caboose	Operational
645		Maine Central Railroad	Caboose	Operational
2727		Atchison, Topeka and Santa Fe Railway	Caboose	Operational
477375		Pennsylvania Railroad	Caboose	Out of service
C-140		Erie Railroad	Caboose	Operational
200		Reading Company	Caboose	Out of service
595		Norfolk and Western Railway	Caboose	Out of service
1417		Denver and Rio Grande Western Railroad	Caboose	Out of service
24531		New York Central Railroad	Caboose	Display
95106		Lehigh Valley Railroad	Caboose	Display

== Gallery ==
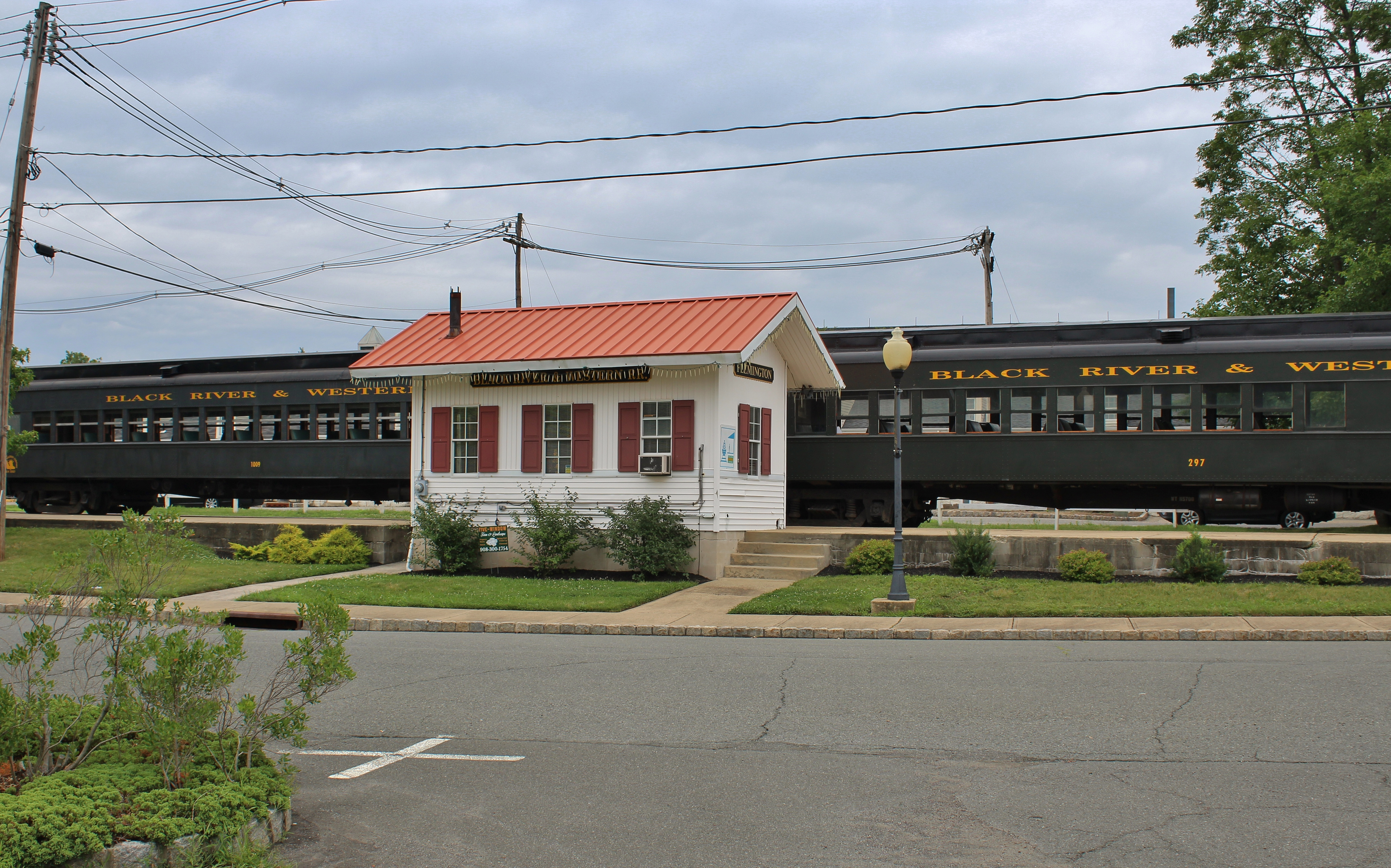
Passenger train at Flemington station.

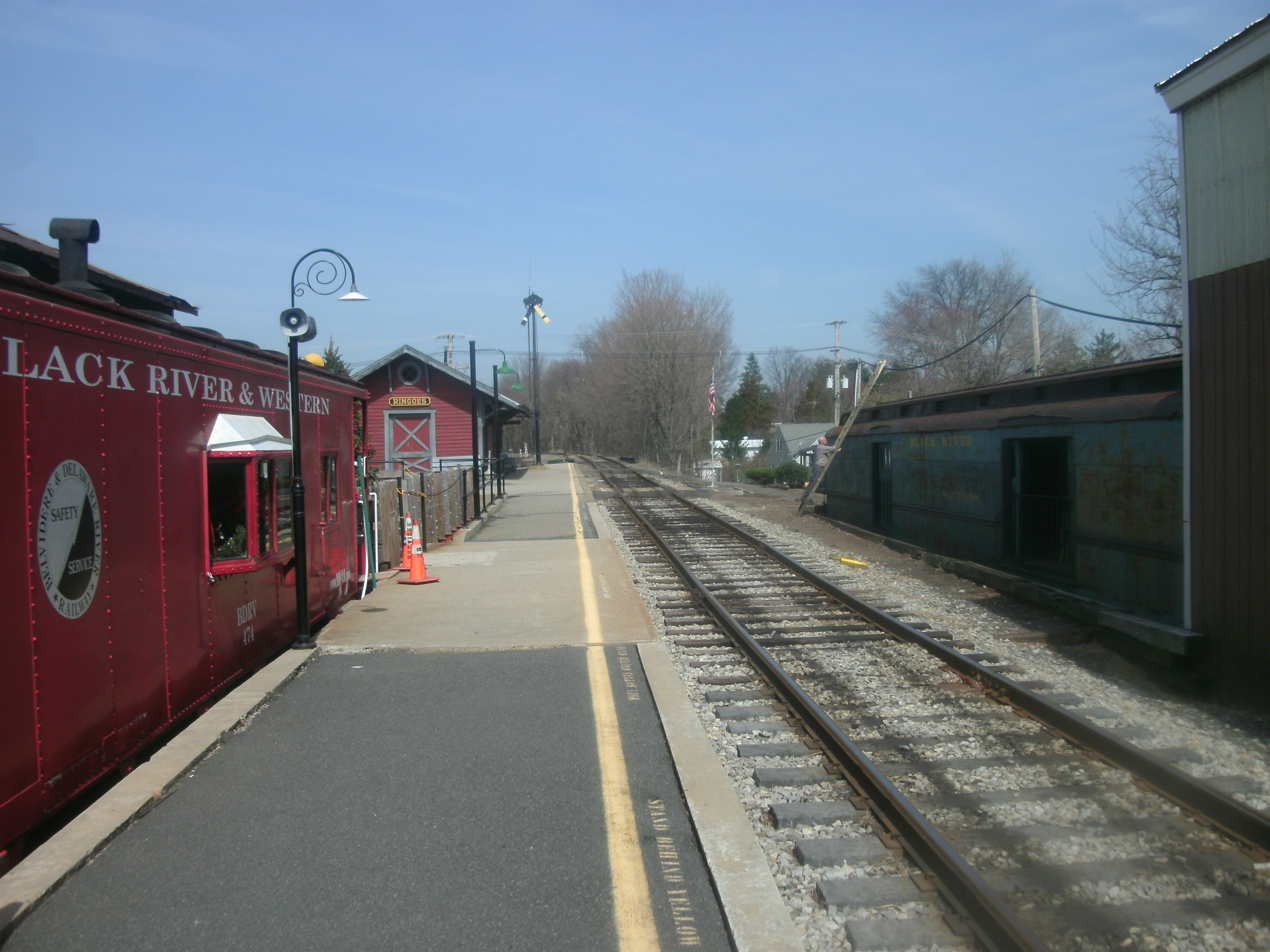
BR&W caboose, semaphore and station depot at the station in Ringoes, New Jersey.

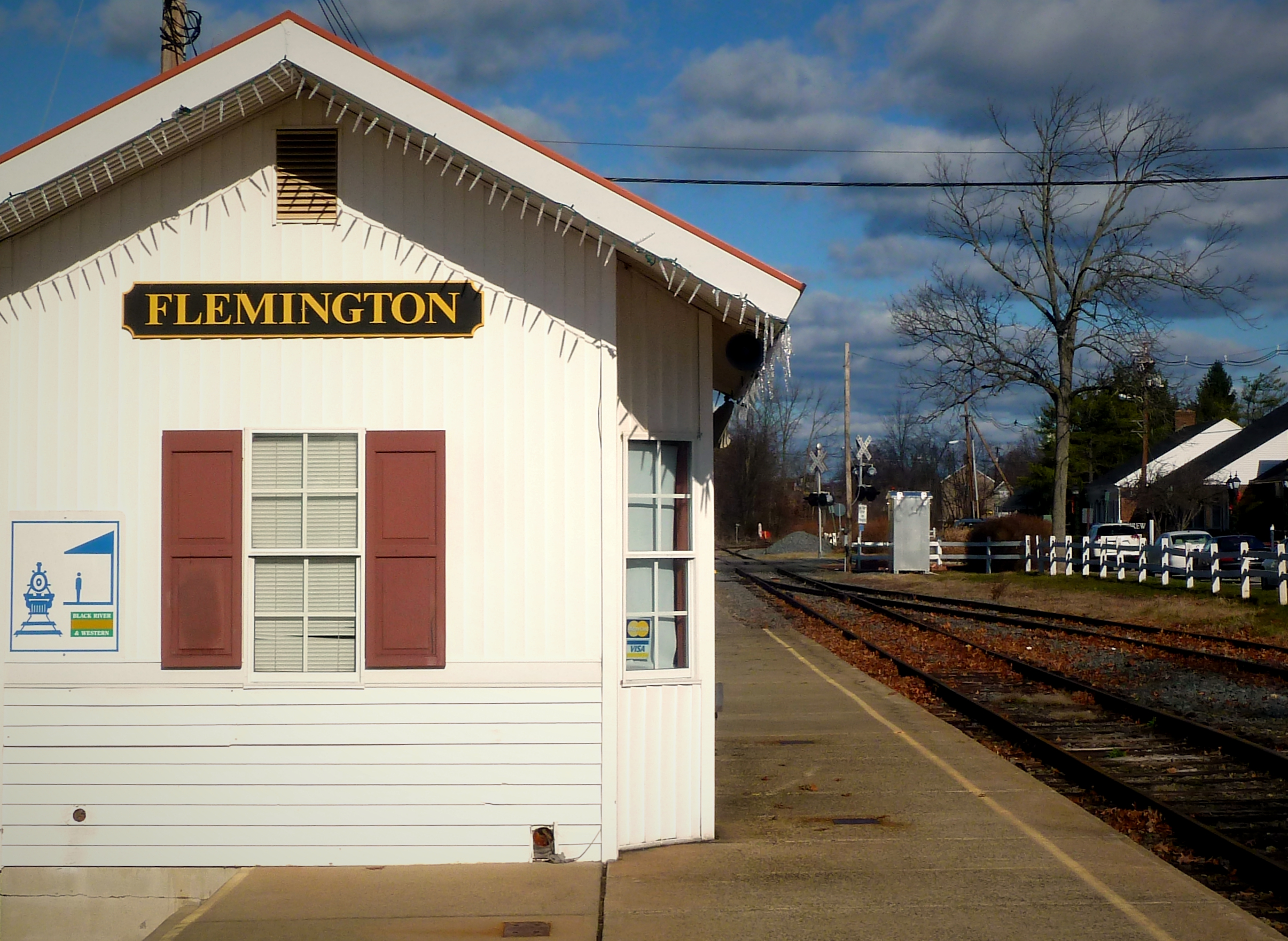
Flemington BRW terminal station.

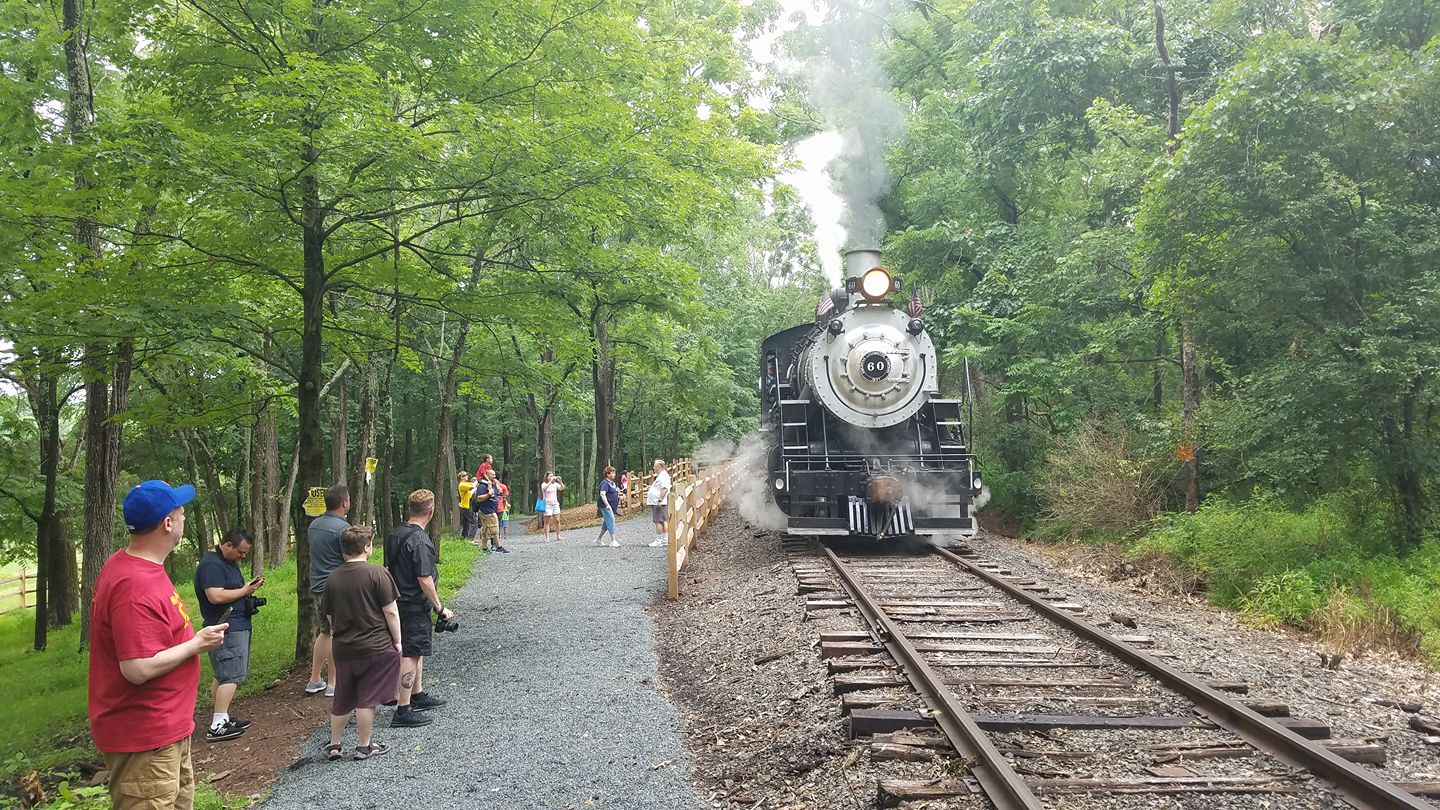
No. 60 at Woodsedge station in 2017.
