= Belvidere and Delaware River Railway =

Class III railroad in the United States

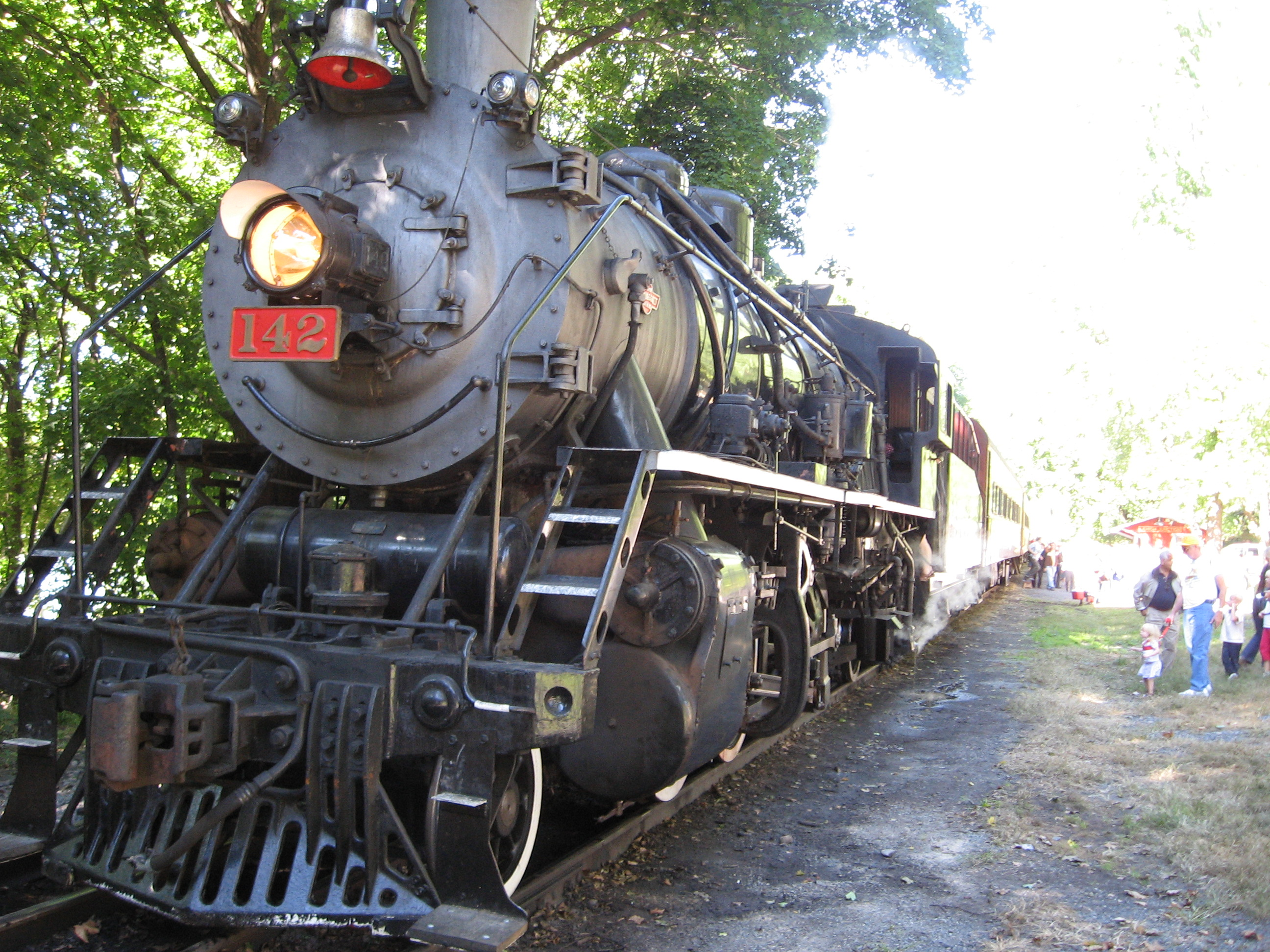
- No. 142 awaiting to depart with an excursion train, September 23, 2007

Overview
- Parent company: Chesapeake and Delaware, LLC
- Headquarters: Phillipsburg, New Jersey
- Reporting mark: BDRV
- Locale: Hunterdon County, New Jersey
- Dates of operation: 1995–present
- Predecessor: Belvidere Delaware Railroad

Technical
- Track gauge: 4 ft 8 1/2 in (1,435 mm) standard gauge
- Length: 16 mi (26 km)

Other
- Website: www.877trainride.com; www.brwrr.com

The Belvidere and Delaware River Railway Company (reporting mark BDRV) also known as Delaware River Railroad or Bel-Del, is a class III railroad in the United States. It was formed in 1995 when the Conrail Delaware Secondary line was purchased by the Black River Railroad System, which operates several railroad services in western New Jersey and eastern Pennsylvania. The Black River Railroad System also owns and operates the Black River and Western Railroad (BR&W). BR&W has leased 10 miles (16 km) of trackage to BDRV since 2004.

The main freight service on the BDRV is south along the Delaware River from Phillipsburg to Carpentersville, a distance of 5 miles (8.0 km) along the Delaware River in New Jersey. Much of the industry currently is lumber and stone. BDRV interchanges with Norfolk Southern Railway (NS) in Phillipsburg, which provides a connection to the National rail network.

Commercial agreements also provide a connection with the Canadian Pacific Railway (CP) at Allentown, Pennsylvania. BDRV is a NS handling carrier, meaning NS haulage rates include delivery to BDRV customers by BDRV. The BDRV, along with BR&W, is part of the Chesapeake and Delaware system, which also includes the newly formed Delaware and Raritan River Railroad out of Jamesburg, New Jersey.

== Original operations ==
The BDRV right-of-way began as a segment of the original Belvidere Delaware Railroad, later controlled by the Pennsylvania Railroad (PRR), Penn Central (PC), and Conrail.

BDRV originally served the James River Paper plant in Milford, New Jersey, assuming the task from Conrail: service to the plant ended in July 2003 when the plant closed. Rail service to a lumber transload continued serving Milford into 2004 when service on this part of the line was finally terminated. Freight service to Corrugated Paper Group (now Georgia Pacific) in nearby Riegelsville, New Jersey terminated in 2005 when the firm switched from railroad to trucking for product shipment.

== Passenger excursions ==
In 2002, the town of Phillipsburg partnered with the BDRV to launch an excursion operation between Phillipsburg and Carpentersville, after the town of Trenton, New Jersey, declined to support the proposed New Jersey Transportation Museum. In March 2003, the BDRV acquired an Ex-New Haven Brill motorcar, M-55, from the Valley Railroad in Essex, Connecticut, and they contracted with the Edward Railway Motor Car Company in Mount Dora, Florida, to have it restored to operating condition. It was subsequently used on the Mt. Dora Scenic Railroad before being moved to the BDRV.

Later in 2003, the New York, Susquehanna and Western (NYSW) Technical and Historical Society joined the partnership, after searching for a place to operate their recently-acquired steam locomotive, No. 142. Ex-NYS&W No. 142 is a China Railways SY class 2-8-2 Mikado steam locomotive built by the Tangshan locomotive works in 1989 for export to the Valley Railroad in Essex, as No. 1647. In late 1991, it was sold to the NYSW, where it was renumbered No. 142, and operated mainline excursions on NYS&W and, on occasion, NJ Transit. In April 2004, No. 142 was ferried from the NYSW's Utica shops and over NJ Transit and Norfolk Southern to Phillipsburg. On May 1, No. 142 hauled the BDRV’s inaugural train.

However, after the loss of the last customer in Riegelsville meant that the railroad could no longer afford to run trains the full length of the line, only being able to run them 4 miles to Carpentersville before shoving back as their track beyond the town was not economical to keep in service, rendering the runaround siding at the former industrial park in Milford inaccessible (this was later removed along with most of the track in Milford).

In recent years, ex-Nickel Plate Road No. 811, an EMD GP9, has been used in frequent service on the line. The NYSW Technical and Historical Society operates their trains with the label "Delaware River Railroad Excursions". All excursions originate out of Lehigh Junction in Phillipsburg with various station stops along the way depending on the season and/or any themed events that may be happening at the time.

In late 2010, the NYSW Technical and Historical Society began clearing the line of vegetation south of Carpentersville, eventually reaching Milford. The borough of Milford hosts a yearly event called "Milford Alive," which has included rail speeder rides on the line.

In May 2023, passenger excursions were restored to Riegelsville, where passengers disembark at a replica Pennsylvania Railroad station that formerly stood on the same site (still under construction). As part of the track improvements to reach Riegelsville a new runaround siding was constructed no longer requiring a four mile shove from Carpentersville back to Phillipsburg.

== Freight operations ==
In 2017, the railroad began running freight service again for its parent company, Chesapeake and Delaware, LLC. The customers served were the Builders FirstSource lumberyard in Phillipsburg, and the Riverline Aggregates quarry in Carpentersville.

== Equipment ==
=== Locomotives ===
Locomotive details
Number	Image	Type	Model	Built	Builder	Status
M-1		Buddliner	RDC1	1950	Budd Company	Under restoration
142		Steam	2-8-2	1989	Tangshan Locomotive and Rolling Stock Works	Operational
146		Diesel	45-ton switcher	1941	GE Transportation	Operational
752		Diesel	GP9	1956	Electro-Motive Diesel	Operational
780		Diesel	GP7	1950	Electro-Motive Diesel	Operational
811		Diesel	GP9	1959	Electro-Motive Diesel	Operational
908		Diesel	SW8	1951	Electro-Motive Diesel	Operational
909		Diesel	SW900	Unknown	Electro-Motive Diesel	Operational
915		Diesel	SW900	1956	Electro-Motive Diesel	Operational
1202		Diesel	SW1500	1956	Electro-Motive Diesel	Operational
1259		Diesel	SW1200RS	1960	Electro-Motive Diesel	Operational
1540		Diesel	SW1500	1973	Electro-Motive Diesel	Operational
1567		Diesel	SW1500	1973	Electro-Motive Diesel	Operational
1596		Diesel	SW1500	1972	Electro-Motive Diesel	Operational
1823		Diesel	GP10	1955	Electro-Motive Diesel	Operational
1848		Diesel	GP9	1954	Electro-Motive Diesel	Out of service
1849		Diesel	GP9	1955	Electro-Motive Diesel	Operational
1850		Diesel	GP9	1956	Electro-Motive Diesel	Operational
1853		Diesel	GP9	1958	Electro-Motive Diesel	Operational
1854		Diesel	GP8	1953	Electro-Motive Diesel	Operational
1856		Diesel	GP10	1955	Electro-Motive Diesel	Operational
1888		Diesel	GP9u	1959	Electro-Motive Diesel	Operational
1889		Diesel	GP9u	1954	Electro-Motive Diesel	Operational
2005		Diesel	GP38-2	1970	Electro-Motive Diesel	Operational
2006		Diesel	GP38-2	1967	Electro-Motive Diesel	Operational
8142		Diesel	SW1200	1959	Electro-Motive Diesel	Operational
8159		Diesel	SW1200	1960	Electro-Motive Diesel	Operational
9009		Diesel	SW900	Unknown	Electro-Motive Diesel	Operational
9581		Diesel	SD9	1955	Electro-Motive Diesel	Operational

=== Former units ===
Locomotive details
Number	Image	Type	Model	Built	Builder	Current owner
M-55		Railcar	Doodlebug	1930	Electro-Motive Diesel	Nevada Northern Railway
