= Chesapeake and Delaware, LLC =

Railroad holding company

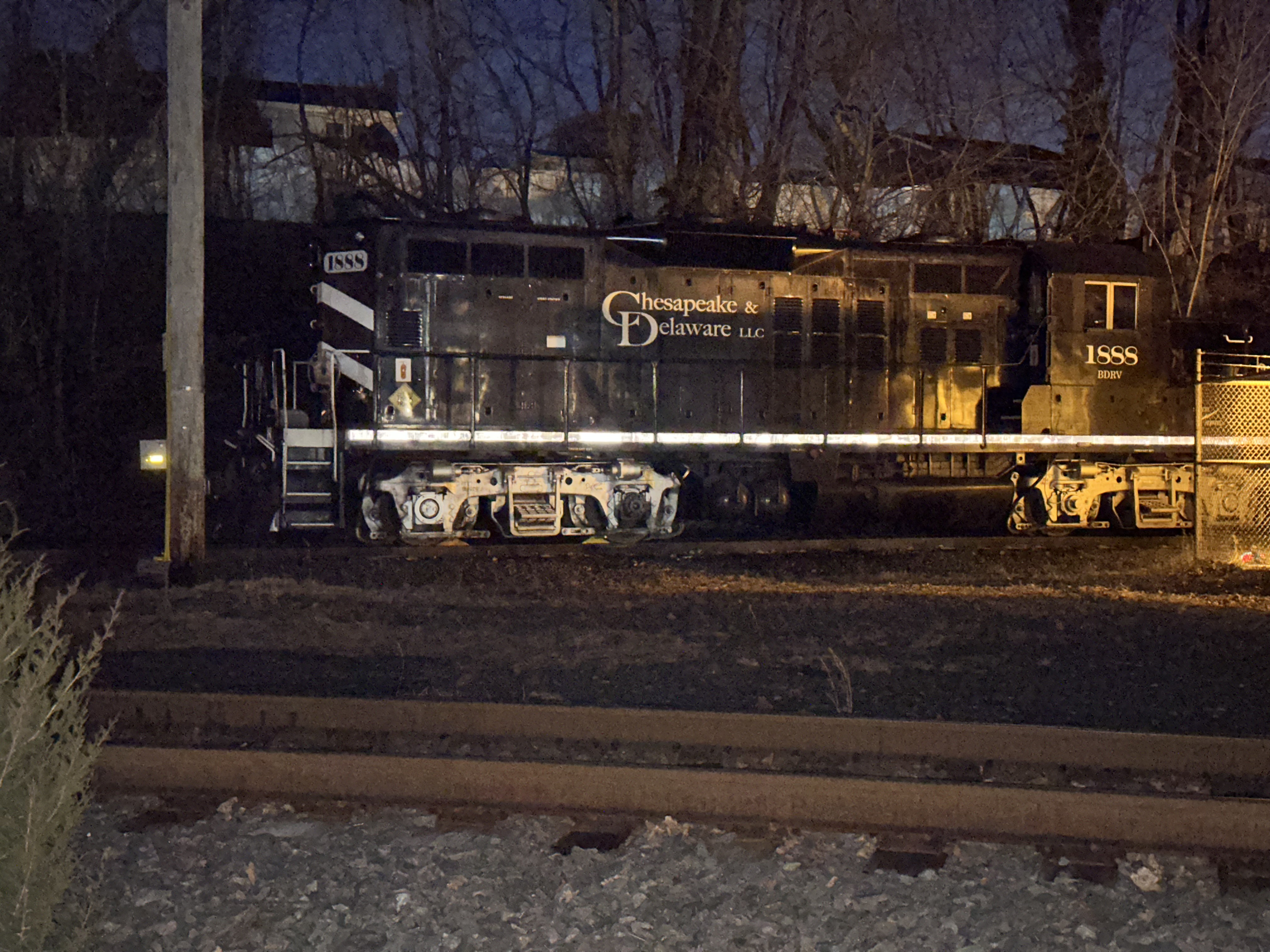
A locomotive of Chesapeake & Delaware LLC, parked on a wye in Jamesburg in 2025

Chesapeake & Delaware, LLC, sometimes known as "C&D", is the parent company or operator of several shortline railroads within the state of New Jersey in the United States. It comprises the following railroads:

- Black River and Western Railroad (BRW)
- Belvidere and Delaware River Railway (BDRV)
- Dover and Delaware River Railroad (DD)
- Dover and Rockaway River Railroad (DRRV)
- Delaware and Raritan River Railroad (DRR)

There are connections from these shortlines to national railroads at a few points.

The formation of Chesapeake & Delaware, LLC occurred in 2016. It is based in the Ringoes section of East Amwell Township, New Jersey. Its president is Kean Burenga.

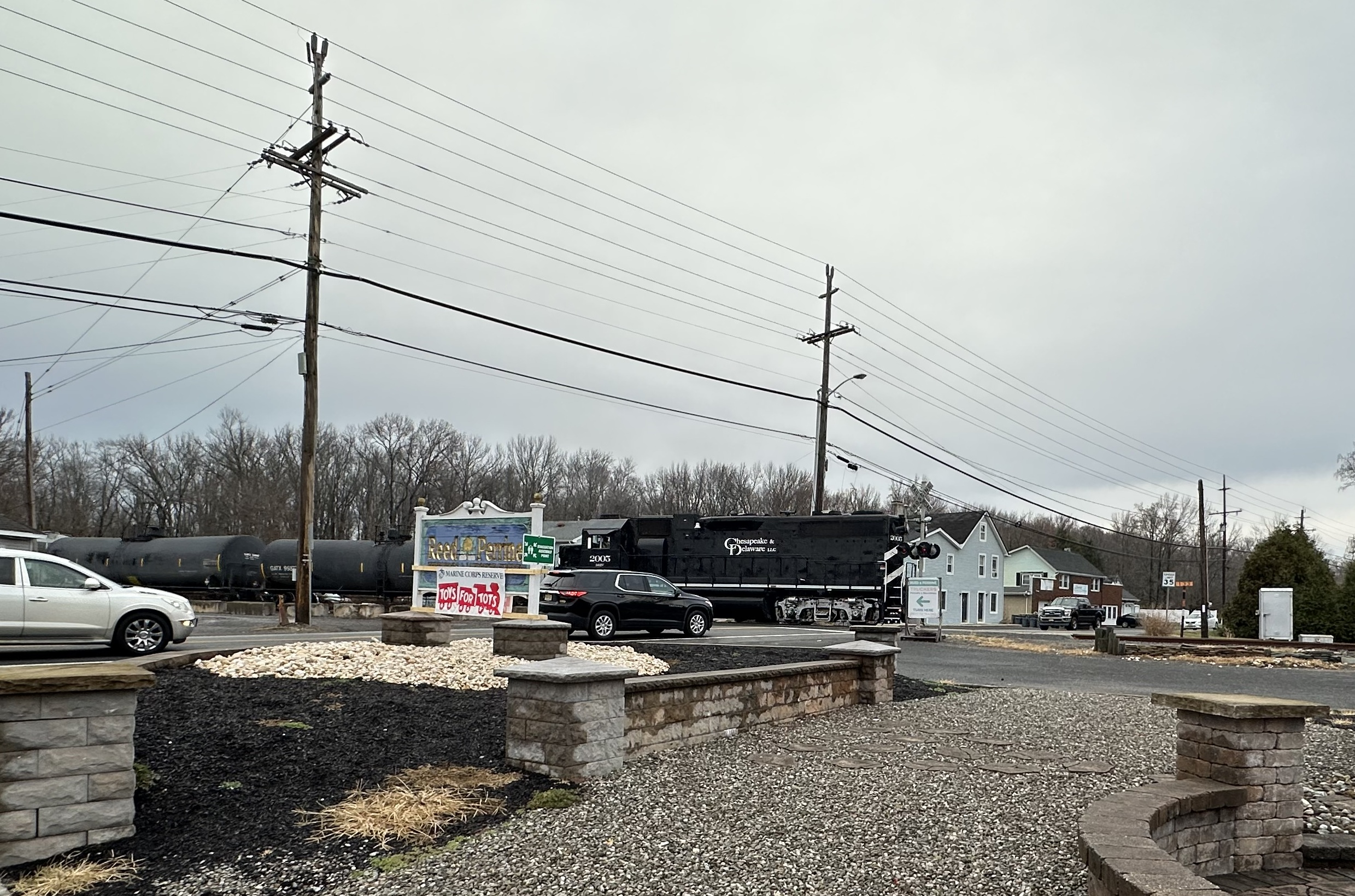
A freight train of the Chesapeake & Delaware LLC, traveling through Manalapan Township in 2024

In 2018, when it was already operating its first three shortlines, the Dover and Rockaway River, the Belvidere and Delaware River, and the Black River and Western, Chesapeake and Delaware, LLC filed application with the federal Surface Transportation Board to begin operating the Dover and Delaware River Railroad on a leased basis from Norfolk Southern. The company is responsible for addressing any problems that occur along the lines of subsidiary railroads. In 2019, Burenga expressed the goal of upgrading infrastructure, in particular to accommodate the larger and heavier freight cars seen on the national rails.

By 2021, Chesapeake and Delaware, LLC was considered to be directly operating the Dover and Delaware River Railroad and the Dover and Rockaway River, while the relationship with the Black River and Western and the Belvidere and Delaware River was on an affiliate basis. The association with the Delaware and Raritan River Railroad began in 2022. Regarding that line, in 2023, Chesapeake and Delaware, LLC completed a revitalization project extending it and improving end connectivity.
