= Harrison Cut-off =

Coordinates: 40.7438°N 74.1248°W

Map

The Harrison Cut-off (also called the "Kingsland-Harrison Bypass", "Harrison Branch", "Kingsland Branch", "Kingsland Cutoff", and "Harrison-Kingsland Branch", as described in the Kearny Vision Plan document) is a substantially abandoned north–south rail line constructed by the Lackawanna Railroad for freight and equipment moves, running between Lyndhurst, New Jersey and Harrison, New Jersey and currently owned by NJ Transit.

Constructed in the mid-1920s, the line formerly connected to the Lackawanna Boonton Branch (currently, the NJ Transit Main Line) via a wye in Lyndhurst named "Secaucus Junction" (apparently because either it was the first junction north of Secaucus station/yard, or because its southernmost leg, running east–west, allowed trains traveling north from Harrison to turn southeast toward Secaucus station/yard -- no relation to the present Secaucus Junction station) that allowed both lines access to the Kingsland Shops near the Kingsland station in Lyndhurst. It also formerly connected to the DL&W-controlled Morris & Essex Railroad (currently, the Morris & Essex Lines) at a Harrison Junction/Harrison Railyard, west of Kearny Junction near the border of Harrison and Kearny, New Jersey.

The main benefit to M&E rail equipment was a shorter (and less busy) route to access the Kingsland Shops than going all the way to West End Junction (Jersey City) and up the Boonton Branch.

In 2007, the town of Kearny hired the Regional Plan Association to create a proposal to the state of New Jersey to reactivate the line and build a transit village for Kearny, restoring service to the town that had been lost in 2002 with the closure of the deteriorating DB Draw bridge and the construction of the Montclair Connection, switching the route of the Boonton Line (renamed to Montclair-Boonton Line) south of Walnut Street in Montclair off the former Erie Greenwood Lake to use the DL&W Montclair Branch.

Norfolk Southern (and its predecessor Conrail) occasionally delivered freight to industrial customers at the north and south ends of the line. NS had removed the southwest leg of that wye, and reconfigured the southeast leg to point southwest.
