= Dover and Delaware River Railroad =

Overview
- Parent company: Chesapeake and Delaware, LLC
- Headquarters: Ringoes, New Jersey
- Reporting mark: DD
- Locale: Northern New Jersey
- Dates of operation: 2019–present

Technical
- Track gauge: 4 ft 8 1/2 in (1,435 mm) standard gauge
- Length: 190 miles (310 km)

Other
- Website: https://www.cadrailroads.com/

The Dover and Delaware River Railroad (reporting mark DD) is a short-line railroad operating along 109 miles (175 km) of track in the northern part of the U.S. state of New Jersey between Phillipsburg and Newark. It was created in 2019 to take over local freight operations from Norfolk Southern Railway between Phillipsburg and Newark, leasing and operating the Washington Secondary line between Phillipsburg and Hackettstown from Norfolk Southern Railway and acquiring trackage rights along NJ Transit's Morristown Line, Montclair–Boonton Line, and Gladstone Branch. The railroad also acquired small stretches of track in Washington, Wayne, and Totowa. The Dover and Delaware River Railroad interchanges with Norfolk Southern Railway in Phillipsburg. The DD is a wholly owned subsidiary of Chesapeake and Delaware, LLC.
