= Belvidere Delaware Railroad =

Belvidere-Delaware Railroad

Overview
- Operator: Belvidere and Delaware River Railway
- Headquarters: Trenton, New Jersey
- Locale: New Jersey
- Dates of operation: 1851–1871 (as an independent operator), 1957 (on paper)
- Successor: United New Jersey Railroad and Canal Company

Technical
- Track gauge: 4 ft 8 1/2 in (1,435 mm) standard gauge
- Length: 68 mi (109 km)

The Belvidere-Delaware Railroad (Bel-Del, 1851–1871) was a railroad running along the eastern shore of the Delaware River from Trenton, New Jersey north via Phillipsburg, New Jersey to Manunka Chunk, New Jersey. It became an important feeder line for the Lehigh Valley Railroad's join to the Central Railroad of New Jersey, which was constructed into Phillipsburg, New Jersey, at about the same time. This connected Philadelphia and Trenton, New Jersey at one end of the shortline railroad to the rapidly growing lower Wyoming Valley region, and via the Morris Canal or the CNJ, a slow or fast connection to New York City ferries crossing New York Harbor from Jersey City, New Jersey.

In 1871, the CNJ leased various railroads in Pennsylvania, most from the Lehigh Coal & Navigation Company allowing the CNJ to penetrate to the upper Wyoming Valley, over some stretches, competing directly with the Lehigh Valley Railroad and with the Lehigh Canal and the trunk road connection of the Belvidere Delaware Railroad to New York became less profitable since Philadelphia connected more easily to Northeastern Pennsylvania thereafter without needing a double-crossing of the Delaware River; a general revenue decline ensued, leading to the Pennsylvania Railroad acquiring the rights, where it served as part of the Pennsylvania Railroad (PRR) system, carrying mainly anthracite coal and iron ore from northeastern Pennsylvania to population centers along the coast.

== History ==
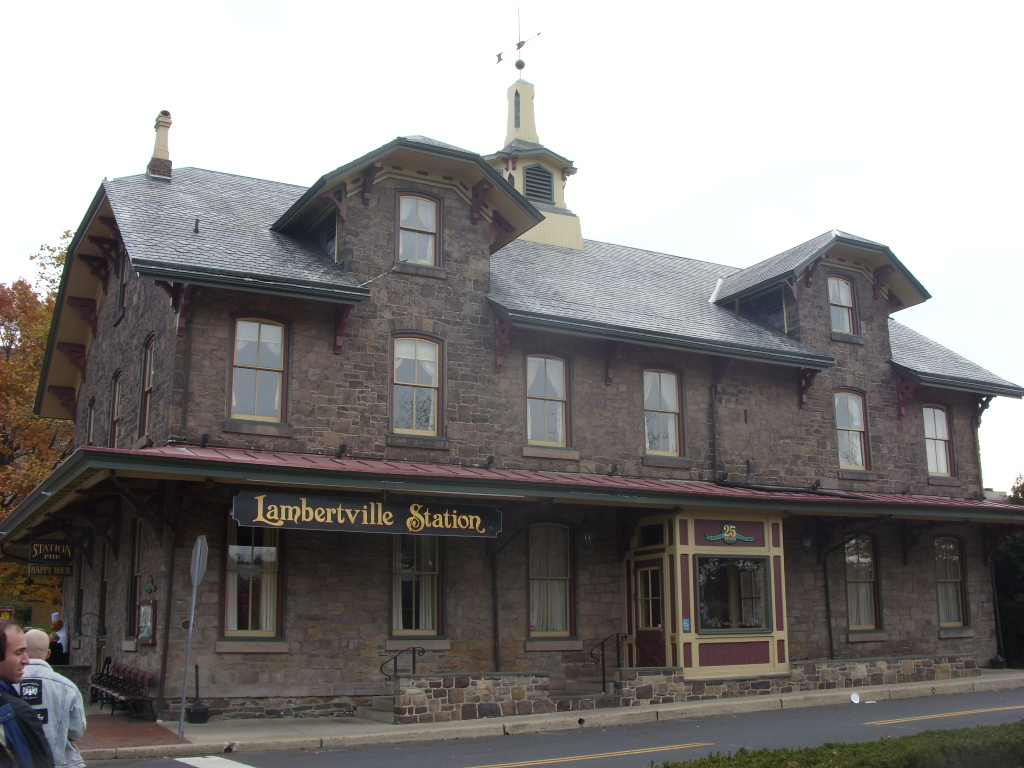
Lambertville station

=== Early history ===
The Belvidere-Delaware Railroad was chartered on March 2, 1836 and was constructed between 1850 and 1855 from Trenton along the Delaware River north to Belvidere, New Jersey. The Trenton-Lambertville section opened on February 6, 1851, eventually reaching Belvidere on November 5, 1855.

On June 7, 1854, the Bel-Del agreed to operate the Flemington Railroad and Transportation Company, where a connection was made with the Central Railroad of New Jersey (CNJ) at Flemington, New Jersey. LV coal trains began using the Bel-Del in January 1856, joining the Bel-Del by the LV's bridge over the Delaware River where it connected in Phillipsburg, New Jersey. An extension was then completed in 1864 that gave the Bel-Del access to the Delaware, Lackawanna and Western Railroad (DL&W) at Manunka Chunk, and permitted trains to operate via trackage rights to East Stroudsburg, Pennsylvania through the Delaware Water Gap. The Pennsylvania Railroad (PRR) began operating the Bel Del as the Belvidere Division of the United Railroads of New Jersey Grand Division in 1871 and purchased the line soon afterwards. The Flemington Railroad & Transportation Company then merged into the Bel-Del on February 16, 1885. For much of the late 19th century and early 20th century the railroad line proved vitally useful.

In 1882, the Lehigh and Hudson River Railway made a deal with PRR to operate on the Bel-Del between Phillipsburg and Belvidere where L&HR's track to Maybrook, New York connects.

By the 1950s, steam locomotives had been replaced with diesel operated self-propelled doodlebugs as a cost-saving measure resulting from dwindling patronage.

In August 1955, flood waters from the Delaware River caused by Hurricane Diane washed out portions of the line north of Belvidere near where the right-of-way crosses modern-day US Route 46, although the line still remains active south of this point to serve the Hoffmann-LaRoche pharmaceutical plant. North of where the plant is now to the junction at Manunka Chunk, the line was subsequently removed in late 1955. On December 31, 1957, the Bel-Del was merged into the United New Jersey Railroad and Canal Company, with passenger services ending on October 26, 1960.

Heritage operator Black River & Western Railroad (BR&W) began leasing the Flemington Branch from PRR on weekends to operate steam excursions. As part of the leasing agreement, BR&W was required to pay PRR for all track expenses, totalling $5,000. Trains began operating between Flemington and Lambertville by May 16, 1965.

=== Decline ===
The PRR merged with rival New York Central Railroad in 1968 to form the Penn Central (PC), which fell apart faster than it came together. PC remnants were absorbed by Conrail in April 1976, which treated the Bel-Del as a dispensable secondary line. The chief function of the Bel-Del — bringing coal and iron ore between the LV connection at Phillipsburg with the PRR system — had long since ceased. The main priority freight trains were rerouted to other lines. With little industry remaining between Trenton and Lambertville, Conrail had little use for the line. Though the south end of line passed within a few hundred yards from the central business district and state capitol complex in Trenton, no official interest in taking advantage of the line's passenger potential was raised. To preserve track from possible future abandonment, the BR&W purchased approximately three miles of track in the Lambertville area to continue to serve several freight customers located in town. (The BR&W had already purchased the 11-mile line between Flemington and Lambertville from PC in March 1970 for $153,000, equal to $1,238,815 today.) The Trenton-Lambertville segment was abandoned in March 1977.

While the Trenton-Lambertville segment was not included in their system, Conrail retained the rest of the line from Lambertville to Belvidere, renaming it their Delaware Secondary. Conrail ceased interchanging at Lambertville with BR&W in January 1977 when a new connection opened at Three Bridges, and with freight business drying up in Frenchtown, they eventually abandoned the line south of Milford to Lambertville by January 1979 after running a signal removal train on the Milford-Lambertville segment in November 1978. Track removal began in the summer of 1979 and ended in the spring of 1982. In those three years Conrail dismantled approximately 31 miles of the line. The former railroad bed was converted for use as part of the Delaware & Raritan Canal Trail.

=== Current ===
Conrail later sold the Phillipsburg-Milford section to the newly formed Belvidere and Delaware River Railway (BDRV) in 1995. In 1998, BR&W ceased regular operations into Lambertville when track was demoted to excepted prohibiting the continuation of passenger trains on that segment of the line. Freight service was non-existent by the late 1990s. Service trains operated over the Ringoes-Lambertville portion on a seldom basis until 2002. BDRV served a paper plant south of Milford, New Jersey, until 2003 when the paper plant closed. The line south of Carpentersville was soon after closed to Riegelsville in 2005 when another paper plant decided to not continue using rail service. Flooding also partially damaged the line in the Riegelsville area at the time.

The New York Susquehanna & Western Historical & Technical Society (NYS&WH&TS) started running passenger trains in 2004 between Phillipsburg and Carpentersville and has since become a successful operation. In recent years both the NYSWHTS and the Black River Railroad Historical Trust (the entity that now runs passenger trains on BR&W) have been gradually restoring the dormant Milford and Lambertville lines. Norfolk Southern (NS) retains ownership of the Phillipsburg-Belvidere main line after the Conrail split of 1999 with CSX Transportation. They continue to use the line serving several customers in Martins Creek accessed by the former Lehigh and New England Railroad Martins Creek Branch, Roxburg via a spur over the river and Belvidere. NS also interchanges with the Delaware-Lackawanna Railroad in Portland, PA, via the former Delaware, Lackawanna and Western Railroad Bangor-Portland Division.

=== Former stations ===
==== Pennsylvania ====
- East Stroudsburg (via trackage rights over DL&W)

==== New Jersey ====
- Manunka Chunk
- Belvidere
- Foul Rift
- Roxburg
- Hutchinson
- Brainards
- Harmony
- Phillipsburg
- Lehigh Junction
- Carpentersville
- Riegelsville
- Holland
- Milford
- Frenchtown
- Kingwood
- Tumble Falls
- Byram
- Raven Rock
- Stockton
- Lambertville
- Moore
- Titusville
- Washington's Crossing
- Somerset
- Scudder Falls
- Wilburtha
- Dix Haven
- Cadwalader Park
- Trenton (on PRR New York Division, today's Amtrak Northeast Corridor)

Flemington Branch (current BR&W)

- Lambertville (on Bel-Del mainline)
- Alexauken
- Mount Airy
- Bowne
- Boss Road
- Ringoes
- Copper Hill
- Muirheid
- Flemington
