= Carpentersville, New Jersey =

Populated place in Warren County, New Jersey, US

- Unincorporated community
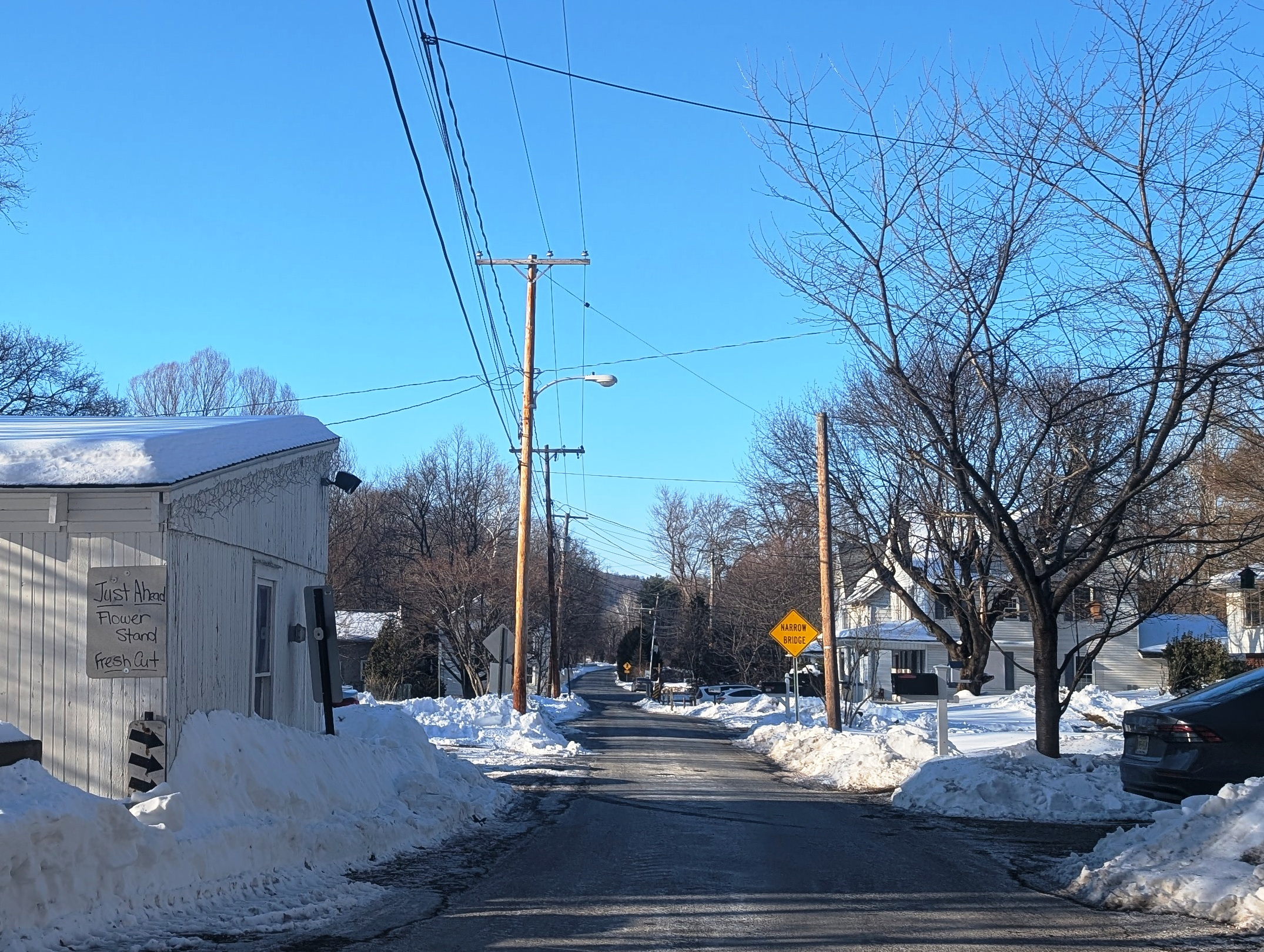
- River Road northbound in Carpentersville

- Location of Carpentersville within Warren County, New Jersey Carpentersville (New Jersey) Carpentersville (the United States)
- Coordinates: 40°38′09″N 75°11′19″W
- Country: United States
- State: New Jersey
- County: Warren
- Township: Pohatcong
- Named after: Jacob Carpenter
- Elevation: 161 ft (49 m)
- Time zone: UTC−05:00 (Eastern (EST))
  - Summer (DST): UTC−04:00 (EDT)
- GNIS feature ID: 875216

Carpentersville is an unincorporated community located in Pohatcong Township in Warren County, in the U.S. state of New Jersey.

Carpentersville is located on the east bank of the Delaware River, 6 mi (9.7 km) south of Phillipsburg. Pohatcong Creek flows into the Delaware River south of Carpentersville.

== History ==
The settlement is named for Jacob Carpenter, a Swiss immigrant who settled here in 1748. Roper's Ferry operated across the Delaware River as early as 1769.

The Belvidere-Delaware Railroad reached Carpentersville in 1854 and built a station in the area. The passenger stop remained in commercial operation until 1952. The railroad line is still in operation today at the hamlet owned by the newer 1995 company Belvidere and Delaware River Railway. By 1882, Carpentersville had saw and grist mills, a post office, and ten lime kilns.

Delaware River Drive, a New Jersey state highway which existed from 1911 to 1916, passed through Carpentersville.
