= Passaic Junction =

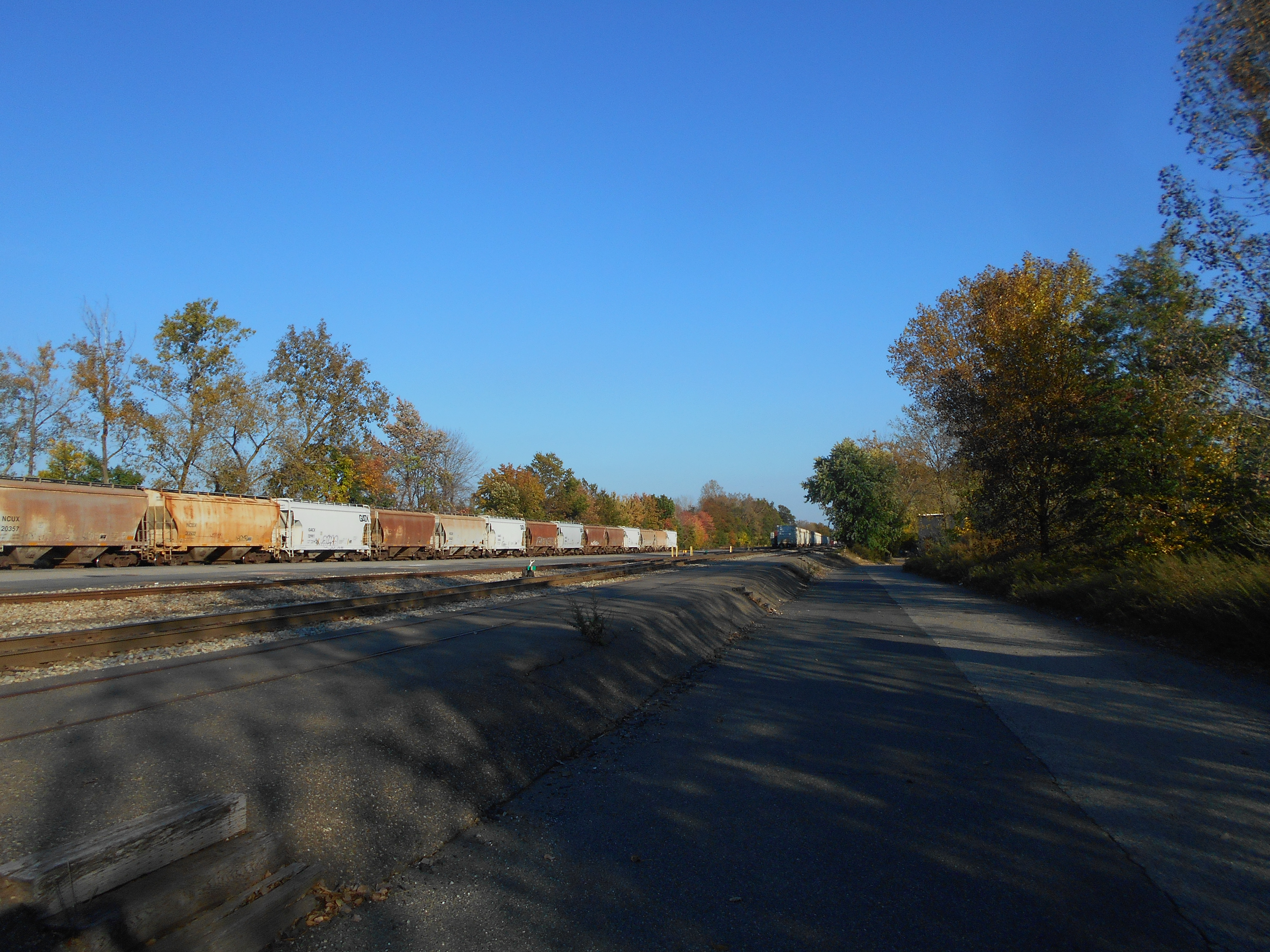
- The former Passaic Junction station for the New York, Susquehanna and Western Railroad in Saddle Brook, New Jersey

- Location of Passaic Junction in Bergen County, New Jersey
- Coordinates: 40°54′08″N 74°06′15″W
- Country: United States
- State: New Jersey
- County: Bergen
- Borough: Elmwood Park and Saddle Brook
- Elevation: 52 ft (16 m)
- Time zone: UTC-5 (Eastern (EST))
  - Summer (DST): UTC-4 (EDT)
- GNIS feature ID: 879158

Passaic Junction is a rail yard owned by New York, Susquehanna and Western Railway along the border of Elmwood Park and Saddle Brook in Bergen County, New Jersey, United States. The yard is also known by its telegraph call 'PC'. In the late 19th century, this area had been known as Coalburg Junction. The yard has a connection to and is the official interchange location with Norfolk Southern. Used as a customer car storage yard but has been surrounded by a few small industries. A team track is also located here.

At the west end of the yard beyond the Bergen County Line overhead crossing is Passaic Branch junction.

== See also ==
- List of New Jersey railroad junctions
