= Sentetsu Keha class railcars =

Railcar

Sentetsu Keha class
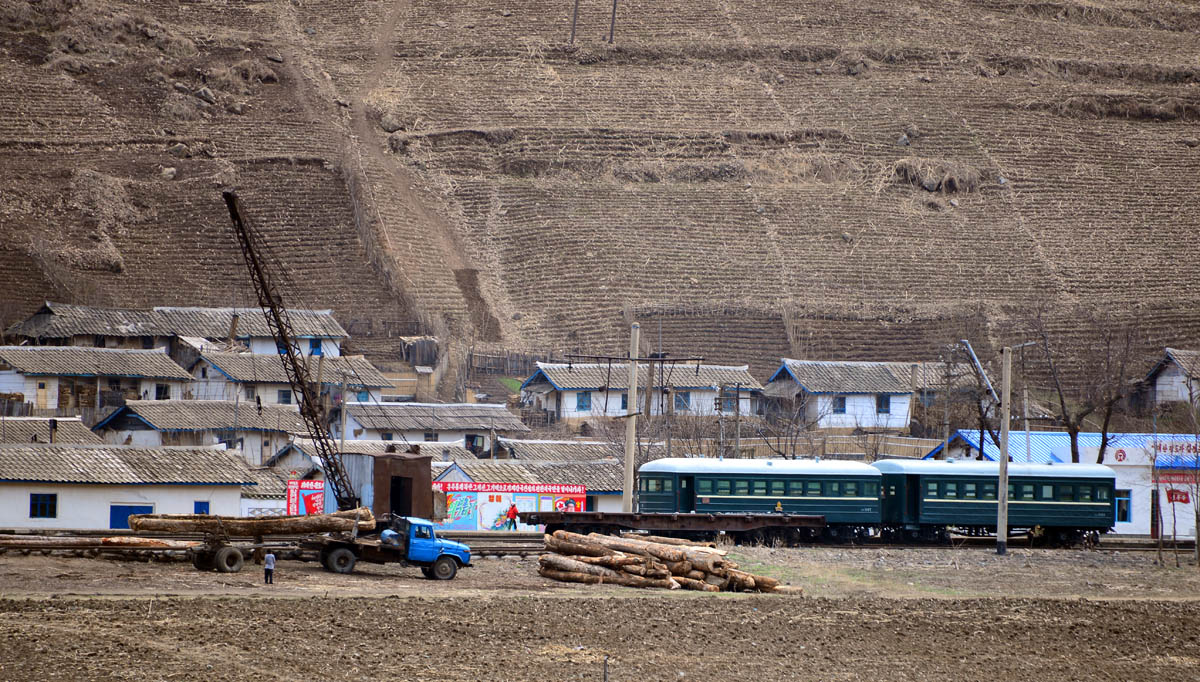
- A Gyeongseong-built Keha railcar seen in service on the Pukbunaeryuk Line in North Korea with the Korean State Railway in 2012.
- Operators: Chosen Government Railway; Korean National Railroad; Korean State Railway

Specifications
- Engine type: Petrol railcar
- Track gauge: 1,435 mm (4 ft 8 1/2 in)

The Keha (Japanese ケハ, Korean 게하) class railcars were a group of 3rd class petrol-powered railcars of the Chosen Government Railway (Sentetsu). There were five types of such railcars, built in Japan and Korea. The exact classification and numbering of these railcars is not certain; certain is only that their type designation was Keha. After the end of the war they were inherited by the Korean State Railway in North Korea and by the Korean National Railroad in South Korea.

== Chosen Government Railway ==
The first petrol railcars in Korea were the narrow-gauge Nakeha class and the Keha1 and Keha2 class standard-gauge railcars which entered service with Sentetsu in 1930.

The Keha1 and Keha2 class railcars were built for Sentetsu in 1930 by Maruyama Sharyō and Nippon Sharyō respectively. These semi-streamlined railcars, powered by a 107 hp (80 kW) Waukesha Motor Company type 6RB 6-cylinder petrol engine mounted under the floor, were of lightweight construction, weighing 25 t (25 long tons; 28 short tons); they were 20 m (66 ft) in length and had a maximum speed of 70 km/h (43 mph). They had seats for 100 passengers, and the interiors were well received by the travelling public. They were a success, and more were ordered.

Following the success of the first six petrol railcars, Sentetsu put another 21 into service in the next two years, with the Gyeongseong Works delivering eleven (numbered 15 through 25) in 1931 and ten more in 1932 (numbered 26 through 35). These were also powered by the Waukesha 6RB engine and seated 100, but they were shorter than the first six cars. The passenger compartment was heated by hot water pipes connected to a boiler in the goods compartment. They were equipped with both air and hand brakes, and the air compressor had a multiple V-belt drive. Driving cabs were located at both ends of the railcar. It is not known what their new numbers and classification became in Sentetsu's 1938 general renumbering, but some eventually were numbered in the 70-79 range.

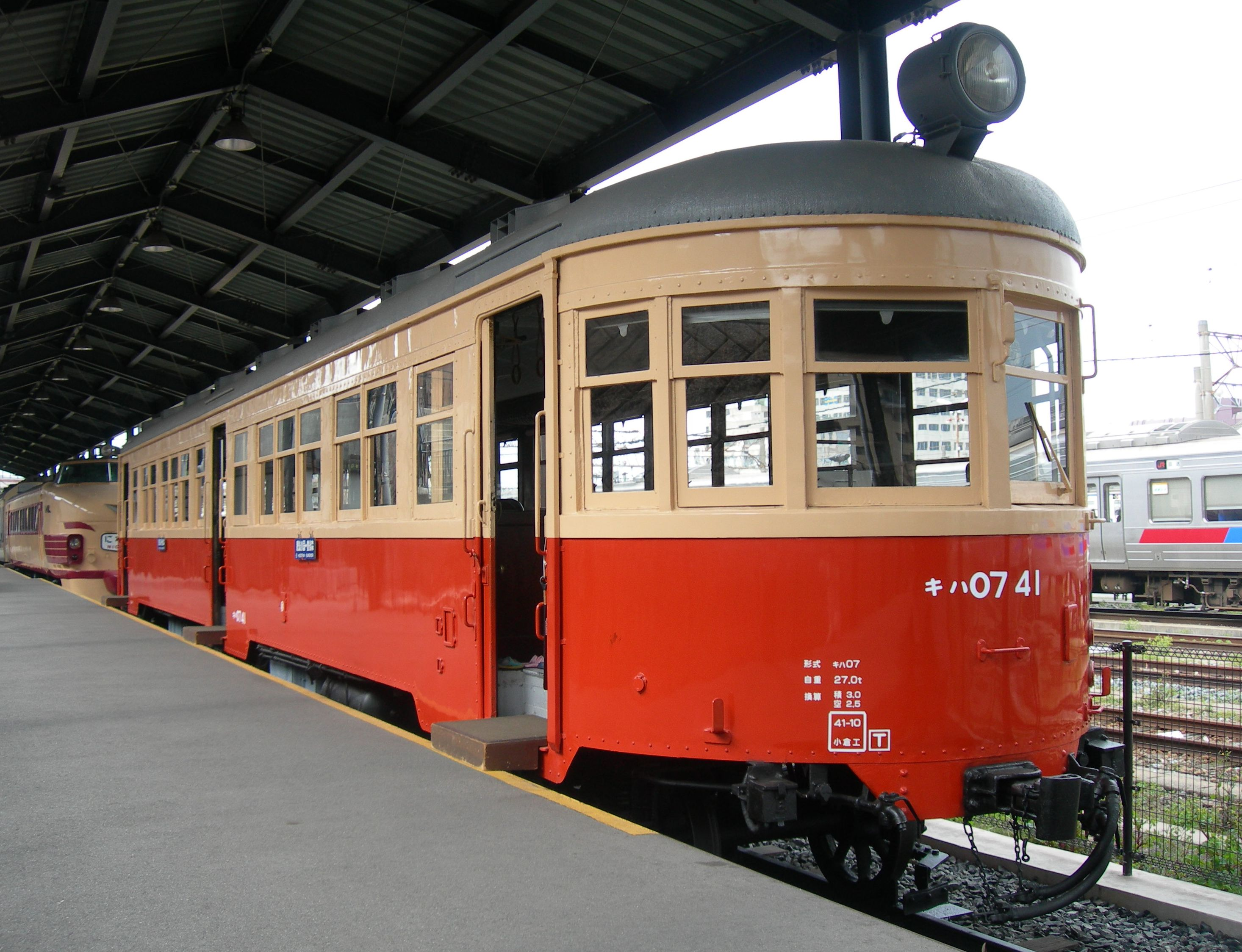
JNR Kiha07 -class railcar, very similar in appearance to the Nippon Sharyō railcar built for Sentetsu in 1934.

In 1934, a single railcar built by Nippon Sharyō was put into service, which were very similar in appearance to the Japan National Railways Kiha07-class railcars, and in 1936 the Gyeongseong Works built a single railcar (numbered 1) for company use. This railcar could carry 20 passengers and had a conference room with a table. Mechanically, they were basically the same as the passenger version, but it was nearly 4 m (13 ft) shorter.

Nippon Sharyō delivered five 100-passenger railcars of a new design. Powered by a 170 hp (130 kW) Kawasaki KP170B 6-cylinder engine, they were intended for use on mountainous lines. Finally, in 1942, an uncertain number, probably seven, of railcars of yet another design were built by Nippon Sharyō.

All of these railcars had a single powered axle (1A-A1 wheel arrangement). Those built in 1930 used a 12V generator, but all subsequent ones used 24V, after Sentetsu opted to standardise with the L3-type 24V, 900W axle-mounted generator.

Timeline of Sentetsu petrol railcar deliveries
Year	Builder	Quantity	Numbers	Notes
1930	Nippon Sharyō, Maruyama	6		Keha1, Keha2. Total from each builder unknown.
Mar 1931	Gyeongseong Works	2	15, 16	"Standard" design
Aug 1931	Gyeongseong Works	9	17–25	"Standard" design
May 1932	Gyeongseong Works	6	26–31	"Standard" design
July 1932	Gyeongseong Works	4	32–35	"Standard" design
1934	Nippon Sharyō	1		Unique streamlined railcar
1936	Gyeongseong Works	1	1	Short railcar for official use
1938	Nippon Sharyō	5		More powerful railcars for use on mountain lines
1942	Nippon Sharyō	7?		Final petrol car, unique design, non-streamlined

== Korean National Railroad ==
At the time of Liberation, 31 of 60 railcars of all types (steam, diesel and both standard- and narrow-gauge petrol) were left in the South; these were subsequently operated by the Korean National Railroad. Around 1954, the KNR renumbered its standard gauge railcars into the 100 series. The petrol railcars were retired between 1957 and 1963, replaced by the DC-class diesel-hydraulic railcars, and all were scrapped.

Identified KNR 100-series standard gauge railcars
Number	Builder	Build year
102	Nippon Sharyō	1934
103	Gyeongseong Works	1931–32
106	Gyeongseong Works	1931–32

== Korean State Railway ==
Very little is known about the service lives of the 29 railcars that remained in the North after the partition of Korea and were inherited by the Korean State Railway, but at least one Gyeongseong-built unit was seen in service on the Pukbunaeryuk Line in 2012; its number is unknown.
