= Sentetsu Pashi class locomotives =

Meta-class of 5 Korean 4-6-2 locomotive classes

Sentetsu Pashi class
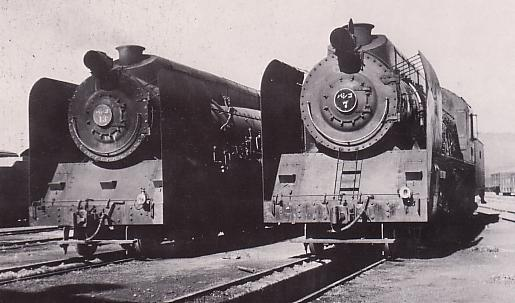
- Sentetsu Pashiko class locomotives パシコ7 and パシコ13
Type and origin
- Power type: Steam
Specifications
- Configuration
  - Whyte: 4-6-2
- Gauge: 1,435 mm (4 ft 8 1/2 in)

The Pashi or Pasi (Japanese パシ, Korean 파시) class locomotives were a group made up of five distinct classes of steam tender locomotives built for the Chosen Government Railway (Sentetsu) with 4-6-2 wheel arrangement. The "Pashi" name came from the American naming system for steam locomotives, under which locomotives with 4-6-2 wheel arrangement were called "Pacific".

As the 1920s approached, it became clear that Sentetsu needed more powerful locomotives than its existing Amei-class and Teho-type locomotives to pull its important passenger trains. Consequently, Sentetsu turned to the Baldwin Locomotive Works once again, this time ordering passenger steam locomotives of the 4-6-2 wheel arrangement. Satisfied with these, another six were imported from the United States, this time from ALCo, in 1923. In the same year, Kisha Seizō of Japan built six copies of the Baldwin design and Kawasaki built six more of a similar design; these became the first Pashi type locomotives to be built domestically, and signalled the end of locomotive imports from overseas. All further Pashi type locomotives were built in Japan and Korea.

In total, there were 144 Pashi type locomotives of five distinct classes built for Sentetsu:

- Pashii
- Pashini
- Pashisa
- Pashishi
- Pashiko

Of these, the Pashishi class was the most numerous, and the Pashiko class was the heaviest and fastest steam locomotive ever to be operated by a Korean railway company.

Following the end of the Pacific War and the subsequent partition of Korea in 1945, these locomotives were all divided between the Korean National Railroad in the South and the Korean State Railway in the North; of the 141 Pashi-class locomotives that survived the war, 73 went to the South and 68 to the North at the time of the division. In the South, the KNR used them on passenger trains into the late 1960s; the last ones were retired around 1971. Little of their service lives in the North is known; with the great emphasis placed on electrification of trunk lines in the DPRK in the 1950s and 1960s, and the service introduction of the Red Flag 1-class electric locomotives from January 1962, by the end of the 1960s the bulk of North Korea's trunk lines had been electrified, and steam power had been mostly relegated to the secondary lines, so it is likely that North Korean Pashi-class locomotives did not last much longer in service than those in the South.

The Pashishi class was also built for the Central China Railway in Japanese-occupied China, and by the China Railway after the Liberation of China.
