= Sentetsu Pashini-class locomotive =

4-6-2 steam locomotive

Chosen Government Railway Pashini class (パシニ) Korean State Railway Pasidu class (바시두)
Type and origin
- Power type: Steam
- Builder: ALCo
- Build date: 1923
- Total produced: 6
Specifications
- Configuration
  - Whyte: 4-6-2
- Gauge: 1,435 mm (4 ft 8 1/2 in)
- Driver dia.: 1,750 mm (69 in)
- Length: 22,060 mm (869 in)
- Width: 3,054 mm (10 ft 0.2 in)
- Height: 4,228 mm (13 ft 10.5 in)
- Loco weight: 90.40 t (88.97 long tons)
- Tender weight: 57.50 t (56.59 long tons)
- Fuel capacity: 9.4 t (9.3 long tons)
- Water cap.: 22,700 L (6,000 US gal)
- Firebox
  - Grate area: 4.36 m^{2} (46.9 sq ft)
- Boiler
  - Small tubes: 168 x 51 mm (2.0 in)
  - Large tubes: 26 x 137 mm (5.4 in)
- Boiler pressure: 13.0 kgf/cm^{2} (185 psi)
- Heating surface
  - Firebox: 17.00 m^{2} (183.0 sq ft)
  - Tubes: 208.90 m^{2} (2,248.6 sq ft)
  - Total surface: 225.90 m^{2} (2,431.6 sq ft)
- Superheater
  - Heating area: 61.20 m^{2} (658.8 sq ft)
- Cylinders: 1
- Cylinder size: 610 mm × 660 mm (24 in × 26 in)
- Valve gear: Walschaerts
Performance figures
- Maximum speed: 95 km/h (59 mph)
- Tractive effort: 140.0 kN (31,500 lb_{f})
Career
- Operators: Chosen Government Railway; Korean State Railway
- Class: Sentetsu: パシニ; KSR: 바시두
- Number in class: Sentetsu: 6 KSR: 6
- Numbers: Sentetsu: パシニ1–パシニ6; KSR: 바시두1–바시두6
- Delivered: 1923

The Pashini class (パシニ) locomotives were a group of steam tender locomotives of the Chosen Government Railway (Sentetsu) with 4-6-2 wheel arrangement. The "Pashi" name came from the American naming system for steam locomotives, under which locomotives with 4-6-2 wheel arrangement were called "Pacific".

In all, Sentetsu owned 144 locomotives of all Pashi classes, of which 141 survived the war; of these, 73 went to the Korean National Railroad in South Korea and 68 to the Korean State Railway in North Korea.

== Description ==
Following the success of the Pashii class, Sentetsu took delivery of six locomotives from ALCo of the United States in 1923. they were originally numbered パシ913–パシ918, but after six Japanese-built copies of the Pashii class were delivered later in the same year, in 1924 the ALCo engines were renumbered パシ919–パシ924 in order to free 913–918 up for the new Pashii units. When Sentetsu introduced its new numbering system in 1938, these engines were redesignated パシニ (Pashini) class and numbered パシニ1 through パシニ6.

These engines represented a milestone in Korean railway history, having been the very last class of locomotives imported by Sentetsu from outside the Japanese Empire.

== Postwar: Korean State Railway 바시두 (Pasidu) class ==
After the partition of Korea, all six of the Pashini-class locomotives were in the North, and were taken over by the Korean State Railway (Kukch'ŏl) and were initially designated 바시두 (Pasidu) class. Little of their service lives in the North is known. It's uncertain whether they remained in service long enough to be renumbered with a four-digit serial number, and their subsequent fate is unknown; they were likely retired in the late 1960s or early 1970s.

After retirement, one of them, 바시두3, was fully restored to its original condition, including the original Sentetsu "パシニ3" number plates, and is now on display at the Wŏnsan Revolutionary Museum in Wŏnsan, which was opened in 1975 in Wŏnsan's original Sentetsu-built railway station building.

== Construction ==
Sentetsu running number						
1923–1924	1924–1938	1938–1945	Kukch'ŏl Number	Builder	Year	Notes
パシ913	パシ919	パシニ1	바시두1	ALCo	1923	Presumably scrapped.
パシ914	パシ920	パシニ2	바시두2	ALCo	1923	Presumably scrapped.
パシ915	パシ921	パシニ3	바시두3	ALCo	1923	Restored and displayed at Wŏnsan as パシニ3.
パシ916	パシ922	パシニ4	바시두4	ALCo	1923	Presumably scrapped.
パシ917	パシ923	パシニ5	바시두5	ALCo	1923	Presumably scrapped.
パシ918	パシ924	パシニ6	바시두6	ALCo	1923	Presumably scrapped.
Total						6
