= Chōsen Anthracite Company =

Japanese company in Korea (1927–1945)

Chōsen Anthracite Company Ltd.
- Native name: 조선무연탄주식회사 朝鮮無煙炭株式会社
- Romanized name: Korean: Joseon Muyeontan Jusikhoesa; Japanese: Chōsen Muentan Kabushiki Kaisha
- Type: Kabushiki kaisha
- Industry: Mining, Railway
- Founded: 1927
- Defunct: 1945
- Fate: Abolished
- Headquarters: Korea, Empire of Japan

Muncheon Port Line

Overview
- Native name: Korean: 문천항선 (Muncheonhang-seon); Japanese: 文川港線 (Genzankō-sen)
- Owner: Chosen Anthracite Company
- Locale: Gangwon
- Termini: Muncheon; Wonsanbukhang
- Stations: 2

Service
- Type: Heavy rail, Regional rail
- Operator: Chosen Anthracite Company Railway

History
- Opened: 17 December 1943

Technical
- Line length: 7.4 km (4.6 mi)
- Number of tracks: Single track
- Track gauge: 1,435 mm (4 ft 8 1/2 in) standard gauge

The Chōsen Anthracite Company, Ltd. (Japanese: 朝鮮無煙炭株式会社 Chōsen Muentan Kabushiki Kaisha; 조선무연탄주식회사; Joseon Muyeontan Jusikhoesa) was a kabushiki kaisha in colonial Korea that operated collieries around Korea. It was founded in 1927 by the Mitsubishi zaibatsu of Japan by integrating the anthracite mining operations around Heijō, eventually becoming the largest coal-producing company in Korea - 74.9% of the coal distributed in Korea was produced by the Chōsen Anthracite Company.

In 1935, majority control of the Chōsen Anthracite Company went to the Oriental Development Company (Japanese: Tōyō Takushoku Kabushiki Kaisha), which transformed the Chosen Anthracite Company into a multipurpose company which, in addition to the production and distribution of coal, built and operated ports and railways.

On 17 December 1943 the Chōsen Anthracite Company opened a railway line from Bunsen on the Chōsen Government Railway's Kankyō Line to a port it had constructed at Kogan-dō, Bunsen city, Gangwon Province. Named the Bunsen Port Line, it ran 7.4 km (4.6 mi) from Bunsen station to Genzan North Port station.

Following the partition of Korea and the establishment of North Korea, the company was abolished. The Muncheon Port Line, along with all other railway lines in the country, was nationalised on 10 August 1946, becoming part of the Korean State Railway.
