= Munchon station =

Railway station in North Korea

Munch'ŏn 문천

Korean name
- Hangul: 문천역
- Hanja: 文川驛
- Revised Romanization: Muncheon-yeok
- McCune–Reischauer: Munch'ŏn-yŏk

General information
- Location: Munch'ŏn-dong, Munch'ŏn-si, Kangwŏn; North Korea
- Coordinates: 39.2346°N 127.3553°E
- Owner: Korean State Railway

History
- Opened: 1 August 1915

Services
Preceding station	Korean State Railway	Following station
Ongp'yŏng towards Kowŏn	Kangwŏn Line	Segil towards P'yŏnggang
Location

Munch'ŏn station (Korean: 문천역) is a railway station in Munch'ŏn-dong, greater Munch'ŏn city, Kangwŏn province, North Korea, on the Kangwŏn Line of the Korean State Railway. Originally called Munp'yŏng station (Chosŏn'gŭl: 문평역; Hanja: 文坪驛), the station, along with the rest of the Okp'yŏng–Wŏnsan section of the former Hamgyŏng Line, was opened by the Japanese on 1 August 1915. It received its current name after the establishment of the DPRK.

This station serves the Munp'yŏng smelter and the May 18th Works factory.
