= Sentetsu Pashisa-class locomotive =

4-6-2 steam locomotive

Chosen Government Railway Pashisa class (パシサ) Korean National Railroad Pasi3 class (바시3) Korean State Railway Pasisŏ class (바시서)
Type and origin
- Power type: Steam
- Builder: Kawasaki
- Build date: 1923
- Total produced: 6
Specifications
- Configuration
  - Whyte: 4-6-2
- Gauge: 1,435 mm (4 ft 8 1/2 in)
- Driver dia.: 1,750 mm (69 in)
- Length: 22,060 mm (72 ft 5 in)
- Width: 3,054 mm (10 ft 0.2 in)
- Height: 4,228 mm (13 ft 10.5 in)
- Loco weight: 89.60 t (88.18 long tons)
- Tender weight: 57.50 t (56.59 long tons)
- Fuel capacity: 9.4 t (9.3 long tons)
- Water cap.: 22,700 L (6,000 US gal)
- Firebox
  - Grate area: 4.36 m^{2} (46.9 sq ft)
- Boiler
  - Small tubes: 127 x 51 mm (2.0 in)
  - Large tubes: 32 x 137 mm (5.4 in)
- Boiler pressure: 13.0 kgf/cm^{2} (185 psi)
- Heating surface
  - Firebox: 17.00 m^{2} (183.0 sq ft)
  - Tubes: 187.10 m^{2} (2,013.9 sq ft)
  - Total surface: 204.10 m^{2} (2,196.9 sq ft)
- Superheater
  - Heating area: 75.30 m^{2} (810.5 sq ft)
- Cylinders: 1
- Cylinder size: 610 mm × 660 mm (24 in × 26 in)
- Valve gear: Walschaerts
Performance figures
- Maximum speed: 95 km/h (59 mph)
- Tractive effort: 140.0 kN (31,500 lb_{f})
Career
- Operators: Chosen Government Railway; Korean National Railroad; Korean State Railway
- Class: Sentetsu: パシサ; KNR: 바시3; KSR: 바시서
- Number in class: Sentetsu: 6
- Numbers: Sentetsu: パシサ1–パシサ6
- Delivered: 1923

The Pashisa class (パシサ) locomotives were a group of steam tender locomotives of the Chosen Government Railway (Sentetsu) with 4-6-2 wheel arrangement. The "Pashi" name came from the American naming system for steam locomotives, under which locomotives with 4-6-2 wheel arrangement were called "Pacific".

In all, Sentetsu owned 144 locomotives of all Pashi classes, of which 141 survived the war; of these, 73 went to the Korean National Railroad in South Korea and 68 to the Korean State Railway in North Korea.

== Description ==
Along with the six Pashii copies built by Kisha Seizō, 1923 saw the delivery of another six similar locomotives from Kawasaki of Japan, the パシサ (Pashisa) class. Originally numbered パシ957–パシ962, they became パシサ1–パシサ6 in Sentetsu's general renumbering of 1938. The success of these engines and the Japanese-built Pashii copies proved that domestic (i.e. Japanese, Manchurian and Korean) industry was more than capable of building satisfactory locomotives, and signalled the end of the importation of locomotives from foreign sources.

== Postwar ==
The exact dispersal of the Pashisa-class locomotives between North and South after the partition of Korea is uncertain, but it was likely an even split.

=== Korean National Railroad 파시3 (Pasi3) class ===
The Korean National Railroad likely received three of the six Pashisa-class locomotives; the identies of two are known for certain. They were designated 파시3 (Pasi3) class, and were used by the KNR on passenger trains until the end of the 1960s.

=== Korean State Railway 바시서 (Pasisŏ) class ===
The Korean State Railway is believed to have received three of the six Pashisa-class locomotives. Little of their service lives is known, but they were initially designated 바시서 (Pasisŏ) class, and they were likely retired by the end of the 1960s.

== Construction ==
Sentetsu running number		Postwar				
1923–1938	1938–1945	Owner	Number	Builder	Year	Notes
パシ957	パシサ1	?	?	Kawasaki	1923	
パシ958	パシサ2	KNR	파시3-2	Kawasaki	1923	
パシ959	パシサ3	?	?	Kawasaki	1923	
パシ960	パシサ4	?	?	Kawasaki	1923	
パシ961	パシサ5	?	?	Kawasaki	1923	
パシ962	パシサ6	KNR	파시3-6	Kawasaki	1923	
Total						6
