= Ongpyong station =

Railway station in North Korea

Ongp'yŏng 옥평

Korean name
- Hangul: 옥평역
- Hanja: 玉坪驛
- Revised Romanization: Okpyeong-yeok
- McCune–Reischauer: Okp'yŏng-yŏk

General information
- Location: Ongp'yŏng-dong, Munch'ŏn-si, Kangwŏn; North Korea
- Coordinates: 39.2871°N 127.3053°E
- Owner: Korean State Railway

History
- Opened: 21 July 1916
- Former names: Munch'ŏn station 문천역 (文川駅)
- Original company: Chosen Government Railway

Services
Preceding station	Korean State Railway	Following station
Ryongdam towards Kowŏn	Kangwŏn Line	Munch'ŏn towards P'yŏnggang
Terminus	Munch'ŏn Port Line	Koam Terminus
Location

Ongp'yŏng station is a railway station in Ongp'yŏng-dong, greater Munch'ŏn city, Kangwŏn province, North Korea, on the Kangwŏn Line of the Korean State Railway; it is also the starting point of the Munch'ŏn Port Line to Koam.

== History ==
Originally called Munch'ŏn station (Chosŏn'gŭl: 문천역; Hanja: 文川駅), the station, along with the rest of the Ongp'yŏng–Kowŏn–Kŭmya section of the former Hamgyŏng Line, was opened by the Chosen Government Railway on 21 July 1916, while the Munch'ŏn Port Line was opened on 17 December 1943 by the Chosen Anthracite Company as a privately owned railway. This line, like all other railway lines in North Korea, was nationalised after the Second World War, becoming part of the Korean State Railway.; the station received its current name after that.
