= Muncheon Gong clan =

Korean clan from South Hamgyong Province

- Country: Korea
- Current region: Muncheon
- Founder: Gong Bo eon

Muncheon Gong clan (Korean: 문천 공씨; Hanja: 文川 公氏) was one of the Korean clans. Their Bon-gwan was in Munchon, South Hamgyong Province. According to the research in 2000, the number of Muncheon Gong clan was 686. Gong Yun bo, a descendant of Gong Ha su who was a pupil of Confucius, was one of the Jinshi (Hanja: 进士) in Tang dynasty. He was naturalized in Silla in 755 in order to avoid the conflicts named An Lushan Rebellion in Tang dynasty during Emperor Xuanzong of Tang’s reign. Muncheon Gong clan’s founder was Gong Bo eon. He was a descendant of Gong Yun bo and was banished to Muncheon in Joseon period during Sejong the Great’s reign.

== See also ==
- Korean clan names of foreign origin
- Gimpo Gong clan
