= Sentetsu Barui-class locomotive =

Class of 12 Korean 4-6-4T locomotives

Chosen Government Railway Barui class (バルイ) Korean National RR Baru1 class (바티1) Korean State Railway Baruha class (바루하)
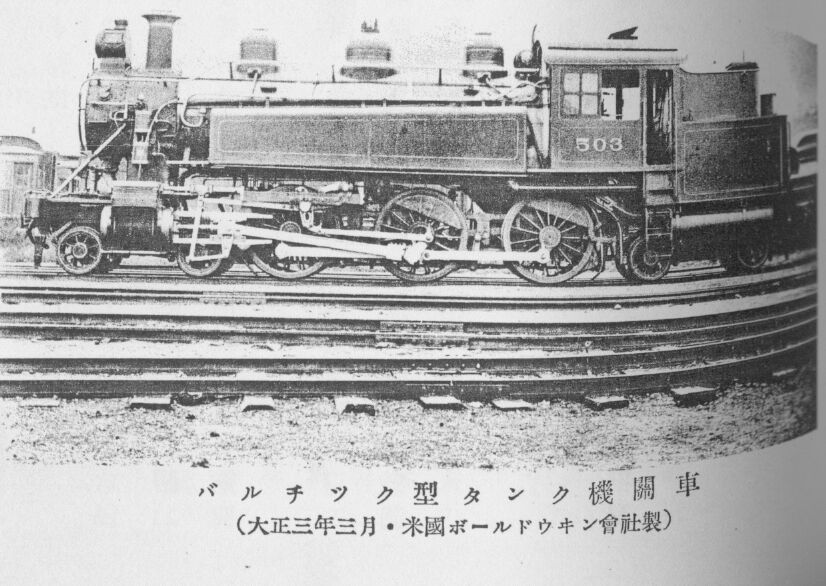
- Sentetsu steam locomotive バルイ503
Type and origin
- Power type: Steam
- Builder: Baldwin
- Build date: 1913−1914
- Total produced: 12
Specifications
- Configuration
  - Whyte: 4-6-4T
- Gauge: 1,435 mm (4 ft 8 1/2 in)
- Driver dia.: 1,520 mm (60 in)
- Length: 13,552 mm (533.5 in)
- Width: 3,048 mm (120.0 in)
- Height: 4,456 mm (175.4 in)
- Adhesive weight: 52.42 t (51.59 long tons)
- Loco weight: 150.0 t (147.6 long tons)
- Fuel capacity: 1.0 t (0.98 long tons; 1.1 short tons)
- Water cap.: 11.3 m^{3} (3,000 US gal)
- Firebox
  - Grate area: 2.78 m^{2} (29.9 sq ft)
- Boiler
  - Small tubes: 196 x 51 mm (2.0 in)
- Boiler pressure: 12.0 kgf/cm^{2} (171 psi)
- Heating surface
  - Firebox: 14.7 m^{2} (158 sq ft)
  - Tubes: 116.1 m^{2} (1,250 sq ft)
  - Total surface: 130.8 m^{2} (1,408 sq ft)
- Cylinder size: 450 mm × 660 mm (18 in × 26 in)
- Valve gear: Walschaerts
Performance figures
- Maximum speed: 75 km/h (47 mph)
- Tractive effort: 95.0 kN (21,400 lb_{f})
Career
- Operators: Chosen Government Railway; Korean National Railroad; Korean State Railway
- Class: Sentetsu: バルイ; KNR: 바루1; KSR: 바루하
- Number in class: Sentetsu: 12; KNR: 3 KSR: 9
- Numbers: バルイ1–バルイ12
- Delivered: 1913−1914

The Barui class (バルイ) was a class of steam tank locomotives of the Chosen Government Railway (Sentetsu) with 4-6-4 wheel arrangement. The "Baru" name came from the American naming system for steam locomotives, under which locomotives with 4-6-4 wheel arrangement were called "Baltic".

To meet the needs of ever-increasing freight traffic, four were built by the Baldwin Locomotive Works of the United States for Sentetsu in 1913, who used them primarily on the Gyeongwon Line. Another two were built in 1914, and subsequently a further six were added, and a total of twelve were in service at the time of Japan's defeat in the Pacific War in 1945.

Initially numbered バルイ501 through バルイ512, they received the バルイ1 through バルイ12 numbers in Sentetsu's general renumbering of 1938.

After the partition of Korea, three went to the Korean National Railroad in South Korea, where they were called 발틱1 (or 발틱) class (Baltik), and nine to the Korean State Railway in North Korea, where they were designated 바루하 class (Paruha).
