= Sentetsu Goroi-class locomotive =

Class of 3 Korean 2-4-2T locomotives

Chosen Government Railway Goroi class (ゴロイ) Korean State Railway Koroha class (고로하)
Type and origin
- Power type: Steam
- Builder: Kisha Seizō
- Build date: 1924
- Total produced: 3
Specifications
- Configuration
  - Whyte: 2-4-2T
- Gauge: 1,435 mm (4 ft 8 1/2 in)
- Driver dia.: 1,370 mm (54 in)
- Length: 9,292 mm (365.8 in)
- Height: 4,250 mm (167 in)
- Adhesive weight: 28.00 t (27.56 long tons)
- Loco weight: 43.85 t (43.16 long tons)
- Fuel type: Coal
- Fuel capacity: 1.27 t (1.25 long tons)
- Water cap.: 4.50 m^{3} (159 cu ft)
- Firebox
  - Grate area: 1.12 m^{2} (12.1 sq ft)
- Boiler
  - Small tubes: 68 x 51 mm (2.0 in)
  - Large tubes: 15 x 137 mm (5.4 in)
- Boiler pressure: 13.0 kgf/cm^{2} (185 psi)
- Heating surface
  - Firebox: 5.6 m^{2} (60 sq ft)
  - Tubes: 47.4 m^{2} (510 sq ft)
  - Total surface: 69.2 m^{2} (745 sq ft)
- Superheater
  - Heating area: 16.2 m^{2} (174 sq ft)
- Cylinder size: 300 mm × 457 mm (11.8 in × 18.0 in)
- Valve gear: Walschaerts
Performance figures
- Maximum speed: 75 km/h (47 mph)
- Tractive effort: 32.0 kN (7,200 lb_{f})
Career
- Operators: Chosen Government Railway; Korean State Railway
- Class: Sentetsu: ゴロイ; KSR: 고로하
- Number in class: 3
- Numbers: Sentetsu: ゴロイ1 – ゴロイ3 (1938-1945); KSR: 고로하1 – 고로하3

The Goroi class (ゴロイ) was a class of steam tank locomotives of the Chosen Government Railway (Sentetsu) with 2-4-2 wheel arrangement. The "Goro" name came from the American naming system for steam locomotives, under which locomotives with 2-4-2 wheel arrangement were called "Columbia".

== Description ==
Three Goro-class locomotives were built in 1923 by Kisha Seizō of Japan for Sentetsu, delivered in 1924. Initially numbered 61-63, they received the ゴロイ1 through ゴロイ3 numbers in Sentetsu's general renumbering of 1938.

After the partition of Korea, all three Goroi-class locomotives went to the Korean State Railway in North Korea, where they were designated 고로하 (Koroha) class and numbered 고로하1 through 고로하3.

== Construction ==
Sentetsu running number		Postwar				
Original	1938–1945	Owner	Number	Builder	Year	Works number
ゴロ61	ゴロイ1	KSR	고로하1	Kisha Seizō	1923	754
ゴロ62	ゴロイ2	KSR	고로하2	Kisha Seizō	1923	755
ゴロ63	ゴロイ3	KSR	고로하3	Kisha Seizō	1923	756
Total						3
