= Sentetsu Jiha class railcars =

Diesel-powered railcar

Sentetsu Jiha class
- Manufacturer: Gyeongseong Works
- Constructed: 1933
- Number built: 2
- Fleet numbers: 1–2
- Capacity: 100 passengers
- Operators: Chosen Government Railway; Korean National Railroad

Specifications
- Car length: 13,537 mm (44 ft 5.0 in)
- Width: 3,160 mm (10 ft 4 in)
- Height: 3,911 mm (12 ft 10.0 in)
- Weight: 26.7 t (26.3 long tons; 29.4 short tons)
- Prime mover(s): MWM SS17S
- Engine type: Diesel engine
- Power output: 110 hp (82 kW)@1300 rpm
- Braking system(s): Air brakes, hand brakes
- Track gauge: 1,435 mm (4 ft 8 1/2 in)

The Jiha (Japanese ジハ, Korean 디하) class railcars were a pair of Diesel-powered railcars of the Chosen Government Railway (Sentetsu). After Liberation, they all remained in the South, where they were operated by the Korean National Railroad; none were preserved.

== Development ==
Following the experiences with the Keha class petrol railcars, in 1931 Sentetsu decided, in the interests of reducing fuel costs, to design and introduce a railcar powered by a diesel engine. Two Jiha1 (ジハ1) diesel railcars were therefore built in 1933 at the Gyeongseong Works.

== Structure and mechanics ==
The structure and interior of the diesel railcars was similar to the gasoline-powered Keha railcars, but they were more streamlined at both ends, and were powered by a German Motoren Werke Mannheim SS17S 110 hp (82 kW) diesel engine with cylinders of 127 mm (5.0 in) bore; the pistons were made of light alloy, and the cylinder head was cast iron. The fuel injector and the injection timing mechanism were almost identical to those used today. The engines were imported from Germany and were installed at Gyeongseong.

== Reception ==
The diesel railcars, producing much less smoke than the gasoline-powered ones, were well received by the public and became quite popular. However, increasing oil shortages during the Pacific War led to their use being curtailed. Therefore, the engines were modified to use other fuels such as alcohol and benzene; experiments were conducted with wood gas, as well. However, these proved unsatisfactory, and the experiments ceased in 1944.

== Final fate ==
Both railcars survived the Pacific War, remaining in the South after the partition of Korea, where they were operated by the Korean National Railroad until the early 1960s, when they were replaced by the DC-class diesel-hydraulic railcars built by Niigata Sharyō, Kinki Sharyō and Kawasaki.
