= Munchonhang Line =

Railway line in North Korea

Munch'ŏn Port Line

Overview
- Other name: Koam Line 고암선 (庫岩線)
- Native name: 문천항선 (文川港線)
- Status: Operational
- Owner: Chosen Anthracite Co. Railway (1943–1945); Korean State Railway (since 1945)
- Locale: Kangwŏn
- Termini: Ongpy'ŏng; Tapch'on
- Stations: 3

Service
- Type: Heavy rail, Freight rail Regional rail

History
- Opened: 17 December 1943 (Ongp'yŏng–Koam) ? (Koam–Sinhŭngri); 25 May 2018 (Sinhŭngri–Tapch'ŏn)

Technical
- Line length: 14.8 km (9.2 mi)
- Number of tracks: Single track
- Track gauge: 1,435 mm (4 ft 8 1/2 in) standard gauge

- Munchonhang Line
- Hangul: 문천항선
- Hanja: 文川港線
- RR: Muncheonhangseon
- MR: Munch'ŏnhangsŏn

The Munch'ŏnhang Line, or Munch'ŏn Port Line, also known as the Koam Line, is a non-electrified railway line of the Korean State Railway in Kangwŏn Province, North Korea, connecting Ongp'yŏng on the Kangwŏn Line with Tapchon.

== History ==
The line was originally opened by the Chosen Anthracite Company (Japanese: 朝鮮無煙炭株式会社, Chōsen Muentan Kabushiki Kaisha, Korean: 조선 무연탄 주식회사, Chosŏn Muyŏnt'an Chusikhoesa) on 17 December 1943 as a privately owned railway from Munch'ŏn Station on the Hamgyŏng Line (now called Ok'pyŏng Station) to Wŏnsanbukhang Station (now called Koam Station). Later, the line was extended some time after the Korean War from Koam to Sinhŭng-ri.

An extension from Sinhŭng-ri to a newly developed fishing community at T'apchol-li on the Sŏngjŏn Peninsula, via a causeway and the 600 m (2,000 ft) Sŏkchon Bay Bridge (석전만다리), was opened on 25 May 2018; the opening ceremony included an inspection of the line by Kim Jong-un.

== Services ==
This line serves the May 27 Fishery Station at Koam, the October 3 Factory at Sinhŭng-ri, and the fishing community at Tapch'ŏl-li.

== Route ==
A yellow background in the "Distance" box indicates that section of the line is not electrified.

Distance (km)		Station Name		Former Name		
Total	S2S	Transcribed	Chosŏn'gŭl (Hanja)	Transcribed	Chosŏn'gŭl (Hanja)	Connections
0.0	0.0	Ongp'yŏng	옥평 (玉坪)	Munch'ŏn	문천 (文川)	Kangwŏn Line
7.4	7.4	Koam	고암 (庫巖)	Wŏnsanbukhang (Wŏnsan North Port)	원산북항 (元山北港)	
~~10.3~~	~~2.9~~	Sinhŭngri	신흥리 (新興里)			Closed
11.3	1.0	October 3 Factory	10.3 공장 (10.3工場)			
14.8	3.5	Tapch'on	답촌 (畓村)			

== External Media ==
Video report on the opening ceremony and inaugural train across the Sŏkchon Bay Bridge (in Korean)
