= Koam station =

Railway station in North Korea

Koam 고암

Korean name
- Hangul: 고암역
- Hanja: 庫岩驛
- Revised Romanization: Goam-yeok
- McCune–Reischauer: Koam-yŏk

General information
- Location: Koam-dong, Munch'ŏn-si, Kangwŏn; North Korea
- Coordinates: 39.2917°N 127.3788°E
- Owner: Korean State Railway

History
- Opened: 17 December 1943
- Former names: Wŏnsanbukhang station 원산북항역 元山北港驛
- Original company: Chosen Anthracite Co.

Services
Preceding station	Korean State Railway	Following station
Ongp'yŏng Terminus	Munch'ŏn Port Line	Terminus
Location

Koam station is a railway station in Koam-dong, greater Munch'ŏn city, Kangwŏn province, North Korea, on the Munch'ŏn Port Line of the Korean State Railway; the branchline connects to the Kangwŏn Line at Okp'yŏng.

== History ==
Originally called Wŏnsanbukhang station (Chosŏn'gŭl: 원산북항역; Hanja: 元山北港驛, "Wonsan north port station"), it was opened, along with the rest of the branch from Okp'yŏng (at the time called Munch'ŏn station), on 17 December 1943 by the Chosen Anthracite Company as a privately owned railway. This line, like all other railway lines in North Korea, was nationalised after the Second World War, becoming part of the Korean State Railway, subsequently receiving its current name.
