= Sentetsu Nakeha class railcars =

Railway rolling stock operated in Korea

Sentetsu Nakeha class
- Manufacturer: Nakeha1: Nippon Sharyō; Nakeha2: Gyeongseong Works
- Constructed: Nakeha1: 1928–29; Nakeha2: 1930–31
- Number built: Nakeha1: 7 Nakeha2: 6
- Capacity: Nakeha1: 30 passengers Nakeha2 2: 45 passengers, 0.5 t (0.49 long tons; 0.55 short tons) baggage
- Operators: Chosen Government Railway; Korean National Railroad

Specifications
- Car length: Nakeha2: 11,322 mm (37 ft 1.7 in)
- Width: Nakeha2: 2,135 mm (7 ft 0.1 in)
- Height: Nakeha2: 3,200 mm (10 ft 6 in)
- Weight: Nakeha2: 12.5 t (12.3 long tons; 13.8 short tons)
- Prime mover(s): Nakeha1: Ford; Nakeha2: Waukesha 6-KU
- Engine type: Petrol engine
- Cylinder count: Nakeha2: 6
- Power output: Nakeha1: 33 hp (25 kW); Nakeha2: 62 hp (46 kW)
- Power supply: Nakeha1: 1x 6V generator Nageha2: 1x 15V generator (1st 4); Nakeha2: 1x 24V 900W axle-mounted (last 2)
- AAR wheel arrangement: Nakeha1: 1A-2; Nakeha2: 1A-2
- Track gauge: 762 mm (2 ft 6 in)

The Nakeha (Japanese ナケハ, Korean 혀게하) class railcars were a group of 3rd class narrow-gauge petrol-powered railcars of the Chosen Government Railway (Sentetsu). There were two classes of such railcars, one built in Japan and one built in Korea. After Liberation, they all remained in the South, where they were operated by the Korean National Railroad; none were preserved.

== Nakeha1 class (ナケハ1) ==
By 1925 local and urban railway passenger transport was coming under threat from the increasing usage of the automobile. Seeing their successful use abroad, Sentetsu decided to put railcars with internal combustion engines into service. In Korea, the first 3rd class petrol-powered railcars entered service in 1928 on the narrow-gauge Donghae Jungbu Line (Daegu-Gyeongju, now part of the Daegu and Jungang lines). These were the Nageha1 class railcars.

These small, 30-passenger railcars, the Nakeha1 class, were made in Japan by Nippon Sharyō and were powered by a 33 hp (25 kW) Ford engine. A total of seven were built in 1928 and 1929, and they quickly proved well suited to frequent suburban service due to their low operational costs when compared with locomotive-hauled passenger trains.

== Nakeha2 class (ナケハ2) ==
Drawing on their experiences with the Nakeha1 class and with the British-made Shiki2 class steam railcars, Sentetsu designed the Nakeha2 class narrow-gauge gasoline railcars in-house. Powered by a Waukesha Motor Company 6-KU 62 hp (46 kW) 6-cylinder petrol engine imported from the United States, they carried 45 passengers in 3rd class accommodations. Originally numbered 11 through 16, they were renumbered ナケハ2-1 through ナケハ2-6 in Sentetsu's general renumbering of 1938. A total of six were built by the Gyeongseong Works, the first four being delivered to Sentetsu in 1930, followed by two more in 1931.

== Korean National Railroad ==
After the end of the Pacific War and the subsequent partition of Korea, all thirteen railcars of both Nakeha classes remained in the South Korea, where they were operated by the Korean National Railroad. They were retired in 1965, being replaced by the Narrow-gauge DC-class diesel-hydraulic railcars.
