= Temporary Military Railway =

1904–1906 organization in colonial Korea

Temporary Military Railway Office
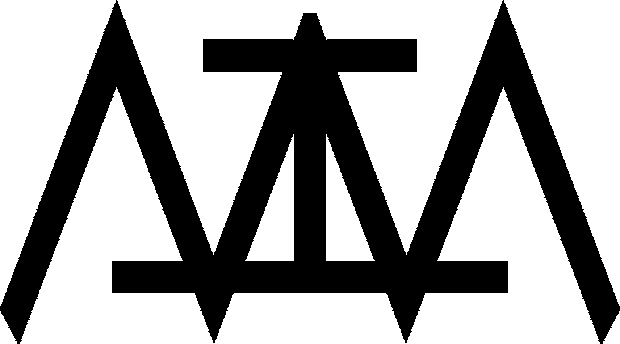
- Native name: 臨時軍用鐵道監部 임시 군용 철도 감부
- Romanized name: Rinji Gun'yō Tetsudō Kanbu; Imsi Gunyong Cheoldo Ganbu
- Industry: Land transport
- Predecessor: Western Railway
- Founded: 1904
- Defunct: 1 September 1906
- Fate: Nationalised
- Successor: National Railway
- Headquarters: Gyeongseong, Korean Empire
- Area served: Korea
- Services: Passenger & freight railways

The Temporary Military Railway Office (Japanese: 臨時軍用鐵道監部, Rinji Gun'yō Tetsudō Kanbu; Korean: 임시 군용 철도 감부, Imsi Gunyong Cheoldo Ganbu), was a pseudo-corporate entity established by the Imperial Japanese Army to build and operate the Gyeongui Line railway from Gyeongseong (today: Seoul) to Sinuiju.

It opened the second railway line on the Korean Peninsula in April 1906, and was nationalised to create the National Railway in September of the same year.

== History ==
Construction of a railway line running north from Hanseong had been envisioned since the end of the 19th century, but the lack of funding led to the failure of several attempts. Over the last five years of the century several abortive attempts were made to that end. In 1896 the French Fives Lille obtained the rights to build a railway line in Korea, but after failing to secure the necessary funding, the rights were transferred to the "Korean Railway Company" (대한철도회사, Daehan Cheoldohoesa) in 1899. However, this attempt likewise went nowhere. Finally, in 1900, the government-owned "Western Railway" (서부철도회사, Seobu Cheoldohoesa) began surveying a route for a railway from Gyeongseong to Gaeseong. Construction of what was to become the first section of the Gyeongui Line began in 1902.

Imperial Japan, which had gained the concession to build the Gyeongbu Line from Seoul to Busan, recognising that a railway running through all of Korea from north to south would serve as a means to strengthen its influence over Korea, sought to gain control of the Gyeongui Line project as well. When the Russo-Japanese War broke out in 1904, Japan ignored Korea's declaration of neutrality, transporting troops to Incheon and forcing the Korean government to sign an agreement that gave Japan's military control of railway projects if deemed necessary for military operations. The Imperial Japanese Army then established the Temporary Military Railway Office, and took over control of the Western Railway, intending to use the line to assist with military operations against Russia in Manchuria. The Yongsan–Gaeseong section was completed in March 1904, followed by the completion of the Pyeongyang–Sinuiju (today's Kangan Station) section on 28 April 1905, and freight operations between Yongsan and Sinuiju began on 5 November of that year. Although the war had ended on 5 September of that year, the Japanese military retained control of the Temporary Military Railway, still intent on using it to ensure its dominance in Korea. In the following year, bridges were completed over the Cheongcheon and Daedong rivers, allowing for the operation of through trains between Yongsan and Sinŭiju. The standard-gauge Gyeongui Line, 496.7 km (308.6 mi) in length, was officially opened on 3 April 1906.

Twelve days after freight operations began on the Gyeongui Line, the Second Japan–Korea Convention was signed, making the Empire of Korea a protectorate of the Empire of Japan, with the Japanese Resident-General representing Japan in Korea. The Administration of the Resident-General established its Railway Office on 1 July 1906, at the same time nationalising the privately owned (by Japanese interests) Gyeongbu Railway, which by then was the only other railway operator in Korea besides the Temporary Military Railway. On 1 September of that year, the Railway Office took over control of the Gyeongui Line from the military and merged it with the Gyeongbu Railway to create the National Railway Administration.

== Rolling stock ==
The Temporary Military Railway bought six American-built 2-8-0 steam locomotives second-hand in 1904. These were used first to assist with the construction of the line, and later on regular freight trains; after nationalisation, these eventually became the Sorii-class. Then, 52 2-6-2 tank locomotives were ordered, identical to the 18 ordered Gyeongbu Railway in 1901; these were delivered as knock-down kits and assembled at Incheon. After nationalisation, these eventually became the Purei-class.

Numbers	Wheel arrangement	Builder	Built	Total in class	Image	Notes
101–106	2-8-0	Baldwin	1894	6		Bought second-hand in 1904. Became Sentetsu Sorii-class.
1–52	2-6-2T	Baldwin	1906	52		Became Sentetsu Purei-class.
