= Sentetsu Satai-class locomotive =

2-10-2T steam locomotive

Chosen Government Railway Satai class (サタイ) Korean National RR Sata class (사타) Korean State Railway Sadaha class (사다하)
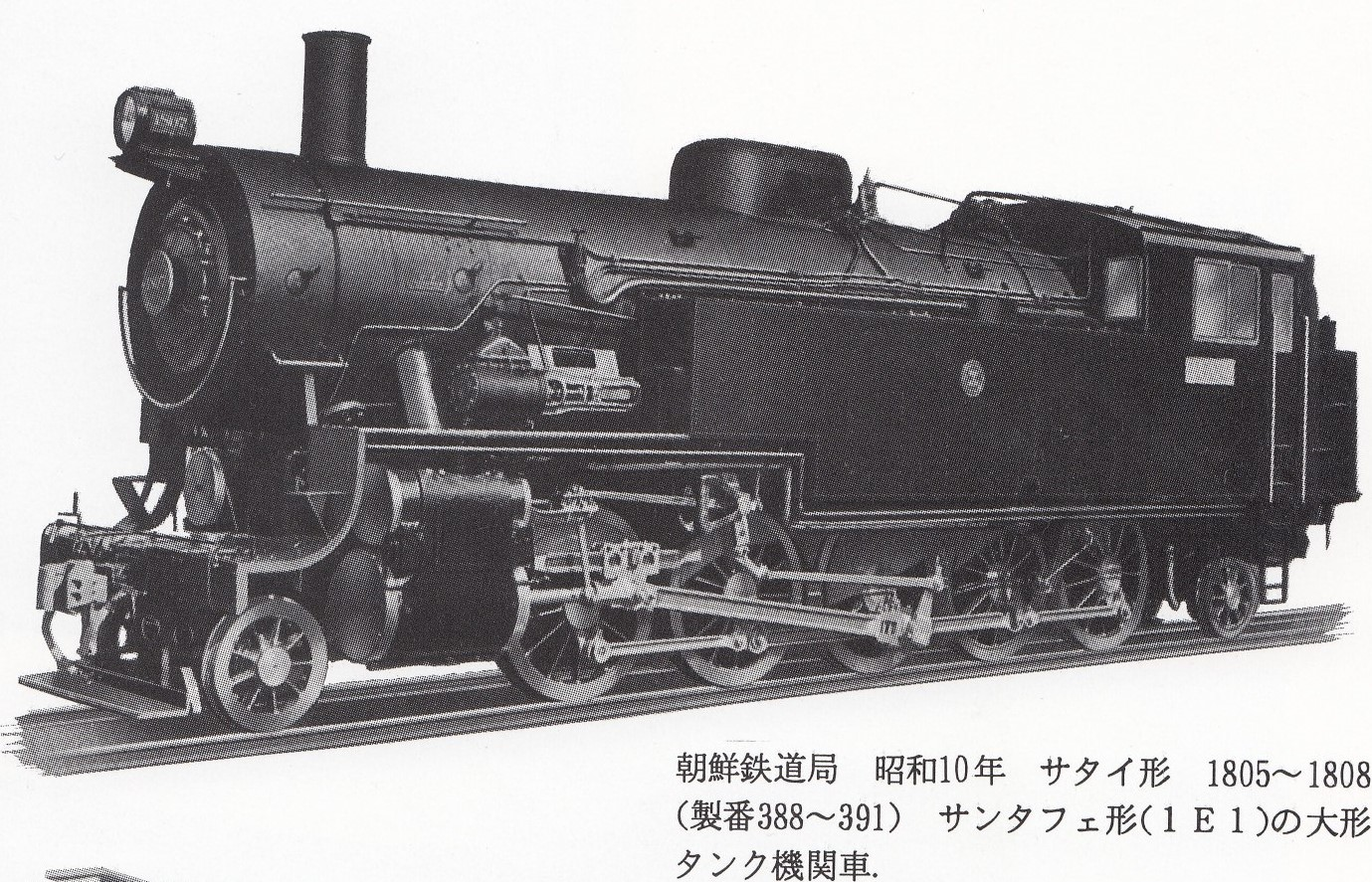
- Nippon Sharyo's builder's photo
Type and origin
- Power type: Steam
- Builder: Gyeongseong Works, Hitachi
- Build date: 1934–1939
- Total produced: 24
Specifications
- Configuration
  - Whyte: 2-10-2T
- Gauge: 1,435 mm (4 ft 8 1/2 in)
- Driver dia.: 1,450 mm (57 in)
- Length: 13,878 mm (546.4 in)
- Width: 3,260 mm (128 in)
- Height: 4,750 mm (187 in)
- Adhesive weight: 82.00 t (80.70 long tons; 90.39 short tons)
- Loco weight: 110.00 t (108.26 long tons; 121.25 short tons)
- Fuel type: Coal
- Fuel capacity: 4.00 t (3.94 long tons; 4.41 short tons)
- Water cap.: 8.50 m^{3} (300 cu ft)
- Firebox
  - Grate area: 4.75 m^{2} (51.1 sq ft)
- Boiler
  - Small tubes: 170 x 51 mm (2.0 in)
  - Large tubes: 32 x 137 mm (5.4 in)
- Boiler pressure: 14.0 kgf/cm^{2} (199 psi)
- Heating surface
  - Firebox: 15.0 m^{2} (161 sq ft)
  - Tubes: 204.8 m^{2} (2,204 sq ft)
  - Total surface: 290.1 m^{2} (3,123 sq ft)
- Superheater
  - Heating area: 70.3 m^{2} (757 sq ft)
- Cylinder size: 560 mm × 710 mm (22 in × 28 in)
- Valve gear: Walschaerts
Performance figures
- Maximum speed: 75 km/h (47 mph)
- Tractive effort: 179.0 kN (40,200 lb_{f})
Career
- Operators: Chosen Government Railway; Korean State Railway; Korean National Railroad
- Class: Sentetsu: サタイ; KNR: 사타; KSR: 사다하
- Number in class: Sentetsu: 24; KNR: 8 KSR: 16
- Numbers: サタイ1 - サタイ24 (1938-1945)
- Delivered: 1934–1939

The Satai class (サタイ) class locomotives were a class of large steam tank locomotives of the Chosen Government Railway (Sentetsu) with 2-10-2T wheel arrangement. The "Sata" name came from the American naming system for steam locomotives, under which locomotives with 2-10-2 wheel arrangement were called "Santa Fe".

== Description ==
The Satai class were large tank locomotives with high tractive effort, designed specifically for use on mountainous lines. Designed locally, a total of 24 were delivered to Sentetsu, the first four being built in 1934 at the Gyeongseong Works, and the last five in 1939 by Hitachi. Originally numbered 1801 through 1819, they received the サタイ1 through サタイ19 numbers in Sentetsu's general renumbering of 1938, while サタイ20–サタイ24 were built in 1939, after the new numbering system was introduced.

== Postwar ==
In the division of railway assets between North and South, sixteen of the Satai class locomotives went to the Korean State Railway in the North, designated 사다하 (Sadaha) class, and eight to the Korean National Railroad in the South, as 사타 (Sata) class.

== Construction ==
Original number	1938 number	Build year	Builder	Assembly location	Postwar owner	Postwar number	Notes
1801	サタイ1	1934	Gyeongseong	Gyeongseong	?		
1802	サタイ2	1934	Gyeongseong	Gyeongseong	KNR	사타2	Retired by 1953 and stored at Susaek Station near Seoul.
1803	サタイ3	1934	Gyeongseong	Gyeongseong	KNR	사타3	Retired by 1953 and stored at Susaek Station near Seoul.
1804	サタイ4	1934	Gyeongseong	Gyeongseong	?		
1805	サタイ5	1935	Nippon Sharyo (日本車輌)	Gyeongseong	?		
1806	サタイ6	1935	Nippon Sharyo (日本車輌)	Gyeongseong	?		
1807	サタイ7	1935	Nippon Sharyo (日本車輌)	Gyeongseong	?		
1808	サタイ8	1935	Nippon Sharyo (日本車輌)	Gyeongseong	?		
1809	サタイ9	1936	Gyeongseong	Gyeongseong	?		
1810	サタイ10	1936	Gyeongseong	Gyeongseong	?		
1811	サタイ11	1937	Nippon Sharyo (日本車輌)	Sentetsu Busan shops	?		
1812	サタイ12	1937	Nippon Sharyo (日本車輌)	Sentetsu Busan shops	?		
1813	サタイ13	1937	Nippon Sharyo (日本車輌)	Sentetsu Busan shops	?		
1814	サタイ14	1937	Nippon Sharyo (日本車輌)	Sentetsu Busan shops	?		
1815	サタイ15	1937	Nippon Sharyo (日本車輌)	Sentetsu Busan shops	?		
1816	サタイ16	1937	Nippon Sharyo (日本車輌)	Sentetsu Busan shops	?		
1817	サタイ17	1937	Nippon Sharyo (日本車輌)	Sentetsu Busan shops	?		
1818	サタイ18	1937	Nippon Sharyo (日本車輌)	Sentetsu Busan shops	?		
1819	サタイ19	1937	Nippon Sharyo (日本車輌)	Sentetsu Busan shops	?		
	サタイ20	1939	Nippon Sharyo (日本車輌)	Sentetsu Busan shops	?		
	サタイ21	1939	Nippon Sharyo (日本車輌)	Sentetsu Busan shops	KNR	사타21	Retired by 1953 and stored at Susaek Station near Seoul.
	サタイ22	1939	Nippon Sharyo (日本車輌)	Sentetsu Busan shops	?		
	サタイ23	1939	Nippon Sharyo (日本車輌)	Sentetsu Busan shops	KNR	사타23	Retired by 1953 and stored at Susaek Station near Seoul.
	サタイ24	1939	Nippon Sharyo (日本車輌)	Sentetsu Busan shops	?		
Total						24	
