= Gimpo Gong clan =

Korean clan from Gyeonggi Province

- Country: Korea
- Current region: Gimpo
- Founder: Gong Yun bo

Gimpo Gong clan (Korean: 김포 공씨; Hanja: 金浦 公氏) was one of the Korean clans. Their Bon-gwan was in Gimpo, Gyeonggi Province. According to the research in 2000, the number of Gimpo Gong clan was 2401. Their founder was Gong Yun bo. He was a subordinate of Confucius, and he was a descendant of Lu's royal family who was a descendant of Gong Ha su (Hanja: 公夏守). Gong Yun bo was one of the Eight Scholars (Hanja: 八學士) in Tang dynasty, but he became Gimpo Gong clan's founder after he was naturalized in Silla in 755 in order to avoid the conflicts named An Lushan Rebellion in Tang dynasty during Emperor Xuanzong of Tang's reign.

== See also ==
- Korean clan names of foreign origin
- Muncheon Gong clan
