= Sentetsu 4-Wheel class locomotives =

0-4-0 steam locomotive

Sentetsu Yonrin class
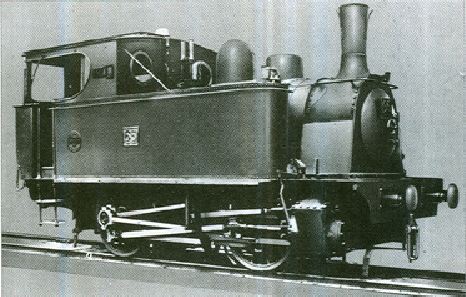
- A Hohenzollern-built 0-4-0T like those used by Sentetsu.
Type and origin
- Power type: Steam
- Builder: Hohenzollern
- Build date: 1899
Specifications
- Configuration
  - Whyte: 0-4-0T
- Gauge: 1,435 mm (4 ft 8 1/2 in)
- Driver dia.: 1,250 mm (49 in)
- Length: 6,927 mm (272.7 in)
- Width: 2,264 mm (89.1 in)
- Height: 3,314 mm (130.5 in)
- Loco weight: 24.0 t (23.6 long tons; 26.5 short tons)
- Fuel type: Coal
- Cylinder size: 300 mm × 500 mm (12 in × 20 in)
Performance figures
- Maximum speed: 75 km/h (47 mph)
Career
- Operators: Gyeongbu Railway; Chosen Government Railway
- Number in class: 2
- Delivered: April 1906

The 4-Wheel (Korean 사륜, Japanese 4輪) class locomotives were a class of steam tank locomotives with 0-4-0 wheel arrangement introduced by the Gyeongbu Railway Company in April 1906 for use on the Gyeongui Line.

The Hohenzollern Locomotive Works of Germany in 1899 built a number of 0-4-0 tank locomotives for the Japanese military in 1899. The Gyeongbu Railway Company obtained two of these in April 1906 for use on the Gyeongui Line opened that year. The Chosen Government Railway (Sentetsu) was founded on 1 July 1906 with the acquisition of the Gyeongbu Railway, and used the two locomotives on the Gyeongui Line for shunting and short-haul trains.

They were likely retired prior to 1938, as they were not listed in Sentetsu's general renumbering of that year.
