= Sentetsu Mateni-class locomotive =

Second class of Korean 4-8-2 locomotives

Chosen Government Railway Mateni class (マテニ) Korean State Railway Madŏdu class (마더두) Korean National Railroad Mateo2 class (마터2)
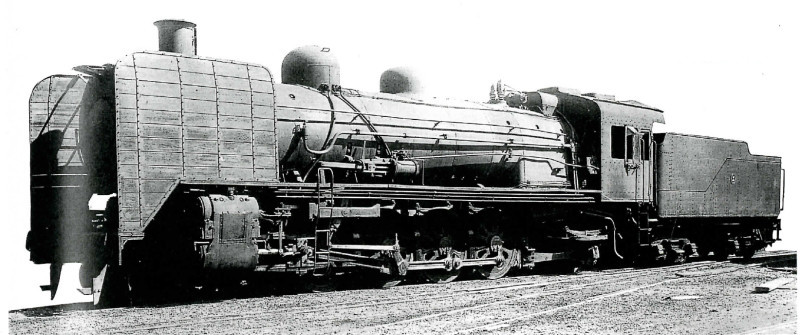
Type and origin
- Power type: Steam
- Builder: Kawasaki
- Build date: 1943−1945
- Total produced: 34
Specifications
- Configuration
  - Whyte: 4-8-2
- Gauge: 1,435 mm (4 ft 8 1/2 in)
- Driver dia.: 1,520 mm (59.84 in)
- Length: 23,266 mm (76 ft 4.0 in)
- Height: 4,600 mm (15 ft 1 in)
- Loco weight: 112.82 t (111.04 long tons)
- Tender weight: 65.80 t (64.76 long tons)
- Fuel capacity: 12.00 t (11.81 long tons)
- Water cap.: 28.0 m^{3} (7,400 US gal)
- Tender cap.: 9.60 t (9.4 long tons) (coal), 24 m^{3} (6,300 US gal) (water)
- Firebox
  - Grate area: 5.24 m^{2} (56.4 sq ft)
- Boiler
  - Small tubes: 63 x 51 mm (2.0 in)
  - Large tubes: 104 x 90 mm (3.5 in)
- Boiler pressure: 14.0 kgf/cm^{2} (199 psi)
- Heating surface
  - Firebox: 24.27 m^{2} (261.2 sq ft)
  - Tubes: 217.00 m^{2} (2,335.8 sq ft)
  - Total surface: 241.27 m^{2} (2,597.0 sq ft)
- Superheater
  - Heating area: 96.50 m^{2} (1,038.7 sq ft)
- Cylinders: 2
- Cylinder size: 600 mm × 710 mm (23.622 in × 27.953 in)
- Valve gear: Walschaerts
Performance figures
- Maximum speed: 90 km/h (56 mph)
- Tractive effort: 220.2 kN (49,500 lb_{f})
Career
- Operators: Chosen Government Railway; Korean State Railway; Korean National Railroad
- Class: Sentetsu: マテニ; KSR: 마더두; KNR: 마터2
- Number in class: Sentetsu: 34
- Numbers: Sentetsu: マテニ1–マテニ34
- Delivered: 1943–1945

The Mateni class (マテニ) locomotives were a class of steam tender locomotives of the Chosen Government Railway (Sentetsu) with 4-8-2 wheel arrangement. The "Mate" name came from the American naming system for steam locomotives, under which locomotives with 4-8-2 wheel arrangement were called "Mountain".

== Description ==
Designed by Sentetsu, the Mateni class was designed for long-distance freight and passenger trains on steep lines; shipments increased with the higher speeds offered by these locomotives. A total of 33 were built from 1943 through 1945, all by Kawasaki. The maximum axle load was 22 tons, in comparison to the 18 tons of Sentetsu's standard mainline freight locomotives, the Mikasa class, and the tractive effort of the Mateni was 220.2 kN (49,500 lb_{f}), as compared to the 179.0 kN (40,200 lb_{f}) of the Mikasa class. In addition, the locomotives were equipped with automatic stokers and economisers to improve boiler efficiency. In addition to being used for heavy freight trains, they were also used on passenger trains, and was the last type of locomotive designed by Sentetsu.

Year	Builder	Total	Numbers
1943	Kawasaki	14	マテニ1–マテニ14
1944	Kawasaki	12	マテニ15–マテニ26
1945	Kawasaki	7	マテニ27–マテニ33
1946	Kawasaki	1	マテニ34
Total		34	

== Postwar ==
After the Liberation and subsequent partition of Korea, both the Korean National Railroad (KNR) in the South and the Korean State Railway (Kukch'ŏl) in the North operated 4-8-2s inherited from Sentetsu. Of the 83 locomotives that were built of both the Mateni and Matei classes, only 77 remained in 1946; of these, 33 went to the Korean National Railroad in the South, and 44 to the Korean State Railway in the North, though none of the ones operated by the KNR are known for certain to have been of the Mateni class. The six locomotives of both classes that remain unaccounted for were likely either destroyed during the Pacific War or were possibly taken by Soviet Army, which during its occupation of North Korea took a large number of locomotives back to the USSR.

The bulk of the Mateni class likely ended up in North Korea with the Korean State Railway, where they were initially designated 마더두 class (Madŏdu), and around the 1970s renumbered in the 7200 series. In 2003 an out-of-service Mateni was still parked at Sinuiju.

Additionally, a Mateni was completed by Kawasaki in 1946 and delivered to the KNR as 마터2-34.
