= Sentetsu Pashii-class locomotive =

4-6-2 steam locomotive

Chosen Government Railway Pashii class (パシイ) Korean National Railroad Pasi1 class (파시1) Korean State Railway Pasiha class (바시하)
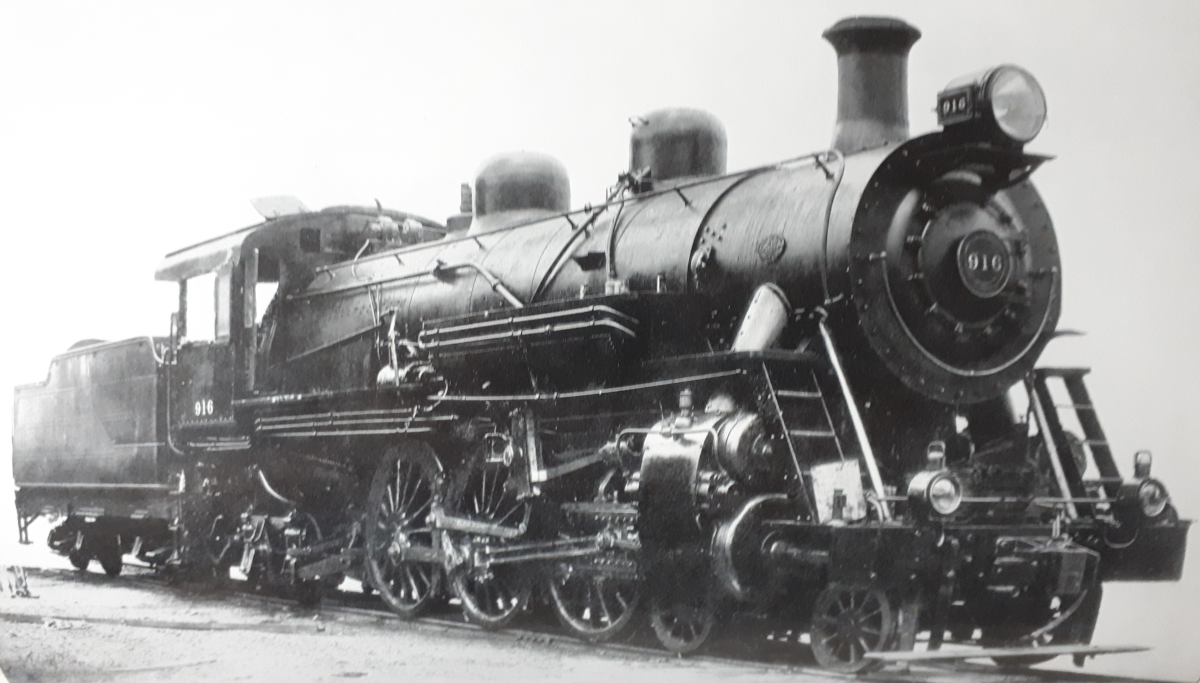
Type and origin
- Power type: Steam
- Builder: Baldwin, Kisha Seizō
- Build date: 1921 (Baldwin, 1–12); 1923 (Kisha Seizō, 13–18)
- Total produced: 18
Specifications
- Configuration
  - Whyte: 4-6-2
- Gauge: 1,435 mm (4 ft 8 1/2 in)
- Driver dia.: 1,750 mm (69 in)
- Length: 21,900 mm (860 in)
- Width: 3,200 mm (10 ft 6 in)
- Height: 4,552 mm (14 ft 11.2 in)
- Loco weight: 94.40 t (92.91 long tons)
- Tender weight: 56.70 t (55.80 long tons)
- Fuel capacity: 8.0 t (7.9 long tons)
- Water cap.: 20,800 L (5,500 US gal)
- Firebox
  - Grate area: 4.33 m^{2} (46.6 sq ft)
- Boiler
  - Small tubes: 168 x 51 mm (2.0 in)
  - Large tubes: 26 x 137 mm (5.4 in)
- Boiler pressure: 13.0 kgf/cm^{2} (185 psi)
- Heating surface
  - Firebox: 17.00 m^{2} (183.0 sq ft)
  - Tubes: 208.90 m^{2} (2,248.6 sq ft)
  - Total surface: 225.90 m^{2} (2,431.6 sq ft)
- Superheater
  - Heating area: 61.20 m^{2} (658.8 sq ft)
- Cylinders: 1
- Cylinder size: 600 mm × 660 mm (24 in × 26 in)
- Valve gear: Walschaerts
Performance figures
- Maximum speed: 95 km/h (59 mph)
- Tractive effort: 141.0 kN (31,700 lb_{f})
Career
- Operators: Chosen Government Railway; Korean National Railroad; Korean State Railway
- Class: Sentetsu: パシイ; KNR: 파시1; KSR: 바시하
- Number in class: Sentetsu: 18; KNR: see text KSR: see text
- Numbers: Sentetsu: パシイ1–パシイ18
- Delivered: 1919

The Pashii class (パシイ) locomotives were a group of steam tender locomotives of the Chosen Government Railway (Sentetsu) with 4-6-2 wheel arrangement. The "Pashi" name came from the American naming system for steam locomotives, under which locomotives with 4-6-2 wheel arrangement were called "Pacific".

In all, Sentetsu owned 144 locomotives of all Pashi classes, of which 141 survived the war; of these, 73 went to the Korean National Railroad in South Korea and 68 to the Korean State Railway in North Korea.

== Description ==
As the 1920s approached, it became clear that Sentetsu needed more powerful locomotives than its existing Amei-class and the five classes of Teho-type locomotives then in service to pull its important passenger trains. Consequently, Sentetsu turned to the Baldwin Locomotive Works once again, this time ordering passenger steam locomotives of the 4-6-2 wheel arrangement.

The first locomotives with a 4-6-2 wheel arrangement to operate on Korean rails was Sentetsu's パシイ (Pashii) class. This was a group of twelve locomotives built by Baldwin in the United States and delivered to Korea in 1921. They had a steel underframe, a hard link type front bogie and a spring type rear bogie, a Franklin injector, an automatic stoker, Gould regulator, and Westinghouse 6ET air brakes. Originally numbered パシ901–パシ918, they were the most American in appearance due to the arrangement of their running boards, and, like American locomotives, had the driver on the left hand side; this proved unpopular with the local crews, as they were the only left-side-drive locomotives in Korea until the arrival of the USATC S160 class after the end of the Pacific War. Despite this drawback, they were considered a success, and in 1923 six copies were delivered from Kisha Seizō. These moved the driver to the right side, and were originally numbered パシ919–パシ924. A year later, they swapped numbers with the Pashini class locomotives that had been delivered in 1923 before the Pashii copies, becoming パシ913–パシ918, and in Sentetsu's 1938 general renumbering, the eighteen locomotives were renumbered パシイ1–パシイ18.

== Postwar ==
The exact dispersal of the Pashii-class locomotives between North and South after the partition of Korea is uncertain, but they were used by the KNR on passenger trains into the 1960s, while they lasted into the 1970s in KSR service, though little of their lives in the North is known.

=== Korean National Railroad 파시1 (Pasi1) class ===
At least ten served with the Korean National Railroad, where they were classified 파시1 (Pasi1). On 1 February 1954, 파시1-7 was pulling a 16-car passenger train southbound at Osan when it was destroyed in an accident. Running tender-ahead with no lights, it hit a South Korean Army lorry, which became wedged beneath the tender, derailing the locomotive and turning it around. The locomotive and three passenger cars were destroyed, and 57 people were killed. None of the KNR units were preserved.

=== Korean State Railway 바시하 (Pasiha) class ===
The number of Pashii-class locomotives taken over by the Korean State Railway is unknown, but they were initially designated 바시하 (Pasiha) class; they were later renumbered with a four-digit serial number, but details are unknown. The service lives and subsequent fate of the Pashii-class engines that operated in the North is likewise unknown.

== Construction ==
Sentetsu running number						Postwar		
1921–1924	1924–1938	1938–1945	Builder	Year	Works no.	Owner	Number	Notes
パシ901	パシ901	パシイ1	Baldwin	1921	54135 of November 1920	KNR	파시1-1	
パシ902	パシ902	パシイ2	Baldwin	1921	?	?	?	?
パシ903	パシ903	パシイ3	Baldwin	1921	?	KNR	파시1-3	
パシ904	パシ904	パシイ4	Baldwin	1921	?	KNR	파시1-4	
パシ905	パシ905	パシイ5	Baldwin	1921	?	KNR	파시1-5	
パシ906	パシ906	パシイ6	Baldwin	1921	?	?	?	?
パシ907	パシ907	パシイ7	Baldwin	1921	?	KNR	파시1-7	Destroyed in an accident on 1 February 1954.
パシ908	パシ908	パシイ8	Baldwin	1921	?	?	?	?
パシ909	パシ909	パシイ9	Baldwin	1921	?	KNR	파시1-9	
パシ910	パシ910	パシイ10	Baldwin	1921	?	KNR	파시1-10	
パシ911	パシ911	パシイ11	Baldwin	1921	?	?	?	?
パシ912	パシ912	パシイ12	Baldwin	1921	54208 of December 1920	KNR	파시1-12	
パシ919	パシ913	パシイ13	Kisha Seizō	1923	678	?	?	?
パシ920	パシ914	パシイ14	Kisha Seizō	1923	679	?	?	?
パシ921	パシ915	パシイ15	Kisha Seizō	1923	680	?	?	?
パシ922	パシ916	パシイ16	Kisha Seizō	1923	681	KNR	파시1-16	
パシ923	パシ917	パシイ17	Kisha Seizō	1923	682	?	?	?
パシ924	パシ918	パシイ18	Kisha Seizō	1923	683	KNR	파시1-18	
Total								18
