= Sentetsu Amei-class locomotives =

Class of 6 Korean 4-4-0 locomotives

Chosen Government Railway Amei class (アメイ) Korean National Railroad Ame1 class (아메1)
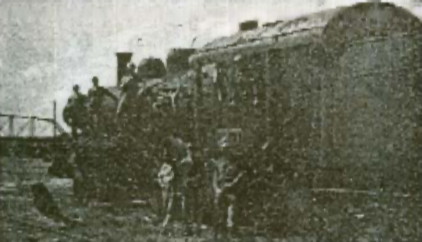
- An Amei-class locomotive of Sentetsu.
Type and origin
- Power type: Steam
- Builder: ALCo
- Build date: 1911
- Total produced: 6
Specifications
- Configuration
  - Whyte: 4-4-0
- Gauge: 1,435 mm (4 ft 8 1/2 in)
- Driver dia.: 1,830 mm (72 in)
- Length: 17,793 mm (700.5 in)
- Width: 3,023 mm (119.0 in)
- Height: 4,228 mm (166.5 in)
- Loco weight: 53.84 t (52.99 long tons; 59.35 short tons)
- Tender weight: 44.58 t (43.88 long tons; 49.14 short tons)
- Fuel type: Coal
- Fuel capacity: 7.2 t (7.1 long tons; 7.9 short tons)
- Water cap.: 14.5 m^{3} (510 cu ft)
- Firebox
  - Grate area: 2.34 m^{2} (25.2 sq ft)
- Boiler
  - Small tubes: 214 x 51 mm (2.0 in)
- Boiler pressure: 12.6 kgf/cm^{2} (179 psi)
- Heating surface
  - Firebox: 12.0 m^{2} (129 sq ft)
  - Tubes: 118.8 m^{2} (1,279 sq ft)
  - Total surface: 130.8 m^{2} (1,408 sq ft)
- Cylinders: 2
- Cylinder size: 450 mm × 660 mm (18 in × 26 in)
- Valve gear: Walschaerts
Performance figures
- Maximum speed: 95 km/h (59 mph)
- Tractive effort: 79.0 kN (17,800 lb_{f})
Career
- Operators: Chosen Government Railway; Korean National Railroad
- Class: Sentetsu: アメイ; KNR: 아머1
- Number in class: 6
- Numbers: Sentetsu: アメイ1 – アメイ6 (1938-1945); KNR: 아머1-1 – 아머1-6

The Amei class (アメイ) was a class of steam tender locomotives of the Chosen Government Railway (Sentetsu) with 4-4-0 wheel arrangement. The "Ame" name came from the American naming system for steam locomotives, under which locomotives with 4-4-0 wheel arrangement were called "American".

== Description ==
Sentetsu introduced the Amei class locomotives in 1911, receiving six from ALCo of the United States. They were fitted with 1,830 mm (72 in) diameter driving wheels, which was a considerable size for the time, giving them a high operational speeds of 95 km/h (59 mph). Unlike the Tehoi class locomotives, the Amei class were equipped with a four-axle tender. They were found to offer no advantage over the Teho types or Sorii class, and no further 4-4-0 locomotives were ever ordered by Sentetsu.

Sentetsu put them into service on the "Ryūki" express, Korea's first express train, operating between Sinuiju and Busan via Gyeongseong, along the Gyeongui Line between Sinuiju and Gyeongseong. Their original numbers are unknown, but they were numbered 401 through 406 in 1918, and then became アメイ1 through アメイ6 numbers in Sentetsu's general renumbering of 1938.

== Postwar: Korean National Railroad 아메1 (Ame1) class ==
After the Liberation of Korea, all six Amei-class locomotives remained in South Korea, where they were designated 아메1 class by the Korean National Railroad.

== Construction ==
Sentetsu running number					
1911–1938	1938–1945	KNR Number	Builder	Year	Notes
51	アメイ1	아메1-1	ALCo	1911	
52	アメイ2	아메1-2	ALCo	1911	
53	アメイ3	아메1-3	ALCo	1911	
54	アメイ4	아메1-4	ALCo	1911	
55	アメイ5	아메1-5	ALCo	1911	
56	アメイ6	아메1-6	ALCo	1911	
