= Sentetsu Sorii-class locomotives =

2-8-0 steam locomotive

Chosen Government Railway Sorii class (ソリイ) Korean National Railroad Sori1 class (소리1)
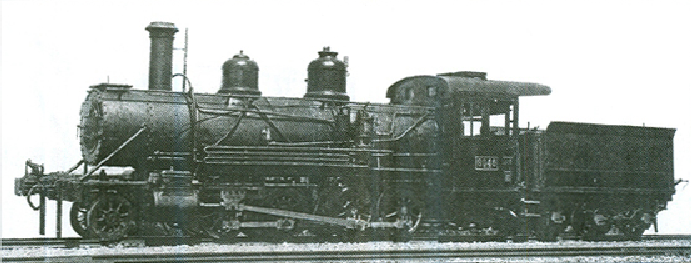
- One of Sentetsu's Sorii-class locomotives, prior to 1938.
Type and origin
- Power type: Steam
- Builder: Baldwin
- Build date: 1904
- Total produced: 6
Specifications
- Configuration
  - Whyte: 2-8-0
- Gauge: 1,435 mm (4 ft 8 1/2 in)
- Driver dia.: 1,370 mm (54 in)
- Length: 17,991 mm (708.3 in)
- Width: 2,960 mm (117 in)
- Height: 4,570 mm (180 in)
- Loco weight: 66.60 t (65.55 long tons; 73.41 short tons)
- Tender weight: 44.46 t (43.76 long tons; 49.01 short tons)
- Fuel type: Coal
- Fuel capacity: 7.3 t (7.2 long tons; 8.0 short tons)
- Water cap.: 15.1 m^{3} (530 cu ft)
- Firebox
  - Grate area: 4.05 m^{2} (43.6 sq ft)
- Boiler
  - Small tubes: 248 x 51 mm (2.0 in)
- Boiler pressure: 12.6 kgf/cm^{2} (179 psi)
- Heating surface
  - Firebox: 14.90 m^{2} (160.4 sq ft)
  - Tubes: 157.30 m^{2} (1,693.2 sq ft)
  - Total surface: 182.20 m^{2} (1,961.2 sq ft)
- Cylinder size: 508 mm × 660 mm (20.0 in × 26.0 in)
- Valve gear: Stephenson
Performance figures
- Maximum speed: 70 km/h (43 mph)
- Tractive effort: 13,300 kgf (130,000 N; 29,000 lbf)
Career
- Operators: Chosen Government Railway; Korean National Railroad
- Class: ソリイ (Sentetsu) 소리1 (KNR)
- Number in class: 6
- Numbers: ソリイ1–ソリイ6 (Sentetsu) 소리1-1–소리1-6 (KNR)
- Delivered: 1904

The Sorii class (ソリイ) was a class of steam tender locomotives of the Chosen Government Railway (Sentetsu) with 2-8-0 wheel arrangement. The "Sori" name came from the American naming system for steam locomotives, under which locomotives with 2-8-0 wheel arrangement were called "Consolidation".

== Description ==
Built by the Baldwin Locomotive Works of the United States in 1894, the ソリイ (Sorii) class locomotives were bought second-hand by the Imperial Japanese Army for use by the Temporary Military Railway in Korea. In 1906, the Temporary Military Railway was taken over the Government-General of Korea to create the National Railway, which became Sentetsu in 1910. First numbered 101–106, they became numbers 1001–1006 in 1918, and finally in Sentetsu's 1938 general renumbering, they were given the numbers ソリイ1 through ソリイ6.

== Postwar: Korean National Railroad 소리1 (Sori1) class ==
After the partition of Korea, all six remained in the South, becoming Korean National Railroad class Sori1 (소리1), numbered 소리1-1 through 소리1-6.

== Construction ==
Sentetsu running number						
1906–1918	1918–1938	1938–1945	KNR Number	Builder	Year	Notes
101	ソリ1001	アメイ1	소리1-1	Baldwin	1894	
102	ソリ1002	アメイ2	소리1-2	Baldwin	1894	
103	ソリ1003	アメイ3	소리1-3	Baldwin	1894	
104	ソリ1004	アメイ4	소리1-4	Baldwin	1894	
105	ソリ1005	アメイ5	소리1-5	Baldwin	1894	
106	ソリ1006	アメイ6	소리1-6	Baldwin	1894	
