= Chōsen Government Railway =

1910–1945 Japanese company in Korea

Chōsen Government Railway 朝鮮總督府鐵道 조선총독부 철도

Overview
- Headquarters: Keijō
- Locale: Korea, Empire of Japan
- Dates of operation: 1910–1945
- Predecessor: Korea Railway
- Successor: Korean State Railway; Korean National Railroad

Technical
- Track gauge: 1,435 mm (4 ft 8 1/2 in); 762 mm (2 ft 6 in)
- Electrification: 3000 V DC (1,435 mm)

Chōsen Government Railway

Japanese name
- Kanji: 朝鮮總督府鐵道
Transcriptions
- Romanization: Chōsen Sōtokufu Tetsudō

Alternative Japanese name
- Kanji: 鮮鐵
Transcriptions
- Romanization: Sentetsu

Korean name
- Hangul: 조선총독부 철도
- Hanja: 朝鮮總督府鐵道
Transcriptions
- Revised Romanization: Joseon Chongdokbu Cheoldo
- McCune–Reischauer: Chosŏn Ch'ongdokbu Ch'ŏldo

Alternative Korean name
- Hangul: 선철
- Hanja: 鮮鐵
Transcriptions
- Revised Romanization: Seoncheol
- McCune–Reischauer: Sŏnch'ŏl

The Chōsen Government Railway (朝鮮總督府鐵道, Chōsen sōtokufu tetsudō) (Korean: 조선총독부 철도; RR: Joseon Chongdokbu Cheoldo) was a state-owned railway company in Korea during Japanese rule. It was also colloquially known by the abbreviated name Sentetsu (鮮鐵). It was the operational division of the Railway Bureau of the Government-General of Chōsen (朝鮮總督府鐵道局, Chōsen sōtokufu tetsudōkyoku; Korean: 철도국; RR: Cheoldoguk), which managed and operated railways in Chōsen, as well as supervised privately owned railway companies.

== Public identity ==
The Chosen Government Railway's public identity changed a number of times over the 39 years that it existed. In the first four years of its existence, its name changed three times to reflect the rapid changes in Korea's political environment between 1905 and 1910. Later, for eight years Korea's railways were managed by the South Manchuria Railway - which was almost a state-level actor in the region on its own - before finally regaining its independence for the last twenty years of its life.

- 1906–1909: National Railway (統監府鐵道, Tōkanfu Tetsudō; 통감부 철도, Tonggambu Cheoldo)
- 1909–1910: Korea Railway (韓國鐵道, Kankoku Tetsudō; 한국철도, Hanguk Cheoldo)
- 1910–1917: Chosen Government Railway (朝鮮總督府鐵道, Chōsen Sōtokufu Tetsudō; 조선총독부 철도, Joseon Chongdokbu Cheoldo)
- 1917–1925: South Manchuria Railway (南満州鉄道, Minami-Manshū Tetsudō; 남만주 철도, Nammanju Cheoldo)
- 1925–1945: Chosen Government Railway (朝鮮總督府鐵道, Chōsen Sōtokufu Tetsudō; 조선총독부 철도, Joseon Chongdokbu Cheoldo)

== History ==
Chosen Government Railway third-class carriage type Ha9 number 1026

- 20 August 1899 - Gyeongin Railway from Incheon to Noryangjin (Seoul) opened;
- 1 October 1902 - Gyeongbu Railway from Yeongdeungpo (Seoul) to Myeonghak (Anyang) opened;
- 1 November 1903 - Gyeongbu Railway acquired the Gyeongin Railway;
- 21 February 1904 - Temporary Military Railway established by the Imperial Japanese Army;
- 28 April 1905 - Military Railway's Gyeongui Line from Yongsan to Sinuiju opened;
- 1 July 1906 - Railway Office of the Administration of the Japanese Resident-General of Korea established; Gyeongbu Railway nationalised;
- 1 September 1906 - Temporary Military Railway transferred to the Railway Office and merged with the Gyeongbu Railway to create the National Railway Administration (統監府鐵道管理局, Tōkanfu Tetsudō Kanrikyoku; 통감부 철도관리국, Tonggambu Cheoldogwalliguk);
- 16 December 1909 - National Railway Administration renamed Korea Railway Administration (鐵道員韓國鐵道管理局, Tetsudōin Kankoku Tetsudō Kanrikyoku; 철도원 한국철도관리국, Cheoldowon Hanguk Cheoldogwalliguk);
- 29 August 1910 - Korea annexed by Japan, Government-General of Korea established;
- 1 October 1910 - Korea Railway Administration becomes the Railway Bureau of the Government-General of Korea, (朝鮮總督府鐵道局, Chōsen Sōtokufu Tetsudōkyoku; 조선총독부 철도국, Joseon Chongdokbu Cheoldoguk) (Sentetsu), its operating arm called "Chosen Government Railway" in English;
- 1 November 1911 - Bridge across the Yalu River completed, establishing a connection to the South Manchuria Railway (Mantetsu);
- 31 July 1917 - Management of Sentetsu and private railways in Korea transferred to the South Manchuria Railway, Railway Bureau becomes Mantetsu Keijō/Gyeongseong Administration (満鐵京城管理局, Mantetsu Keijō Kanrikyoku; 만철 경성 관리국, Mancheol Gyeongseong Gwalliguk);
- 1 April 1925 - Management and operation of railways in Korea returned to the Railway Bureau, Sentetsu independent again;
- 1 October 1934 - Management of the Sentetsu lines north of Cheongjin transferred to the South Manchuria Railway;
- 12 March 1943 - Railway Bureau abolished, Chosen Government Railway transferred to the Ministry of Transportation.
- 15 August 1945 - Sentetsu abolished.

After the end of the World War II, all railways in Korea were nationalised, with the lines in South Korea becoming part of the Korean National Railroad, and those in North Korea becoming part of the Korean State Railway.

== Organisation ==
The organisation of the Railway Bureau as of 1 September 1941:

- General Affairs Section
  - Railway Library
  - Railway Clinic
- Research Division
- Inspection Division
- Marketing Division
- Transportation Division
- Construction Division
- Improvements Division
- Track Maintenance Division
- Work Division
- Electrical Division
- Accounting Department
- Railway Employees' Training School
- Regional Railway Bureaux: Gyeongseong (Seoul), Busan, Hamhŭng
- Railway Offices: Gyeongseong, Busan, Daejeon, P'yŏngyang, Sunch'ŏn, Wŏnsan, Sŏngjin, Kanggye
- Construction Offices: Gyeongseong, P'yŏngyang, Andong, Kangneung
- Improvements Offices: Gyeongseong, Busan, P'yŏngyang
- Railway Factories: Gyeongseong, Busan, Ch'ŏngjin
- Gyeongseong Railway Hospital

The Railway Bureau also operated a system of sports clubs. Today's Daejeon Korail FC is the direct descendant of Sentetsu's football club, which won the All-Korea football championship in 1939; Sentetsu's ice hockey club was the first to ever play a game of that sport in Korea, playing a game against the team of the Tokyo Imperial University in 1928, and later played the first game between two Korean clubs, against a team from the Gyeongseong Imperial University.

== Motive power ==
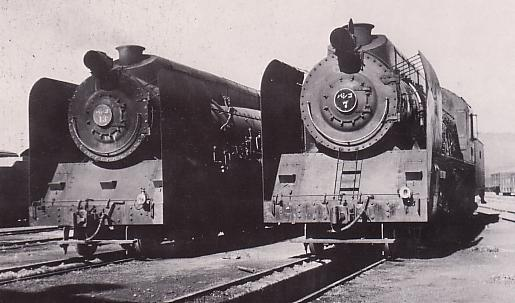
Steam locomotives Pashiko 13 and Pashisa 7 of the Chosen Government Railways.

Sentetsu, or more accurately its predecessor, the National Railway, was created through the merger of the Temporary Military Railway and the Gyeongbu Railway, which had previously absorbed the Gyeongin Railway, on 1 September 1906. At the time of the merger, the Korean locomotive fleet was as follows:

Type	Wheel Arrangement	Gyeongbu Railway	Temporary Military Railway	Total
Moga	2-6-0T	4	-	4
Pure	2-6-2T	18	52	70
Sori	2-8-0	6	-	6
Teho	4-6-0	12	-	12
4-Wheel	0-4-0	0	2	2
Total		40	54	94

When the National Railway became Sentetsu in 1910, the locomotive fleet had increased by only 21 engines; by the time Mantetsu took over the management of Korea's railways in 1917, the Sentetsu motive power fleet had grown from 115 in 1910 to 175. Mantetsu management lasted just under a decade, and by the time Sentetsu regained its independence in 1925 the locomotive park stood at 247 engines. The 1930s, however, saw enormous growth in Sentetsu's fleet. From 302 locomotives in 1930, by the end of the decade the number had more than doubled to 740 engines in 1940, and reached 1,000 in 1944. When Sentetsu was abolished after the end of the Pacific War there were 1,302 locomotives on the roster.

Year	Steam Locomotives (s.g./n.g.)	Electric Locomotives (s.g.)	Passenger cars (s.g/n.g.)	Freight cars (s.g/n.g.)	Powered railcars (s.g/n.g.)	Notes
1906	94		155	593		National Railway
1909	109		159	1,036		Korea Railway
1910	115		159	1,186		Chosen Government Railway
1914	165		335	1,602		
1918	191		420	2,047		South Manchuria Railway Gyeongseong Bureau
1923	243		536	2,656	4	
1925	247		591	2,766	3	Chosen Government Railway
1930	302/31		733/75	3,313/319	10/13	
1935	393*		897	4,426	34/13	
1940	740*		1,534	10,068	40/13	
1941	802*		1,746	11,244	40/13	
1942	840*		1,852	12,030	47?/13	
1943	970*	5	1,887	13,057	47?/13	
1944	1,236*	9	1,447	15,156	47?/13	
1945	1,302*	9	2,027	15,352	47?/13	
* = this number includes both standard and narrow gauge locomotives, as well as locomotives taken on loan from the South Manchuria Railway and the Manchukuo National Railway.

=== Classification system ===
Sentetsu's first classification system was a simple, number-based system, in which, loosely, the hundreds digit of the running number indicated the locomotive's wheel arrangement - numbers in the 100s were 2-6-0 or 2-8-0, those in the 200s and 300s were 4-6-0, the 400s were 4-4-0, the 500s were 4-6-4, and so on. This slightly modified in 1918, the year after Mantetsu took over management of Korea's railways, with some of the numbers being redefined, and after Mantetsu introduced a new classification system for its own locomotives in 1920, the system for Korean locomotives was once again adjusted, retaining the number series as they were in 1918, but adding new class designations - likewise reflecting wheel arrangement - akin to those used for Mantetsu's own locomotives, based on the common American name for the given wheel arrangement. Thus, from the 1920s until 1938, Sentetsu's locomotive had both a katakana-based class designation as well as a running number; however, unlike Mantetsu's engines, those of Sentetsu didn't have the class designation marked on the locomotive itself.

Class	Number series	Wheel arrangement (Whyte)	Wheel arrangement (UIC)	American name
アメ; Ame	400	4-4-0	2′B	American
バル; Baru	500	4-6-4	2'C2'	Baltic
ゴロ; Goro	?	2-4-2	1'C1'	Columbia
ケハ; Keha	?	n/a	n/a	Kerosene (petrol-powered railcars)
ジハ; Jiha	?	n/a	n/a	Diesel (diesel-powered railcars)
ミカ; Mika	800, 1700	2-8-2	1′D1′	Mikado
モガ; Moga	100	2-6-0	1′C	Mogul
パシ; Pashi	900	4-6-2	2′C1′	Pacific
プレ; Pure	200, 300	2-6-2	1′C1′	Prairie
サタ; Sata	1800	2-10-2	1′E1′	Santa Fe
ソリ; Sori	100	2-8-0	1′D	Consolidation
シグ; Shigu	?	2-2-0	1′A	Single
テホ; Teho	600, 700	4-6-0	2′C	Ten-Wheeler

In 1938, Mantetsu introduced a unified classification and numbering system for its own locomotives, as well as for those of its de jure subsidiary, the North China Transportation Company, and its de facto subsidiary, the Manchukuo National Railway. At the same time Sentetsu - though it had regained its independence in 1925 - introduced its own variant of the new Mantetsu system, which included the locomotives owned by private railways in Korea.

The new system consisted of a class designation and a running number counting sequentially from 1; the class designation had three katakana characters. The first two, indicating wheel arrangement, remained as they were in the previous system, with the addition of one: マテ (Mate), from "Mountain", for 4-8-2 locomotives introduced in 1939. The third katakana in the class name was the class number, derived from the first syllable of the corresponding Japanese numbers from one to ten:

- 1 - i (イ), from イチ, "ichi"
- 2 - ni (ニ), from ニ, "ni"
- 3 - sa (サ), from サン, "san"
- 4 - shi (シ), from シ, "shi"
- 5 - ko (コ), from ゴ, "go"
- 6 - ro (ロ), from ロク, "roku"
- 7 - na (ナ), from ナナ, "nana"
- 8 - ha (ハ), from ハチ, "hachi"
- 9 - ku (ク), from ク, "ku"
- 10 - ji (チ), from ヂウ, "jyu"

Thus, the third class of locomotives with a 4-6-2 wheel arrangement would be called パシサ - Pashisa.

Narrow-gauge steam locomotives did not use the designation forms based on wheel arrangement; instead, they all used ナキ ("Naki", from English "Narrow Gauge") plus a class number. Petrol-powered narrow gauge railcars were classified ナケハ.

Classification of electric locomotives was slightly different from that used for steam locomotives. Although this also used the two character + class number arrangement, the first character was デ ("de", from 電気, denki, "electric"), while the second character indicated the number of powered axles (using the same number abbreviations as used for the class number). In practice, Sentetsu had only two types of electric locomotive, both with six powered axles - デロイ (DeRoI) and デロニ (DeRoNi).

This classification system later formed the basis of the systems used by both the Korean National Railroad in South Korea and the Korean State Railway in North Korea.

=== Locomotive Types ===
==== Standard gauge ====
Steam locomotives (tender)
Class & numbers (1906–1918)	Class & numbers (1918–1938)	Class & numbers (1938–1945)	Wheel arrangement	Builder	Built	Total in class (Sentetsu only)	Image	Notes
?	アメ401–アメ406	アメイ1–アメイ6 (Amei)	4-4-0	ALCo	1911	6		All six to KNR in 1945.
-	-	マテイ1–マテイ50 (Matei)	4-8-2	Gyeongseong, Kisha Seizō	1939–1945	50		
-	-	マテニ1–マテニ33 (Mateni)	4-8-2	Kawasaki	1939–1945	33		
-	ミカ701–ミカ712	ミカイ1–ミカイ12 (Sentetsu Mikai)	2-8-2	Baldwin	1919	12		
-	-	ミカイ (various) (Mantetsu Mikai)	2-8-2	various	various	≤54		As many as 54 on loan to Sentetsu from Mantetsu and MNR at war's end.
-	ミカ801–ミカ812	ミカニ1–ミカニ12 (Mikani)	2-8-2	ALCo	1919	12		
-	ミカ1701–ミカ1770	ミカサ1–ミカサ297, ミカサ303–ミカサ313 (Mikasa)	2-8-2	Gyeongseong, Kisha Seizō, Nippon Sharyō, Hitachi, Kawasaki	1927–1945	308		8 built for the West Chosen Central Railway and 38 for the Central China Railway in 1943–1944. More built for KNR in 1946.
-		ミカシ1–ミカシ24 (Mikashi)	2-8-2	Kawasaki	1939–1942	24		
-	パシ901–パシ912 (1921–1924), パシ919–パシ924 (1921–1924) パシ901–パシ918 (1921–1924)	パシイ1–パシイ18 (Pashii)	4-6-2	Baldwin, Kisha Seizō	1921, 1923	18		
-	パシ913–パシ918 (1921–1924) パシ919–パシ924 (1921–1924)	パシニ1–パシニ6 (Pashini)	4-6-2	ALCo	1923	6		All six to KSR in 1945.
-	パシ957–パシ962	パシサ1–パシサ6 (Sentetsu Pashisa)	4-6-2	Kawasaki	1923	6		
-	-	パシサ (various) (Mantetsu Pashisa)	2-8-2	various	various	5		5 on loan to Sentetsu from Mantetsu at war's end.
-	パシ971–パシ990	パシサ1–パシサ82 (Pashishi)	4-6-2	Kawasaki, Nippon Sharyō	1927–1943	82		10 built for Central China Railway in 1942–1943.
-	-	パシコ1–パシコ40 (Pashiko)	4-6-2	Gyeongseong, Kawasaki	1939–1944	40		
-	-	パシサ (various) (Mantetsu Pashisa)	4-6-2	various	various	5		5 on loan to Sentetsu from Mantetsu at war's end; all five to KSR in 1945.
-	-	パシロ (various) (Kokusen Pashiro)	4-6-2	various	various	25		25 on loan to Sentetsu from the Manchukuo National Ry at war's end; all 25 to KSR in 1945.
101–106	ソリ1001–ソリイ1006	ソリイ1–ソリイ6 (Sorii)	2-8-0	Baldwin	1894	6		Bought second-hand by the Temporary Military Railway in 1904.
-	-	ソリロ (various) (Kokusen Soriro)	2-8-0	various	various	8		8 on loan to Sentetsu from the Manchukuo National Ry at war's end.
301–306	テホ601–テホ606	テホイ1–テホイ6 (Tehoi)	4-6-0	Baldwin	1906	6		Originally Gyeongbu Railway 300 series.
201–221	テホ601–テホ606	テホニ1–テホニ21 (Tehoni)	4-6-0	Baldwin, Brooks	1906–1909	21		First six originally Gyeongbu Railway 200 series.
222–230	テホ611–テホ619	テホサ1–テホサ10 (Tehosa)	4-6-0	ALCo, Gyeongseong	1911, 1938	10		One copy built at Gyeongseong in 1938.
235–238	テホ661–テホ664	テホシ1–テホシ4 (Tehoshi)	4-6-0	ALCo	1913	4		All four to KSR in 1945.
271–306	テホ701–テホ736	テホコ1–テホコ36 (Tehoko)	4-6-0	ALCo, Shahekou	1917–1919	36		
-	テホ751–テホ789	テホロ1–テホロ95 (Tehoro)	4-6-0	Gyeongseong, Kawasaki, Hitachi, Mitsubishi	1927–1942	95		

Steam locomotives (tank)
Class & numbers (1906–1918)	Class & numbers (1918–1938)	Class & numbers (1938–1945)	Wheel arrangement	Builder	Built	Total in class (Sentetsu only)	Image	Notes
501–512	バル501–バル512	バルイ1–バルイ12 (Barui)	4-6-4T	Baldwin	1913–1914	12		
-	ゴロ61–ゴロ63	ゴロイ1–ゴロイ3 (Goroi)	2-4-2T	Kisha Seizō	1924	3		All three to KSR in 1945.
1–4	モガ101–モガ104	モガイ1–モガイ4 (Mogai)	4-6-4T	Brooks	1899	4		Originally Gyeongin Railway 1–4
1–70	プレ1–プレ70	プレイ1–プレイ23 (Purei)	2-6-2T	Baldwin	1901, 1906	70		Originally Gyeongbu Railway 1–18 and Temporary Military Railway 1–52. Rebuilt to Pureshi-class, only 23 unrebuilt by 1938.
71–79	プレ271–プレ279	プレニ1–プレニ9 (Pureni)	2-6-2T	Baldwin	1905, 1935	9+1		Originally Gyeongbu Railway. 1st プレ276 wrecked, replacement built in 1935 with same number.
81–94	プレ281–プレ294	プレサ1–プレサ14 (Puresa)	2-6-2T	Borsig	1911–1912	14		
-	?	プレサ1–プレサ46 (Pureshi)	2-6-2T	Baldwin (builder); Gyeongseong (rebuilder)	1925–?	46		Rebuilt from Purei-class.
-	プレ301–プレ302	プレコ1–プレコ2 (Pureko)	2-6-2T	Baldwin	1911	2		Bought second-hand by Domun Railway in 1920, to Sentetsu 1929. Both to KSR in 1945.
-	プレ311–プレ312	プレロ1–プレロ2 (Purero)	2-6-2T	O&K	1911	2		Bought second-hand by Domun Railway in 1920, to Sentetsu 1929. Both to KSR in 1945.
-	プレ321–プレ326 プレ341–プレ348	プレナ1–プレナ93 (Purena)	2-6-2T	Hitachi, Kawasaki, Gyeongseong, Nippon Sharyō	1930–1941	93		プレ341–プレ348 built for Gyeongchun Railway in 1930, bought by Sentetsu in 1936. Nineteen others built for Mantetsu in 1935. One still in service with KSR.
-	プレ351–プレ362	プレハ1–プレハ38 (Pureha)	2-6-2T	Gyeongseong, Hitachi, Kisha Seizō	1932, 1939	38		
-	サタ1801–サタ1819	サタイ1–サタイ24 (Satai)	2-6-2T	Gyeongseong, Hitachi	1934–1939	24		
4輪 (Yonrin)	?	-	0-4-0T	Hohenzollern	1899	2		Two bought second-hand by the Gyeongbu Railway in April 1906.

Electric locomotives
Class & numbers	Wheel arrangement	Builder	Built	Total in class	Image	Notes
デロイ1–デロイ9 (DeRoI)	1-C+C-1	Toshiba, Kisha Seizō	1943–1944	9		Only five delivered by war's end; rest delivered to KNR in 1946–1947.
デロイ31–デロイ33 (DeRoI)	1-C+C-1	Mitsubishi	-	-		Could not be delivered due to war's end; delivered in 1946 to KNR.
デロニ1–デロニ4 (DeRoNi)	1-C+C-1	Hitachi	1943–1944	4		All delivered to Sentetsu.

==== Standard gauge railcars ====
- Shiki-class (シキ) steam railcars
- Keha-class (ケハ) petrol railcars
- Jiha-class (ジハ) Diesel railcar

==== Narrow gauge steam locomotives ====
- Nakii-class (ナキイ) steam locomotives
- Nakini-class (ナキニ) steam locomotives
- Nakisa-class (ナキサ) steam locomotives
- Nakishi-class (ナキシ) steam locomotives
- Nakiko-class (ナキコ) steam locomotives
- Nakiro-class (ナキロ) steam locomotives
- Nakina-class (ナキナ) steam locomotives
- Nakiha-class (ナキハ) steam locomotives

==== Narrow gauge railcars ====
- Nakeha-class (ナケハ) petrol railcars

== Routes ==
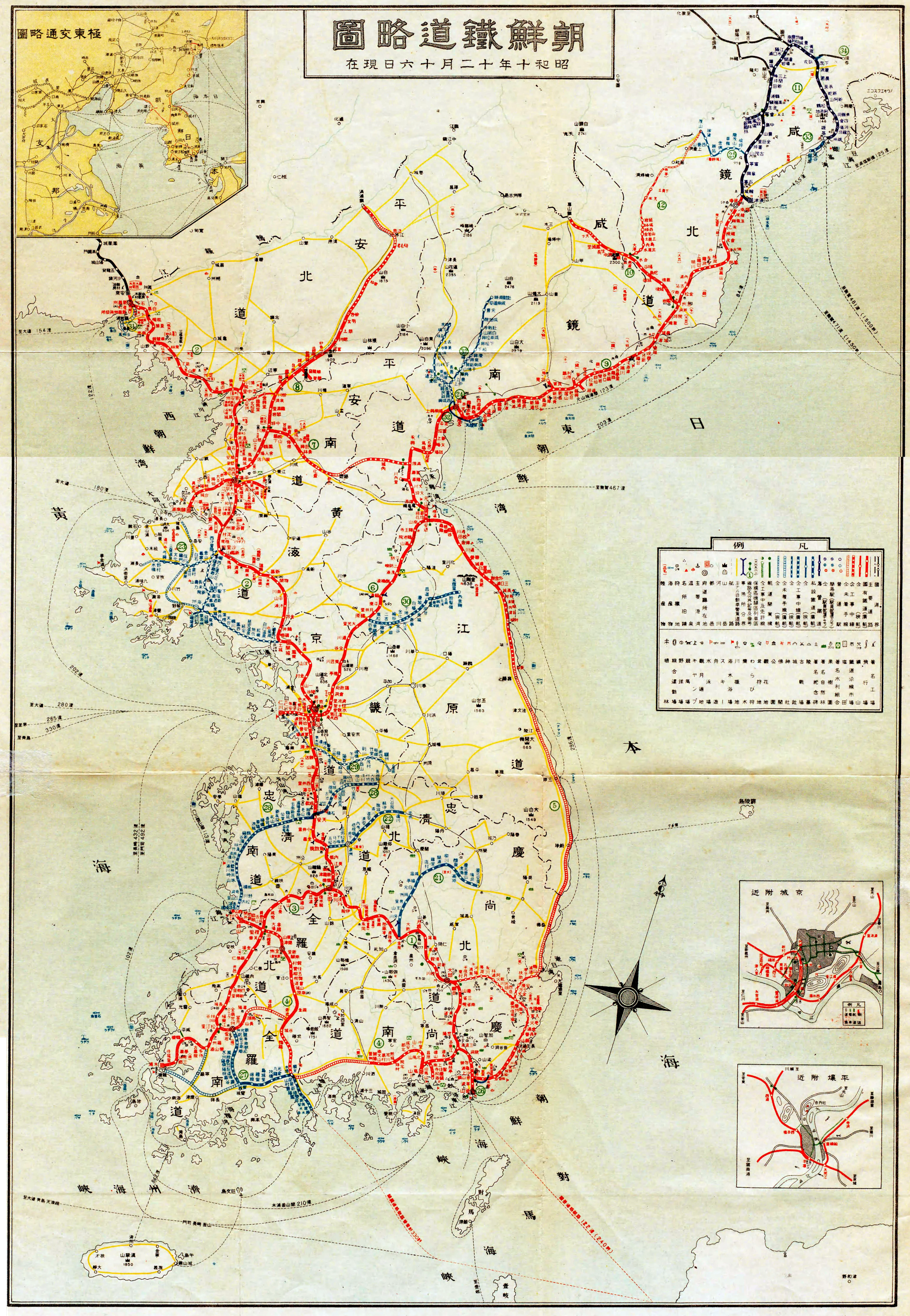
Railway map of Korea from the mid-1930s. Sentetsu lines are in red; the blue lines indicate rail lines owned by private companies, along with the South Manchuria Railway and the Manchukuo National Railway.

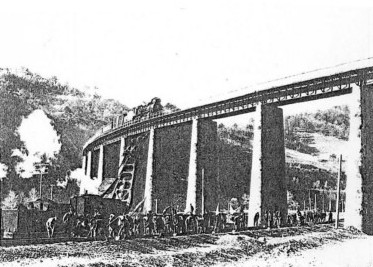
Construction of the Seokbong-Changpyeong section of the Hamgyeong Line in 1916.

The following is a list of the rail lines of the Chosen Government Railway in 1945. The name in brackets is the Japanese form of the name, which was the officially used form.

=== Standard gauge ===
- Bakcheon Line (Hakusen Line): Maengjungni–Bakcheon, 1926–1945 (to KSR Pakch'on Line)
- Bongcheon Colliery Line (Hōsen Tankō Line): Bongcheon–Bongcheon Colliery, 1933–1945 (to KSR Pongch'ŏn Colliery Line)
- Botonggang Line (Futsūkō Line): Botonggang–Pyeongcheon, 1944–1945 (to KSR P'yŏngyang Thermal Power Plant Line)
- Bukcheong Line (Hokusei Line): Sinbukcheong–Bukcheong, 1929–1945 (to KSR Tŏksŏng Line)
- Busan Jochajang Line (Fuzan Sōshajō Line): Sasang–Beomil, 1944–1945 (to KNR Gaya Line)
- Chaho Line (Shako Line): Jeungsan–Chaho, 1929–1945 (to KSR Riwŏn Line)
- Cheolsan Line (Tetsuzan Line): Riwon Cheolsan–Raheung, 1929–1945 (to KSR Riwŏn Line)
- Cheongjin Wharf Line (Seishinfutō Line): Cheongjin–Cheongjinbudu (Cheongjinhang), 1940–1945 (to KSR Ch'ŏngjin Port Line)
- West Cheongju Line (Nishi-Seishū Line): Jochiwon–Cheongjugu, 1925–1945 (to KNR West Cheongju Line)
- Cheongna Line (Seira Line): Cheongjin–Cheongam, 1945 (to KSR Ch'ŏngra Line)
- Cheonnaeri Line (Sennairi Line): Ryongdam–Cheonnaeri, 1927–1945 (to KSR Ch'ŏnnae Line)
- Cheonseong Colliery Line (Tensei Tankō Line): Sinchang–Cheonseong, 1936–1945 (to KSR Ch'ŏnsŏng Colliery Line)
- Daean Line (Taian Line): Giyang–Daean Hwamul, <1937–1945 (to KSR Taean Line)
- Daegu Line (Taikyū Line): Daegu–Yeongcheon, 1938–1945 (to KNR Daegu Line)
- Daejeon Line (Taiden Line): Daejeon–Seodaejeon, 1944–1945 (to KNR Daejeon Line)
- Deokdal Branch Line (Tokutachi Branch Line): Cheongdan–Deokdal, 1944–1945 (to KSR Tŏktal Line)
- Dongcheon Line (Tōsen Line): Charyeongwan–Dongcheon, <1937–1945 (to KSR Ch'ŏlsan Line)
- Donghae Bukbu Line (Tōkai Hokubu Line): Anbyeon–Oegeumgang–Kamho–Chogu–Jejin–Yangyang, 1929–1945 (Anbyeon–Kamho to KSR Kŭmgangsan Ch'ŏngnyŏn Line, Chogu–Yangyang to KNR Donghae Bukbu Line)
- Donghae Jungbu Line (Tōkai Chūbu Line): Daegu–Gyeongju–Haksan, Gyeongju–Ulsan, 1928–1945
- Donghae Nambu Line (Tōkai Nanbu Line): Haksan–Pohang–Gyeongju–Ulsan–Busan, 1934–1945 (to KNR Donghae Nambu Line)
- Gang-an Line (Kōgan Line): Sinuiju–Gang-an, 1936–1945 (to KSR Kang'an Line)
- Gangdeok Line (Kōtoku Line): Nanam–Suseong, 1942–1945 (to KSR Kangdŏk Line)
- Gilhye Line (Kikkei Line): Kilju–Hyesanjin, 1933–1945 (to KSR Paektusan Ch'ŏngnyŏn Line)
- Gobi Line (Kōbi Line): Ripseongni–Gobi, 1934–1945 (to KSR Kobi Line)
- Gocham Colliery Line (Koten Tankō Line): Gocham–Sinmyeongcheon, ~1937–1945 (to KSR Koch'am Colliery Line)
- Gwangju Line (Kōjū Line): Songjeongni–Gwangju–Damyang, 1928–1945 (to KNR Gwangju Line)
- Gyeomipo Line (Kenjiho Line): Hwanghae Hwangju–Gyeomipo, 1910–1945 (to KSR Songrim Line)
- Gyeongbu Line (Keifu Line): Gyeongseong–Busan, 1910–1945 (to KNR Gyeongbu Line)
- Gyeonggyeong Line (Keikyō Line): East Gyeongseong–Jecheon–Yeongju–Gyeongju 1942–1945 (to KNR Jungang Line)
- Gyeongin Line (Keijin Line): Gyeongseong–Incheon, 1910–1945 (to KNR Gyeongin Line)
- Gyeongjeon Nambu Line (Keizen Nanbu Line): Samnangjin–Masan–Jinju, 1931–1945 (to KNR Gyeongjeon Nambu Line → 1956 Jinju Line)
- Gyeongjeon Seobu Line (Keizen Seibu Line): Songjeongni–Suncheon, 1936–1945 (to KNR Gyeongjeon Line)
- Gyeongui Line (Keigi Line): (Yongsan) Gyeongseong–Pyeongyang–Sinuiju, 1910–1945 (Pyeongyang–Sinuiju to KSR P'yŏngŭi Line, Pyeongyang–Kaesong–Panmun to KSR P'yŏngbu Line, Jangdan–Seoul to KNR Gyeongui Line; 1964 Yangsi–Namsi to KSR Paengma Line)
- Gyeongwon Line (Keigen Line): Yongsan (Gyeongseong)–Woljeongni–Gagok–Pyeonggang–Wonsan, 1911–1945 (Seoul–Woljeongni to KNR Gyeongwon Line, Gagok–Pyeonggang–Wonsan to KSR Kangwŏn Line)
- Hamgyeong Line (Kankyō Line): Wonsan–Kowon–Cheongjin–Sangsambong, 1941–1945 (Wonsan–Kowon to KSR Kangwŏn Line, Kowon–Cheongjin to KSR P'yŏngra Line, Cheongjin–Sambong to KSR Hambuk Line)
- Hoeryeong Colliery Line (Kainei Tankō Line): Hoeryeong–Gyerim–Singyerim, 1940–1945 (to KSR Hoeryŏng Colliery Line)
- Honam Line (Konan Line): Daejeon–Mokpo, 1914–1917 (to SMR Gyeongseong Honam Line); 1925–1945 (to KNR Honam Line)
- Husan Line (Kōsan Line): Husan–Yangmak, <1937–1945 (to KSR Husan Line)
- Hwanghae Main Line (Kōkai Main Line): Sariwon–Haseong, 1944–1945 (to KSR Hwanghae Ch'ŏngnyŏn Line)
- Hwasun Line (Washun Line): Hwasun–Bogam, 1942–1945 (to KNR Hwasun Line)
- Jeokgi Line (Shakugi Line): Bujeon–Jeokgibudu, 1945 (to KNR Uam Line)
- Jeolla Line (Zenra Line): Yeosu–Suncheon–Jeonju–Iri (Iksan), 1936–1945 (to KNR Jeolla Line)
- Jinhae Line (Chinkai Line): Changwon–Jinhae, 1926–1945 (to KNR Jinhae Line)
- Joyang Colliery Line (Chōyō Tankō Line): Gaecheon–Joyang, 1932–1945 (to KSR Choyang Colliery Line)
- Judong Line (Sōtō Line): Gaya–Bujeon, 1944–1945 (to KNR Bujeon Line)
- Junhyeok Line (Shunkaku Line): Gaecheon–Junhyeongni, ?–1945 (to KNR Chunhyŏk Line)
- Manpo Line (Manho Line): Suncheon–Gaecheon–Kanggye–Manpo, 1933–1945 (to KSR Manp'o Line)
- Masan Harbour Line (Masan Rinkō Line): Masan–Masanhang, 1910–1945 (to KNR Masan Harbour Line)
- Mijeon Line (Biden Line): Mijeon–Nakdonggang, 1945 (to KNR Mijeon Line)
- Musan Line (Mosan Line): Komusan–Musan, 1944–1945 (to KSR Musan Line)
- Myeongdang Line (Meidō Line): Cheongnyong–Myeongdang, 1925–1945 (to KSR Myŏngdang Line)
- Osicheon Line (Goshisen Line): Daeocheon–Osicheon, 1937–1945 (to KSR Osich'ŏn Line)
- Pyeongnam Line (Heinan Line): Pyeongyang–Jinnampo, 1910–1945 (to KSR P'yŏngnam Line)
- Pyeongwon Line (Heigen Line): Seopo–Gowon, 1927–1945 (Seopo–Dongbungni to KSR Ryongsŏng Line, Dongbungni–Gowon to KSR P'yŏngwŏn Line)
- Pyeongyang Colliery Line (Heijō Tankō Line): Pyeongyang–Seunghori–Sinseongcheon, 1911–1945 (to KSR P'yŏngdŏk Line)
- Secheon Line (Seisen Line): Sinhakpo–Jungbong, 1929–1934, 1940–1945 to KSR Sech'ŏn Line)
- Seongpyeong Line (Jōhei Line): Tonggwan–Seongpyeong, 1929–1934, 1940–1945 (to KSR Sŏngp'yŏng Line)
- Dongpo Line (Tōho Line): Jongseon–Dongpo, 1929–1934, 1940–1945 (to KSR Tongp'o Line)
- Yangsi Line (Yōshi Line): Sinuiju–Yangsi–Namsi, 1940–1943 (to KSR Yangsi Line)
- Yongdeung Line (Ryōtō Line): Kujang–Yongdeung, 1934–1945 (to KSR Ryongam Line)
- Yonggang Line (Ryōkō Line): Jinjidong–Mayeong, <1937–1945 (to KSR Ryonggang Line)
- Yongmun Colliery Line (Ryōmon Tankō Line): Eoryong–Yongmun Colliery, 1941–1945 (to KSR Ryongmun Colliery Line)
- Yongsan Line (Yūsan Line): Yongsan–Seogang–Dangilli/Seogang–Gajwa, 1929–1945 (Yongsan–Seogang–Gajwa to KNR Yongsan Line, Seogang–Dangilli to KNR Dangilli Line)

=== Narrow gauge ===
- Baengmu Line (Hakumo Line) (762 mm): Baegam–Musan, 1934–1945 (to KSR Paengmu Line)
- Dohae Line (Tokai Line) (762 mm): Haeju–Doseong, 1944–1945 (to KSR Paech'ŏn Line)
- Gaecheon Line (Keisen Line) (762 mm): Sinanju–Gaecheon, 1933–1945 (to KSR Kaech'ŏn Line)
- Haseong Line (Kasei Line) (762 mm): Sinwon–Haseong, 1944–1945 (to KSR Hasong Line)
- Jangyeon Line (Chōen Line) (762 mm): Sariwon–Sugyo–Jangyeon, 1944–1945 (to KSR Changyŏn Line)
- Jeongdo Line (Teitō Line) (762 mm): East Haeju–Jeongdo, 1944–1945 (to KSR Chŏngdo Line)
- Naeto Line (Naito Line) (762 mm): Hwasan–Naeto, 1944–1945 (to KSR Naet'o Line)
- Ongjin Line (Ōshin Line) (762 mm): Haeju–Ongjin, 1944–1945 (to KSR Ongjin Line)
- Sahae Line (Sakai Line) (762 mm): Samgang–Hwasan–Sinwon–East Haeju, 1944–1945 (to KSR Sahae Line; Sinwon–East Haeju –> Hwanghae Ch'ŏngnyŏn Line) 1958)

== Private railways ==
A number of private railways existed during the period of the Japanese occupation of Korea; these were overseen by the Railway Bureau. Most were freight (served industrial plants, ports, natural resource transport sectors, as well as military transport) and a few for passenger service in Japanese-occupied Korea.

After the end of the Second World War, these were all nationalised, both in North and South Korea.

This is a (nearly) exhaustive list of private railways in Korea.

- Busan Port Railway
- Chosen Railway (1923–1945)
- Chosen Anthracite Company Railway (1943–1945)
- Chosen Coal Industry Railway (1938–1945)
- Chosen Central Railway (1919–1923; merged into Chosen Railway)
- Chosen Forestry Railway (merged into Chosen Railway)
- Chosen Gyeondong Railway (1930–1942; absorbed by Chosen Railway)
- Chosen Gyeongnam Railway (1912–1945)
- Chosen Gyeongpyeong Railway (1917–1919; absorbed by Chosen Central Railway)
- Chosen Industrial Railway (merged into Chosen Railway)
- Chosen Light Railway (1917–1919; renamed Chosen Central Railway)
- Chosen Magnesite Development Railway (1943–1945)
- Chosen Pyeongan Railway (1938–1945)
- Chosen Southern Railway (1920–1923; merged into Chosen Railway)
- Danpung Railway (1939–1945)
- Dasado Railway (1939–1945)
- Domun Railway (1920–1929; nationalised into Chosen Government Railway)
- East Manchuria Railway (Manchukuo, 1939–1945; abandoned after the war)
- Gaecheon Light Railway (1927–1933; nationalised into Chosen Government Railway)
- Geumgangsan Electric Railway (1924–1945)
- Gyeongbu Railway (1901–1906; nationalised to create the National Railway)
- Gyeongchun Railway (1939–1945)
- Gyeongin Railway (1899–1903; absorbed by Gyeongbu Railway)
- Hunchun Railway (Manchukuo, 1935–1939; became East Manchuria Railway)
- Jeonbuk Railway (1914–1927; nationalised into Chosen Government Railway)
- Jinsam Railway (1943–1945)
- Manchukuo National Railway (Manchukuo, 1932–1945; to China Railway; cross-border section abandoned 1945)
- Mitsubishi Ironworks Railway (1919–1920; became West Chosen Development Railway)
- Mitsui Mining Railway (1916–1927; became Gaecheon Light Railway)
- North Chosen Colonial Railway (1927–1944; nationalised into Chosen Government Railway)
- Pyeongbuk Railway (1939–1945)
- Samcheok Railway (1940–1945)
- Sinheung Railway (1923–1938; absorbed by Chosen Railway)
- South Manchuria Railway (1933–1945, post-Sentetsu independence; to China Railway)
- Temporary Military Railway (1904–1906; nationalised to create the National Railway)
- Tiantu Railway (Manchukuo, 1923–1933; nationalised by Manchukuo National Railway)
- West Chosen Central Railway (1939–1945)
- West Chosen Development Railway (1920–1923; merged into Chosen Railway)
- Yanggang Forest Development Railway (merged into Chosen Railway)
