= East Manchuria Railway =

Japanese company in colonial Korea

East Manchuria Railway Co. Ltd. 東満洲鐵道股份有限公司 東満洲鉄道株式会社 동만주 철도 주식회사
- Native name: 東満洲鐵道股份有限公司 東満洲鉄道株式会社 동만주 철도 주식회사
- Romanized name: Dōngmǎnzhōu Tiědào Gǔfèn Yǒuxiàn Gōngsī; Higashimanshū Tetsudō Kabushiki Kaisha; Dongmanju Cheoldo Jusikhoesa
- Company type: Joint-stock company
- Industry: Land transport
- Predecessor: Hunchun Railway Company
- Founded: 15 June 1938
- Defunct: August 1945
- Fate: Abolished
- Headquarters: Hunchun, Manchukuo
- Area served: eastern Manchukuo, northeastern Korea
- Key people: Agent: Naozaburō Nakamura (中村直三郎)
- Services: Passenger & freight railways, passenger busses
- Total equity: 10 million Manchukuo yuan
- Owner: East Manchuria Company (東満洲産業; 100% of 100,000 shares)

East Manchuria Railway

Overview
- Stations: 14

History
- Opened: 10 July 1935 (Hunchun Ry. n.g.); November 1939 (East Manchuria Ry. s.g.)
- Closed: 1945

Technical
- Line length: 73.1 km (45.4 mi)
- Number of tracks: Single track
- Track gauge: 1,435 mm (4 ft 8 1/2 in) standard gauge
- Old gauge: 762 mm (2 ft 6 in)

The East Manchuria Railway (Japanese: 東満洲鉄道, Higashimanshū Tetsudō; Chinese: 東満洲鐵道, Dōngmǎnzhōu Tiědào; Korean: 동만주 철도; RR: Dongmanju Cheoldo) was a railway company in Manchukuo headquartered in Hunchun, Jilin Province. Its mainline ran from Hunyung in Korea on the South Manchuria Railway's (Mantetsu) North Chosen East Line (now Hambuk Line) to Panshi on the Manchukuo National Railway's Fenghai Line via Hunchun. From the mainline there were branchlines to Gangouzi and to Dongmiaoling.

It was the only privately owned railway crossing the Tumen River between Korea and Manchukuo. It was damaged during the Pacific War, and after the end of the war it was closed down and dismantled.

== Description ==
From Hunyung on Mantetsu's North Chosen East Line the line headed north, crossing the Tumen River and entering Manchuria. It then turned east, following the river before reaching Hunchun, which was the main station on the line. From there, running via Luotuohezi and Maquanzi, it reached Panshi on Mantetsu's Fenghai Line. From Luotuohezi there was a branchline to Gangouzi, and at Maquanzi was the starting point of the branch to Dongmiaoling.

With part of the railway being inside Korean territory, the first 1.2 km (0.75 mi) from Hunyung to the midpoint of the Tumen River bridge fell under the jurisdiction of the Railway Bureau of the Government-General of Korea and Korean railway law; the rest of the line was within Manchukuo, and thus was under the jurisdiction of Manchukuo's Private Railways Act.

== History ==
=== Hunchun Railway ===
The original reasons behind the construction of the railway are unknown, as no relevant documents from the time have been located. However, it was located ideally to be a feeder railway to the South Manchuria Railway, and was in a good position to promote industrial development in eastern Manchuria, and would also benefit northeastern Korea.

In 1644 the Qing dynasty enacted an ordinance prohibiting settlement in the area around Hunchun, leaving the region an untouched wilderness for over 200 years until the ban was lifted in 1881. This made it ideal for settling, and both Manchukuo and Japan had high expectations for the development of the region. Spurred on by the positive outlook, the "Hunchun Railway" (琿春鉄路) was established in August 1932, with its headquarters at Hunchun, and a 762 mm (2 ft 6 in) narrow-gauge railway from Hunchun to Gyeongwon in Korea on the North Chosen East Line was planned. Later, the planned Korean terminus was moved to Hunyung, due to the bridge over the Tumen River located there that had been opened in 1926. However, though it was only a very short distance to be built inside Korea, it was nevertheless an international line, with the laws of both Korea and Manchukuo being applicable, which led to severe complications due to conflicting laws. As a result, it was decided to build the line initially entirely within Manchukuo, and on 10 July 1935 the line was opened from Hunchun to Yongwanzi on the Manchurian side of the river. Meanwhile, the issues on the Korean side were solved, and the remaining section across the border from Yongwanzi to Hunyung was opened on 1 November of the same year, but it wasn't until February 1936 that arrangements were made with Mantetsu to interchange passengers and cargo on the North Chosen East Line.

=== East Manchuria Railway ===
Despite being such a small railway, it was blessed with resources such as large coal mines along the line, and the Hunchun Railway went through a major boom, playing a much bigger role in the development of that section of northern Korea than had even been expected. The turning point came in 1938, in the midst of the Second Sino-Japanese War. Although Manchukuo was participating in the fighting alongside Japan, there were no battles within its own territory; nevertheless, it bordered the Soviet Union which, though perhaps not in technicality, was virtually an enemy state, which raised concerns in eastern Manchukuo. Not only was the Hunchun area near the Soviet border, it was likewise very close to Korea, and the Hunchun Railway took on an increasingly important role. As a result, the management of the Hunchun Railway Company set up an investment company in Japan in March 1938. This company was called the East Manchuria Company (東満洲産業, Higashimanshū Sangyō) and had its seat in Tokyo. On 15 June of that year, the East Manchuria Company formally acquired the Hunchun Railway, converting it into a wholly owned subsidiary called the East Manchuria Railway. The capital was increased from 120,000 Manchukuo yuan to 10 million yuan, and the number of shares was increased from 6,000 to 100,000.

After the acquisition, the first task at hand was to convert the existing narrow-gauge railway to standard gauge, to allow for direct interchange with Mantetsu and the Manchukuo National Railway. The work was completed all at once in November 1939, including replacement of the Tumen River bridge, which was too narrow to allow for the widening of the track. Due to the change in gauge, new motive power was needed, and locomotives were borrowed from the Manchukuo National Railway.

Plans were then made to expand the railway, envisioning a network of around 92 km (57 mi). In October 1940 the line was extended from Hunchun to Luotuohezi and on to Hadamen, and in the following month, another line was built from Luotuohezi to Dongmiaoling via Maquanzi. Further construction followed. A year later, in November 1941, the mainline was extended from Maquanli to Panshi, and the Hadamen branch was extended to Gangouzi; in October 1942, this was extended further to Laolongkou. Although further expansion was planned, Japan's defeat in the Pacific War prevented them from being realised.

=== Post-war ===
The fate of the railway after the end of the war remains a mystery; it is known only that it was closed after the defeat of Japan. On 9 August 1945 the Soviet Union declared war on Japan and invaded Manchuria and Korea. As this invasion was across the Tumen River, it is likely that the railway suffered severe damage at the time. Although the date of the closure is also unknown, in May 1946 the Soviet army handed Manchuria over to the Republic of China. As China was in a state of civil war at the time, it is likely that the railway was simply forgotten and abandoned, and never rebuilt, after barely a decade of operation.

== Services ==
In February 1938, at the end of the Hunchun Railway era, there were five daily round trips operated, consisting of locomotive-hauld second- and third-class passenger cars or by third-class powered railcars. The trip took approximately one hour for the passenger train, and 42 minutes for the railcar. The first train of the day from Hunchun left at 8:55 AM, whilst the first from Hunyung departed at 10:55. The last Hunchun departure was at 6:00 PM, the last train from Hunyung left at 8:02 PM.

After becoming the East Manchuria Railway and converting to standard gauge, by August 1940, only locomotive-hauled trains of second- and third-class cars were operated, with five return trips daily. These trains were much faster than those of the narrow-gauge period, needing only 30 minutes to make the trip between Hunyung and Hunchun. The day's first train from Hunchun left for Hunyung at 8:44 AM, with the return trip leaving Hunyung at 10:29 AM. The last train of the day left Hunchun at 6:55 PM, returning from Hunyung at 8:10 PM. The fare for a ticket bought in Manchukuo from Hunchun to Hunyung was 4 chiao 1 fen (0.41 Manchukuo yuan) for third class, and 7 chiao 3 fen for second class.

After the line was completed to Panshi in June 1942 the operation of trains made up of second- and third-class cars continued as before, but only one train went all the way between Panshi and Hunyung; on the other trips, a change of trains at Hunchun was necessary. Although there were five daily returns between Hunchun and Hunyung, there were only two daily round trips between Hunchun and Panshi. The first Hunchun-Hunyung train departed at 6:48 AM and returned at 8:12 AM, whilst the last train of the day left Hunchun at 8:48 PM, returning from Hunyung at 10:10 PM, the trips taking around 30 minutes. Trains from Hunchun to Panshi left at 9:33 AM and 4:59 PM, returning at 11:55 AM and 7:26 PM respectively; travel time was about 50 minutes. The fares at this time were 5 chiao 5 fen for a third-class ticket from Hunchun to Hunyung or 1 yuan 5 fen for a second-class ticket, and 1 yuan 6 chiao for a third-class ticket from Panshi to Hunyung, or 2 yuan 3 chiao for a second-class ticket.

In June 1942, two daily round trips were made between Hunyung and Gangouzi on the Panshi Branch Line via Hunchun, with locomotive-hauled trains consisting of second- and third-class cars. The trains left Hunyung at 8:12 AM and 1:37 PM, returning from Gangouzi at 10:27 AM and 3:41 PM respectively. Travel time to Gangouzi was 1 hour 30 minutes from Hunyung, and 47 minutes from Hunchun. The fare between Hunyung and Gangouzi was 1 yuan 6 chiao for a third-class ticket, and 3 yuan for a second-class ticket. At that time there were also two daily return trips between Hunchun and Dongmiaoling, also operated with locomotive-hauled trains consisting of second- and third-class cars. Trains left Hunchun at 9:16 AM and 4:40 PM, returning from Dongmiaoling at 11:35 AM and 7:04 PM respectively. Travel time was 54 minutes. A third-class ticket from Hunyung to Dongmiaoling was 1 yuan 5 chiao 5 fen, a second-class ticket for the same trip cost 2/6/5.

There were two coal mines located in Ying'an and one in Hunchun; these were important sources of freight traffic for the East Manchuria Railway.

== Rolling stock ==
Although no detailed information is known due to the dearth of surviving records, some information does exist in the form of photographs.

=== Narrow gauge ===
The Hunchun Railway, and the East Manchuria Railway in its early days, operated on 762 mm (2 ft 6 in) narrow-gauge track. Although no documents have been found, photographs show an 0-6-0T steam locomotive of about 10 tons, which in appearance looks to be an Orenstein & Koppel design. The number of such locomotives used is unknown.

=== Standard gauge ===
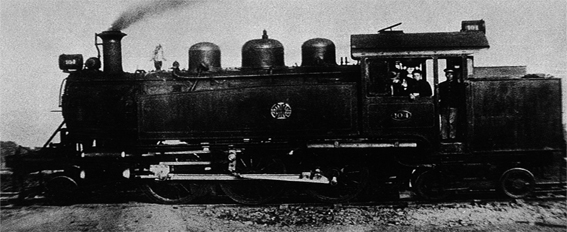
ダブコ501 as built for the Jihai Railway as number 801.

Although little is known about the East Manchuria Railway's standard gauge motive power, there is some information available on locomotives leased from the South Manchuria Railway.

- Dabuko class (ダブコ501-ダブコ505)

These 2-6-4T locomotives were originally built by Baldwin in 1927 for the Jihai Railway, numbered 801-805. After the Manchukuo National Railway took over the Shenhai Railway, they were reclassified and renumbered, becoming Dabuni class ダブニ5440 through ダブニ5444; later, they were reclassified and renumbered again, this time becoming Dabuko class ダブコ501 through ダブコ505, and subsequently were leased to the East Manchuria Railway.

== Situation after the closure ==
No trace of the line from Hunyung to the Tumen River remains, but the piers of the former bridge are still in place. Traces of the line are still in evidence on the Chinese side, and part of the right-of-way was used in the construction of the Changchun-Hunchun Intercity Line opened by the China Railway in 2015. Other parts of the right-of-way remain as unpaved roads outside the city of Hunchun.
