= Sentetsu Shiki class railcars =

3rd class steam railcars

Sentetsu Shiki class
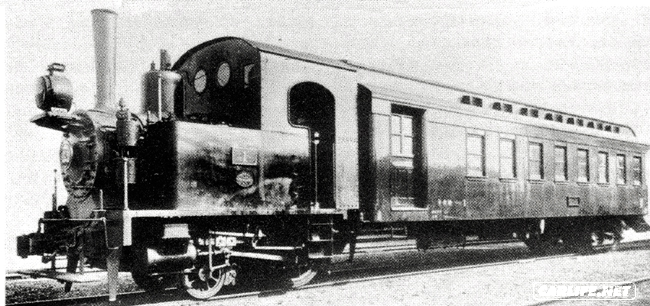
- Builder's photo of Shiki1 class steam railcar no. 1.
Type and origin
- Power type: Steam
- Builder: Shiki1: Kisha Seizō; Shiki2: Sentinel-Cammell
- Build date: Shiki1: 1923; Shiki2: 1929
- Total produced: Shiki1: 4 Shiki2: 2
Specifications
- Configuration
  - Whyte: Shiki1: 2-2-0T+2
- Gauge: 1,435 mm (4 ft 8 1/2 in)
- Driver dia.: Shiki1: 1,370 mm (54 in)
- Length: Shiki1: 6,936 mm (273.1 in) (power unit only)
- Width: Shiki1: 2,796 mm (110.1 in)
- Height: Shiki1: 4,281 mm (168.5 in)
- Adhesive weight: Shiki1: 16.90 t (16.63 long tons; 18.63 short tons)
- Loco weight: Shiki1: 28.50 t (28.05 long tons; 31.42 short tons)
- Fuel type: Coal
- Fuel capacity: Shiki1: 0.83 t (0.82 long tons; 0.91 short tons)
- Water cap.: Shiki1: 3.61 m^{3} (127 cu ft)
- Boiler
  - Small tubes: Shiki1: 258 x 38 mm (1.5 in)
- Boiler pressure: Shiki1: 13.0 kgf/cm^{2} (185 psi); Shiki2: 21.0 kgf/cm^{2} (299 psi)
- Heating surface
  - Firebox: Shiki1: 5.2 m^{2} (56 sq ft)
  - Tubes: 39.2 m^{2} (422 sq ft)
  - Total surface: Shiki1: 44.4 m^{2} (478 sq ft)
- Cylinder size: Shiki1: 250 mm × 406 mm (9.8 in × 16.0 in)
- Valve gear: Shiki1: Walschaerts
- Loco brake: Shiki1: Air brake
Performance figures
- Maximum speed: Shiki1: 75 km/h (47 mph)
- Tractive effort: Shiki1: 20.1 kN (4,500 lb_{f})
Career
- Operators: Chosen Government Railway
- Class: シキ1 (시그1); シキ2 (시그2)
- Number in class: Shiki1: 4 Shiki2: 2
- Numbers: Shiki1: シキ1-1–シキ1-4; Shiki2: シキ2-1–シキ2-2
- First run: Shiki1: 5 July 1923; Shiki2: 1929
- Withdrawn: Shiki1: 1924 (rebuilt)

The Shiki or Sigeu (Japanese シキ, Korean 시그) class railcars were a class of 3rd class steam railcars of the Chosen Government Railway (Sentetsu). There were two classes of such railcars, one built in Japan and one built in the United Kingdom.

== Shiki1 class (シキ1) ==
In 1923, Kisha Seizō of Japan built four steam railcars for Sentetsu, which were essentially a small tank steam locomotive with a 2-2-0 wheel arrangement built onto one end of a passenger carriage. Intended for use for commuter trains on the Gyeongin Line, the railcar pulled two passenger cars in active service. However, performance was far from satisfactory, with many complaints about excessive vibration being received. As a result, in 1924, after barely a year in service, one was scrapped, and the remaining three were converted to 2-2-0 tank locomotives by removing the integrated passenger compartment. A second one was scrapped in 1927, leaving only two locomotives. These two remained in service until at least 1940, but their subsequent fate is unknown.

== Shiki2 class (シキ2) ==
Despite the poor experience with the first steam railcars, Sentetsu imported two geared steam railcars from Sentinel-Cammell in England in 1929. These had a vertical boiler generating superheated steam of 21.0 kgf/cm^{2} (299 psi) pressure, which fed a single, horizontally mounted, 6-cylinder engine producing 30 hp (22 kW), and had a lightweight body integrated with the underframe. These steam railcars later proved very helpful in designing Sentetsu's first petrol-powered railcars. Both units remained in service until at least 1940, but their subsequent fate is unknown.
