= Munchon =

Munch'ŏn 문천시
- Municipal City

Korean transcription(s)
  - Chosŏn'gŭl: 문천시
  - Hancha: 文川市
  - McCune-Reischauer: Munch'ŏn si
  - Revised Romanization: Muncheon-si
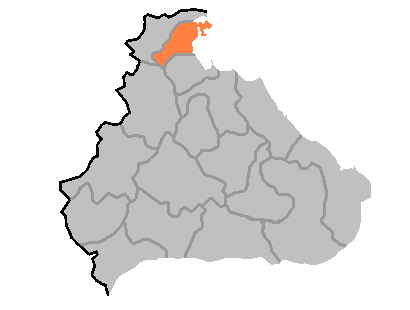
- Map of Kangwon showing the location of Munch'ŏn

- Location within North Korea
- Coordinates: 39.259°N 127.356°E
- Country: North Korea
- Province: Kangwon Province
- Administrative divisions: 16 tong, 14 ri

Population (2008)
  - Total: 122,934
- Time zone: UTC+9 (Pyongyang Time)
- Climate: Dwa

Munch'ŏn (Korean pronunciation: [mun.tsʰʌn]) is a North Korean city located in Kangwŏn Province. It lies on the coast of the Sea of Japan and borders Wonsan.

== History ==
During the era of Four Commanderies of Han, the region was known as the Xietoumei prefecture under Lintun Commandery. During the later Han period, it was part of the kingdom of Dongye and became part of Goguryeo in the 3rd century. The region was called Maeguru at the time of King Gwanggaeto the Great. Before 1413, the region was part of Hamgyong province, then known as Munju County, but due to the naming changes that follows the convention of changing regional names that end with ju to end with chon(川) or san(山), it became the county of Munchon. Manju was a sinicized name of the Korean name 'Mulgol (물골, water valley or town)' where the Korean word mul was substituted with mun which sounds similar to the Korean. In 1946, the region became part of Kangwon province. In 1972, after numerous subdivision changes, the county was abolished and incorporated into nearby counties. The county was once again restored in 1976 when some parts of it were incorporated into the city of Wonsan. In 1991, the county was promoted to a city. In the 2010s KPA Unit 291 base located in the city was planned to host large new warships and submarines. Constrution works continued in 2026.

== Geography ==
Munch'ŏn sits on Yŏnghŭng Bay, a bay of the Sea of Japan, on lowland seacoast terrain. The Masingryŏng Mountain Range is to the southwest. The Sokko Mountain Range and Ch'ŏllyŏng Mountain Range are also located here, and Kulttuk Peak is the highest mountain in the region. The main river is the Namch'ŏn River.

=== Climate ===
Munch'ŏn has a humid continental climate (Köppen climate classification: Dwa).

Climate data for Munch'ŏn
Month	Jan	Feb	Mar	Apr	May	Jun	Jul	Aug	Sep	Oct	Nov	Dec	Year
Mean daily maximum °C (°F)	1.3 (34.3)	2.4 (36.3)	7.6 (45.7)	15.9 (60.6)	20.9 (69.6)	24.3 (75.7)	27.2 (81.0)	27.9 (82.2)	24.0 (75.2)	18.9 (66.0)	10.4 (50.7)	3.1 (37.6)	15.3 (59.6)
Daily mean °C (°F)	−3.9 (25.0)	−2.4 (27.7)	2.8 (37.0)	10.1 (50.2)	15.3 (59.5)	19.6 (67.3)	23.3 (73.9)	23.8 (74.8)	19.0 (66.2)	13.2 (55.8)	5.6 (42.1)	−1.3 (29.7)	10.4 (50.8)
Mean daily minimum °C (°F)	−9.0 (15.8)	−7.2 (19.0)	−1.9 (28.6)	4.4 (39.9)	9.8 (49.6)	15.0 (59.0)	19.4 (66.9)	19.8 (67.6)	14.1 (57.4)	7.5 (45.5)	0.9 (33.6)	−5.7 (21.7)	5.6 (42.1)
Average precipitation mm (inches)	27 (1.1)	28 (1.1)	48 (1.9)	64 (2.5)	75 (3.0)	125 (4.9)	348 (13.7)	365 (14.4)	235 (9.3)	57 (2.2)	54 (2.1)	24 (0.9)	1,450 (57.1)
Source: Climate-Data.org

== Administrative divisions ==
Munch'ŏn is divided into 16 tong and 14 ri:

- Changbaek-tong
- Haean-dong
- Haebangsan-dong
- Hwangsŏk-tong
- Kangch'ŏl-dong
- Kap'yŏng-dong
- Koam-dong
- Kwanp'ung-dong
- Munch'ŏn-dong
- Munp'yŏng-dong
- Okp'yŏng-dong
- Pukhaeng-dong
- Sam'o-dong
- Sinan-dong
- Sŏngmun-dong
- Ŭnjŏng-dong
- Kaŭl-li
- Kyosŏng-ri
- Namch'ang-ri
- Pubang-ri
- Ryongjŏl-li
- Ryongt'al-li
- Samdong-ri
- Samhwa-ri
- Sam'il-li
- Sinsong-ri
- Sŏkchŏl-li
- Songjung-ri
- Tapch'ol-li
- Tŏkhŭng-ri

== Economy ==
=== Agriculture and fishery ===
Fishery, fruit, and livestock are the main industries of the region. Grain is the main agricultural product. The region is also known for its oysters.

=== Mining ===
Munch'ŏn has reserves of zinc, gold, silver, limestone, dolomite, granite and clay. Anthracite is also produced.

== Transportation ==
Munch'ŏn-si is served by the Kangwŏn Line of the Korean State Railway, with stations at Koam-dong, Okp'yŏng-dong and Munch'ŏn-dong.
