= Rolling stock of the Korean State Railway =

Locomotives used in North Korea

The Korean State Railway (Kukch'ŏl) operates a wide variety of electric, diesel and steam locomotives, along with a variety of electric multiple unit passenger trains. Kukch'ŏl's motive power has been obtained from various sources. Much, mostly steam and Japanese-made electric locomotives, was inherited from the Chosen Government Railway (commonly known as Sentetsu), the South Manchuria Railway (Mantetsu) and various privately owned railways of the colonial era. Many steam locomotives were supplied by various communist countries in the 1950s, including the Soviet Union, Czechoslovakia, Hungary, Poland, Romania, and China.

Most electric locomotives were made in North Korea by the Kim Chŏng-tae Electric Locomotive Works, as new construction of domestic designs or rebuilds of older units; however, many diesel locomotives have been converted to electric operation at the same factory. Apart from small diesel switchers and draisines, almost all diesel and steam locomotives were manufactured outside North Korea.

Due to ongoing economic difficulties in North Korea, maintenance levels are poor; locomotive serviceability is estimated at 50%. However, recently a major campaign to improve the operation and appearance of rolling stock and infrastructure, and a modernisation of the electric locomotive fleet has begun following an order issued by Kim Jong Un.

== Classification system ==
The Korean State Railway's classification system presently uses a two-character type designator and a class number.

Initially steam and electric locomotives used a modification of the system used by Sentetsu prior to war's end; however, instead of using Japanese numbers, this class number was based on Korean numbers, and the two-syllable type designations were converted from Japanese katakana to Chosŏn'gŭl. This was nearly identical to the post-war system used Korean National Railroad in South Korea, though the KNR used Roman numerals instead of Korean numbers, and slightly different Koreanisations of the Japanese type name.

Wheel Arrangement	English type name	Japanese name (Sentetsu)	Korean name (Kukch'ŏl)	Korean name (KNR)
4-6-4T	"Baltic"	バル; Baru	바루? Paru	발틱; Palt'ik
2-4-2T	"Columbia"	ゴロ; Goro	고로; Koro	--
2-8-0	"Consolidation"	ソリ; Sori	소리; Sori	소리; Sori
2-10-0	"Decapod"	デカ; Deka	데가; Tega	--
4-8-2	"Mountain"	マテ; Mate	마더; Madŏ	마터; Mat'ŏ
2-8-2	"Mikado"	ミカ; Mika	미가; Miga	미카; Mik'a
2-6-0	"Mogul"	モガ; Moga	모가; Moga	모가; Moga
4-6-2	"Pacific"	パシ; Pashi	바시; Pasi	파시; P'asi
2-6-2	"Prairie"	プレ; Pure	부러; Purŏ	푸러; P'urŏ
2-10-2	"Santa Fe"	サタ; Sata	사다; Sada	사타; Sat'a
2-2-0	"Single"	シグ; Shigu	시그; Sigŭ	시그; Sigŭ
4-6-0	"Ten-Wheeler"	テホ; Teho	더우; Tŏu	터우; T'ŏu

The numbers one through four were taken from traditional Korean numerals, the rest were from Sino-Korean numerals.

Number	Korean	Japanese
1	하 "ha", from 하나, "hana"	イ "i", from イチ, "ichi"
2	두 "du", from 둘, "dul"	ニ "ni", from ニ, "ni"
3	서 "sŏ", from 셋, "set"	サ "sa", from サン, "san"
4	너 "nŏ", from 넷, "net"	シ "shi", from シ, "shi"
5	오 "o", from 오, "o"	コ "ko", from ゴ, "go"
6	유 "yu", from 육, "yuk"	ロ "ro", from ロク, "roku"
7	치 "ch'i", from 칠, "ch'il"	ナ "na", from ナナ, "nana"
8	파 "p'a", from 팔, "p'al"	ハ "ha", from ハチ, "hachi"
9	구 "ku", from 구, "ku"	ク "ku", from ク, "ku"
10	시 "si", from 십, "sip"	チ "chi", from ヂウ, "jyu"

Thus, a Sentetsu ミカサ ("Mikasa") class steam locomotive became 미가서 ("Migasŏ") under the new system.

Sentetsu's system of classifying electric locomotives wasn't retained; instead, all electric locomotives were simply given the type designator 전기 (chŏngi, "electric"). Thus, the four classes of electric locomotive that were inherited thus became Chŏngiha, "Electric 1" (from 하나, hana, "one"); 전기두, Chŏngidu, "Electric 2" (from 둘, tul, "two"); 전기서, Chŏngisŏ, "Electric 3" (from 셋, set, "three"); and 전기너, Chŏnginŏ, "Electric 4" (from 넷, net, "four"). With the arrival of new electrics from Czechoslovakia in the late 1950s, this system was continued with the Chŏngi-5 series (전기5).

However, after the introduction of the Red Flag 1-class locomotives (which were given their name by Kim Il Sung), all subsequent electric locomotives received the 붉은기 (Pulg'ŭn'gi, "Red Flag") designation, followed by a three or four-digit serial number; this applies to all classes intended for mainline use, even if they have a different class name (e.g. the Ch'ŏngnyŏnjŏl Kinyŏm-class). The exception to this is the Kanghaenggun-class (강행군, "Forced March") locomotives, which are numbered 1.5-01 through 1.5-11. Electric shunting locomotives carry only a running number.

Electric locomotives for narrow gauge lines, aside from the pre-war Chŏnginŏ class, are marked with their class name or line they're used on, followed by a serial number, e.g. Charyŏk Kaengsaeng-3 or Sinhŭngsŏn-02.

Later, around the late 1960s or early 1970s, a system similar to that introduced for electric locomotives was applied to steam and diesel locomotives. Steam locomotives were universally given the type designator 증기 (Chŭnggi, "steam") and diesel locomotives 내연 (Naeyŏn, "internal combustion"), along with a three- (for mainline diesels) or four-digit (for shunting diesels and all steam engines) serial number, with diesel locomotives are numbered sequentially within their number series. On steam locomotives, the first of the new four-digit serial number reflects the former type designator (부러 → 1, 미가 → 6, 마더 → 7; the others are unknown, and the 8000 series is applied to steam locomotives of foreign origin supplied as war aid during the Korean War); the second digit reflects the former type-series, directly translating the number, e.g. 미가서 became 6300, 마더하 became 7100. The last two digits are the locomotive's original running number (last three digits, in the case of the Migaha class numbered into the 6000 and 6100 series). The system behind determining which numeral represents which type designator (that is, why Miga became "6", etc.) is unclear, as this numeral has no relation to anything obvious, e.g. number of powered axles, etc.

Electric multiple-unit trainsets appear to be classified like steam and diesel locomotives, using 전기 (Chŏngi, "electric") as the type designator, followed by a three or four digit serial number, continuing the pattern set by the early electric locomotives. However, the actual application of this to the rolling stock is inconsistent, and there are many which carry only a running number. The numbering of the petrol and diesel railcars inherited from Sentetsu is unknown.

== Standard-gauge electric locomotives ==
When Korea was partitioned following Japan's defeat in the Pacific War, it was the North who benefitted from Sentetsu's first electrification project. The first stretch of electrified track in Korea was the Pokkye-Kosan section of the former Kyŏngwŏn Line, electrification of which had been completed on 27 March 1944, and which after the partition was in the Northern half. Although electrification of the Chech'ŏn-P'unggi section of the Kyŏnggyŏng Line had been started in 1941, by the end of the war it was only 90% complete; this stretch was in the South after the partition.

By the end of the war, of the 26 electric locomotives that had been ordered by Sentetsu, only nine had been delivered; of these, eight were in operation on the electrified section of the Kyŏngwŏn Line, and one was in Seoul for repairs; when Sentetsu's rolling stock was officially divided in 1947, this split of electric locomotives was formalised as well.

Electrification work resumed after the end of the war, and in 1948, the electrification of two further stretches was completed: the mountainous section from Yangdŏk to Ch'ŏnsŏng on the P'yŏngra Line, and Kaegu to Koin on the Manp'o Line.

After the partition, the Allied General Headquarters (GHQ) in Tokyo ordered the delivery of a further ten electric locomotives to Korea as war reparations from Japan. Seven were eventually delivered, all to the South, based on the expectation that reunification would come quickly, and that the implementation of Sentetsu's electrification plans would continue. However, after the outbreak of the Korean War, during the occupation of much of the Korean Peninsula by the Korean People's Army seven of the eight electric locomotives were captured and taken to the north - the one unit that had been in Seoul for repairs at the time of Japan's surrender in the Pacific war, along with six of the seven units that had been delivered to the South from Japan after the partition. Thus, of the 16 electric locomotives that had been delivered from Japan, 15 ended up in the North after the end of the Korean War.

The Korean War left all of the electrification in Korea destroyed, and for several years the 15 electric locomotives in the North sat unused. The Korean State Railway had not abandoned its plans to electrify, however, and along with the general reconstruction of its severely damaged infrastructure, re-electrification of previously electrified lines and new electrification of other lines was begun, and in 1956, the electrification of the Yangdŏk-Ch'ŏnsŏng section of the P'yŏngra Line was restored. At the same time, the 15 Japanese-built electric locomotives were refurbished at the engine shops at Yangdŏk.

Electrification continued apace, and by 1964, 371.5 km (230.8 mi) of the P'yŏngra Line, along with the entirety of the P'yŏngŭi Line, had been electrified. As part of the modernisation of the country's railways and the ever-expanding electrification of the network, new electric locomotives were ordered from Czechoslovakia. Later, a licence was obtained from Czechoslovakia, along with technology transfer, to manufacture electric locomotives at the Kim Chŏng-tae Electric Locomotive Works in P'yŏngyang, and all of North Korea's electric locomotives have been manufactured domestically since then.

The production of the domestically designed and produced Red Flag 1-class locomotives began in 1961. Since the beginning of the 1980s, much of the production of "new" locomotives has involved the refurbishment and upgrade of previously built units, sometimes retaining the existing body, sometimes building new bodywork for the locomotive; such is the case some of the Pulgungi 5000-8/1 locomotives, which are built on older chassis, upgraded for higher performance, and enclosed in a newly built body.

=== Electric locomotive classes ===
Class (Type)	Number series	Top speed	Power output （kW）	Wheel arrangement	Number	Build year	Builder	Country of origin	Photo	Notes
전기오 (Chŏngi5) (Škoda Type 22E_{2})	전기50–전기59	120 km/h (75 mph)	2,030 kW (2,720 hp)	Bo-Bo	10	1956	Škoda Works	Czechoslovakia		Some modified and renumbered.
100 (Škoda Type 30E_{2})	100 series	120 km/h (75 mph)	2,032 kW (2,725 hp)	Bo-Bo	>14	1959–1960	Kim Chong-t'ae	North Korea		Built in DPRK under licence from Škoda.
150	150 series	80 km/h (50 mph)	471 kW (632 hp)	Bo-Bo	>2	?	Kim Chong-t'ae, rebuilder (Ganz-MÁVAG, builder)	North Korea (Hungary)		Rebuilt from Ganz-MÁVAG DVM-4 diesel locomotives in the 1990s.
170	170 series			Bo-Bo	>9	?	Kim Chong-t'ae	North Korea		Locally designed medium-heavy offset-centre cab shunters
200	200 series		330 kW (440 hp)	Bo-Bo	?	?	Kim Chong-t'ae	North Korea		Locally designed offset-centre cab shunters.
300	300 series			Bo-Bo	>85	?	Kim Chong-t'ae	North Korea		Small, locally designed centre-cab shunters.
500 (1)	500 series			Bo-Bo	?	?	Kim Chong-t'ae	North Korea		Boxy, locally designed light centre-cab shunters.
500 (2) (ТГМ3Б)	500 series	70 km/h (43 mph)	883 kW (1,184 hp)	Co-Co	?	?	Kim Chong-t'ae, rebuilder (Bryansk, builder)	Soviet Union		A small number of Soviet-built ТГМ3Б diesel locomotives converted to electrics in the 1990s.
전기하 (Chŏngiha)	전기하1–전기하9	75 km/h (47 mph)	2,310 kW (3,100 hp)	1C-C1	9	1943–1944	Toshiba	Japan		Formerly Sentetsu デロイ-class; at least one, 전기하3, still operational.
전기두 (Chŏngidu)	전기두1–전기두4	75 km/h (47 mph)	2,100 kW (2,800 hp)	1C-C1	4	1943–1944	Hitachi	Japan		Formerly Sentetsu デロニ-class; all likely retired.
전기서 (Chŏngisŏ)	전기서1–전기서3	75 km/h (47 mph)	2,250 kW (3,020 hp)	1C-C1	3	1946	Mitsubishi	Japan		Built as Sentetsu デロイ-class but delivered new in 1946 to KNR as 데로3-class; captured during Korean War and taken north. All likely retired.
전기너 (Chongino)	전기너 201–?			Bo-Bo						Prewar narrow gauge locomotive, one museum vehicle 전기너 201, as Kim Il Sung had visited it.
강행군 (Kanghaenggun)	1.5-01–15.21 (K62 rebuilds); 300 series (Kŭmsong rebuilds)	100 km/h (62 mph)	1,470 kW (1,970 hp)	Co-Co	>23	1998–?	Kim Chong-t'ae, rebuilder (Voroshilovgrad, builder)	North Korea (Soviet Union)		Rebuilt from K62 and Kŭmsŏng-class diesel locomotives from 1998.
선군붉은기 (Sŏngun Red Flag)	0001–0002, 4071–	120 km/h (75 mph)	4,200 kW (5,600 hp)	Bo-Bo	>3	2011–	Kim Chong-t'ae	North Korea		Locally designed mainline locomotives with asynchronous motors.
새별1000 (Saebyŏl 1000)	1000 series			Bo-Bo	>79	2011–	Kim Chong-t'ae	North Korea		Locally designed centre-cab shunters for use at large stations.
새별3000 (Saebyŏl 3000)	3000 series			Bo-Bo	?	1990s	Kim Chong-t'ae	North Korea		Locally designed medium shunters converted for electric operation in the 1990s.
붉은기2000Pulgungi "Marshalling locomotive"	2000 series	120 km/h (75 mph)	2,120 kW (2,840 hp)	Bo-Bo	≥43	1968	Kim Chong-t'ae	North Korea		Locally designed marshalling electric locomotive.
붉은기 "청년절기념 (Ch'ŏngnyŏnjŏl Kinyŏm)"	붉은기4001–붉은기4056 붉은기90001–붉은기90007			Bo-Bo	≥63	1990s?	Kim Chong-t'ae	North Korea		Locally designed electric locomotives based on French CSE26-21 design.
붉은기1 (Red Flag 1)	5001–5196	120 km/h (75 mph)		Co-Co	>150	1961–?	Kim Chong-t'ae	North Korea		First locally designed locomotive.
붉은기2 (Red Flag 2) 만경대호 (Man'gyŏngdae)	5201–5387	120 km/h (75 mph)	3,180 kW (4,260 hp)	Co-Co	>150	1980–?	Kim Chong-t'ae	North Korea		Derivative of Red Flag 1; Man'gyŏngdae class geared for higher speeds for express passenger trains.
Red Flag 5000-8/1	5397–5440	120 km/h (75 mph)	4,326 hp (3,226 kW)	Bo-Bo-Bo	≥43	1990s	Kim Chong-t'ae	North Korea		Locally designed electric locomotives based on French CSE26-21 design.
붉은기6 (Red Flag 6)	6001–6029+	120 km/h (75 mph)	4,240 kW (5,690 hp)	Bo'Bo'+Bo'Bo'	≥29	1985–?	Kim Chong-t'ae	North Korea		Articulated derivative of four axle Red Flag locomotives.
붉은기7 (Red Flag 7)	7001–7004	120 km/h (75 mph)	5,418 kW (7,266 hp)	Bo'Bo'+Bo'Bo'	≥4	1990s	Kim Chong-t'ae	North Korea		Articulated derivative of Chongnyonjolkimyom class. Also called Red Flag 2.16 class.
랑림 (Rangnim)	01-02			Bo-Bo	≥2		Kim Chong-t'ae	North Korea		Narrow gauge locomotives
						2020	Kim Chong-t'ae	North Korea		New 6-axle alternating current locomotive, first seen in industrial design exhibitions in 2016.
자력갱생 (Self-regeneration)			551 kW (739 hp)	Bo-Bo			Kim Chong-t'ae	North Korea		Narrow gauge (762 mm) locomotives used on the Soho Line. 8 locomotives were later rebuilt with a more modern design. Also registered as 신흥산 (Sinhungsan).

== Diesel locomotives ==
Due to North Korea's extensive coal deposits and hydroelectric power generation facilities, dieselisation hasn't been a priority for the Korean State Railway as it has been for many other railways. With ample coal supplies to fire steam locomotives, and electrification of the rail network being expanded rapidly after the Korean War, serious dieselisation didn't start until the 1960s, first with the arrival of 14 shunting locomotives from Hungary, followed by the first batch of the K62-class mainline diesels (the variant of the M62-type common throughout the former Communist bloc) from the Soviet Union in 1967. Though the Hungarian shunters are mostly gone, apart from a few that have been converted to electric operation, the K62s form the backbone of Kukch'ŏl's diesel fleet to this day.

Severe floods in the 1990s had taken their toll on North Korea's hydroelectric generation system, and even some mines had flooded - and due to electricity shortages caused by the silting of the dams, there was often little electricity available to run pumps needed to clear the water out of the mines. By the turn of the millennium, Kukch'ŏl was having difficulties keeping electric trains running, and the fleet of K62s was insufficient to meet the transportation needs, even though they'd dropped significantly due to ongoing economic difficulties. To alleviate this problem, more M62s from several European countries, along with a sizeable number of second-hand locomotives from China, were imported.

In recent years, extensive work has begun on refurbishing the rail network and power generation capabilities in the country, but diesels continue to play their significant role in hauling passenger and freight trains on the various mainlines.

=== Diesel locomotive classes ===
Class (Type)	Number series	Top speed	Power output （kW）	Wheel arrangement	Number	Build year	Builder	Country of origin	Photo	Notes
내연100 (DF5)	내연101–내연108	80 km/h (50 mph)	1,213 kW (1,627 hp)	Co-Co	8	1984	Sifang	China		Bought second-hand in the 2000s.
내연150 (DVM-4)	내연150–내연164	80 km/h (50 mph)	471 kW (632 hp)	Bo-Bo	14	1964	Ganz-MÁVAG	Hungary		First diesel locomotives in DPRK. Some converted to electrics.
내연200 (DF4B, DF4C, DF4D)	내연201–내연225 내연261–내연271	100 km/h (62 mph)	2,650 kW (3,550 hp)	Co-Co	>38	1984-?	Dalian, Sifang, Datong, Ziyang	China		Two bought new in 2001 (DF4D), at least 36 (mostly DF4B) bought second-hand in 2006–2008.
내연300 (BJ)	내연301–내연333	120 km/h (75 mph)	1,990 kW (2,670 hp)	B-B	>33	1970–1991	Beijing	China		Bought second-hand in 2002.
내연400 (T448.0)	내연401–내연411	70 km/h (43 mph)	883 kW (1,184 hp)	Bo-Bo	11	1977–1989	ČKD	Czechoslovakia		Former Polish, Slovak, and Czech locomotives bought second-hand in 2004–2005.
내연500 (ТЭМ1/2, ТГМ3Б/4/4Б/8Э)	내연5xx	70 km/h (43 mph)	883 kW (1,184 hp)	Co-Co	?	various	Bryansk	Soviet Union		Various Soviet-built locomotives (ТЭМ1/2, ТГМ3Б/4/4Б/8Э types) bought new and second-hand from 1972 to the 1990s; some converted to electric; some broad gauge.
내연600 (M62)	내연601–내연665	100 km/h (62 mph)	1,472 kW (1,974 hp)	Co-Co	65	1967–1974	Voroshilovgrad	Soviet Union		Soviet-built M62 type locomotives bought new. Some converted to electrics as Kanghaenggun class.
내연700 (M62)	내연701–내연744	100 km/h (62 mph)	1,472 kW (1,974 hp)	Co-Co	44	1965–	Voroshilovgrad	Soviet Union		Soviet-built M62 type locomotives bought second-hand from Germany and Poland between 1997 and 2000.
내연800 (M62/ДМ62)	내연855–내연873+	100 km/h (62 mph)	1,472 kW (1,974 hp)	Co-Co	>30	1965–	Voroshilovgrad	Soviet Union		Soviet-built M62 type locomotives bought second-hand from Poland, Slovakia and Russia between 1997 and 2000.
내연900 (DFH3)	내연901–내연930	120 km/h (75 mph)	1,460 kW (1,960 hp)	B-B	30	1976–1987	Qishuyan, Sifang, Ziyang	China		Bought second-hand in 2000–2002.
새별 (Saebyŏl)	새별3001–새별3227		249 kW (334 hp)	Bo-Bo	≥227	1990s	Kim Chong-t'ae	North Korea		Locally designed medium shunters; some converted for electric operation in the 1990s.
금성 (Kŭmsŏng)	금성8001–금성8002+		1,472 kW (1,974 hp)	Co-Co	≥2	1970s	Kim Chong-t'ae	North Korea		Unlicensed copies of the K62-class locomotive. Some converted to electrics as Kanghaenggun class.
붉은기 (Red Flag)				B-B		1965	Kim Chong-t'ae	North Korea		Small locally-built shunters similar to JNR Class DD13 (国鉄DD13形ディーゼル機関車)
CSE26-21		110 km/h (68 mph)	2,650 kW (3,550 hp)	Co-Co	12	1981–1985	GIE Francorail-MTE	France		Mainline locomotives bought new from France. DPRK numbers/class unknown.
China Railways DF8B		100 km/h (62 mph)	3,680 kW (4,930 hp)	Co-Co	2	2008	CRRC Ziyang	China		numbers/class unknown, originally bought to haul presidential carriges for Kim Jong Il.
대홍단 (Taehongdan)				B-B						Small narrow gauge locomotives.
unknown			230 hp (170 kW)	B-B	≥1	1985	Pyongyang Cornstarch Mill	North Korea		Diesel shunter.

== Electric multiple units ==
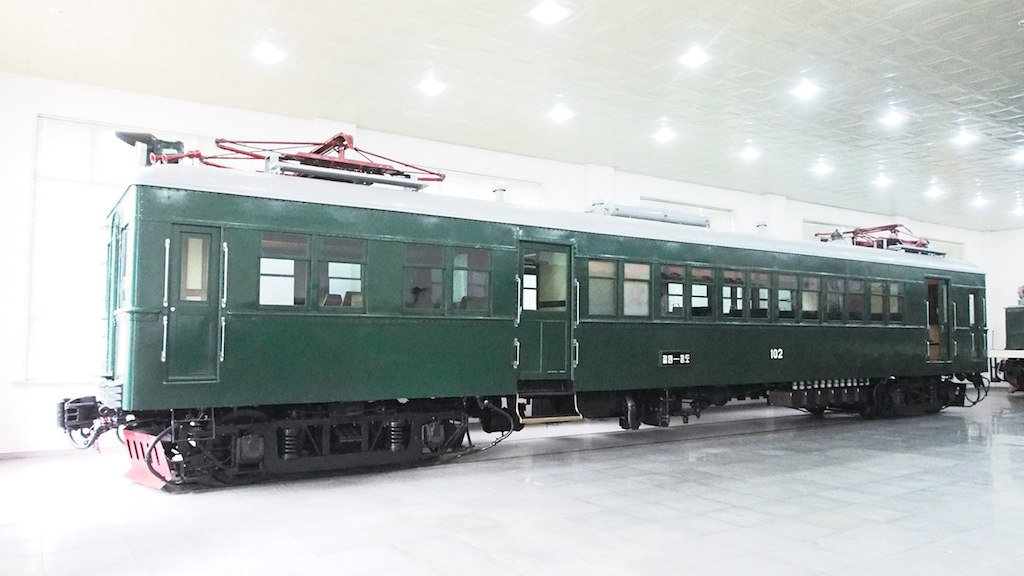
100-series electric railcar at the P'yŏngyang Railway Museum.

- 100-series - Five DeRoHaNi-class combination 2nd and 3rd class electric railcars with baggage compartment originally built by Nippon Sharyō for the colonial-era Kŭmgangsan Electric Railway. One of these, number 102, is preserved at the P'yŏngyang Railway Museum.
- 500-series - Former P'yŏngyang Metro trainsets, second-hand Type GI sets from Berlin, converted for operation as mainline EMUs by the Kim Chong-t'ae Works in 2001.
- 1000-series - Former P'yŏngyang Metro DK4 trainsets, built new for Pyongyang Metro by the Changchun Car Company of China in 1972, subsequently converted for operation as mainline EMUs by the Kim Chong-t'ae Works between 1995 and 2007.
- Juche - 4-section low-speed EMU built by Kim Chong-t'ae Works in 1976. At least two sets built, later it became 6 section after two cars were taken from the unknown EMU. These cars had their sliding doors replaced by swing doors, though their original purpose is given away by the door position, which unlike the original Juche cars, are not located at the end of each carriage.
- Red Flag 900-class - A unique combination electric locomotive with a section for carrying passengers built by the Kim Chong-t'ae Works.
- Unknown 6-car EMU with two pantographs and outside hanging sliding doors.

== Railcars ==
29 Keha-class petrol railcars were inherited from Sentetsu after the war. Very little is known about their service lives with Kukch'ŏl or their classification and numbering, but one was seen in service on the Pukpu Line in 2012.

There are also an unknown number of Qinling GC-160 and 'Sonbul' (선불) railbuses. The Sonbul originally ran a school service near Manpo, until the line was electrified. Currently, the school service is pulled by a BVG Class G.

== Steam locomotives ==
Class (Type)	Number series	Top speed	Power output （kW）	Wheel arrangement	Number	Build year	Builder	Country of origin	Photo	Notes
데가하 (Degaha)	데가하1–데가하12+→8101–8112+	70 km/h (43 mph)	1,442 kW (1,934 hp)	2-10-0	>12	1915–1918; 1943–1947	Baldwin, ALCo, CLC	USA, Canada		Received second-hand as aid from the USSR.
고로하 (Koroha)	고로하1–고로하3 → ?	75 km/h (47 mph)		2-4-2T	3	1924	Kisha Seizō	Japan		Formerly Sentetsu Goroi-class.
마더하 (Madŏha)	마더하x → 7100 series	80 km/h (50 mph)		4-8-2	≈11	1939–1945	Kisha Seizō, Gyeongseong	Japan, Korea		Formerly Sentetsu Matei-class.
마더두 (Madŏdu)	마더두x → 7200 series	80 km/h (50 mph)		4-8-2	?	1939–1945	Kawasaki	Japan		Formerly Sentetsu Mateni-class.
미가하 (Migaha) (ex-Mantetsu)	미가하x → 6000/6100 series	80 km/h (50 mph)		2-8-2	see article	1939–1945	various	USA, Japan, Manchukuo		Formerly Mantetsu Mikai-class. Some operational in the 21st century.
미가하 (Migaha) (ex-Sentetsu)	미가하6 → 6006 + two	70 km/h (43 mph)		2-8-2	3	1939–1945	Baldwin	USA		Formerly Sentetsu Mikai-class.
미가두 (Migaha)	미가두x → 6200 series	70 km/h (43 mph)		2-8-2	see article	1919	ALCo	USA		Formerly Sentetsu Mikani-class.
미가서 (Migasŏ)	미가서x → 6300 series	70 km/h (43 mph)		2-8-2	see article	1927–1945	various	Japan, Korea		Formerly Sentetsu Mikasa-class. Some operational in the 21st century.
미가너 (Miganŏ)	미가너x → 6400 series	70 km/h (43 mph)		2-8-2	see article	1939–1942	Kawasaki	Japan		Formerly Sentetsu Mikashi-class. Some operational in the 21st century.
미가유 (Migayu)	미가유x → 6600 series	80 km/h (50 mph)	938 kW (1,258 hp)	2-8-2	see article	1934–1945	various	Japan, Manchukuo		Formerly Mantetsu Mikaro-class. Some operational in the 21st century.
모가하 (Mogaha)	모가하x	55 km/h (34 mph)		2-6-0T	1	1899	Brooks	USA		Formerly Sentetsu Mogai-class.
바루하 (Baruha)	바루하x	75 km/h (47 mph)		4-6-4T	9	1913−1914	Baldwin	USA		Formerly Sentetsu Barui-class.
바시하 (Pasiha)	바시하x	95 km/h (59 mph)		4-6-2	see article	1921, 1923	Baldwin, Kisha Seizō	USA, Japan		Formerly Sentetsu Pashii-class.
바시두 (Pasidu)	바시두1−바시두6	95 km/h (59 mph)		4-6-2	6	1923	ALCo	USA		Formerly Sentetsu Pashini-class. 바시두3 is preserved at the Wŏnsan Revolutionary Museum with original Sentetsu lettering (パシニ3)
바시서 (Pasisŏ) (ex-Sentetsu)	바시서x	95 km/h (59 mph)		4-6-2	3	1923	Kawasaki	Japan		Formerly Sentetsu Pashisa-class.
바시서 (Pasisŏ) (ex-Mantetsu)	바시서1−바시서16	95 km/h (59 mph)		4-6-2	16	1934–1940	Hitachi, Kisha Seizō	Japan		Formerly Mantetsu Pashisa-class.
바시너 (Pasinŏ)	바시너x	95 km/h (59 mph)		4-6-2	see article	1927–1943	Kawasaki, Nippon Sharyō	Japan		Formerly Sentetsu Pashishi-class.
바시오 (Pasiu)	바시오x	110 km/h (68 mph)		4-6-2	see article	1940–1944	Kawasaki	Japan		Formerly Sentetsu Pashiko-class.
바시유 (Pasiyu)	바시유x	95 km/h (59 mph)		4-6-2		1933–1945	various	Japan, Manchukuo		Formerly Mantetsu Pashiro-class.
부러하 (Purŏha)	부러하x → 1100 series	75 km/h (47 mph)		2-6-2T	see article	1901, 1906	Baldwin	USA		Formerly Sentetsu Purei-class.
부러두 (Purŏdu)	부러두x → 1200 series	75 km/h (47 mph)		2-6-2T	see article	1905	Brooks	USA		Formerly Sentetsu Pureni-class.
부러서 (Purŏsŏ) (ex-Sentetsu)	부러서x → 1300 series	75 km/h (47 mph)		2-6-2T	see article	1911–1912	Borsig	Germany		Formerly Sentetsu Puresa-class.
부러서 (Purŏsŏ) (ex-Mantetsu)	부러서x → 1300 series	75 km/h (47 mph)		2-6-2T	see article	1930–1941	various	Japan		Formerly Mantetsu Puresa-class. Identical to Kukch'ŏl 부러치 (Purŏch'i) class. At least two operational in the 21st century.
부러너 (Purŏnŏ)	부러너x → 1400 series	75 km/h (47 mph)		2-6-2T	see article	1925–?	Gyeongseong, rebuilder (Baldwin, builder)	Korea; USA		Formerly Sentetsu Pureshi-class.
부러오 (Purŏo)	부러오1–부러오2 → 1501–1502	75 km/h (47 mph)		2-6-2T	see article	1911	Baldwin	USA		Formerly Sentetsu Pureko-class.
부러유 (Purŏyu)	부러유1–부러유2 → 1601–1602	75 km/h (47 mph)		2-6-2T	2	1911	Orenstein & Koppel	Germany		Formerly Sentetsu Purero-class.
부러치 (Purŏch'i)	부러치x → 1700 series	75 km/h (47 mph)		2-6-2T	see article	1930–1941	various	Korea, Japan		Formerly Sentetsu Purena-class. At least one operational in the 1990s.
부러파 (Purŏp'a)	부러파x → 1800 series	90 km/h (56 mph)		2-6-2T	see article	1932–1939	Gyeongseong, Hitachi, Kisha Seizō	Korea, Japan		Formerly Sentetsu Pureha-class.
사다하 (Sadaha)	사다하x	75 km/h (47 mph)		2-10-2T	see article	1934–1939	Gyeongseong, Hitachi	Korea, Japan		Formerly Sentetsu Satai-class.
시그하 (Sigŭha)	시그하1–시그하2	75 km/h (47 mph)		2-2-0T	2	1923	Kisha Seizō	Japan		Formerly Sentetsu Shigui-class, originally built as steam railcars.
소리유 (Soriyu)	소리유x			2-8-0		see article	various	see article		
더우하 (Tŏuha)	더우하x	95 km/h (59 mph)		4-6-0	see article	1906	Baldwin	USA		Formerly Sentetsu Tehoi-class.
더우두 (Tŏudu)	더우두x	95 km/h (59 mph)		4-6-0	see article	1906–1909	Baldwin, Brooks	USA		Formerly Sentetsu Tehoni-class.
더우서 (Tŏusŏ)	더우서x	95 km/h (59 mph)		4-6-0	see article	1911	ALCo	USA		Formerly Sentetsu Tehosa-class.
더우너 (Tŏunŏ)	더우너1–더우너4	95 km/h (59 mph)		4-6-0	4	1913	ALCo	USA		Formerly Sentetsu Tehoshi-class.
더우오 (Tŏuo)	더우오x	95 km/h (59 mph)		4-6-0	see article	1917–1919	ALCo, Shahekou	USA, Manchuria		Formerly Sentetsu Tehoko-class.
더우유 (Tŏuyu)	더우유x	95 km/h (59 mph)		4-6-0	see article	1927–1942	various	Japan, Korea		Formerly Sentetsu Tehoro-class.
100 (GJ)	101–107	35 km/h (22 mph)		0-6-0T	7	1959	Chengdu	China		China Railway class GJ supplied new to DPRK.
150	?	80 km/h (50 mph)		2-10-0	?	?	Malaxa	Romania		Romanian-made copies of the DRB Class 50 supplied new to DPRK in the mid-1950s.
424	424,001–424,020	90 km/h (56 mph)	1350 HP / 993 kW	4-8-0	20	1924–1958	MÁVAG	Hungary		MÁV class 424 supplied second-hand to DPRK during the Korean War; kept MÁV numbers.
475 (Lokomotiva 475.1)	475.1148–475.1172	100 km/h (62 mph)		4-8-2	25	1947-1950	Škoda	Czechoslovakia		ČSD class 475.1 supplied new to DPRK during the Korean War; kept ČSD numbers.
4110				0-10-0T	5	1914	Kawasaki	Japan		JGR Class 4110 converted to standard gauge and sent to private railways in Korea in 1939.
8000 (USATC S160)	8000 series	75 km/h (47 mph)		2-8-0	?	1942–1946	various	USA		Delivered third-hand between 1945 and 1953 from China and the Soviet Union.
기관차 (810)	500-507	40 km/h (25 mph)		2-8-0	8	1935-1936	Kisha Seizō	Japan		Formerly Chōsen Railway Class 810.
8500 (FD)	8500 series	85 km/h (53 mph)		2-10-2	?	1931–1942	Voroshilovgrad	Soviet Union		Delivered third-hand between from China.
(Ol49)	Ol49-113–Ol49-116	100 km/h (62 mph)	949 kW (1,273 hp)	2-6-2	4	1952	Fablok	Poland		Delivered new from Poland in 1952.
(TKt48) (TKt48)	Ol49-x	80 km/h (50 mph)	785 kW (1,053 hp)	2-8-2T	?	1950s	Fablok	Poland		Delivered new from Poland in the 1950s.
