= Sentetsu Pure class locomotives =

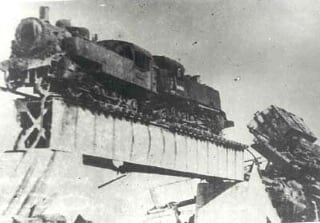
- Two Pure-type locomotives in North Korea during the Korean War - a Pureha (front) and a Purena (rear)
Specifications
- Configuration
  - Whyte: 2-6-2T
- Gauge: 1,435 mm (4 ft 8 1/2 in)

The Pure or Pureo (Japanese プレ, Korean 푸러) class locomotives were a group of steam tank locomotives with 2-6-2 wheel arrangement of various types used by the Chosen Government Railway (Sentetsu) in Korea. The "Pure" name came from the American naming system for steam locomotives, under which locomotives with 2-6-2 wheel arrangement were called "Prairie".

The first Pure type locomotives to arrive in Korea were a group of 18 locomotives imported by the Gyeongbu Railway from the Baldwin Locomotive Works of the United States for use on their Gyeongseong–Busan line. Eight classes of Pure type locomotives were subsequently introduced by Sentetsu, eventually becoming one of the most representative types of locomotive of the early era of Korean railways, used on all lines. All Pure type locomotives used in Korea were tank locomotives; there were no 2-6-2 locomotives with tenders used anywhere in Korea. All but the Pureha class (プレハ, Pure-8) had a driver diameter of 1,370 mm (54 in) and a maximum speed of 75 km/h (47 mph). In addition to Sentetsu, Pure type locomotives of various classes were used by a number of private railways in Korea, including the Gyeongchun Railway and the Chosen Gyeongnam Railway. As the Teho and Pashi type locomotives were introduced, the Pure classes were downgraded to use on branchlines and local trains.

In total, eight classes of Pure-type locomotives were operated by Sentetsu:

- Purei
- Pureni
- Puresa
- Pureshi
- Pureko
- Purero
- Purena
- Pureha

After Liberation, of the 279 surviving locomotives of all Pure classes (including the 52 owned by various private railways), 169 went to the Korean National Railroad in South Korea, and 110 to the Korean State Railway in North Korea.
