= Sentetsu Tehoshi-class locomotive =

4-6-0 steam locomotive

Chosen Government Railway Tehoshi class (テホシ) Korean State Railway Tŏunŏ class (더우너)
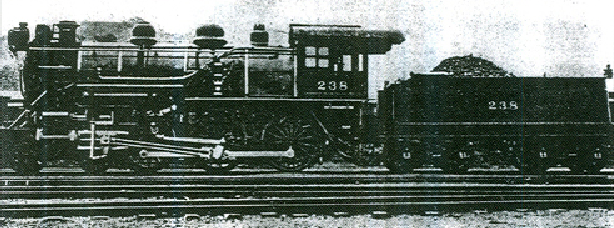
- Tehoshi-class locomotive number 238 as built in 1913.
Type and origin
- Power type: Steam
- Builder: ALCo
- Build date: 1913
- Total produced: 4
Specifications
- Configuration
  - Whyte: 4-6-0
- Gauge: 1,435 mm (4 ft 8 1/2 in)
- Driver dia.: 1,680 mm (66 in)
- Length: 18,625 mm (61 ft 1.3 in)
- Width: 2,972 mm (9 ft 9.0 in)
- Height: 4,232 mm (13 ft 10.6 in)
- Loco weight: 68.40 t (67.32 long tons)
- Tender weight: 43.03 t (42.35 long tons)
- Fuel capacity: 6.00 t (5.91 long tons)
- Water cap.: 15,100 L (4,000 US gal)
- Firebox
  - Grate area: 3.72 m^{2} (40.0 sq ft)
- Boiler
  - Small tubes: 264 x 57 mm (2.2 in)
- Boiler pressure: 12.6 kgf/cm^{2} (179 psi)
- Heating surface
  - Firebox: 12.00 m^{2} (129.2 sq ft)
  - Tubes: 156.50 m^{2} (1,684.6 sq ft)
  - Total surface: 174.80 m^{2} (1,881.5 sq ft)
- Cylinders: 1
- Cylinder size: 510 mm × 660 mm (20 in × 26 in)
- Valve gear: Walschaerts
Performance figures
- Maximum speed: 95 km/h (59 mph)
- Tractive effort: 111.0 kN (25,000 lb_{f})
Career
- Operators: Chosen Government Railway; Korean State Railway
- Class: Sentetsu: テホシ; KSR: 더우너
- Number in class: 4
- Numbers: Sentetsu: テホシ1–テホシ4; KSR: 더우너1–더우너4
- Delivered: 1913

The Tehoshi-class (テホシ) locomotives were a class of steam tender locomotives of the Chosen Government Railway (Sentetsu) with 4-6-0 wheel arrangement. The "Teho" name came from the American naming system for steam locomotives, under which locomotives with 4-6-0 wheel arrangement were called "Ten Wheeler".

After the Liberation of Korea, of the 178 surviving locomotives of all Teho classes - including six previously owned by private railway companies - 106 went to the Korean National Railroad in the South, and 72 to the Korean State Railway in the North.

== Description ==
Following the brief excursion to ALCo for the Tehosa class, Sentetsu once again returned to Baldwin for the next order of 4-6-0s. This was a small lot of four locomotives built in 1913, initially numbered 235–238 and intended for local freight trains, and had a lower profile than the previous Baldwin designs. They were renumbered 661–664 in 1918, finally being designated テホシ (Tehoshi) class in the 1938 general renumbering, numbered テホシ1 through テホシ4.

== Postwar ==
=== Korean State Railway 더우너 (Tŏunŏ) class ===
All four locomotives of the class went to the North after the partition, where they were designated 더우너 (Tŏunŏ) class by the Korean State Railway and numbered 더우너1 through 더우너4, but little is known of their service lives and subsequent fates.

== Construction ==
Sentetsu running number			Postwar				
1914–1918	1918–1938	1938–1945	Owner	Number	Builder	Year	Notes
235	テホ661	テホシ1	KSR	더우너1	ALCo	1913	
236	テホ662	テホシ2	KSR	더우너2	ALCo	1913	
237	テホ663	テホシ3	KSR	더우너3	ALCo	1913	
238	テホ664	テホシ4	KSR	더우너4	ALCo	1913	
Total							4
