= Sentetsu Pureha-class locomotives =

2-6-2 steam locomotive

Chosen Government Railway Pureha class (プレハ) Korean National Railroad Pureo8 class (푸러8) Korean State Railway Purŏp'a class (부러파)
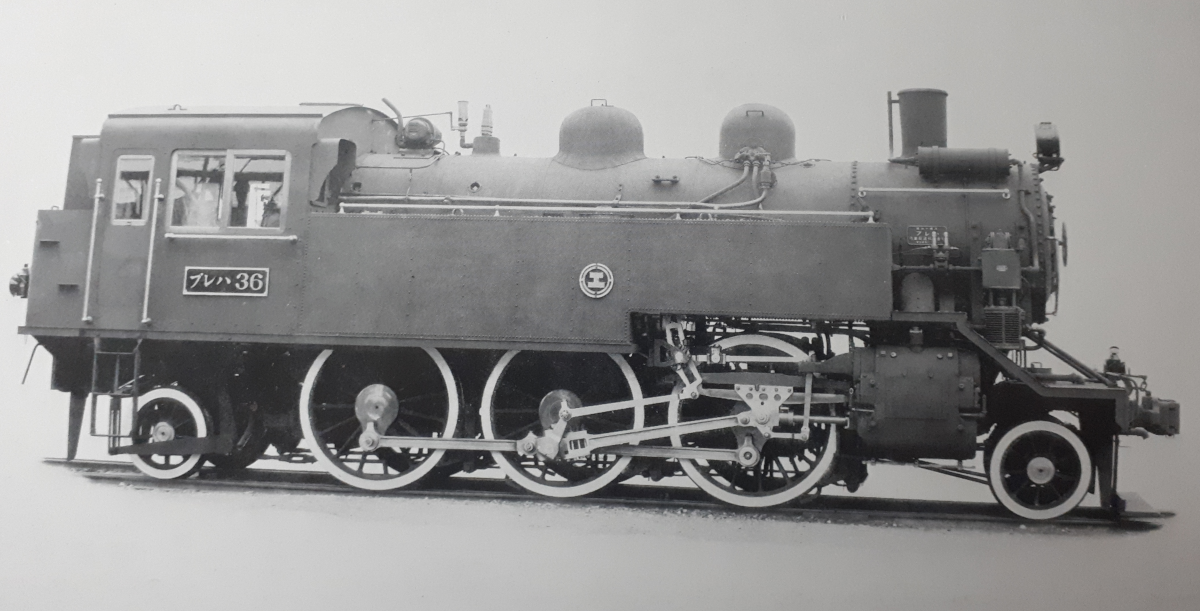
- Builder's photo of Sentetsu プレハ36, built by Kisha Seizō in 1939.
Type and origin
- Power type: Steam
- Builder: Gyeongseong Works, Hitachi, Kisha Seizō
- Build date: 1932 (Gyeongseong); 1939 (Hitachi, Kisha Seizō)
- Total produced: 38
Specifications
- Configuration
  - Whyte: 2-6-2T
- Gauge: 1,435 mm (4 ft 8 1/2 in)
- Driver dia.: 1,520 mm (60 in)
- Length: 10,800 mm (35 ft 5 in)
- Width: 3,010 mm (9 ft 11 in)
- Height: 3,940 mm (12 ft 11 in)
- Adhesive weight: 43.90 t (43.21 long tons)
- Loco weight: 67.70 t (66.63 long tons)
- Fuel capacity: 2.00 t (1.97 long tons)
- Water cap.: 5,000 L (1,300 US gal)
- Firebox
  - Grate area: 2.40 m^{2} (25.8 sq ft)
- Boiler
  - Small tubes: 89 x 51 mm (2.0 in)
  - Large tubes: 18 x 137 mm (5.4 in)
- Boiler pressure: 14.0 kgf/cm^{2} (199 psi)
- Heating surface
  - Firebox: 10.20 m^{2} (109.8 sq ft)
  - Tubes: 69.60 m^{2} (749.2 sq ft)
  - Total surface: 104.30 m^{2} (1,122.7 sq ft)
- Superheater
  - Heating area: 24.50 m^{2} (263.7 sq ft)
- Cylinders: 1
- Cylinder size: 410 mm × 610 mm (16 in × 24 in)
- Valve gear: Walschaerts
Performance figures
- Maximum speed: 90 km/h (56 mph)
- Tractive effort: 78.9 kN (17,700 lb_{f})
Career
- Operators: Chosen Government Railway; Korean National Railroad; Korean State Railway
- Class: Sentetsu: プレハ; KNR: 푸러8; KSR: 부러파
- Number in class: Sentetsu: 38
- Numbers: Sentetsu: プレハ1 – プレハ38
- Delivered: 1932, 1939

The Pureha-class (プレハ) locomotives were a group of steam tank locomotives with 2-6-2 wheel arrangement of used by the Chosen Government Railway (Sentetsu) in Korea. The "Pure" name came from the American naming system for steam locomotives, under which locomotives with 2-6-2 wheel arrangement were called "Prairie".

In all, Sentetsu owned 227 locomotives of all Pure classes, whilst privately owned railways owned another 52; of these 279 locomotives, 169 went to the Korean National Railroad in South Korea and 110 to the Korean State Railway in North Korea.

== Description ==
The プレハ (Pureha) class was the eighth and final class of 2-6-2 locomotives procured by Sentetsu. They were designed by Sentetsu as the most advanced locomotives in Korea at the time of their introduction, and the first twelve were built in 1932 by the Gyeongsong Works. A further 26 were built in 1939 by Hitachi and Kisha Seizō and assembled at Sentetsu's Busan shops. Unlike previous Pure class locomotives, the Pureha class had larger driving wheels, with a diameter of 1,520 mm (60 in), which increased their maximum speed to 90 km/h (56 mph). They were frequently used for express trains on the Gyeongin Line.

== Postwar ==
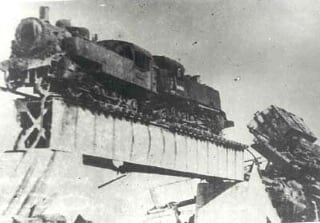
A Pureha class locomotive in North Korea during the Korean War, with a Purena-class engine behind it.

After the end of the Pacific War and the subsequent partition of Korea, these locomotives were divided between North and South Korea.

=== Korean National Railroad 푸러8 (Pureo8) class ===
Many Pureha class locomotives were used by the Korean National Railroad after Liberation, which designated them 푸러8 (Pureo8) class; they were used by the KNR primarily for shunting duties, and on light local and suburban passenger services.

=== Korean State Railway 부러파 (Purŏp'a) class/1800 series ===
The Sentetsu Purena class locomotives that remained in the North after the partition of Korea were operated by the Korean State Railway, designating them 부러파 (Purŏp'a) class, and later renumbering them into the 1800 series around the early 1970s. The total number and identities of the engines that went north is uncertain, but it is known プレハ38 had gone to the north, where it was in use around Hamheung in 1951, still carrying Sentetsu number plates and emblems. It is unknown whether the locomotive remained in the North after the Korean War, or if it was taken by UN forces during the withdrawal.

== Construction ==
Sentetsu Purena-class
Sentetsu running number		Postwar					
1938–1945	pre-1938	Owner	Number	Builder	Year	Works no.	Notes
プレハ1	プレ351	KNR	푸러8-1	Gyeongseong	1932		
プレハ2	プレ352	?	?	Gyeongseong	1932		
プレハ3	プレ353	?	?	Gyeongseong	1932		
プレハ4	プレ354	?	?	Gyeongseong	1932		
プレハ5	プレ355	?	?	Gyeongseong	1932		
プレハ6	プレ356	?	?	Gyeongseong	1932		
プレハ7	プレ357	?	?	Gyeongseong	1932		
プレハ8	プレ358	?	?	Gyeongseong	1932		
プレハ9	プレ359	?	?	Gyeongseong	1932		
プレハ10	プレ360	?	?	Gyeongseong	1932		
プレハ11	プレ361	?	?	Gyeongseong	1932		
プレハ12	プレ362	?	?	Gyeongseong	1932		
プレハ13	-	KNR	푸러8-13	Hitachi	1939		Large Latin "KNR" lettering in 1954.
プレハ14	-	KNR	푸러8-14	Hitachi	1939		
プレハ15	-	KNR	푸러8-15	Hitachi	1939		Derelict by 1953.
プレハ16	-	?	?	Hitachi	1939		
プレハ17	-	?	?	Hitachi	1939		
プレハ18	-	?	?	Hitachi	1939		
プレハ19	-	KNR	푸러8-19	Hitachi	1939		In service in 1960.
プレハ20	-	KNR	푸러8-20	Hitachi	1939		
プレハ21	-	?	?	Hitachi	1939		
プレハ22	-	KNR	푸러8-22	Hitachi	1939		
プレハ23	-	KNR	푸러8-23	Hitachi	1939		
プレハ24	-	?	?	Hitachi	1939		
プレハ25	-	KNR	푸러8-25	Hitachi	1939		
プレハ26	-	?	?	Hitachi	1939		
プレハ27	-	?	?	Hitachi	1939		
プレハ28	-	KNR	푸러8-28	Hitachi	1939		
プレハ29	-	?	?	Hitachi	1939		
プレハ30	-	?	?	Kisha Seizō	1939	1710	
プレハ31	-	?	?	Kisha Seizō	1939	1711	
プレハ32	-	?	?	Kisha Seizō	1939	1712	
プレハ33	-	?	?	Kisha Seizō	1939	1713	
プレハ34	-	?	?	Kisha Seizō	1939	1714	
プレハ35	-	?	?	Kisha Seizō	1939	1715	
プレハ36	-	?	?	Kisha Seizō	1939	1716	
プレハ37	-	?	?	Kisha Seizō	1939	1717	
プレハ38	-	KSR	부러파38	Kisha Seizō	1939	1718	Still with Sentetsu number plates in 1951.
