= China Railways PL3 =

2-6-2 steam locomotive

China Railways PL3 Chosen Government Railway Purena class (プレナ) Gyeongchun Railway Purena class (プレナ) Korean National Railroad Pureo7 class (푸러7) Korean State Railway Purŏch'i class (부러치) South Manchuria Railway Puresa class (プレサ)
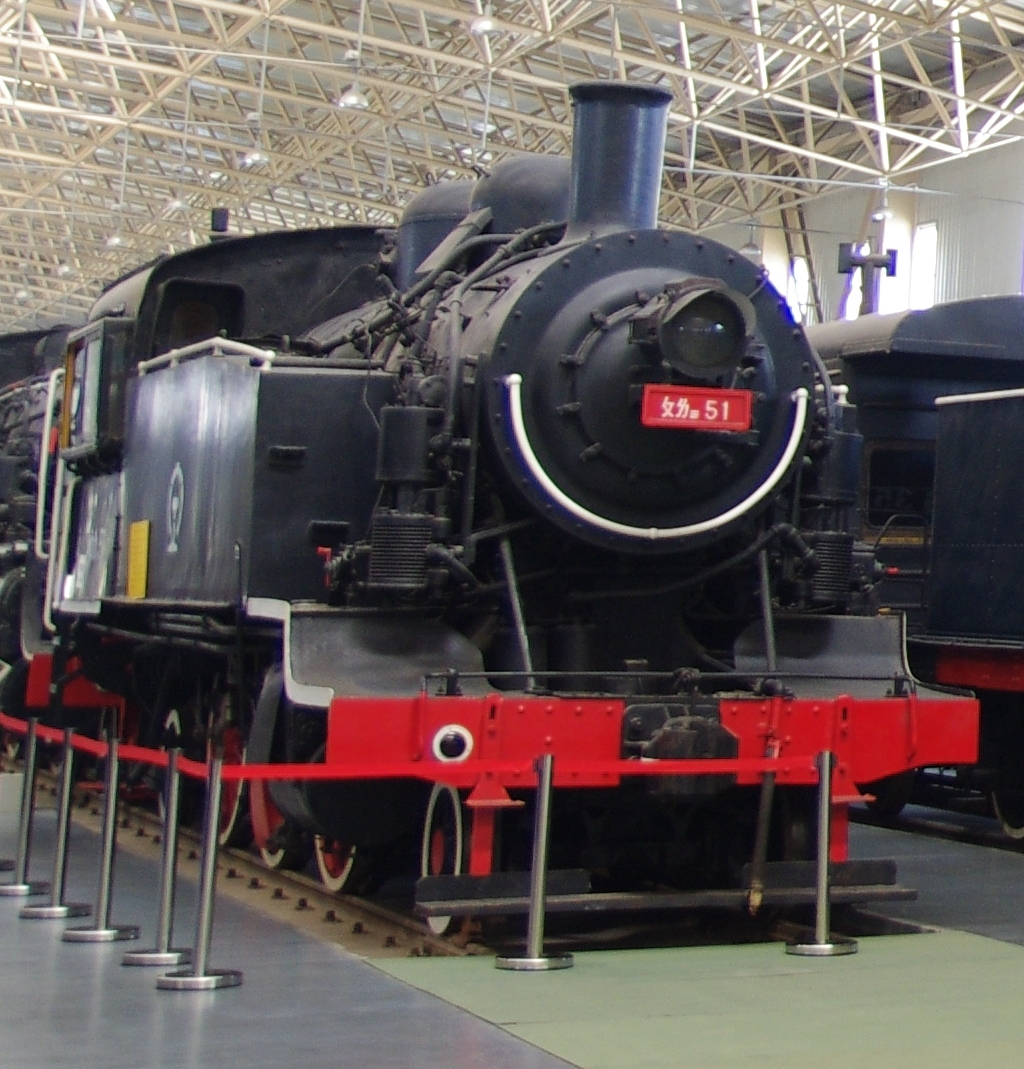
- China Railways PL3-51 at Beijing Railway Museum. This was originally a Mantetsu Puresa-class locomotive.
Type and origin
- Power type: Steam
- Builder: Original: Hitachi Kasato, Kawasaki; Bureau: Gyeongseong Works, Kawasaki, Hitachi Kasato, Nippon Sharyō
- Build date: 1930–1941
- Total produced: 112
Specifications
- Configuration
  - Whyte: 2-6-2T
- Gauge: 1,435 mm (4 ft 8 1/2 in)
- Driver dia.: 1,370 mm (54 in)
- Length: Original: 10,480 mm (34 ft 5 in); Bureau: 10,773 mm (35 ft 4.1 in)
- Width: Original: 3,250 mm (10 ft 8 in); Bureau: 3,200 mm (10 ft 6 in)
- Height: Original: 4,268 mm (14 ft 0 in); Bureau: 4,230 mm (13 ft 11 in)
- Adhesive weight: Original: 42.00 t (41.34 long tons); Bureau: 44.90 t (44.19 long tons)
- Loco weight: Original: 65.50 t (64.47 long tons); Bureau: 67.70 t (66.63 long tons)
- Fuel type: Coal
- Fuel capacity: Original: 2.50 t (2.46 long tons); Bureau: 3.00 t (2.95 long tons)
- Water cap.: Both: 7,000 L (1,800 US gal)
- Firebox
  - Grate area: Both: 2.60 m^{2} (28.0 sq ft)
- Boiler
  - Small tubes: Original: 106 x 45 mm (1.8 in); Bureau: 104 x 51 mm (2.0 in)
  - Large tubes: Original: 26 x 137 mm (5.4 in); Bureau: 21 x 137 mm (5.4 in)
- Boiler pressure: Both: 13.0 kgf/cm^{2} (185 psi)
- Heating surface
  - Firebox: Original: 11.60 m^{2} (124.9 sq ft); Bureau: 9.50 m^{2} (102.3 sq ft)
  - Tubes: Original: 73.10 m^{2} (786.8 sq ft); Bureau: 82.80 m^{2} (891.3 sq ft)
  - Total surface: Original: 116.90 m^{2} (1,258.3 sq ft); Bureau: 118.30 m^{2} (1,273.4 sq ft)
- Superheater
  - Heating area: Original: None; Bureau: 26.00 m^{2} (279.9 sq ft)
- Cylinders: One
- Cylinder size: Both: 430 mm × 610 mm (17 in × 24 in)
- Valve gear: Walschaerts
Performance figures
- Maximum speed: 75 km/h (47 mph)
- Tractive effort: Original: 85.0 kN (19,100 lb_{f}); Bureau: 89.0 kN (20,000 lb_{f})
Career
- Operators: Chosen Government Railway; Gyeongchun Railway; Korean National Railroad; Korean State Railway; South Manchuria Railway; Chinese Changchun Railway; China Railway
- Class: Sentetsu: プレナ; KNR: 푸러7; KSR: 부러치; Mantetsu: プレサ; CR: PL3
- Number in class: Sentetsu: 93; Gyeongchun: 9 Mantetsu: 18; CR: 10
- Numbers: Sentetsu: プレナ1 – プレナ93; Mantetsu: プレサ1 – プレサ18; CR: PL3-51 – PL3-60
- Delivered: 1930–1941
- Preserved: PL3 51
- Disposition: 1 preserved, remainder scrapped

The China Railways PL3 (プレニ3, Pureni, "pure") class steam locomotive was a class of 2-6-2T "Prairie" type steam locomotives for freight trains operated by the China Railway and the Chosen Government Railway (Sentetsu) in Korea. The "Pure" name came from the American naming system for steam locomotives, under which locomotives with 2-6-2 wheel arrangement were called "Prairie".

In all, Sentetsu owned 227 locomotives of all Pure classes, whilst privately owned railways owned another 52; of these 279 locomotives, 169 went to the Korean National Railroad in South Korea and 110 to the Korean State Railway in North Korea.

== Description ==
Locomotives of this design were built for the Minami-Chosen Railway in Korea, the Chosen Government Railway, and the privately owned Gyeongchun Railway in Korea, as well as for the South Manchuria Railway.

=== Chosen Government Railway プレナ (Purena) class ===
The プレナ (Purena) class locomotive was designed by the Railway Bureau based on the experiences gained through the design of modifications leading to the Pureshi-class rebuilds, and differed considerably from the imported Pure classes. The first eight were built for the Minami-Chosen Railway, with Hitachi's Kasato factory and Kawasaki each building four units; these were bought by Sentetsu in 1936 and numbered 341–348.

The design was then modified to include a superheater, but the resulting design retained the "Purena" classification; the two subclasses were thenceforward referred to as the "Original Purena" and "Bureau Purena" (局プリナ) classes. The first six Bureau Purena locomotives were built for Sentetsu in 1931 by the Gyeongseong Works; these were numbered 321 through 326. The 14 locomotives of both Purena subtypes were lumped together in Sentetsu's general renumbering of 1938, with 341–348 becoming プレナ1 through プレナ8, and 321–326 becoming プレナ9 through プレナ14. In 1938 four more were built by Nippon Sharyō and fourteen more were built at Gyeongseong. In 1939 and 1941, a total of nine were built by Kawasaki and Hitachi Kasato for the Gyeongchun Railway; these were assembled in Korea at Sentetsu's Busan shops and numbered プレナ85 through プレナ93.

=== South Manchuria Railway プレサ (Puresa) class ===
Nineteen locomotives of the Sentetsu Purena design were built for the South Manchuria Railway (Mantetsu) in Japan in 1935. Although under the Mantetsu classification system tank locomotives were generally given the "Dabu" (ダブ, from "double-ender") classification, Mantetsu instead designated these as プレサ (Puresa) class; eight were assigned to Mantetsu's Rajin depot for use on the North Chosen Line, whilst the other ten were assigned to depots in Manchukuo.

== Postwar ==
After the end of the Pacific War, the locomotives owned by Sentetsu and the Gyeongchun Railway were divided between North and South Korea, whilst those belonging to Mantetsu were divided between North Korea and China.

=== Korean National Railroad 푸러7 (Pureo7) class ===
Many Purena class locomotives ended up with the Korean National Railroad after Liberation, which designated them 푸러7 (Pureo7) class; at least 15 are known to have been operated by the KNR. All have since been scrapped.

=== Korean State Railway 부러치 (Purŏch'i) class/1700 series ===
The Sentetsu Purena class locomotives that remained in the North after the partition of Korea were operated by the Korean State Railway, designating them 부러치 (Purŏch'i) class, and later renumbering them into the 1700 series around the early 1970s. Three examples, numbers 1709, 1718, and 1720, were operational at the steelworks in Ch'ŏngjin as of November 2019, being used for tourist events.

=== Korean State Railway 부러서 (Purŏsŏ) class/1300 series ===
The nine Puresa-class locomotives that Mantetsu had assigned to its Rajin depot were taken over by the Korean State Railway after the war. They were initially designated 부러서 (Purŏsŏ) class - together with the Puresa-class engines inherited from Sentetsu - and were retained in use mostly around Rajin; around the early 1970s, they were renumbered into the 1300 series, though at least one's number omitted the initial '1'. At least two have been seen operational in the 21st century; one, 1304, was seen in 2001 doing shunting work at Ch'ŏngjin, while the other, 1319, is still operational as of October 2015, kept in pristine condition for use with tourist and railfan trains.

The one unit known to have omitted the initial '1', number 307, was inspected by Kim Jong-il as a child at Rajin Station on 6 September 1954. This locomotive has also been depicted on a commemorative stamp issued by the DPRK postal service.

=== China Railways PL3 class ===
The ten Puresa-class engines that were used by Mantetsu in Manchukuo were taken over first by the joint Chinese-Soviet "Chinese Changchun Railway" (Chinese: 中國長春鐵路, Zhōngguó Chǎngchūn Tiělù; Russian: Кита́йская Чанчу́ньская желе́зная доро́га, Kitayskaya Chanchun'skaya Zheleznaya doroga), which took over Mantetsu operations within China in 1945. In 1952, the Chinese Changchun Railway was returned to China, and they were taken over by the China Railway as class ㄆㄌ3. In 1959, they were designated class PL3, numbered 51–60.

== Construction ==
Sentetsu Purena-class
Sentetsu running number		Postwar				
1938–1945	pre-1938	Owner	Number	Builder	Year	Notes
プレナ1	プレ341	?	?	Hitachi Kasato	1930	Original Purena. Built for Gyeongchun Railway, bought by Sentetsu in 1936.
プレナ2	プレ342	?	?	Hitachi Kasato	1930	Original Purena. Built for Gyeongchun Railway, bought by Sentetsu in 1936.
プレナ3	プレ343	?	?	Hitachi Kasato	1930	Original Purena. Built for Gyeongchun Railway, bought by Sentetsu in 1936.
プレナ4	プレ344	?	?	Hitachi Kasato	1930	Original Purena. Built for Gyeongchun Railway, bought by Sentetsu in 1936.
プレナ5	プレ345	KNR	푸러7-5	Kawasaki	1930	Original Purena. Built for Gyeongchun Railway, bought by Sentetsu in 1936.
プレナ6	プレ346	?	?	Kawasaki	1930	Original Purena. Built for Gyeongchun Railway, bought by Sentetsu in 1936.
プレナ7	プレ347	?	?	Kawasaki	1930	Original Purena. Built for Gyeongchun Railway, bought by Sentetsu in 1936.
プレナ8	プレ348	?	?	Kawasaki	1930	Original Purena. Built for Gyeongchun Railway, bought by Sentetsu in 1936.
プレナ9	プレ321	KNR	푸러7-9	Gyeongseong	1931	Bureau Purena.
プレナ10	プレ322	?	?	Gyeongseong	1931	Bureau Purena.
プレナ11	プレ323	KNR	푸러7-11	Gyeongseong	1931	Bureau Purena.
プレナ12	プレ324	?	?	Gyeongseong	1931	Bureau Purena.
プレナ13	プレ325	?	?	Gyeongseong	1931	Bureau Purena.
プレナ14	プレ326	?	?	Gyeongseong	1931	Bureau Purena.
プレナ15	-	KNR	푸러7-15	Nippon Sharyō	1938	Bureau Purena.
プレナ16	-	KNR	푸러7-16	Nippon Sharyō	1938	Bureau Purena.
プレナ17	-	KNR	푸러7-17	Nippon Sharyō	1938	Bureau Purena.
プレナ18	-	KSR	부러치18 → 1718	Nippon Sharyō	1938	Bureau Purena.
プレナ19	-	?	?	Gyeongseong	1938	Bureau Purena.
プレナ20	-	?	?	Gyeongseong	1938	Bureau Purena.
プレナ21	-	?	?	Gyeongseong	1938	Bureau Purena.
プレナ22	-	?	?	Gyeongseong	1938	Bureau Purena.
プレナ23	-	?	?	Gyeongseong	1938	Bureau Purena.
プレナ24	-	?	?	Gyeongseong	1938	Bureau Purena.
プレナ25	-	KNR	푸러7-25	Gyeongseong	1938	Bureau Purena.
プレナ26	-	?	?	Gyeongseong	1938	Bureau Purena.
プレナ27	-	?	?	Gyeongseong	1938	Bureau Purena.
プレナ28	-	?	?	Gyeongseong	1938	Bureau Purena.
プレナ29	-	?	?	Gyeongseong	1938	Bureau Purena.
プレナ30	-	?	?	Gyeongseong	1938	Bureau Purena.
プレナ31	-	KNR	푸러7-31	Gyeongseong	1938	Bureau Purena.
プレナ32	-	?	?	Gyeongseong	1938	Bureau Purena.
プレナ33	-	?	?	?	?	Bureau Purena.
プレナ34	-	?	?	?	?	Bureau Purena.
プレナ35	-	?	?	?	?	Bureau Purena.
プレナ36	-	?	?	?	?	Bureau Purena.
プレナ37	-	?	?	?	?	Bureau Purena.
プレナ38	-	KSR	부러치 38	?	?	Bureau Purena.
プレナ39	-	?	?	?	?	Bureau Purena.
プレナ40	-	?	?	?	?	Bureau Purena.
プレナ41	-	?	?	?	?	Bureau Purena.
プレナ42	-	?	?	?	?	Bureau Purena.
プレナ43	-	?	?	?	?	Bureau Purena.
プレナ44	-	?	?	?	?	Bureau Purena.
プレナ45	-	?	?	?	?	Bureau Purena.
プレナ46	-	?	?	?	?	Bureau Purena.
プレナ47	-	?	?	?	?	Bureau Purena.
プレナ48	-	KNR	푸러7-48	?	?	Bureau Purena.
プレナ49	-	KNR	푸러7-49	?	?	Bureau Purena.
プレナ50	-	?	?	?	?	Bureau Purena.
プレナ51	-	?	?	?	?	Bureau Purena.
プレナ52	-	?	?	?	?	Bureau Purena.
プレナ53	-	?	?	?	?	Bureau Purena.
プレナ54	-	?	?	?	?	Bureau Purena.
プレナ55	-	?	?	?	?	Bureau Purena.
プレナ56	-	?	?	?	?	Bureau Purena.
プレナ57	-	?	?	?	?	Bureau Purena.
プレナ58	-	?	?	?	?	Bureau Purena.
プレナ59	-	?	?	?	?	Bureau Purena.
プレナ60	-	?	?	?	?	Bureau Purena.
プレナ61	-	?	?	?	?	Bureau Purena.
プレナ62	-	KNR	푸러7-62	?	?	Bureau Purena.
プレナ63	-	?	?	?	?	Bureau Purena.
プレナ64	-	KNR	푸러7-64	?	?	Bureau Purena.
プレナ65	-	?	?	?	?	Bureau Purena.
プレナ66	-	KNR	푸러7-66	?	?	Bureau Purena.
プレナ67	-	?	?	?	?	Bureau Purena.
プレナ68	-	?	?	?	?	Bureau Purena.
プレナ69	-	?	?	?	?	Bureau Purena.
プレナ70	-	?	?	?	?	Bureau Purena.
プレナ71	-	?	?	?	?	Bureau Purena.
プレナ72	-	?	?	?	?	Bureau Purena.
プレナ73	-	?	?	?	?	Bureau Purena.
プレナ74	-	?	?	?	?	Bureau Purena.
プレナ75	-	?	?	?	?	Bureau Purena.
プレナ76	-	?	?	?	?	Bureau Purena.
プレナ77	-	?	?	?	?	Bureau Purena.
プレナ78	-	?	?	?	?	Bureau Purena.
プレナ79	-	?	?	?	?	Bureau Purena.
プレナ80	-	?	?	?	?	Bureau Purena.
プレナ81	-	?	?	?	?	Bureau Purena.
プレナ82	-	?	?	?	?	Bureau Purena.
プレナ83	-	?	?	?	?	Bureau Purena.
プレナ84	-	?	?	?	?	Bureau Purena.
プレナ85	-	KNR	푸러7-85	Kawasaki	1939	Bureau Purena; Gyeongchun Railway. Assembled in Busan.
プレナ86	-	KNR	푸러7-86	Kawasaki	1939	Bureau Purena; Gyeongchun Railway. Assembled in Busan.
プレナ87	-	KNR	푸러7-87	Kawasaki	1939	Bureau Purena; Gyeongchun Railway. Assembled in Busan.
プレナ88	-	KNR	푸러7-88	Kawasaki	1939	Bureau Purena; Gyeongchun Railway. Assembled in Busan.
プレナ89	-	KNR	푸러7-89	Kawasaki	1939	Bureau Purena; Gyeongchun Railway. Assembled in Busan.
プレナ90	-	KNR	푸러7-90	Kawasaki	1939	Bureau Purena; Gyeongchun Railway. Assembled in Busan. Derelict by 1953.
プレナ91	-	KNR	푸러7-91	Kawasaki	1939	Bureau Purena; Gyeongchun Railway. Assembled in Busan.
プレナ92	-	KNR	푸러7-92	Kawasaki	1939	Bureau Purena; Gyeongchun Railway. Assembled in Busan.
プレナ93	-	KNR	푸러7-93	Hitachi Kasato	1941	Bureau Purena; Gyeongchun Railway. Assembled in Busan.

Mantetsu Puresa-class. Due to renumbering, original identities of the ten Chinese locomotives not yet known.
	Postwar				
Mantetsu number	Owner	Number	Builder	Year	Notes
プレサ1			Japan	1935	
プレサ1			Japan	1935	
プレサ1			Japan	1935	
プレサ4	KSR	부러서4 → 1304	Japan	1935	Active at Ch'ongjin in 2001.
プレサ5			Japan	1935	
プレサ6			Japan	1935	
プレサ7	KSR	부러서7 → 307	Japan	1935	inspected by Kim Jong-il as a child at Rajin Station on 6 September 1954.
プレサ8			Japan	1935	
プレサ9			Japan	1935	
プレサ10			Japan	1935	
プレサ11			Japan	1935	
プレサ12			Japan	1935	
プレサ13			Japan	1935	
プレサ14			Japan	1935	
プレサ15			Japan	1935	
プレサ16			Japan	1935	
プレサ17			Japan	1935	
プレサ18			Japan	1935	
プレサ19	KSR	부러서19 → 1319	Japan	1935	Operational as of October 2015.
