= Sentetsu Puresa-class locomotives =

2-6-2 steam locomotive

Chosen Government Railway Puresa class (プレサ) Korean National Railroad Pureo3 class (푸러3) Korean State Railway Purŏsŏ class (부러서)
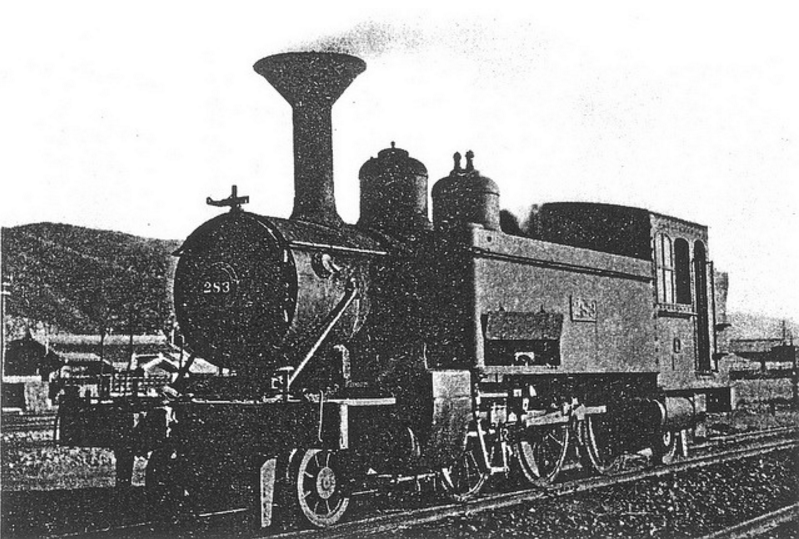
- Sentetsu プレ283 as built, later プレサ3
Type and origin
- Power type: Steam
- Builder: Borsig
- Build date: 1912
- Total produced: 14
Specifications
- Configuration
  - Whyte: 2-6-2T
- Gauge: 1,435 mm (4 ft 8 1/2 in)
- Driver dia.: 1,370 mm (54 in)
- Length: 10,338 mm (33 ft 11.0 in)
- Width: 3,000 mm (9 ft 10 in)
- Height: 3,880 mm (12 ft 9 in)
- Adhesive weight: 37.00 t (36.42 long tons)
- Loco weight: 52.00 t (51.18 long tons)
- Fuel capacity: 1.25 t (1.23 long tons)
- Water cap.: 5,900 L (1,600 US gal)
- Firebox
  - Grate area: 1.69 m^{2} (18.2 sq ft)
- Boiler
  - Small tubes: 177 x 51 mm (2.0 in)
- Boiler pressure: 11.5 kgf/cm^{2} (164 psi)
- Heating surface
  - Firebox: 9.50 m^{2} (102.3 sq ft)
  - Tubes: 89.60 m^{2} (964.4 sq ft)
  - Total surface: 99.10 m^{2} (1,066.7 sq ft)
- Cylinders: 1
- Cylinder size: 410 mm × 610 mm (16 in × 24 in)
- Valve gear: Walschaerts
Performance figures
- Maximum speed: 75 km/h (47 mph)
- Tractive effort: 72.1 kN (16,200 lb_{f})
Career
- Operators: Chosen Government Railway; Korean National Railroad; Korean State Railway
- Class: Sentetsu: プレサ; KNR: 푸러3; KSR: 부러서
- Number in class: Sentetsu: 14
- Numbers: Sentetsu: プレサ1–プレサ14
- Delivered: 1912

The Puresa-class (プレサ) locomotives were a group of steam tank locomotives with 2-6-2 wheel arrangement of used by the Chosen Government Railway (Sentetsu) in Korea. The "Pure" name came from the American naming system for steam locomotives, under which locomotives with 2-6-2 wheel arrangement were called "Prairie".

In all, Sentetsu owned 227 locomotives of all Pure classes, whilst privately owned railways owned another 52; of these 279 locomotives, 169 went to the Korean National Railroad in South Korea and 110 to the Korean State Railway in North Korea.

== Description ==
The Puresa class was a group of 14 locomotives built in 1912 by the Borsig works of Germany. The fourteen were delivered in 1912. They were larger than the preceding Purei- and Pureni-classes, with greater coal and water capacity, and were the first locomotives in Korea with Walschaerts valve gear. Like the previous types, they were delivered in knockdown form, and assembled at Sentetsu's shops in Busan.

== Postwar ==
After the liberation and partition of Korea, they were divided between North and South, but the specifics of which engine went where are unclear; those going to the Korean National Railroad in the South would be designated 푸러3 (Pureo3) class, those with the Korean State Railway in the North would be designated 부러서 (Purŏsŏ) class.

== Construction ==
Sentetsu running number		Postwar				
1911–1938	1938–1945	Owner	Number	Builder	Year	Notes
プレ281	プレサ1	?	?	Borsig	1912	
プレ282	プレサ2	?	?	Borsig	1912	
プレ283	プレサ3	?	?	Borsig	1912	
プレ284	プレサ4	?	?	Borsig	1912	
プレ285	プレサ5	?	?	Borsig	1912	
プレ286	プレサ6	?	?	Borsig	1912	
プレ287	プレサ7	?	?	Borsig	1912	
プレ288	プレサ8	?	?	Borsig	1912	
プレ289	プレサ9	?	?	Borsig	1912	
プレ290	プレサ10	?	?	Borsig	1912	
プレ291	プレサ11	?	?	Borsig	1912	
プレ292	プレサ12	?	?	Borsig	1912	
プレ293	プレサ13	?	?	Borsig	1912	
プレ294	プレサ14	?	?	Borsig	1912	
