= Sentetsu Tehosa-class locomotive =

4-6-0 steam locomotive

Chosen Government Railway Tehosa class (テホサ) Korean National Railroad Teou3 class (터우3) Korean State Railway Tŏusŏ class (더우서)
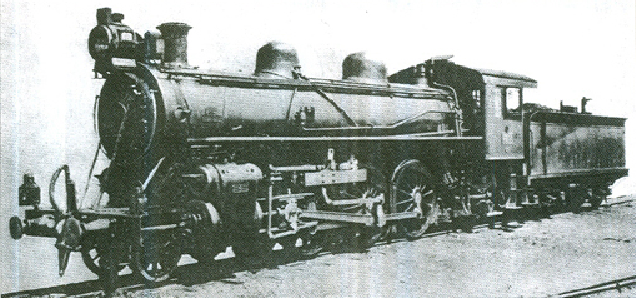
- Builder's photo of a Tehosa-class locomotive.
Type and origin
- Power type: Steam
- Builder: ALCo, Gyeongseong Works
- Build date: 1911, 1938
- Total produced: 9 (1911, ALCo), 1 (1938, Gyeongseong)
Specifications
- Configuration
  - Whyte: 4-6-0
- Gauge: 1,435 mm (4 ft 8 1/2 in)
- Driver dia.: 1,680 mm (66 in)
- Length: 17,642 mm (57 ft 10.6 in)
- Width: 2,821 mm (9 ft 3.1 in)
- Height: 4,232 mm (13 ft 10.6 in)
- Loco weight: 67.60 t (66.53 long tons)
- Tender weight: 43.46 t (42.77 long tons)
- Fuel capacity: 6.00 t (5.91 long tons)
- Water cap.: 15,100 L (4,000 US gal)
- Firebox
  - Grate area: 4.39 m^{2} (47.3 sq ft)
- Boiler
  - Small tubes: 310 x 57 mm (2.2 in)
  - Large tubes: 24 x 137 mm (5.4 in)
- Boiler pressure: 12.6 kgf/cm^{2} (179 psi)
- Heating surface
  - Firebox: 12.00 m^{2} (129.2 sq ft)
  - Tubes: 158.80 m^{2} (1,709.3 sq ft)
  - Total surface: 170.80 m^{2} (1,838.5 sq ft)
- Superheater
  - Heating area: 46.90 m^{2} (504.8 sq ft)
- Cylinders: 1
- Cylinder size: 510 mm × 660 mm (20 in × 26 in)
- Valve gear: Stephenson
Performance figures
- Maximum speed: 95 km/h (59 mph)
- Tractive effort: 111.0 kN (25,000 lb_{f})
Career
- Operators: Chosen Government Railway; Korean National Railroad; Korean State Railway
- Class: Sentetsu: テホサ; KNR: 터우3; KSR: 더우서
- Number in class: 10
- Numbers: Sentetsu: テホサ1–テホサ10
- Delivered: 1911, 1938
- Data for locomotives as rebuilt in the 1930s.

The Tehosa-class (テホサ) locomotives were a class of steam tender locomotives of the Chosen Government Railway (Sentetsu) with a 4-6-0 wheel arrangement. The "Teho" name came from the American naming system for steam locomotives, under which locomotives with 4-6-0 wheel arrangement were called "Ten Wheeler".

After the Liberation of Korea, of the 178 surviving locomotives of all Teho classes - including six previously owned by private railway companies - 106 went to the Korean National Railroad in the South, and 72 to the Korean State Railway in the North.

== Description ==
Whilst the first two classes of 4-6-0 locomotives in Korea, the Tehoi and Tehoni classes, were built by Baldwin, Sentetsu turned to a different American manufacturer for the third class - ALCo's Brooks Works built nine such locomotives for Sentetsu in 1911. Intended for long-range mixed trains, they were initially numbered 222–230, and subsequently were renumbered 651–659 in 1918. After being rebuilt with superheaters in the 1930s, they were redesignated テホサ (Tehosa) class and numbered テホサ1 through テホサ9 in the 1938 general renumbering. Like all Teho-type locomotives operated by Sentetsu, they had driving wheels of 1,680 mm (66 in) and a top speed of 95 km/h (59 mph), and many were assigned to the Manpo Line in the northern part of the country. One final unit, テホサ10, was built by Gyeongseong Works in 1938.

== Postwar ==
=== Korean National Railroad 터우3 (Teou3) class ===
The exact dispersal of the ten Tehosa-class locomotives after the partition of Korea in 1945 and the division of Sentetsu assets in 1947 is uncertain, but at least two went to the South, where the Korean National Railroad designated them 터우3 (Teou3) class and were used primarily on branchline trains.

=== Korean State Railway 더우서 (Tŏusŏ) class ===
Having been assigned primarily to the Manpo Line, most of the class went to the North after the partition, where they were designated 더우서 (Tŏusŏ) class by the Korean State Railway, but little is known of their service lives and subsequent fates.

== Construction ==
Sentetsu running number			Postwar				
Original	1918–1938	1938–1945	Owner	Number	Builder	Year	Notes
222	テホ611	テホサ1	KNR	터우3-1	ALCo	1911	
223	テホ612	テホサ2	?	?	ALCo	1911	
224	テホ613	テホサ3	?	?	ALCo	1911	
225	テホ614	テホサ4	?	?	ALCo	1911	
226	テホ615	テホサ5	?	?	ALCo	1911	
227	テホ616	テホサ6	?	?	ALCo	1911	
228	テホ617	テホサ7	?	?	ALCo	1911	
229	テホ618	テホサ8	KNR	터우3-8	ALCo	1911	
230	テホ619	テホサ9	?	?	ALCo	1911	
-	-	テホサ10	?	?	Gyeongseong	1938	
Total							10
