= Sentetsu Purero-class locomotives =

2-6-2 steam locomotive

Chosen Government Railway Purero class (プレロ) Korean State Railway Purŏyu class (부러유)
Type and origin
- Power type: Steam
- Builder: Orenstein & Koppel
- Build date: 1911
- Total produced: 2
Specifications
- Configuration
  - Whyte: 2-6-2T
- Gauge: 1,435 mm (4 ft 8 1/2 in)
- Driver dia.: 1,370 mm (54 in)
- Length: 10,846 mm (35 ft 7.0 in)
- Width: 2,900 mm (9 ft 6 in)
- Height: 3,900 mm (12 ft 10 in)
- Adhesive weight: 34.70 t (34.15 long tons)
- Loco weight: 51.45 t (50.64 long tons)
- Fuel capacity: 1.60 t (1.57 long tons)
- Water cap.: 5,600 L (1,500 US gal)
- Firebox
  - Grate area: 1.80 m^{2} (19.4 sq ft)
- Boiler
  - Small tubes: 81 x 45 mm (1.8 in)
  - Large tubes: 12 x 137 mm (5.4 in)
- Boiler pressure: 12.0 kgf/cm^{2} (171 psi)
- Heating surface
  - Firebox: 7.60 m^{2} (81.8 sq ft)
  - Tubes: 74.40 m^{2} (800.8 sq ft)
  - Total surface: 74.40 m^{2} (800.8 sq ft)
- Superheater
  - Heating area: 19.00 m^{2} (204.5 sq ft)
- Cylinders: 1
- Cylinder size: 450 mm × 550 mm (18 in × 22 in)
- Valve gear: Walschaerts
Performance figures
- Maximum speed: 75 km/h (47 mph)
- Tractive effort: 72.0 kN (16,200 lb_{f})
Career
- Operators: Domun Railway; Chosen Government Railway; Korean State Railway
- Class: Sentetsu: プレロ; KSR: 부러유
- Number in class: 2
- Numbers: Sentetsu: プレロ1, プレロ2; KSR: 부러유1, 부러유2
- Delivered: 1911

The Purero-class (プレロ) locomotives were a group of steam tank locomotives with 2-6-2 wheel arrangement of used by the Chosen Government Railway (Sentetsu) in Korea. The "Pure" name came from the American naming system for steam locomotives, under which locomotives with 2-6-2 wheel arrangement were called "Prairie".

In all, Sentetsu owned 227 locomotives of all Pure classes, whilst privately owned railways owned another 52; of these 279 locomotives, 169 went to the Korean National Railroad in South Korea and 110 to the Korean State Railway in North Korea.

== Description ==
Orenstein & Koppel of Germany built two superheated 2-6-2 tank locomotives in 1911 which were operated by the privately owned Domun Railway after 1920. Both were taken over by Sentetsu after the nationalisation of the Domun Railway in 1929; after the general renumbering of 1938 they were designated プレロ (Purero) class and numbered プレロ1 and プレロ2.

== Postwar: Korean State Railway 부러유 (Purŏyu) class ==
After the Liberation and partition of Korea, both ended up in North Korea after Liberation, and were operated by the Korean State Railway designated 부러유 (Purŏyu) class.
