= Sentetsu Teho class locomotives =

Sentetsu Teho class
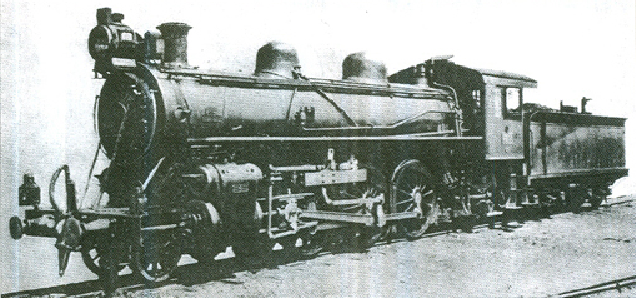
- Builder's photo of a Tehosa-class locomotive
Type and origin
- Power type: Steam
Specifications
- Configuration
  - Whyte: 4-6-0
- Gauge: 1,435 mm (4 ft 8 1/2 in)

The Teho or Teou (Japanese テホ, Korean 터우) class locomotives were a group of six distinct classes of steam tender locomotives of the Chosen Government Railway (Sentetsu) with 4-6-0 wheel arrangement. The "Teho" name came from the American naming system for steam locomotives, under which locomotives with 4-6-0 wheel arrangement were called "Ten Wheeler".

The first 4-6-0 steam locomotives in Korea were built for the Gyeongbu Railway by the Baldwin Locomotive Works of the United States in 1906, and the last ones were delivered in 1945 just before the end of the Japanese occupation of Korea. Initially they were used for mainline passenger trains, but as more powerful types were introduced, the Ten Wheelers were reassigned to freight trains and branchline duties. They were especially commonly used on the Manpo and Pyeongwon lines.

All classes of Teho type locomotives used in Korea were tender locomotives. All were fitted with driving wheels of 1,680 mm (66 in), and all had a top speed of 95 km/h (59 mph).

A total of six classes of Teho-type locomotives were used by Sentetsu:

- Tehoi
- Tehoni
- Tehosa
- Tehoshi
- Tehoko
- Tehoro

Of these, the Tehoro class was the most numerous and, notably, it was the first locomotive designed entirely by Sentetsu engineers.

After the partition of Korea, of the 178 surviving locomotives of all Teho classes - including six previously owned by private railway companies - 106 went to the Korean National Railroad in the South, and 72 to the Korean State Railway in the North.
