= Sentetsu Pureko-class locomotives =

2-6-2 steam locomotive

Chosen Government Railway Pureko class (プレコ) Korean State Railway Purŏo class (부러오)
Type and origin
- Power type: Steam
- Builder: Baldwin
- Build date: 1911
- Total produced: 2
Specifications
- Configuration
  - Whyte: 2-6-2T
- Gauge: 1,435 mm (4 ft 8 1/2 in)
- Driver dia.: 1,370 mm (54 in)
- Length: 10,480 mm (34 ft 5 in)
- Width: 3,100 mm (10 ft 2 in)
- Height: 4,328 mm (14 ft 2.4 in)
- Adhesive weight: 41.05 t (40.40 long tons)
- Loco weight: 58.91 t (57.98 long tons)
- Fuel capacity: 2.70 t (2.66 long tons)
- Water cap.: 6,500 L (1,700 US gal)
- Firebox
  - Grate area: 2.50 m^{2} (26.9 sq ft)
- Boiler
  - Small tubes: 166 x 51 mm (2.0 in)
- Boiler pressure: 11.5 kgf/cm^{2} (164 psi)
- Heating surface
  - Firebox: 9.50 m^{2} (102.3 sq ft)
  - Tubes: 97.90 m^{2} (1,053.8 sq ft)
  - Total surface: 97.90 m^{2} (1,053.8 sq ft)
- Cylinders: 1
- Cylinder size: 410 mm × 610 mm (16 in × 24 in)
- Valve gear: Walschaerts
Performance figures
- Maximum speed: 75 km/h (47 mph)
- Tractive effort: 66.0 kN (14,800 lb_{f})
Career
- Operators: Chosen Government Railway; Korean State Railway
- Class: Sentetsu: プレコ; KSR: 부러오
- Number in class: 2
- Numbers: Sentetsu: プレコ1, プレコ2; KSR: 부러오1, 부러오2
- Delivered: 1911

The Pureko-class (プレコ) locomotives were a group of steam tank locomotives with 2-6-2 wheel arrangement of used by the Chosen Government Railway (Sentetsu) in Korea. The "Pure" name came from the American naming system for steam locomotives, under which locomotives with 2-6-2 wheel arrangement were called "Prairie".

In all, Sentetsu owned 227 locomotives of all Pure classes, whilst privately owned railways owned another 52; of these 279 locomotives, 169 went to the Korean National Railroad in South Korea and 110 to the Korean State Railway in North Korea.

== Description ==
The Baldwin Locomotive Works of the United States built two 2-6-2 tank locomotives in 1911, which were operated by the privately owned Domun Railway after 1920. Both were taken over by Sentetsu after the nationalisation of the Domun Railway in 1929; after the general renumbering of 1938 they were designated プレコ (Pureko) class and numbered プレコ1 and プレコ2.

== Postwar: Korean State Railway 부러오 (Purŏo) class ==
After the Liberation and partition of Korea, both ended up in North Korea after Liberation, and were operated by the Korean State Railway designated 부러오 (Purŏo) class.
