= Sentetsu Pureni-class locomotives =

2-6-2 steam locomotive

Chosen Government Railway Pureni class (プレニ) Korean National Railroad Pureo2 class (푸러2) Korean State Railway Purŏdu class (부러두)
Type and origin
- Power type: Steam
- Builder: Baldwin, Nippon Sharyō
- Build date: 1905 Brooks (9), 1935 Nippon Sharyō (1)
- Total produced: 10
Specifications
- Configuration
  - Whyte: 2-6-2T
- Gauge: 1,435 mm (4 ft 8 1/2 in)
- Driver dia.: 1,370 mm (54 in)
- Length: 10,446 mm (34 ft 3.3 in)
- Width: 2,730 mm (8 ft 11 in)
- Height: 3,695 mm (12 ft 1.5 in)
- Adhesive weight: 37.00 t (36.42 long tons)
- Loco weight: 52.00 t (51.18 long tons)
- Fuel capacity: 1.78 t (1.75 long tons)
- Water cap.: 5,500 L (1,500 US gal)
- Firebox
  - Grate area: 1.66 m^{2} (17.9 sq ft)
- Boiler
  - Small tubes: 175 x 51 mm (2.0 in)
- Boiler pressure: 11.5 kgf/cm^{2} (164 psi)
- Heating surface
  - Firebox: 9.50 m^{2} (102.3 sq ft)
  - Tubes: 88.50 m^{2} (952.6 sq ft)
  - Total surface: 98.00 m^{2} (1,054.9 sq ft)
- Superheater
  - Type: ?
  - Heating area: ?
- Cylinders: 1
- Cylinder size: 410 mm × 610 mm (16 in × 24 in)
- Valve gear: Stephenson
Performance figures
- Maximum speed: 75 km/h (47 mph)
- Tractive effort: 72.1 kN (16,200 lb_{f})
Career
- Operators: Gyeongbu Railway; Chosen Government Railway; Korean National Railroad; Korean State Railway
- Class: Sentetsu: プレニ; KNR: 푸러2; KSR: 부러두
- Number in class: GR: 9 Sentetsu: 9
- Numbers: Sentetsu: プレニ1–プレニ9
- Delivered: 1905, 1935

The Pureni-class (プレニ) locomotives were a group of steam tank locomotives with 2-6-2 wheel arrangement of used by the Chosen Government Railway (Sentetsu) in Korea. The "Pure" name came from the American naming system for steam locomotives, under which locomotives with 2-6-2 wheel arrangement were called "Prairie".

In all, Sentetsu owned 227 locomotives of all Pure classes, whilst privately owned railways owned another 52; of these 279 locomotives, 169 went to the Korean National Railroad in South Korea and 110 to the Korean State Railway in North Korea.

== Description ==
The Pureni class was introduced in 1905, with nine built in the United States by the Brooks Locomotive Works. Unlike the Purei class, the Pureni had a superheated steam boiler. These, like the 1906 batch of Purei class locomotives, were delivered in knockdown form and assembled at the Incheon shops. The Gyeongbu Railway was nationalised by Sentetsu in 1906, and in 1918 they were renumbered 271 through 279. One further unit was built in 1935 by Nippon Sharyō, as a replacement for the original 276. The nine locomotives were renumbered プレニ1 through プレニ9 in the 1938 general renumbering.

== Postwar ==
After the Liberation and partition of Korea, they were divided between North and South, but the specifics of which engine went where are unclear.

=== Korean National Railroad 푸러2 (Pureo2) class ===
At least three Pureni-class locomotives ended up with the Korean National Railroad in the South after the division of Sentetsu's motive power following the partition of the country; these were designated 푸러2 (Pureo2) class by the KNR.

=== Korean State Railway 부러두 (Purŏdu) class/1200 series ===
The locomotives taken over by the Korean State Railway in the North were initially designated 부러두 (Purŏdu) class; they were later renumbered in the 1200 series. The total number, their service lives and subsequent fates are unknown.

== Construction ==
Original Gyeongbu Railway running numbers not known
Sentetsu running number		Postwar				
1918–1938	1938–1945	Owner	Number	Builder	Year	Notes
プレ271	プレニ1	?	?	Brooks	1905	Originally built for Gyeongbu Railway.
プレ272	プレニ2	?	?	Brooks	1905	Originally built for Gyeongbu Railway.
プレ273	プレニ3	?	?	Brooks	1905	Originally built for Gyeongbu Railway.
プレ274	プレニ4	KNR	푸러2-4	Brooks	1905	Originally built for Gyeongbu Railway. Withdrawn by 1953
プレ275	プレニ5	?	?	Brooks	1905	Originally built for Gyeongbu Railway.
プレ276 (1st)	-	-	-	Brooks	1905	Originally built for Gyeongbu Railway. Wrecked before 1935.
プレ276 (2nd)	プレニ6	?	?	Nippon Sharyō	1935	Built as replacement for 1st プレ276.
プレ277	プレニ7	?	?	Brooks	1905	Originally built for Gyeongbu Railway.
プレ278	プレニ8	KNR	푸러2-8	Brooks	1905	Originally built for Gyeongbu Railway. Destroyed during Korean War.
プレ279	プレニ9	KNR	푸러2-9	Brooks	1905	Originally built for Gyeongbu Railway. Operational in 1954.
