= Sentetsu Tehoko-class locomotive =

4-6-0 steam locomotive

Chosen Government Railway Tehoko class (テホコ) Korean National Railroad Teou5 class (터우5) Korean State Railway Tŏuo class (더우오)
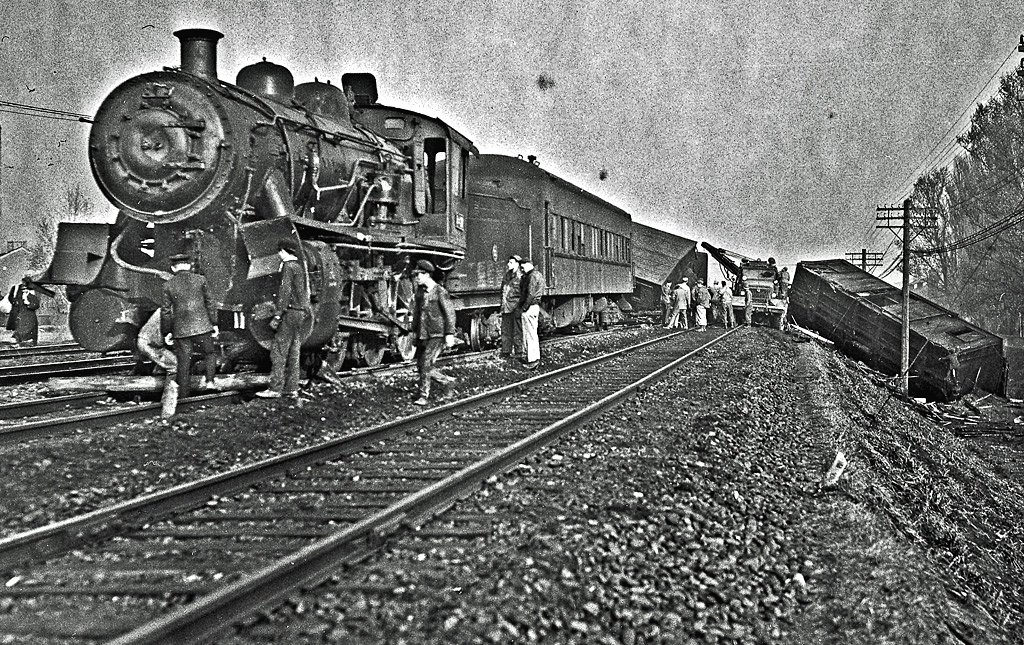
- A wrecked Sentetsu Tehoko-class locomotive in 1945.
Type and origin
- Power type: Steam
- Builder: ALCo, Shahekou Works
- Build date: 1917–1919
- Total produced: 36
Specifications
- Configuration
  - Whyte: 4-6-0
- Gauge: 1,435 mm (4 ft 8 1/2 in)
- Driver dia.: 1,680 mm (66 in)
- Length: 17,972 mm (58 ft 11.6 in)
- Width: 2,997 mm (9 ft 10.0 in)
- Height: 4,232 mm (13 ft 10.6 in)
- Loco weight: 72.52 t (71.37 long tons)
- Tender weight: 43.45 t (42.76 long tons)
- Fuel capacity: 6.00 t (5.91 long tons)
- Water cap.: 15,100 L (4,000 US gal)
- Firebox
  - Grate area: 3.73 m^{2} (40.1 sq ft)
- Boiler
  - Small tubes: 167 x 51 mm (2.0 in)
  - Large tubes: 20 x 137 mm (5.4 in)
- Boiler pressure: 12.6 kgf/cm^{2} (179 psi)
- Heating surface
  - Firebox: 12.00 m^{2} (129.2 sq ft)
  - Tubes: 161.90 m^{2} (1,742.7 sq ft)
  - Total surface: 175.50 m^{2} (1,889.1 sq ft)
- Superheater
  - Heating area: 38.60 m^{2} (415.5 sq ft)
- Cylinders: 1
- Cylinder size: 530 mm × 660 mm (21 in × 26 in)
- Valve gear: Walschaerts
Performance figures
- Maximum speed: 95 km/h (59 mph)
- Tractive effort: 120.0 kN (27,000 lb_{f})
Career
- Operators: Chosen Government Railway; Korean National Railroad; Korean State Railway
- Class: Sentetsu: テホコ; KNR: 터우5; KSR: 더우오
- Number in class: 36
- Numbers: Sentetsu: テホコ1–テホコ36
- Delivered: 1917–1919
- Preserved: 1
- Disposition: One preserved, remainder scrapped.

The Tehoko-class (テホコ) locomotives were a class of steam tender locomotives of the Chosen Government Railway (Sentetsu) with 4-6-0 wheel arrangement. The "Teho" name came from the American naming system for steam locomotives, under which locomotives with 4-6-0 wheel arrangement were called "Ten Wheeler".

After the Liberation of Korea, of the 178 surviving locomotives of all Teho classes - including six previously owned by private railway companies - 106 went to the Korean National Railroad in the South, and 72 to the Korean State Railway in the North.

== Description ==
The first large class of 4-6-0 locomotives delivered to Sentetsu was the テホコ (Tehoko) class, which were express locomotives equipped with automatic injectors and other improvements, and which were much larger than the previous Teho classes. The first nine, originally numbered 271–279, were built by ALCo's Schenectady Works in 1917, followed by six copies, numbered 280–285, built in the same year by the South Manchuria Railway's Shahekou Works; Another twelve followed in 1918 from ALCO's Pittsburgh plant, numbered 295–306. Like all Teho-type locomotives operated by Sentetsu, they had driving wheels of 1,680 mm (66 in) and a top speed of 95 km/h (59 mph), and were initially used as mainline passenger power on the Gyeongbu Line; they were later relegated to branchline duties. In the 1938 general renumbering they became テホコ1 through テホコ36. The 27 locomotives on the roster at the time of the 1918 renumbering became 701–727 in that year; the last nine, delivered in 1918–19 from Shahekou, were numbered 728–736. In Sentetsu's general renumbering of 1938 the class was designated テホコ (Tehoko) class, and the locomotives were renumbered テホコ1 through テホコ38.

== Postwar ==
=== Korean National Railroad 터우5 (Teou5) class ===
The exact dispersal of the Tehoko-class locomotives after the partition of Korea in 1945 and the division of Sentetsu assets in 1947 is uncertain, but at least seven went to the South, where the Korean National Railroad designated them 터우5 (Teou5) class and used them until April 1955, when they were replaced by diesel locomotives.

The only surviving Teho type locomotive in South Korea is 터우5-700, on display on a plinth at the entrance of Korail's Human Resources Department. Sentetsu held a commemoration of the 10th anniversary of the re-establishment of the Railway Bureau in Yongsan in 1935, and built 터우5-700 for display there. It was built as a cutaway displaying the internal structure of the locomotive, and it was equipped with a motor to move the driving wheels, which in turn shows the operation of the locomotive's moving parts. After use as a display item it was moved to the Railway University in Yongsan, where it was used as an instructional tool for students, until subsequently being relocated once again to its current location for preservation as part of Korea's railway cultural heritage.

=== Korean State Railway 더우오 (Tŏuo) class ===
Most of the class went to the North after the partition, where they were designated 더우오 (Tŏuo) class by the Korean State Railway, but little is known of their service lives and subsequent fates.

== Construction ==
| Sentetsu running number | | | Postwar | | | | |
| Original | 1918–1938 | 1938–1945 | Owner | Number | Builder | Year | Notes |
|---|---|---|---|---|---|---|---|
| 271 | テホ701 | テホコ1 | ? | ? | ALCo-Schenectady | 1917 | |
| 272 | テホ702 | テホコ2 | ? | ? | ALCo-Schenectady | 1917 | |
| 273 | テホ703 | テホコ3 | ? | ? | ALCo-Schenectady | 1917 | |
| 274 | テホ704 | テホコ4 | ? | ? | ALCo-Schenectady | 1917 | |
| 275 | テホ705 | テホコ5 | ? | ? | ALCo-Schenectady | 1917 | |
| 276 | テホ706 | テホコ6 | ? | ? | ALCo-Schenectady | 1917 | |
| 277 | テホ707 | テホコ7 | ? | ? | ALCo-Schenectady | 1917 | |
| 278 | テホ708 | テホコ8 | ? | ? | ALCo-Schenectady | 1917 | |
| 279 | テホ709 | テホコ9 | ? | ? | ALCo-Schenectady | 1917 | |
| 280 | テホ710 | テホコ10 | KNR | 터우5-10 | Shahekou | 1917 | |
| 281 | テホ711 | テホコ11 | ? | ? | Shahekou | 1917 | |
| 282 | テホ712 | テホコ12 | ? | ? | Shahekou | 1917 | |
| 283 | テホ713 | テホコ13 | KNR | 터우5-13 | Shahekou | 1917 | |
| 284 | テホ714 | テホコ14 | ? | ? | Shahekou | 1917 | |
| 285 | テホ715 | テホコ15 | ? | ? | Shahekou | 1917 | |
| 295 | テホ716 | テホコ16 | ? | ? | ALCo-Pittsburgh | 1918 | |
| 296 | テホ717 | テホコ17 | KNR | 터우5-17 | ALCo-Pittsburgh | 1918 | |
| 297 | テホ718 | テホコ18 | ? | ? | ALCo-Pittsburgh | 1918 | |
| 298 | テホ719 | テホコ19 | KNR | 터우5-19 | ALCo-Pittsburgh | 1918 | |
| 299 | テホ720 | テホコ20 | KNR | 터우5-20 | ALCo-Pittsburgh | 1918 | |
| 300 | テホ721 | テホコ21 | ? | ? | ALCo-Pittsburgh | 1918 | |
| 301 | テホ722 | テホコ22 | ? | ? | ALCo-Pittsburgh | 1918 | |
| 302 | テホ723 | テホコ23 | ? | ? | ALCo-Pittsburgh | 1918 | |
| 303 | テホ724 | テホコ24 | ? | ? | ALCo-Pittsburgh | 1918 | |
| 304 | テホ725 | テホコ25 | ? | ? | ALCo-Pittsburgh | 1918 | |
| 305 | テホ726 | テホコ26 | ? | ? | ALCo-Pittsburgh | 1918 | |
| 306 | テホ727 | テホコ27 | ? | ? | ALCo-Pittsburgh | 1918 | |
| - | テホ728 | テホコ28 | KNR | 터우5-28 | Shahekou | 1918–19 | |
| - | テホ729 | テホコ29 | ? | ? | Shahekou | 1918–19 | |
| - | テホ730 | テホコ30 | ? | ? | Shahekou | 1918–19 | |
| - | テホ731 | テホコ31 | ? | ? | Shahekou | 1918–19 | |
| - | テホ732 | テホコ32 | ? | ? | Shahekou | 1918–19 | |
| - | テホ733 | テホコ33 | KNR | 터우5-33 | Shahekou | 1918–19 | |
| - | テホ734 | テホコ34 | ? | ? | Shahekou | 1918–19 | |
| - | テホ735 | テホコ35 | ? | ? | Shahekou | 1918–19 | |
| - | テホ736 | テホコ36 | ? | ? | Shahekou | 1918–19 | |
| Total | | | | | | | 36 |
