= Sentetsu Tehoi-class locomotive =

4-6-0 steam locomotive

Gyeongbu Railway 300 series Chosen Government Railway Tehoi class (テホイ) Korean National Railroad Teou1 class (터우1) Korean State Railway Tŏuha class (더우하)
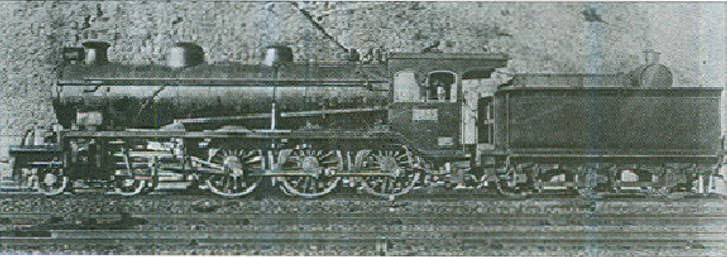
- Gyeongbu Ry locomotive 303 after assembly at the railway's Busan shops in 1906.
Type and origin
- Power type: Steam
- Builder: Baldwin
- Build date: 1906
- Total produced: 6
Specifications
- Configuration
  - Whyte: 4-6-0
- Gauge: 1,435 mm (4 ft 8 1/2 in)
- Driver dia.: 1,680 mm (66 in)
- Length: 18,808 mm (61 ft 8.5 in)
- Width: 2,972 mm (9 ft 9.0 in)
- Height: 4,232 mm (13 ft 10.6 in)
- Loco weight: 78.10 t (76.87 long tons)
- Tender weight: 41.52 t (40.86 long tons)
- Fuel capacity: 4.50 t (4.43 long tons)
- Water cap.: 15,100 L (4,000 US gal)
- Firebox
  - Grate area: 4.36 m^{2} (46.9 sq ft)
- Boiler
  - Small tubes: 233 x 57 mm (2.2 in)
  - Large tubes: 24 x 137 mm (5.4 in)
- Boiler pressure: 14.0 kgf/cm^{2} (199 psi)
- Heating surface
  - Firebox: 11.20 m^{2} (120.6 sq ft)
  - Tubes: 130.90 m^{2} (1,409.0 sq ft)
  - Total surface: 146.30 m^{2} (1,574.8 sq ft)
- Superheater
  - Heating area: 39.60 m^{2} (426.3 sq ft)
- Cylinders: 2
- Cylinder size: 380 mm × 660 mm (15 in × 26 in)
- Valve gear: Stephenson
Performance figures
- Maximum speed: 95 km/h (59 mph)
- Tractive effort: 119.0 kN (26,800 lb_{f})
Career
- Operators: Gyeongbu Railway; Chosen Government Railway; Korean National Railroad; Korean State Railway
- Class: GR: 300 srs Sentetsu: テホイ; KNR: 터우1; KSR: 더우하
- Number in class: 6
- Numbers: GR: 301–306; Sentetsu: テホイ1–テホイ6
- Delivered: 1906
- Data is for 1929 rebuilds.

The Tehoi-class (テホイ) locomotives were a class of steam tender locomotives of the Chosen Government Railway (Sentetsu) with 4-6-0 wheel arrangement. The "Teho" name came from the American naming system for steam locomotives, under which locomotives with 4-6-0 wheel arrangement were called "Ten Wheeler".

After the Liberation of Korea, of the 178 surviving locomotives of all Teho classes - including six previously owned by private railway companies - 106 went to the Korean National Railroad in the South, and 72 to the Korean State Railway in the North.

== Description ==
The テホイ (Tehoi) class was a class of six 4-6-0 Vauclain compound locomotives for mainline use built by the Baldwin Locomotive Works of the United States in 1906, originally for the Gyeongbu Railway, and later operated by the Chosen Government Railway. Like all Teho-type locomotives operated by Sentetsu, they had driving wheels of 1,680 mm (66 in) and a top speed of 95 km/h (59 mph).

=== Gyeongbu Railway 300 series ===
Needing more locomotives for medium-duty passenger operations on both trunk and branch lines, the Gyeongbu Railway once again turned to Baldwin of the United States, ordering a total of twelve 4-6-0 tender locomotives in 1906. Six of these were two-cylinder Vauclain compounds and the other six were single-cylinder locomotives, which were delivered in knockdown form and assembled at the railway's shops in Busan. Numbered 301–306, they were not long in operation with the Gyeongbu Railway, as the company was nationalised in July 1906 and folded into the newly formed National Railway, which became Sentetsu in 1910, in September of that year.

=== Chosen Government Railway テホイ (Tehoi) class ===
After being taken over by Sentetsu, they were put to use on mainline passenger trains, but as more powerful types were introduced, they were gradually relegated to branchline duties and freight trains. In 1918 they were renumbered 601–606, and in 1929 they were rebuilt with superheaters. In Sentetsu's general renumbering of 1938, they were designated テホイ (Tehoi) class and numbered テホイ1 through テホイ6.

== Postwar ==
The exact dispersal of the six Tehoi-class locomotives after the partition of Korea in 1945 and the division of Sentetsu assets in 1947 is uncertain, but at least one went to the South, where the Korean National Railroad designated them 터우1 (Teou1) class. Those that went to the North were designated 더우하 (Tŏuha) class by the Korean State Railway.

== Construction ==
	Sentetsu running number		Postwar				
Original number	1918–1938	1938–1945	Owner	Number	Builder	Year	Notes
301	テホ601	テホイ1	?	?	Baldwin	1906	
302	テホ602	テホイ2	?	?	Baldwin	1906	
303	テホ603	テホイ3	KNR	터우1-3	Baldwin	1906	
304	テホ604	テホイ4	?	?	Baldwin	1906	
305	テホ605	テホイ5	?	?	Baldwin	1906	
306	テホ606	テホイ6	?	?	Baldwin	1906	
Total							6
