= KSR 500 series locomotives =

Class of locomotives

내연500 series
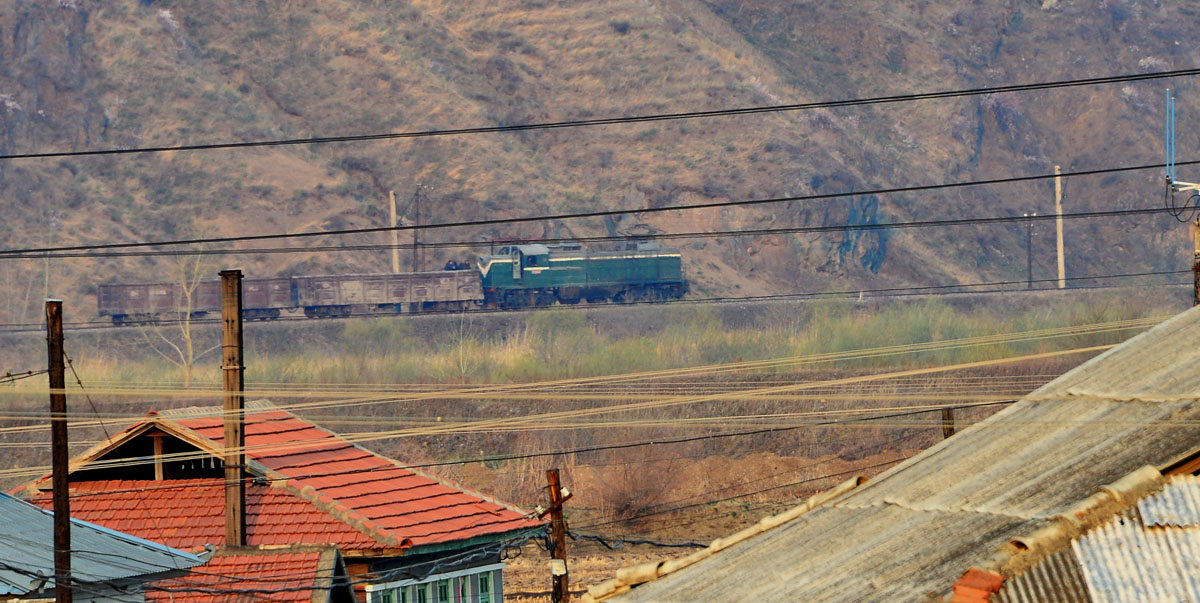
- A TGM3 converted to electric operation on a train on the Hambuk Line.
Type and origin
- Data reflects ТЭМ1 units, the most numerous in the series
- Power type: Diesel-electric
- Builder: Bryansk; Soviet Union
- Build date: 1958-1968
Specifications
- Configuration
  - UIC: Co-Co
- Gauge: 1,435 mm (4 ft 8 1/2 in); 1,520 mm (4 ft 11 27/32 in) Russian gauge
- Wheel diameter: 1,050 mm (3 ft 5 in)
- Wheelbase: 12,800 mm (42 ft 0 in)
- Length: 19,969 mm (65 ft 6.2 in)
- Width: 3.080 mm (0.1213 in)
- Height: 4,643 mm (15 ft 2.8 in)
- Axle load: 21 t (46,000 lb)
- Loco weight: 120 t (260,000 lb)
- Fuel type: Diesel
- Fuel capacity: 5,440 kg (11,990 lb)
- Fuel consumption: 224 g (0.494 lb)/kWh
- Prime mover: 2D50
- RPM range: 740 rpm
- Engine type: 4 stroke straight-6 Diesel engine
- Traction motors: 6 x EDT-200B
- Transmission: Electrical
- Couplers: AAR knuckle
Performance figures
- Maximum speed: 90 km/h (56 mph)
- Power output: 735.5 kW (986.3 hp)
- Tractive effort: 196.1 kN (44,100 lbf)

The 500 series locomotives are a group of diesel-electric and diesel-hydraulic locomotives bought either new or second-hand by the Korean State Railway from the Soviet Union and Russia. The series includes several types of locomotive, all numbered in the 내연5xx range. The exact assignment of running numbers is not known, nor is the total number of units imported - or even all the types included in this series. However, the following are known:

- ТЭМ1 - Diesel-electric. Soviet-made derivative of the American ALCO RSD-1. Around 20 units imported in the early 1990s. 내연569 is operational in the Namp'o area.
- ТЭМ2 - Diesel-electric. Further development of the ТЭМ1. Number imported is not known, but at least two – 내연587 is operational in the P'yŏngyang area in a livery like the ТЭМ1s, and another has been seen painted in the North Korean standard light blue over dark green colours.
- ТГМ3Б - Diesel-hydraulic. Eleven imported new from the USSR in 1972–73. Very similar to the SM15-class of the Polish State Railways. At least one converted to electric operation via pantograph.
- ТГМ4 - Diesel-hydraulic. Two imported new in 1985.
- ТГМ4Б^{Л} - Diesel-hydraulic. Two imported new in 1991.
- ТГМ8Э - Diesel-hydraulic. Export version of ТГМ6, same as JŽ series 744. A total of nine were imported new - 4 in 1986 and 5 in 1990.

Some second hand broad gauge (1,520 mm (4 ft 11 27/32 in) Russian gauge) units are operation around Rajin since the conversion of the Hongŭi Line from Tumangang on the DPRK-Russia border to Hongŭi, and of a section of the Hambuk Line from Hongŭi to Rajin to dual (standard and broad) gauge, completed in 2013.

== Numbering ==
- 내연565 - ТЭМ1
- 내연567 - ТЭМ1
- 내연569 - ТЭМ1
- 내연573 - ТГМ8Э
- 내연587 - ТЭМ2

== Gallery ==
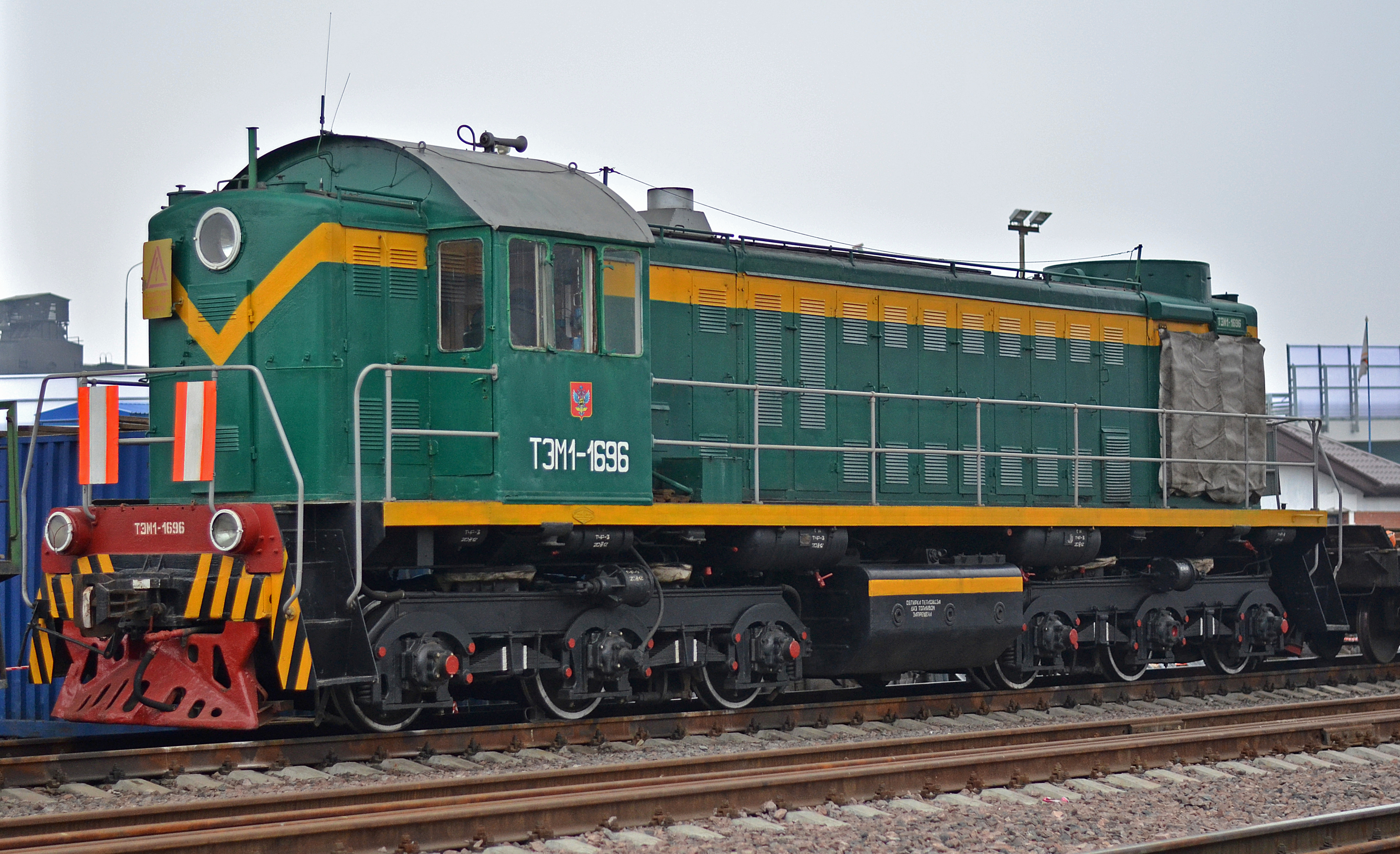
Russian ТЭМ1. Some North Korean units wear the same livery.

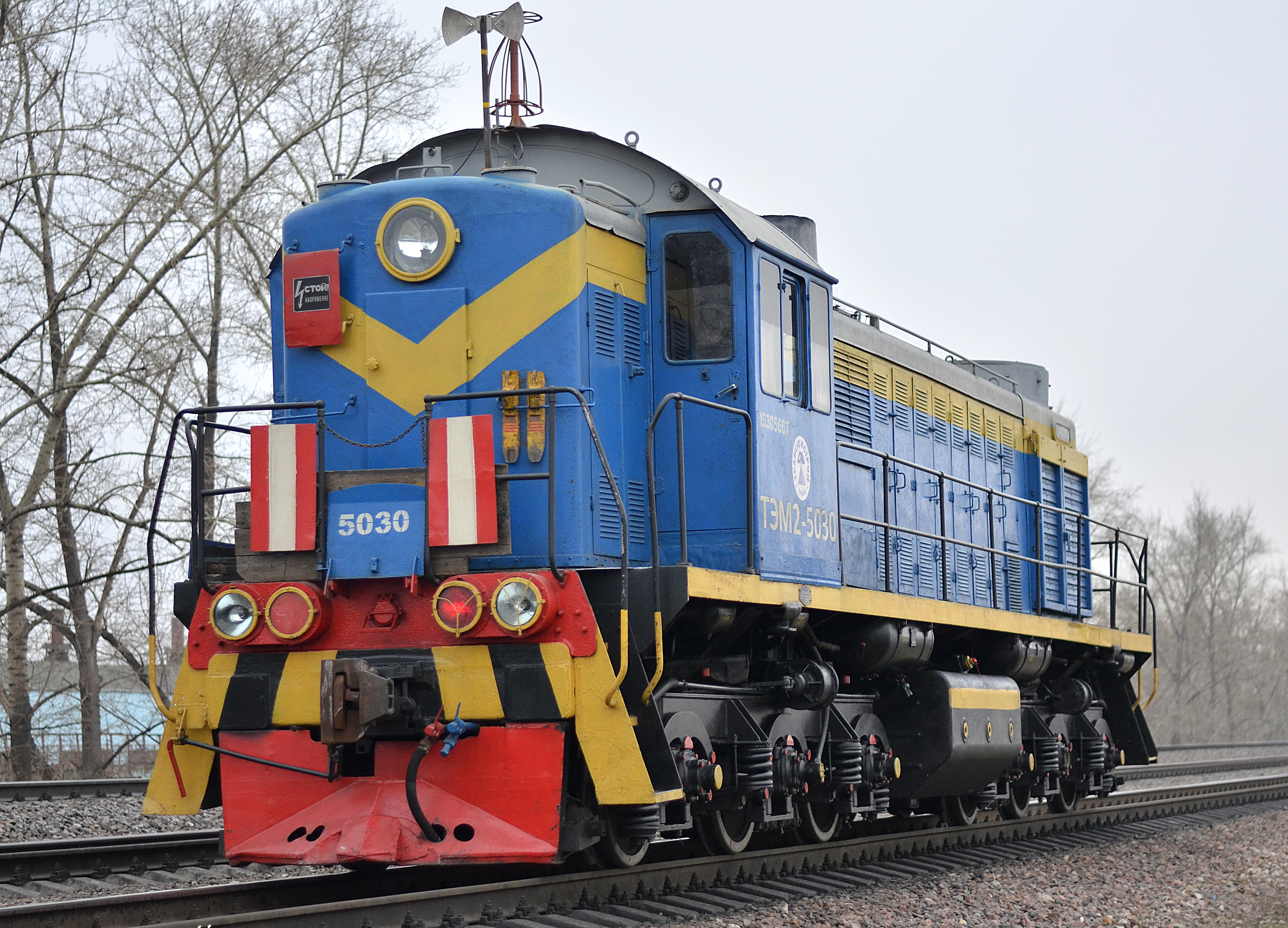
Russian ТЭМ2. Some North Korean units wear the same livery.

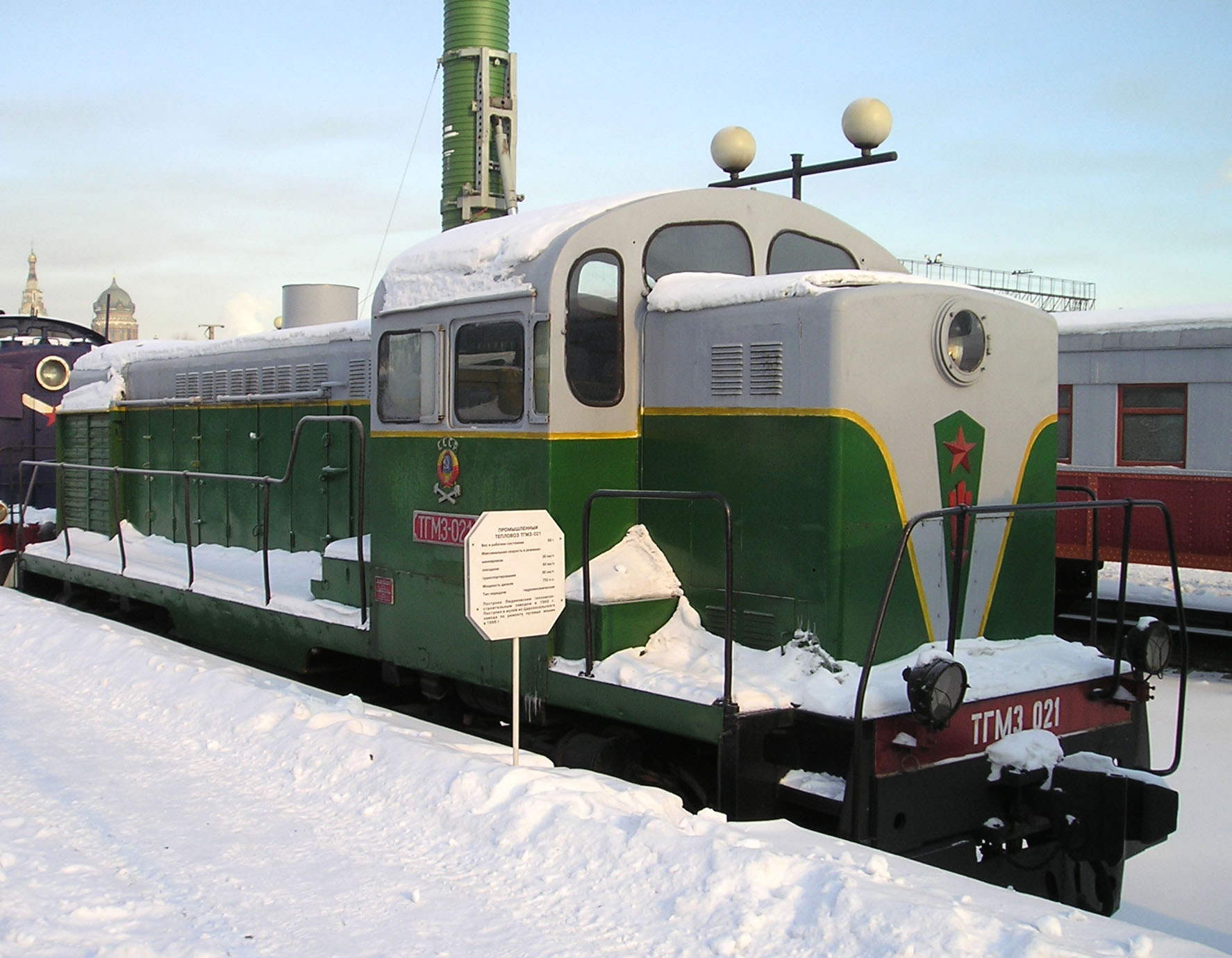
A ТГМ3 of the Soviet Railways.

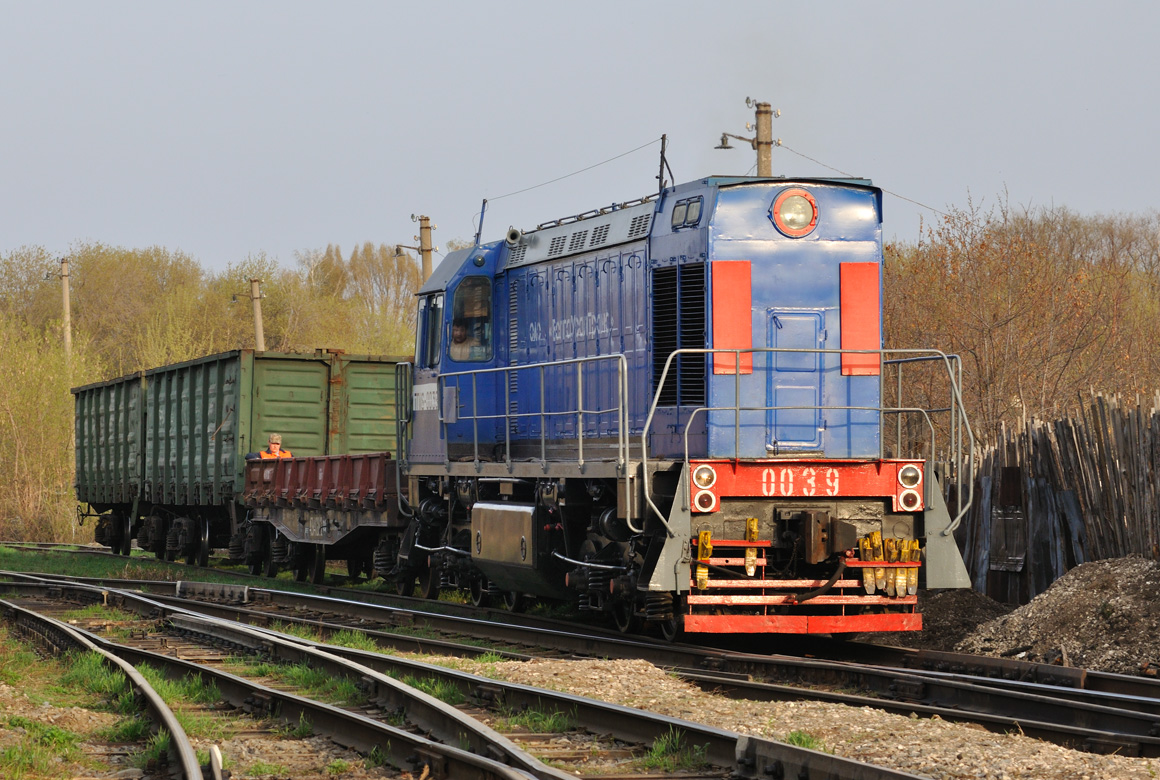
A Russian ТГМ6; the ТГМ8Э is an export variant of this type.
