= Sentetsu Pureshi-class locomotives =

2-6-2 steam locomotive

Chosen Government Railway Pureshi class (プレシ) Korean National Railroad Pureo4 class (푸러4) Korean State Railway Purŏnŏ class (부러너)
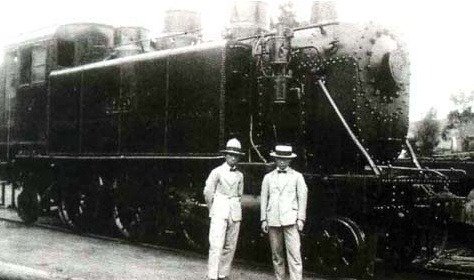
- A Sentetsu Pureshi-class locomotive as rebuilt in 1925.
Type and origin
- Power type: Steam
- Builder: Gyeongseong Works (rebuilder)
- Build date: 1925–
- Total produced: 46
Specifications
- Configuration
  - Whyte: 2-6-2T
- Gauge: 1,435 mm (4 ft 8 1/2 in)
- Driver dia.: 1,370 mm (54 in)
- Length: 10,222 mm (33 ft 6.4 in)
- Width: 2,946 mm (9 ft 8.0 in)
- Height: 4,470 mm (14 ft 8 in)
- Adhesive weight: 38.50 t (37.89 long tons)
- Loco weight: 54.00 t (53.15 long tons)
- Fuel capacity: 2.70 t (2.66 long tons)
- Water cap.: 6,800 L (1,800 US gal)
- Firebox
  - Grate area: 2.74 m^{2} (29.5 sq ft)
- Boiler
  - Small tubes: 173 x 51 mm (2.0 in)
- Boiler pressure: 11.5 kgf/cm^{2} (164 psi)
- Heating surface
  - Firebox: 9.84 m^{2} (105.9 sq ft)
  - Tubes: 91.76 m^{2} (987.7 sq ft)
  - Total surface: 101.60 m^{2} (1,093.6 sq ft)
- Cylinders: 1
- Cylinder size: 410 mm × 610 mm (16 in × 24 in)
- Valve gear: Walschaerts
Performance figures
- Maximum speed: 75 km/h (47 mph)
- Tractive effort: 72.1 kN (16,200 lb_{f})
Career
- Operators: Chosen Government Railway; Korean National Railroad; Korean State Railway
- Class: Sentetsu: プレシ; KNR: 푸러4; KSR: 부러너
- Number in class: Sentetsu: 46
- Numbers: Sentetsu: プレシ1–プレシ46
- Delivered: 1925–

The Pureshi-class (プレシ) locomotives were a group of steam tank locomotives with 2-6-2 wheel arrangement of used by the Chosen Government Railway (Sentetsu) in Korea. The "Pure" name came from the American naming system for steam locomotives, under which locomotives with 2-6-2 wheel arrangement were called "Prairie".

In all, Sentetsu owned 227 locomotives of all Pure classes, whilst privately owned railways owned another 52; of these 279 locomotives, 169 went to the Korean National Railroad in South Korea and 110 to the Korean State Railway in North Korea.

== Description ==
The Pureshi class consisted of 46 Purei-class locomotives rebuilt by Sentetsu's Gyeongseong Works from 1925. Major modifications included increasing the size of the firebox to allow the use of lignite, which has a lower caloric value than anthracite coal. Boiler volume was increased, the heat transfer area was increased, the stoker was enlarged, and special attention was given to the prevention of sparks. The performance was found to be good, and eventually 46 Purei class locomotives were rebuilt to Pureshi standard. The redesign work also gave Sentetsu engineers important experience, which was later applied to the design of the Pashishi and Mikasa-class locomotives. After Sentetsu's general renumbering of 1938 they were numbered プレシ1 through プレシ46.

The original identities of the locomotives rebuilt is unknown.

== Postwar ==
After the Liberation and partition of Korea, the Pureshi-class locomotives were divided between North and South, but the specifics of which engine went where are unclear; those going to the Korean National Railroad in the South would be designated 푸러4 (Pureo4) class, those with the Korean State Railway in the North would be designated 부러너 (Purŏnŏ) class.
