= Sentetsu Tehoni-class locomotive =

4-6-0 steam locomotive

Gyeongbu Railway 200 series Chosen Government Railway Tehoni class (テホニ) Korean National Railroad Teou2 class (터우2) Korean State Railway Tŏudu class (더우두)
Type and origin
- Power type: Steam
- Builder: Baldwin, Brooks
- Build date: 1906–1909
- Total produced: 15 (Baldwin); 6 (Brooks)
Specifications
- Configuration
  - Whyte: 4-6-0
- Gauge: 1,435 mm (4 ft 8 1/2 in)
- Driver dia.: 1,680 mm (66 in)
- Length: 17,765 mm (58 ft 3.4 in)
- Width: 2,972 mm (9 ft 9.0 in)
- Height: 4,232 mm (13 ft 10.6 in)
- Loco weight: 67.16 t (66.10 long tons)
- Tender weight: 41.57 t (40.91 long tons)
- Fuel capacity: 4.50 t (4.43 long tons)
- Water cap.: 15,100 L (4,000 US gal)
- Firebox
  - Grate area: 4.36 m^{2} (46.9 sq ft)
- Boiler
  - Small tubes: 310 x 57 mm (2.2 in)
  - Large tubes: 24 x 137 mm (5.4 in)
- Boiler pressure: 12.6 kgf/cm^{2} (179 psi)
- Heating surface
  - Firebox: 12.00 m^{2} (129.2 sq ft)
  - Tubes: 158.80 m^{2} (1,709.3 sq ft)
  - Total surface: 170.80 m^{2} (1,838.5 sq ft)
- Superheater
  - Heating area: 46.30 m^{2} (498.4 sq ft)
- Cylinders: 1
- Cylinder size: 510 mm × 660 mm (20 in × 26 in)
- Valve gear: Stephenson
Performance figures
- Maximum speed: 95 km/h (59 mph)
- Tractive effort: 111.0 kN (25,000 lb_{f})
Career
- Operators: Gyeongbu Railway; Chosen Government Railway; Korean National Railroad; Korean State Railway
- Class: GR: 200 srs Sentetsu: テホニ; KNR: 터우2; KSR: 더우두
- Number in class: 6
- Numbers: GR: 201–206; Sentetsu: テホニ1–テホニ21
- Delivered: 1906–1909
- Data is for 1929 rebuilds.

The Tehoni-class (テホニ) locomotives were a class of steam tender locomotives of the Chosen Government Railway (Sentetsu) with 4-6-0 wheel arrangement. The "Teho" name came from the American naming system for steam locomotives, under which locomotives with 4-6-0 wheel arrangement were called "Ten Wheeler".

After the Liberation of Korea, of the 178 surviving locomotives of all Teho classes - including six previously owned by private railway companies - 106 went to the Korean National Railroad in the South, and 72 to the Korean State Railway in the North.

== Description ==
The テホニ (Tehoni) class was a class of single-cylinder 4-6-0 locomotives for mainline use built by the Baldwin Locomotive Works and the Brooks Locomotive Works of the United States between 1906 and 1909, originally for the Gyeongbu Railway, and later operated by the Chosen Government Railway. Like all Teho-type locomotives operated by Sentetsu, they had driving wheels of 1,680 mm (66 in) and a top speed of 95 km/h (59 mph).

=== Gyeongbu Railway 200 series ===
Needing more locomotives for medium-duty passenger operations on both main and branchlines, the Gyeongbu Railway once again turned to Baldwin of the United States, ordering a total of twelve 4-6-0 tender locomotives in 1906. Six of these were six were single-cylinder locomotives and the other six were two-cylinder Vauclain compounds which were delivered in knockdown form and assembled at the railway's shops in Busan. Numbered 201–206, they were not long in operation with the Gyeongbu Railway, as the company was nationalised in July 1906 and folded into the newly formed National Railway, which became Sentetsu in 1910, in September of that year.

=== Chosen Government Railway テホニ (Tehoni) class ===
After being taken over by Sentetsu, another nine were delivered from Baldwin in 1908, followed by a further six from Brooks in 1909. They were put to use on mainline passenger trains, but as more powerful types were introduced, they were gradually relegated to branchline duties and freight trains. In 1918 they were renumbered 611–631, and between 1930 and 1935 they were rebuilt with superheaters. In Sentetsu's general renumbering of 1938, they were designated テホニ (Tehoni) class and numbered テホニ1 through テホニ21. This design became the basic pattern followed by subsequent Teho classes.

== Postwar ==
=== Korean National Railroad 터우2 (Teou2) class ===
The exact dispersal of the twenty-one Tehosa-class locomotives after the partition of Korea in 1945 and the division of Sentetsu assets in 1947 is uncertain, but at least nine went to the South, where the Korean National Railroad designated them 터우2 (Teou2) class. They were used by the KNR primarily on local passenger trains and commuter trains.

=== Korean State Railway 더우두 (Tŏudu) class ===
Those that went to the North were designated 더우두 (Tŏudu) class by the Korean State Railway, but little is known of their service lives and subsequent fates.

== Construction ==
	Sentetsu running number		Postwar				
Original number	1918–1938	1938–1945	Owner	Number	Builder	Year	Notes
201	テホ610	テホニ1	?	?	Baldwin	1906	
202	テホ611	テホニ2	KNR	터우2-2	Baldwin	1906	
203	テホ612	テホニ3	?	?	Baldwin	1906	
204	テホ613	テホニ4	KNR	터우2-4	Baldwin	1906	
205	テホ614	テホニ5	?	?	Baldwin	1906	
206	テホ615	テホニ6	KNR	터우2-6	Baldwin	1906	Rebuilt at the Gyeongseong Works in 1933.
207	テホ616	テホニ7	KNR	터우2-7	Baldwin	1908	Derelict by 1953.
208	テホ618	テホニ8	KNR	터우2-8	Baldwin	1908	
209	テホ619	テホニ9	KNR	터우2-9	Baldwin	1908	Derelict by 1954.
210	テホ620	テホニ10	?	?	Baldwin	1908	
211	テホ621	テホニ11	KNR	터우2-11	Baldwin	1908	
212	テホ622	テホニ12	KNR	터우2-12	Baldwin	1908	Rebuilt at the Gyeongseong Works in 1935.
213	テホ623	テホニ13	?	?	Baldwin	1908	
214	テホ624	テホニ14	KNR	터우2-14	Baldwin	1908	
215	テホ625	テホニ15	?	?	Baldwin	1908	
216	テホ626	テホニ16	?	?	Brooks	1909	
217	テホ627	テホニ17	?	?	Brooks	1909	
218	テホ628	テホニ18	?	?	Brooks	1909	
219	テホ629	テホニ19	?	?	Brooks	1909	
220	テホ630	テホニ20	?	?	Brooks	1909	
221	テホ631	テホニ21	?	?	Brooks	1909	
Total							21
