= Sentetsu Purei-class locomotives =

2-6-2 steam locomotive

Chosen Government Railway Purei class (プレイ) Gyeongbu Railway 1–18 Temporary Military Railway 19–52 Korean National Railroad Pureo1 class (푸러1) Korean State Railway Purŏha class (부러하)
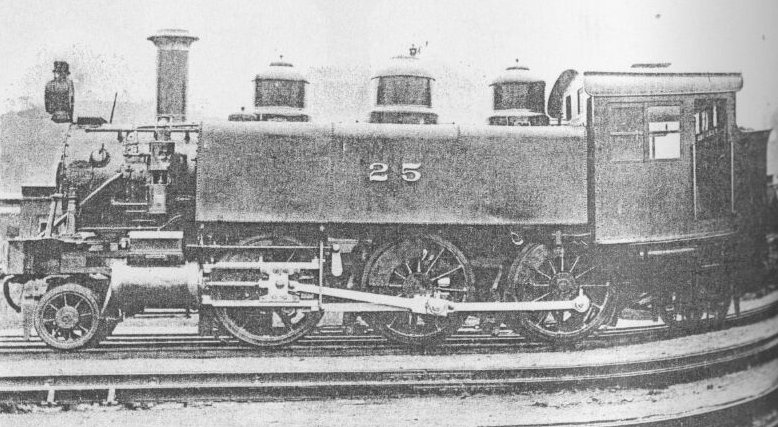
- Sentetsu Purei-class locomotive No. 25
Type and origin
- Power type: Steam
- Builder: Baldwin
- Build date: 1901, 1906
- Total produced: 70
Specifications
- Configuration
  - Whyte: 2-6-2T
- Gauge: 1,435 mm (4 ft 8 1/2 in)
- Driver dia.: 1,370 mm (54 in)
- Length: 10,205 mm (33 ft 5.8 in)
- Width: 2,800 mm (9 ft 2 in)
- Height: 3,860 mm (12 ft 8 in)
- Adhesive weight: 37.00 t (36.42 long tons)
- Loco weight: 52.00 t (51.18 long tons)
- Fuel capacity: 1.8 t (1.8 long tons)
- Water cap.: 5,500 L (1,500 US gal)
- Firebox
  - Grate area: 1.69 m^{2} (18.2 sq ft)
- Boiler
  - Small tubes: 176 x 51 mm (2.0 in)
- Boiler pressure: 11.5 kgf/cm^{2} (164 psi)
- Heating surface
  - Firebox: 9.50 m^{2} (102.3 sq ft)
  - Tubes: 89.20 m^{2} (960.1 sq ft)
  - Total surface: 98.70 m^{2} (1,062.4 sq ft)
- Cylinders: 1
- Cylinder size: 410 mm × 610 mm (16 in × 24 in)
- Valve gear: Stephenson
Performance figures
- Maximum speed: 75 km/h (47 mph)
- Tractive effort: 72.1 kN (16,200 lb_{f})
Career
- Operators: Gyeongbu Railway; Temporary Military Railway; Chosen Government Railway; Korean National Railroad; Korean State Railway
- Class: Sentetsu: プレイ; KNR: 푸러1; KSR: 부러하
- Number in class: GR: 18; TMR: 52; Sentetsu: 70
- Numbers: see text
- Delivered: 1901, 1906

The Purei-class (プレイ) locomotives were a group of steam tank locomotives with 2-6-2 wheel arrangement used by the Chosen Government Railway (Sentetsu) in Korea. The "Pure" name came from the American naming system for steam locomotives, under which locomotives with 2-6-2 wheel arrangement were called "Prairie".

In all, Sentetsu owned 227 locomotives of all Pure classes, whilst privately owned railways owned another 52; of these 279 locomotives, 169 went to the Korean National Railroad in South Korea and 110 to the Korean State Railway in North Korea.

== Description ==
The first 18 Prairie-type locomotives delivered to Korea were built for the Gyeongbu Railway by the Baldwin Locomotive Works of the United States, with the first units arriving in 1901; they were numbered simply 1 through 18. A further 52 were delivered in 1906 to the Temporary Military Railway, of which 48 were assigned to the Gyeongui Line and four to the Masan Line. These were delivered from Baldwin in knockdown form, and were assembled in Korea by the Gyeom-ipo and Incheon Shops.

The Gyeongbu Railway was nationalised to create the Chosen Government Railway on 1 July 1906, and the Temporary Military Railway was absorbed by Sentetsu on 31 August 1906, and all 70 of these locomotives entered service with Sentetsu. Seven were subsequently transferred to private railways, though all but one eventually returned to Sentetsu. They were used by Sentetsu on both passenger and freight trains all over Korea. From 1925, a number were rebuilt to Pureshi class for operation with domestic lignite. 24 Purei-class locomotives remained unrebuilt, and these were numbered 221 through 254. Only 23 were left in service at the time of Sentetsu's 1938 general renumbering; these were renumbered プレイ1 through プレイ23 at that time.

Year	Number	Manufacturer	Original Owner	Notes
1901	18	Baldwin	Gyeongbu Railway	
1905	52	Baldwin	Temporary Military Railway	Assembled in Korea

== Postwar ==
After the Liberation and partition of Korea, they were divided between North and South, but the specifics of which engine went where are unclear.

=== Korean National Railroad 푸러1 (Pureo1) class ===
At least four Purei-class locomotives ended up with the Korean National Railroad in the South after the division of Sentetsu's motive power following the partition of the country; these were designated 푸러1 (Pureo1) class by the KNR.

Known KNR 푸러1-class locomotives
Running number						
KNR	Sentetsu (1938–1945)	Sentetsu (1918–1938)	Original	Builder	Year	Notes
푸러1-11	プレイ11	プレ231	TMR	Baldwin	1906	Operational in 1954
푸러1-14	プレイ14	プレ234	TMR	Baldwin	1906	Derelict by 1953
푸러1-17	プレイ17	プレ237	TMR	Baldwin	1906	Derelict by 1953
푸러1-21	プレイ21	プレ241	TMR	Baldwin	1906	Operational in 1954

=== Korean State Railway 부러하 (Purŏha) class/1100 series ===
The locomotives taken over by the Korean State Railway in the North were initially designated 부러하 (Purŏha) class; they were later renumbered in the 1100 series. The total number, their service lives and subsequent fates are unknown.
