= Red Flag 7-class locomotive =

Class of North Korean electric locomotives

Red Flag 7
Type and origin
- Power type: Electric
- Builder: Kim Chong-t'ae Works; North Korea
Specifications
- Configuration
  - UIC: Bo′Bo′+Bo′Bo′
- Gauge: 1,435 mm (4 ft 8 1/2 in)
- Electric system/s: 3,000 V DC
- Current pickup(s): Pantographs
- Couplers: AAR knuckle
Performance figures
- Maximum speed: 120 km/h (75 mph)
- Power output: 5,418 kW (7,266 hp)
Career
- Operators: (North Korea) Korean State Railway
- Class: 붉은기7 Pulg'ŭn'gi-7
- Number in class: ≥4
- Numbers: 7001-7004

The Red Flag 7-class (Korean: 붉은기7 Pulg'ŭn'gi-7), also known as the Red Flag 2.16 class (붉은기2.16 Pulg'ŭn'gi-2.16) is a two-section, permanently coupled electric locomotive built by the Kim Chong-t'ae Electric Locomotive Works in North Korea and used by the Korean State Railway for heavy freight trains on mountainous lines.

== Description ==
Following the success of the Red Flag 6-class articulated locomotives, the Kim Chong-t'ae Electric Locomotive Works set to the development of a successor in the early 1990s. The new design integrated updated mechanical and electric components, allowing for a maximum speed of 120 km/h with a power output of 5,418 kilowatts (7,266 hp). They are essentially an upgraded, two-part version of the Ch'ŏngnyŏnjŏl Kinyom-class locomotives, which are a locally manufactured derivative of the Francorail-MTE CSE26-21-type diesel locomotives received by the Korean State Railway from France in the 1980s.

The first two prototypes were numbered 7001 and 7002, and both were painted in different variations of a red and yellow livery. Misleadingly, 7001 wore "Red Flag 6" nameplates on the cab ends; 7002, however, carried new nameplates inscribed with the new designation, Red Flag 2.16 class, after the birthdate of Kim Jong-il.

Aside from the two prototypes, locomotives of this class have not yet been noted on rail lines generally seen by foreigners, though two have been seen inside the Kim Chong-t'ae Works plant. 7002 was on display at the Museum of the Three Revolutions in P'yŏngyang for a time, but by the spring of 2007 it had been removed and put into service in the northern part of the country.
