= Songun Red Flag-class locomotive =

Class of North Korean electric locomotives

Sŏngun Red Flag
- Sŏngun Red Flag number 0001 at its rollout ceremony in 2011
Type and origin
- Power type: Electric
- Builder: Kim Chong-t'ae Works; North Korea
- Build date: 2011
Specifications
- Configuration
  - UIC: Bo′Bo′
- Gauge: 1,435 mm (4 ft 8 1/2 in)
- Wheel diameter: 1,250 millimetres (49 in)
- Electric system/s: 3,000 V DC
- Current pickup: Pantographs
- Loco brake: Disc brakes
- Train brakes: Air
- Couplers: AAR knuckle
Performance figures
- Maximum speed: 140 km/h (87 mph) continuous: 70km/h
- Power output
  - Starting: 4,200 kW (5,600 hp)
  - Continuous: 2,000 kW (2,700 hp)
Career
- Operators: (North Korea) Korean State Railway
- Class: 선군붉은기; Sŏngun Red Flag
- Number in class: ≥3
- Numbers: 0001-0002; 4071+

The Sŏngun Red Flag (Korean: 선군붉은기, Sŏngun Pulg'ŭn'gi) class is a group of electric locomotives manufactured by the Kim Chong-t'ae Electric Locomotive Works for the Korean State Railway.

== Description ==
On 5 January 2011, the Korean Central News Agency announced that an unveiling ceremony had taken place for a new electric locomotive built by the Kim Chong-t'ae locomotive factory for the Korean State Railway. The primary design goal was to create a locomotive that produces higher power output with lower power usage.

Given the Sŏngun Red Flag class name by Kim Jong Il (much like the prototype of the Red Flag 1 locomotive was given its name by Kim Il Sung), the new locomotive is the first to be built in North Korea with asynchronous motors. Intended for use on freight trains in mountainous areas, it has a continuous power output of 2,000 kilowatts (2,700 hp), resulting in a tractive effort nearly 1.5 times that of the Red Flag 1 class, while consuming 50% less power.

The twin-cab body rides on two two-axle, self-steering bogies with a computerised braking system. It is equipped with a computerised operation control system with four LCD screens in each cab. Although the KCNA report claimed that this was developed domestically, the control system is made by CNR Dalian in China. This is also the case with the asynchronous motors, which are Chinese-made Xiangyang induction motors.

Numbered in the 0000 series, the prototype was painted in a special red and blue paint scheme, but production versions are painted in a variant of the new standard light green over dark green livery; this also differs from the prototype in some details, such as the fluting on the sides and the shape of the upper headlamp. At least one production unit has been seen numbered in the 4000 series (4071); this series is allotted to the Ch'ŏngnyŏnjŏl Kinyŏm-class class, although the highest known number assigned to one of those locomotives is 4056; this could mean that production units are now being numbered from 4070. The prototype has been used for a number of special events, including a ceremony in which Kim Jong Il inspected the prototype, saying that "production of modern railway vehicles is important to our railway modernisation policy." and the opening of the Songdowŏn Line on 23 September 2014 was marked by a special inaugural train pulled by the prototype. One of the production locomotives has been deployed to the Sinuiju Locomotive Brigade.
