= Kŭmsŏng-class locomotive =

Class of North Korean diesel locomotive

Kŭmsŏng 금성
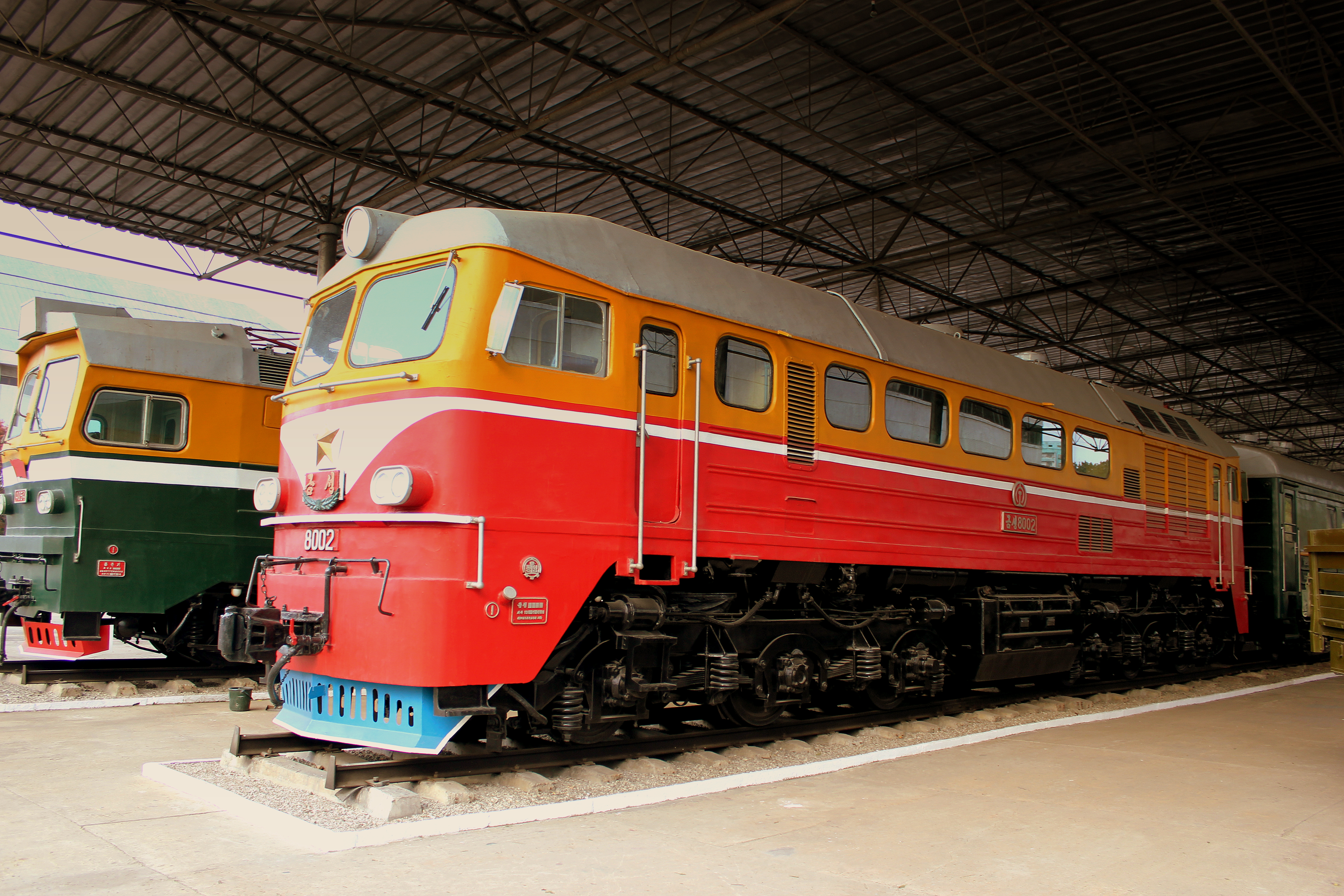
- 금성8002 on display at the 3 Revolutions Museum.
Type and origin
- Power type: Diesel-electric
- Builder: Kim Chong-t'ae Works; North Korea
- Build date: 1970s
- Total produced: at least 4
Specifications
- Configuration
  - UIC: Co′Co′
- Gauge: 1,435 mm (4 ft 8 1/2 in) standard gauge
- Wheel diameter: 1,050 mm (41.34 in)
- Length: 18,076 mm (59 ft 3.7 in)
- Width: 2,954 mm (9 ft 8.3 in)
- Height: 4,615 mm (15 ft 1.7 in)*
- Loco weight: 123 tons
- Fuel type: diesel
- Prime mover: DPRK copy of Kolomna 14D40
- RPM
  - Maximum RPM: 2290
- Engine type: V12 diesel
- Traction motors
  - Rating 1 hour: 2230-4200 A
- Cylinders: 12
- Transmission: Electric
- Loco brake: air
Performance figures
- Maximum speed: 100 km/h (62 mph)
- Power output
  - Starting: 2,500 metric horsepower (1,800 kW)
  - Continuous: 2,200 metric horsepower (1,600 kW)
Career
- Operators: (North Korea) Korean State Railway
- Number in class: ≥2
- Numbers: 금성8001, 금성8002
- * - dimensions of original M62, data partially from Foreign Trade of the DPRK brochure

The Kŭmsŏng class (Korean: 금성, "Gold Star") locomotives are an unlicensed copy of the Soviet-made M62-type diesel locomotive, built by the Kim Chong-t'ae Electric Locomotive Works in P'yŏngyang, North Korea.

== Description ==
Starting in 1967, the Voroshilovgrad Locomotive Factory in Voroshilovgrad, USSR (now Luhansk, Ukraine), began production of 64 K62-class variants of the M62 for the Korean State Railway. The Kim Chong-t'ae works subsequently reverse-engineered these locomotives, along with their diesel engines and other components imported from the USSR. These efforts led to the production of the Kŭmsŏng class locomotives using both copied components and Russian-made parts.

In testing, the first prototype, numbered 8001, the goal of attaining a maximum speed of 100 km/h (62 mph) was achieved, and the copy of the Kolomna 14D40 engine produced 1,470 kW (1,970 hp). However, reliability issues prevented mass production. The second unit, 8002, has been on display at the Three Revolutions Exhibition in P'yŏngyang since it was built. The first two units were both painted in a yellow and red livery, strikingly different from the blue and green scheme applied to the Soviet-made versions. 8001 is in service, pulling trains on the P'yŏngŭi Line.

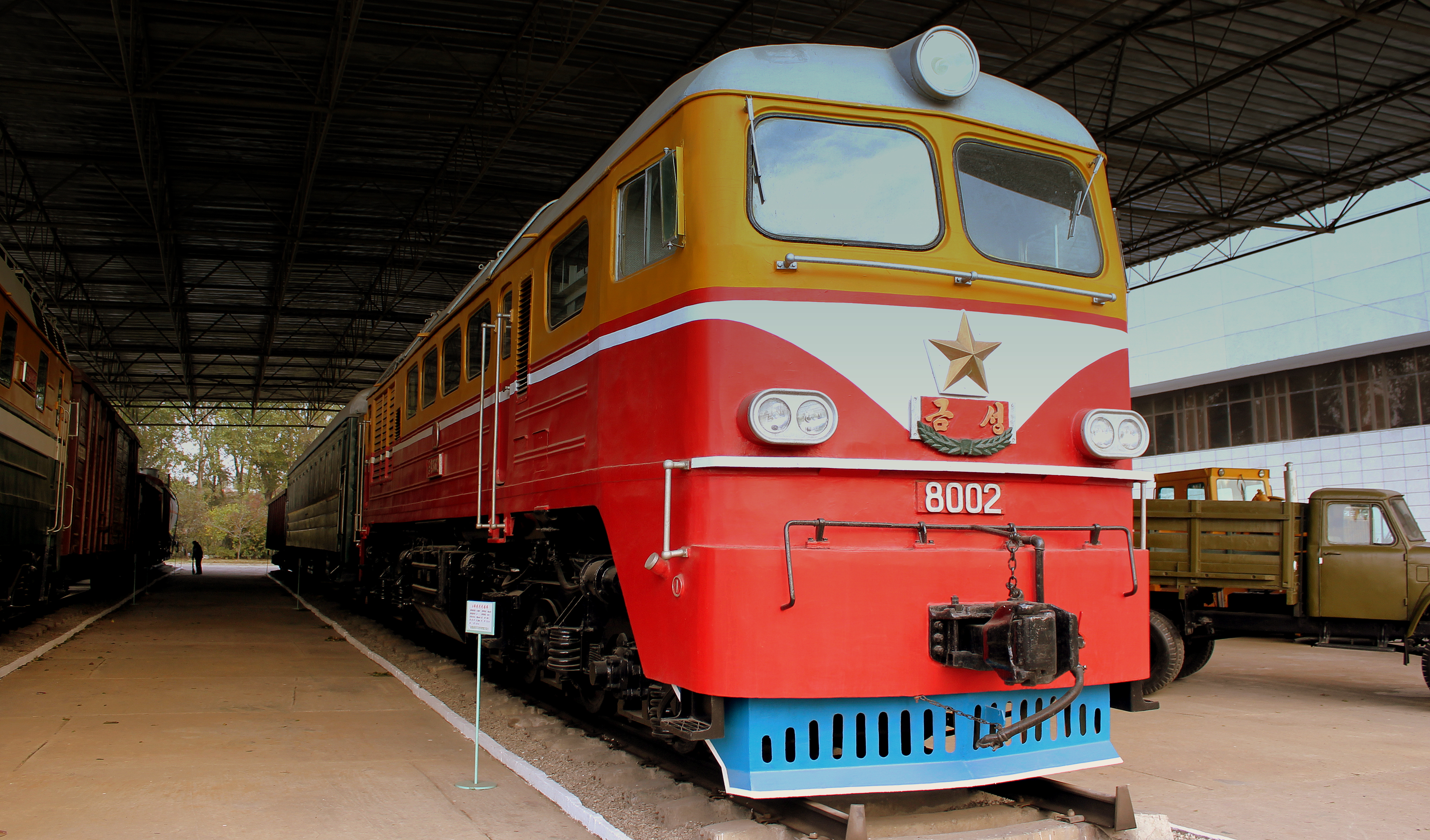
Another view of Kŭmsŏng 8002.

There are a number of noticeable external differences between the Kŭmsŏng class locomotives and the Soviet-built M62s. The most immediately evident is the number and arrangement of the side windows, and the shape of the cab windows. Also very different are the headlights: the top light is round on the Kŭmsŏng instead of rectangular, and the main headlights are mounted in pairs, and higher up, than on the M62. Another readily noticeable difference is that the bogie frames are constructed with welded steel profiles.

== Conversions to electric ==
Like the M62, some Kŭmsŏng class locomotives have also been converted to Kanghaenggun-class electric locomotives. Two have been seen so far - #0309 in dark green and white, and #399 in dark blue and white, but it is not known whether these were converted from existing Kŭmsŏng class locomotives originally built as diesels, or if the electrics use newly built bodies.
