= Chongnyonjol Kinyom-class locomotive =

Class of North Korean electric locomotives

Ch'ŏngnyŏnjŏl Kinyŏm
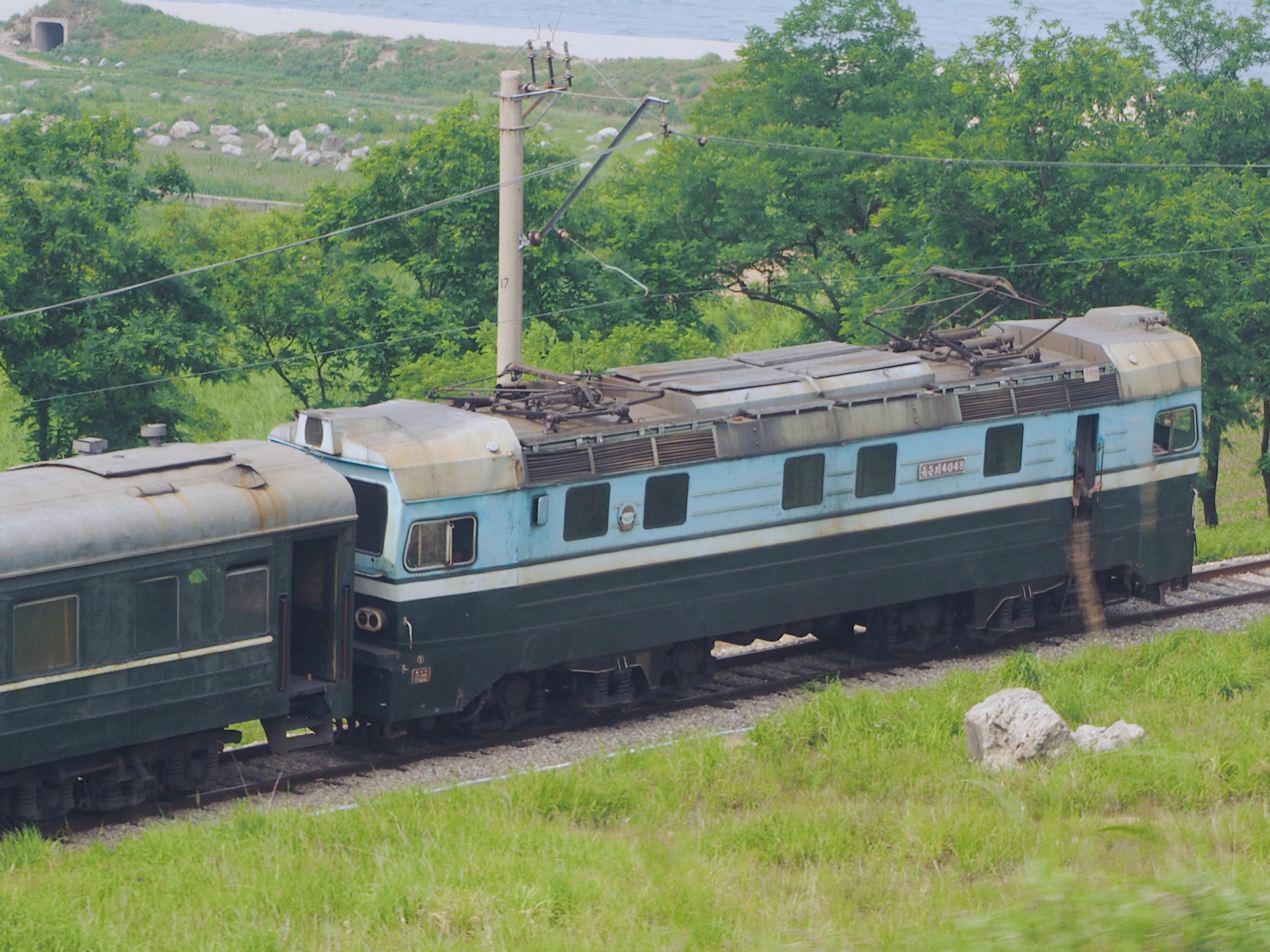
- #4048 on the Kŭmgangsan Ch'ŏngnyŏn line
Type and origin
- Power type: Electric
- Builder: Kim Chong-t'ae Works; North Korea
Specifications
- Configuration
  - UIC: Bo-Bo
- Gauge: 1,435 mm (4 ft 8 1/2 in)
- Electric system/s: 3,000 V DC
- Current pickup(s): Pantographs
- Couplers: AAR knuckle
Career
- Operators: (North Korea) Korean State Railway
- Class: 청년절기념; Ch'ŏngnyŏnjŏl Kinyŏm
- Number in class: ≥56 (4000 srs) ≥7 (90000 srs)
- Numbers: 붉은기4001 - 붉은기4056 붉은기90001 - 붉은기90007

The Ch'ŏngnyŏnjŏl Kinyŏm-class (Korean: 청년절기념, "Youth Day Memorial") is composed of two groups of Bo-Bo electric locomotives operated by the Korean State Railway on passenger and freight trains throughout North Korea.

In 1981, the Korean State Railway took delivery of seven Francorail-MTE CSE26-21 diesel locomotives from France, followed by five more in 1985. Due to oil shortages in the late 1980s and early 1990s, it was decided to convert these locomotives to 3,000 V DC electric operation, by removing the diesel engines and installing pantographs and other necessary electrical equipment; this work was carried out by the Kim Chong-t'ae Electric Locomotive Works in P'yŏngyang. The result of this were the prototypes of the 5400-series Red Flag Co-Co locomotives.

The Ch'ŏngnyŏnjŏl Kinyŏm-class locomotives have a body and chassis design derived from that of the CSE26-21, but other component, such as the bogies, are identical to those used on earlier Bo-Bo locomotives such as the Red Flag 2000-class. Two versions, externally nearly identical, have been built - the 4000 series, and the 90000 series.

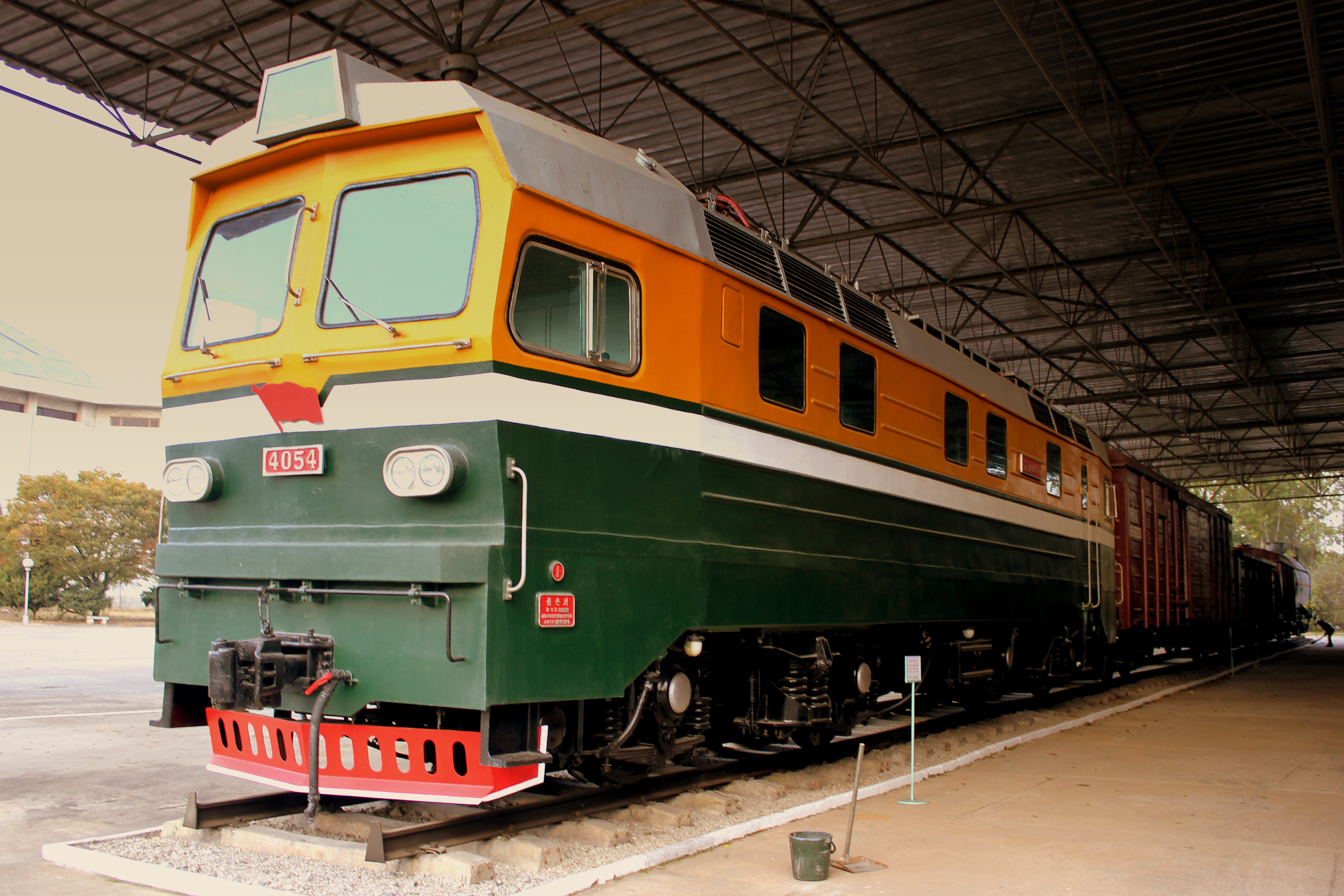
4054 on display at the 3 Revolutions Museum

At least 56 units of the 4000 series locomotives were built, and are used primarily for freight trains on mainlines; however, they do occasionally turn up on passenger trains. Most are painted in the standard light blue over dark green livery or its newer variant that replaces the light blue with light green, but some are painted cream over red; two units, 4020 and 4022, has been seen carrying a special "Kŭmgang-ho" (금강호, "Kŭmgang-class) inscription. One example, number 4054, is painted in a unique yellow over green livery, and has been on display at the Museum of the Three Revolutions in P'yŏngyang since it was built.

At least seven examples of the 90000 series are operated primarily as traction for mainline passenger trains, painted in the standard light blue over dark green livery.

A narrow-gauge version has also been built to operate on the Korean State Railway's electrified 762 mm (2 ft 6 in) gauge lines, painted in a yellow and red scheme, but neither the designation, series number or number built are known.
