= K62-class locomotive =

Class of North Korean diesel locomotive

K62 - Sinsŏng K62 - 신성
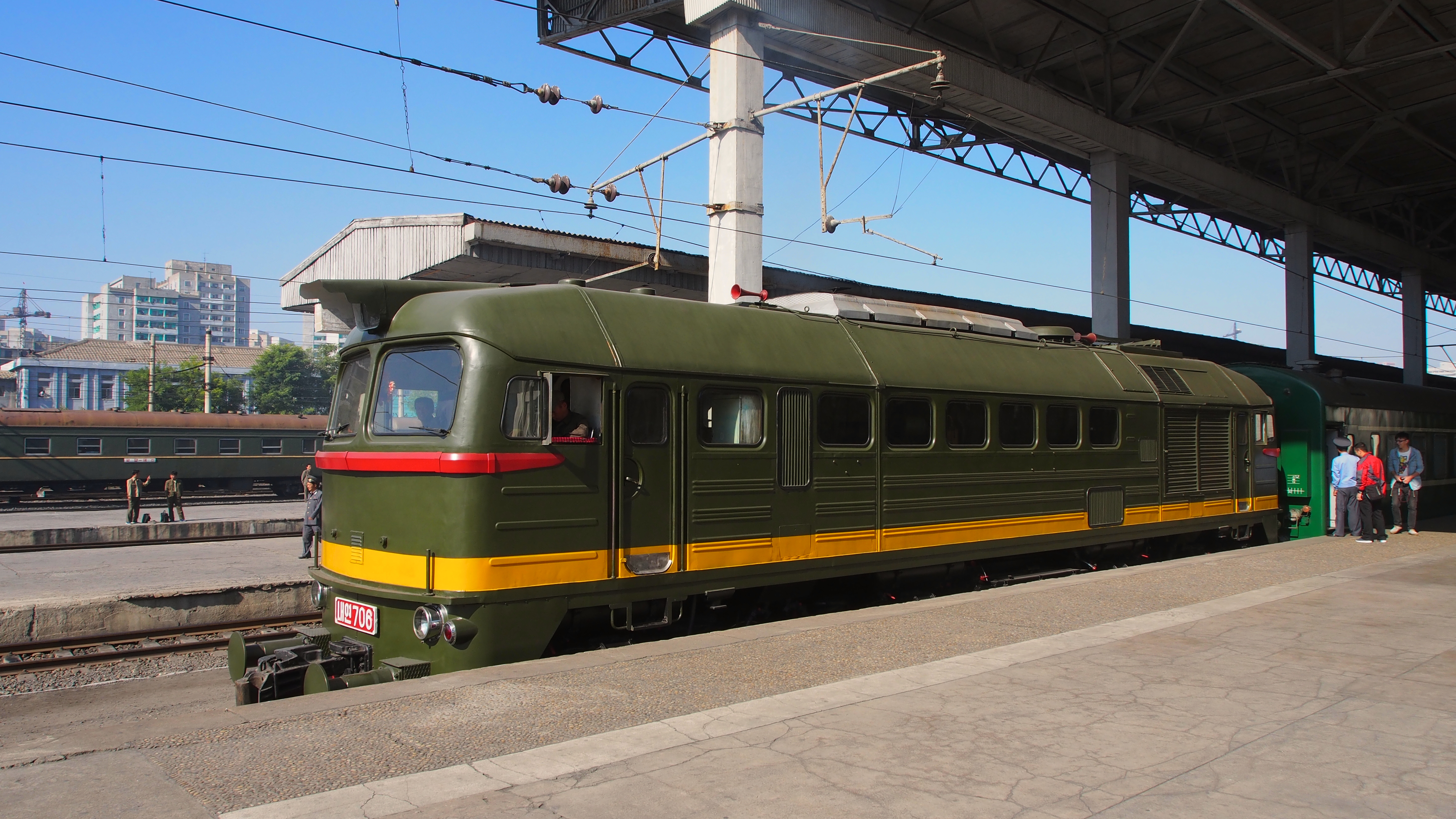
- 내연706, an ex-German unit, at P'yŏngyang
Type and origin
- Power type: Diesel-electric
- Builder: Voroshilovgrad; Soviet Union
- Model: K62
- Build date: 1967-69 (48), 1972-74 (11 std gauge), 1973 (5 broad gauge)
- Total produced: 64 (new)
Specifications
- Configuration
  - UIC: Co′Co′
- Gauge: 1,435 mm (4 ft 8 1/2 in) standard gauge 1,520 mm (4 ft 11 27/32 in) Russian gauge
- Driver dia.: 1,050 mm (41.34 in)
- Minimum curve: 125 m (410 ft 1 in)
- Wheelbase: 12,800 mm (42 ft 0 in)
  - Bogie: 4,200 mm (13 ft 9 in)
- Pivot centres: 8,600 mm (28 ft 3 in)
- Length: 17,550 mm (57 ft 7 in)
- Width: 2,950 mm (9 ft 8 in)
- Height: 4,615 mm (15 ft 1.7 in)
- Axle load: 19.4 t (19.1 long tons; 21.4 short tons)
- Loco weight: 116.5 t (114.7 long tons; 128.4 short tons)
- Fuel type: diesel
- Fuel capacity: 3,390 L (900 US gal)
- Lubricant cap.: 950 L (250 US gal)
- Water cap.: 950 L (250 US gal)
- Sandbox cap.: 600 kg (1,300 lb)
- Fuel consumption: 340 kg/h (750 lb/h)
- Prime mover: Kolomna 14D40
- Engine type: V12 diesel
- Generator: GP-312
- Traction motors: 6 x ED-107 (pre-1973); ED-118A (post-1973)
  - Continuous: 6 x 192 kW (257 hp)
- Cylinders: 12
- Cylinder size: 230 mm × 300 mm (9.1 in × 11.8 in)
- Transmission: Electric
- Gear ratio: 75:17=4.412
- Loco brake: Oerlikon air brake
Performance figures
- Maximum speed: 100 km/h (62 mph)
- Power output: 1,472 kW (1,974 hp)
- Tractive effort: 314 kN (71,000 lb_{f})
Career
- Operators: (North Korea) Korean State Railway
- Numbers: 내연601-665 내연701-744 내연855-873 +

K62 class is the Voroshilovgrad Locomotive Factory's designation for M62-type diesel locomotives built for the Korean State Railway. In North Korean service, they are designated Sinsŏng-class Korean: 신성, "Nova".

== Overview ==
The M62 type was one of the most important types of diesel locomotive in the Comecon countries, with over 5,000 units being built for the railways of the Eastern Bloc, Cuba, Mongolia and North Korea. Initially designed to meet a requirement of the Hungarian State Railways, the reliability and the durability of the type helped it become a mainstay of many railways in the former Communist bloc. As it had done for many of those countries, the arrival of the M62 - or K62, as the units built for North Korea were designated at the factory - helped North Korea to significantly reduce its use of steam locomotives for mainline operations, and they played an important role in the DPRK's economic improvements of the 1960s.

Aside from the "K62" designation given by the factory, the Korean State Railway gave the type a unique class name as well: Sinsŏng. The class name, when written in Hanja, is 新星. In this case, these hanja are read as sinsŏng; however, there is a class of domestically built diesel shunters whose class name is written with the same hanja: the Saebyŏl-class (새별, "New Star"). In practice this is not an issue, as the use of Chinese characters to write Korean is officially discouraged in the DPRK.

Although many types of diesel locomotive have been operated by the Korean State Railway over the years, the most important, in terms of both quantity and scale of operations, has been the K62-class, of which 64 units were built new for North Korea. These were built in two batches, the first being constructed between 1967 and 1969 (48 units), and the second batch of 16 between 1972 and 1974. Of the second batch, five were delivered in 1973 with 1,520 mm (4 ft 11 27/32 in) Russian gauge trucks for service on the Soviet-DPRK border at Tumangang.

Though plans were made to obtain 2M62-type two-unit versions of the M62, this ultimately failed to materialise; however, at least one twin-unit was delivered, whose remains have been seen, gutted and split in half - one section in P'yŏngyang, the other south of Mulgae on the P'yŏngbu Line to Kaesŏng.

In the early 1970s, the Kim Chong-t'ae Electric Locomotive Works reverse-engineered a Soviet-built M62. This led to the production of the Kŭmsong-class copies.

In 1998, the Kim Chong-t'ae Works began a project to convert M62s to electric operation, resulting in the Kanghaenggun-class electric locomotives. 21 Soviet-built M62s have been converted thus far, along with two of the Kim Chong-tae Works-built copies. These are used widely on lines such as the P'yŏngŭi and P'yŏngnam lines. The identities of the locomotives thus converted is unclear for the most part, but 632 is known to have been rebuilt into electric number 1.5-13.

The K62 class has been the backbone of diesel power on North Korea's railways for many years, being used all over the country, including on electrified lines. Because of their reliability and the crews' familiarity with the type, between 1996 and 2000 second-hand M62-type locomotives were bought from various countries. These locomotives were brought in from Russia, Germany, Poland and Slovakia, and were numbered variously in the 600, 700 and 800 series ranges. The locomotives purchased from Germany, Poland and Slovakia retain their European-style buffers, although the European couplers have been replaced with the Janney (AAR-type) knuckle coupler used by the Korean State Railway.

== 600 Series ==
This series, numbers 내연601 to 내연665 is made up of the 64 units delivered new to North Korea from the factory, as well as one unit obtained second-hand from the Polish State Railways (내연665). 내연656 (works number 1384, built 1971), although built for the Korean State Railway, wasn't delivered immediately, instead having served for some years with Soviet Railways, assigned to the Lvov region as M62-1265. Some of the units originally built for the DPRK have since been retrofitted with exhaust silencers.

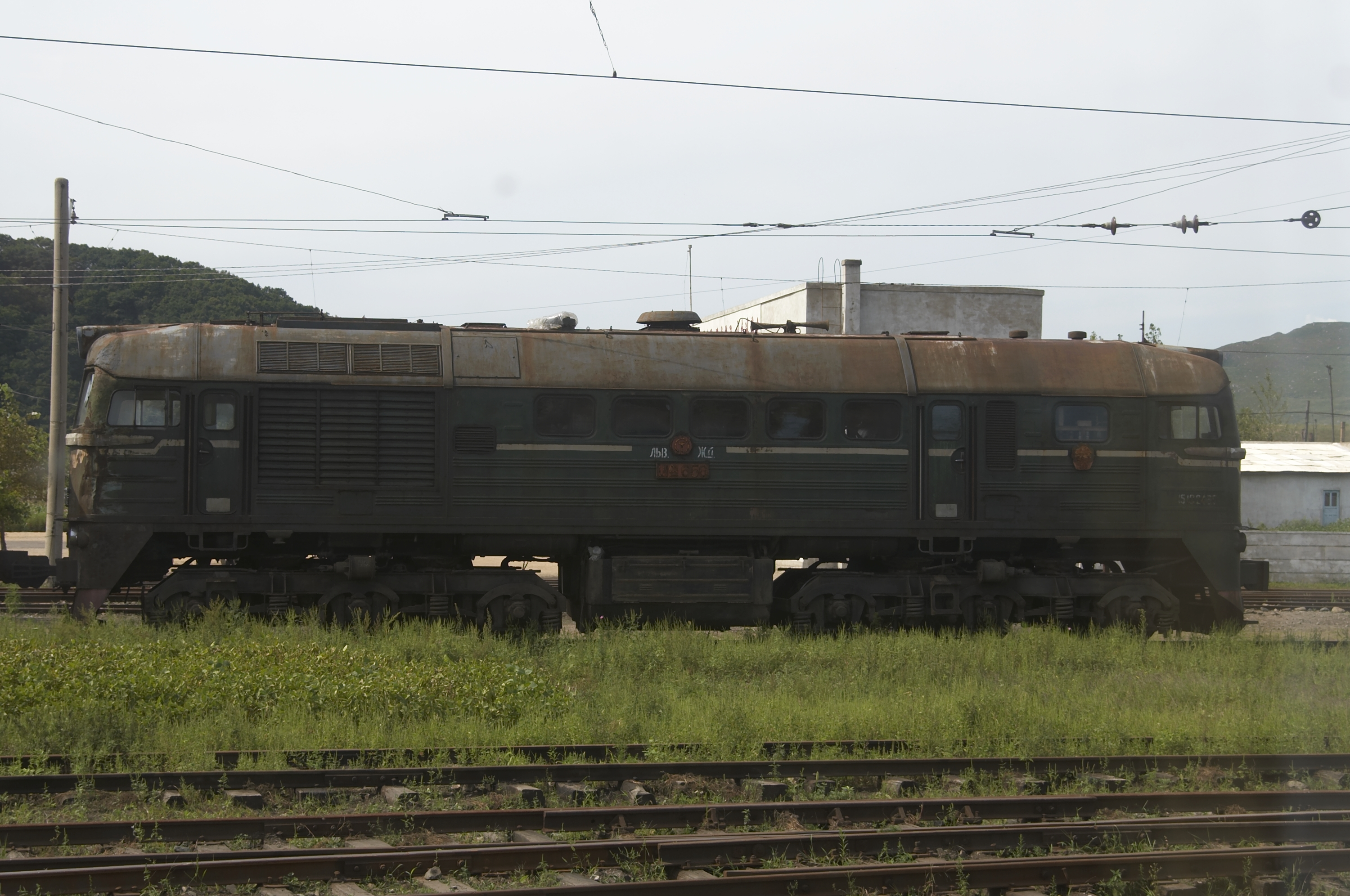
내연656 - built for North Korea, but served in the USSR for some years before being delivered. Here the Russian lettering is still visible.

Some units of this series are being modernised, which includes the replacement of the original Kolomna 14D4 engine. The modernisation package includes replacement of the original engine with the new Kolomna 12ChN26/26 engine, and of the original 4-14DG generator with the new 5-26DG. These have a much lower fuel consumption than the originals, and can go longer before overhaul is required. In 2000, 내연604 was sent back to Luhanskteplovozstroi to undergo this modernisation, at which time it received a new blue and white livery similar to that used by the Russian Railways. Additionally, it received new headlights like those found on the Russian DM62 and M62U variants.

Since 2006, the new 12ChN26/26 engines and 5-26DG generators have been delivered to North Korea, the modernisations now taking place in domestic shops. So far, 내연602 - the machine inspected by Kim Il Sung and which carries plaques commemorating the occasion - is known to have been modernised. Locomotive 602 also has the distinction of having been the first North Korean locomotive to cross the Korean Demilitarized Zone since the end of the Korean War.

Almost all locomotives of the 600 series are painted in the standard blue over dark green livery, although there are a few exceptions. 604, as mentioned, was repainted into a blue and white scheme used by the Russian Railways. Several, including 622, 639 and 658 are painted in a scheme becoming more common, which replaces the blue in the standard livery with light green. 629 is overall dark green with a white stripe, and, as mentioned above, 656 still carries its Soviet paint and even lettering, while 653 has been repainted into the green and yellow scheme used on the 700 series locomotives. The one locomotive in this series that wasn't ordered new, 665, is one of the very few second-hand units that received the standard blue over green livery.

Known to be assigned to P'yŏngyang Depot are 602, 619, 620, 622, 625, 627, 638, 650, and 664.

One locomotive was rebuilt, likely after an accident, with new cabs similar to those on the Red Flag 6-class electrics locomotive, but with dual headlamps; this is numbered 내연001 and is painted in the standard livery.

== 700 Series ==
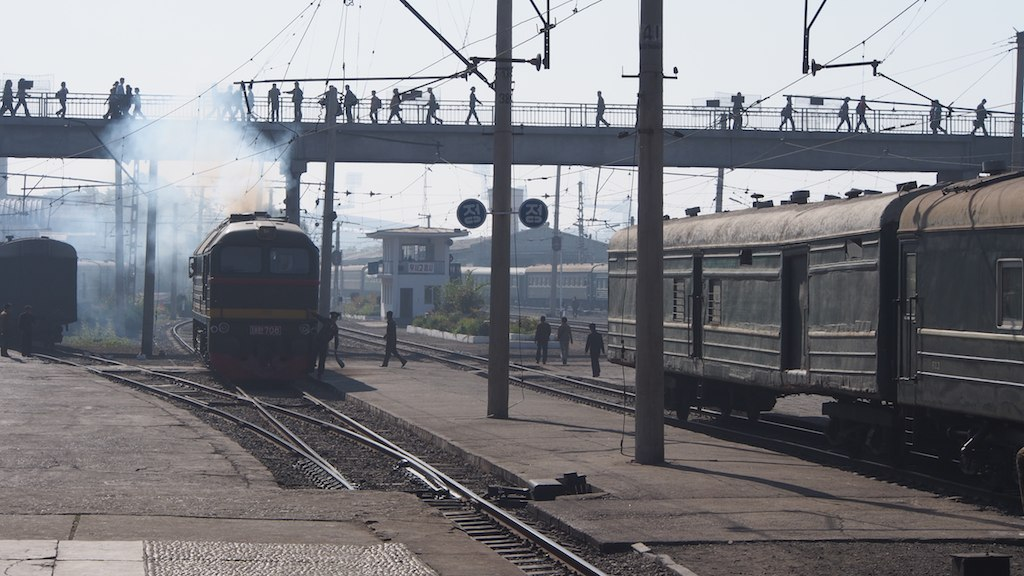
A 700-series locomotive, bought second-hand from Germany, working at P'yŏngyang Station on 5 October 2013.

In the 1990s, the Korean State Railways obtained some M62s from Russia for parts, as well as attrition replacements, one of which was partially repainted into standard light blue over dark green (keeping the distinctive striping of the original Russian scheme, and even the original Russian number plates on the ends) and was assigned the number 646 - this is a number originally assigned to one of the 64 units delivered new. Starting in the mid-1990s, the Korean State Railways began buying M62s second-hand from former Communist countries to put into service.

The first such purchase came from Germany, which saw a total of 31 units shipped from the stock of the former East German Deutsche Reichsbahn between 1996 and 1998 - six in 1996, fourteen in 1997 in three shipments, and eleven in 1998 in at least two shipments:

- 21 December 1996 - 220 048–3, 220 219–0, 220 289–3, 220 292–7, 220 318–0, 220 322–2;
- 22 April 1997 - 220 043–4, 220 234–9, 220 290–1, 220 335–4, 220–345–3, 220 367–7;
- 19 November 1997 - 220 371–9, 220 372–7, 220 375–0
- 20 November 1997 - 220 114–3, 220 211–7, 220 296–8, 220 317–2, 220 332–2
- 11 March 1998 - 220 008–7, 220 180–4, 220 305–7, 220 319–3
- 1998 - 220 086–3, 220 087–1, 220 119–2, 220 159–8, 220 334–7, 220 342–0, 220 362–8

In 2000, a total of 13 units were received from the Polish State Railways, shipped in two batches:

- 8 May 2000 - ST44 103 (w/n 1970/830), ST44 152 (1968/519), ST44 325 (1971/1166), ST44 518 (1976/2497), ST44 649 (1977/????), ST44 673 (77/2912)
- 1 October 2000: ST44 72, ST44 549, ST44 840, ST44 929, ST44 937, ST44 947, ST44 999

All of the locomotives in the 700 series have been repainted into overall green with a yellow stripe (arranged the same was as the previous DR livery of burgundy red with a white stripe).

Known to be assigned to P'yŏngyang Depot is 715.

The origins of the following units are known:

- 내연701 ex-DR
- 내연705 ex-DR
- 내연706 ex-DR
- 내연707 ex-DR
- 내연719 ex-DR
- 내연720 ex-DR
- 내연728 ex-PKP
- 내연738 ex-PKP
- 내연742 ex-PKP
- 내연743 ex-PKP
- 내연744 ex-ŽSR

== 800 Series ==
For reasons unknown, two of the 13 M62s bought from Poland, the nine bought from Slovakia and those bought from Russia - new or second-hand - are grouped together in the 내연800 series. The lowest number seen thus far is 내연855. The reason for the seeming gap is not known, but it is possible that the many units obtained from Russia for use as parts stores were given numbers in the lower end of the range for inventory purposes.

A total of nine units were received from the Slovak Republic Railways in 2000, delivered in two batches:

- 8 May 2000: 781 826 (ex 781 317; w/n 1971/1191), 781 827 (ex 781 281; 1970/905), 781 828 (ex 781 373; 1971/1247)
- 1 October 2000: 3 unidentified units.

Their new numbers are not known, but the dark red livery still carried by some of these machines give their origins away.

Nineteen of the units delivered from Russia are known to have entered operational use. These are likewise numbered in the 8xx series, grouped together indiscriminately with the machines bought from Slovakia and Poland.

Of these, fifteen were delivered second-hand in 1989, all from the Lvov Division of the Soviet Railways, all M62S type; M62S is the designation for those locomotives originally built for the Soviet Railways of the original M62 design. These are:

- July 1989: M62-1005 (w/n 0933, 1970), M62-1008 (w/n 0936, 1970), M62-1011 (wn 0939, 1970), M62-1077 (w/n 1030, 1970);
- August 1989: M62-1101 (w/n 1054, 1970), M62-1102 (w/n 1055, 1970);
- September 1989: M62-1187 (w/n 1301, 1971), M62-1189 (w/n 1303, 1971), M62-1191 (w/n 1308, 1971), M62-1195 (w/n 1312, 1971), M62-1246 (w/n 1363, 1971), M62-1262 (w/n 1381, 1971), M62-1288 (w/n 1586, 1972);
- October 1989: M62-1083 (w/n 1036, 1970), M62-1085 (w/n 1038, 1970).

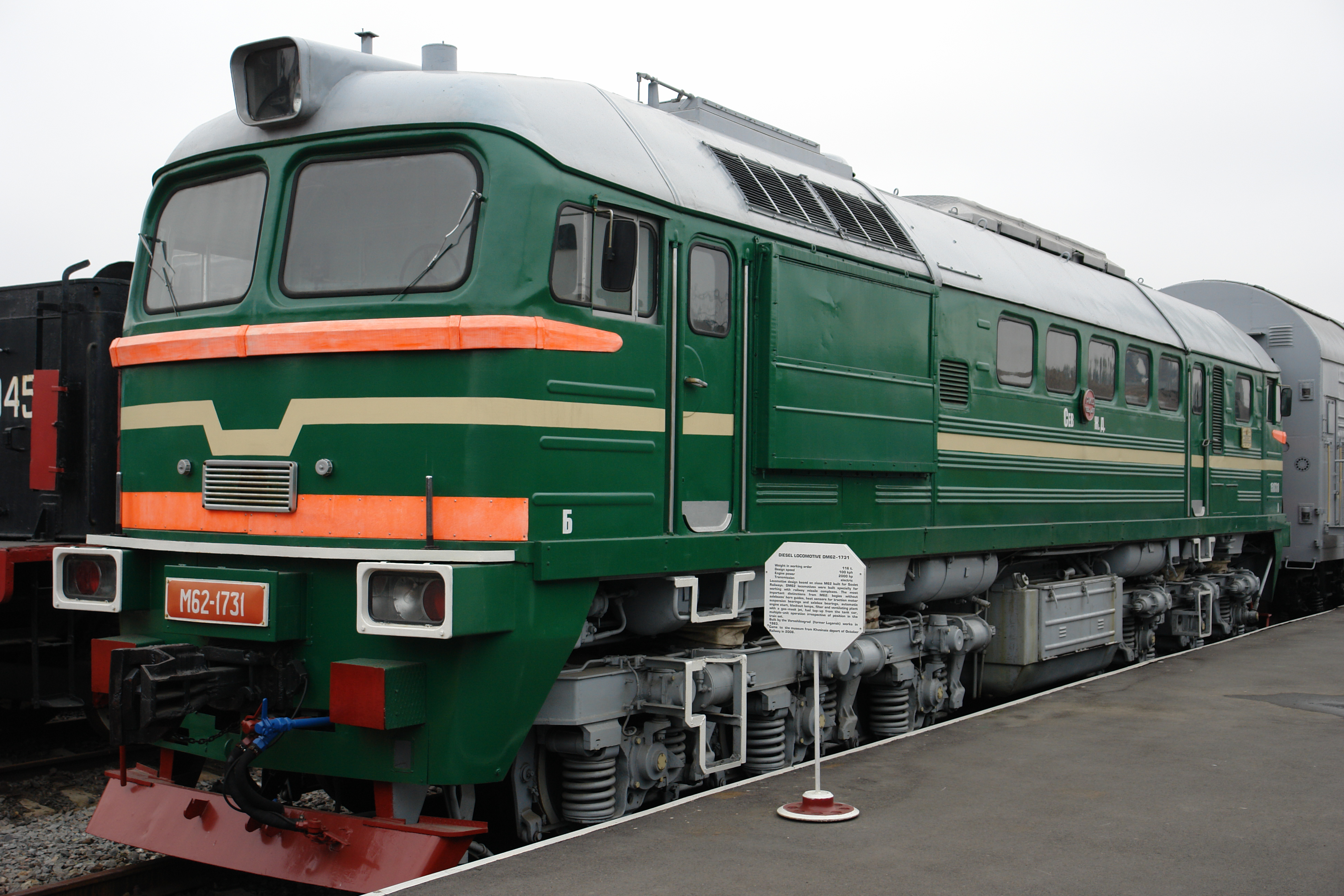
A DM62 at the St. Petersburg Railway Museum.

At least three of the ex-Russian locomotives that have entered service, 862, 863 and 870, are of the DM62 type. The DM62 was a variant of that, originally delivered to the Soviet Army between 1982 and 1994. These were operated by the 10th, 52nd and 36th Guards Missile Divisions of the Soviet Army to pull the combat missile trains in which RT-23UTTKh rail-mobile ICBMs were carried. The DM62 differs from the standard M62S by a number of changes designed to improve the reliability and survivability of the locomotive; some of these changes were later incorporated into the design of the (2)M62U. External spotting differences include the bogies, the rectangular housings for the headlights, and the box between the headlight on which the number plates are mounted. Other differences include heat sensors in the journal boxes, automatic starters for the engine, blackout shields, and multiple-unit operation regardless of the locomotives position in the train. Following the dissolution of the Railway Rocket Troops in 2000, these locomotives were transferred to the Russian Railways.

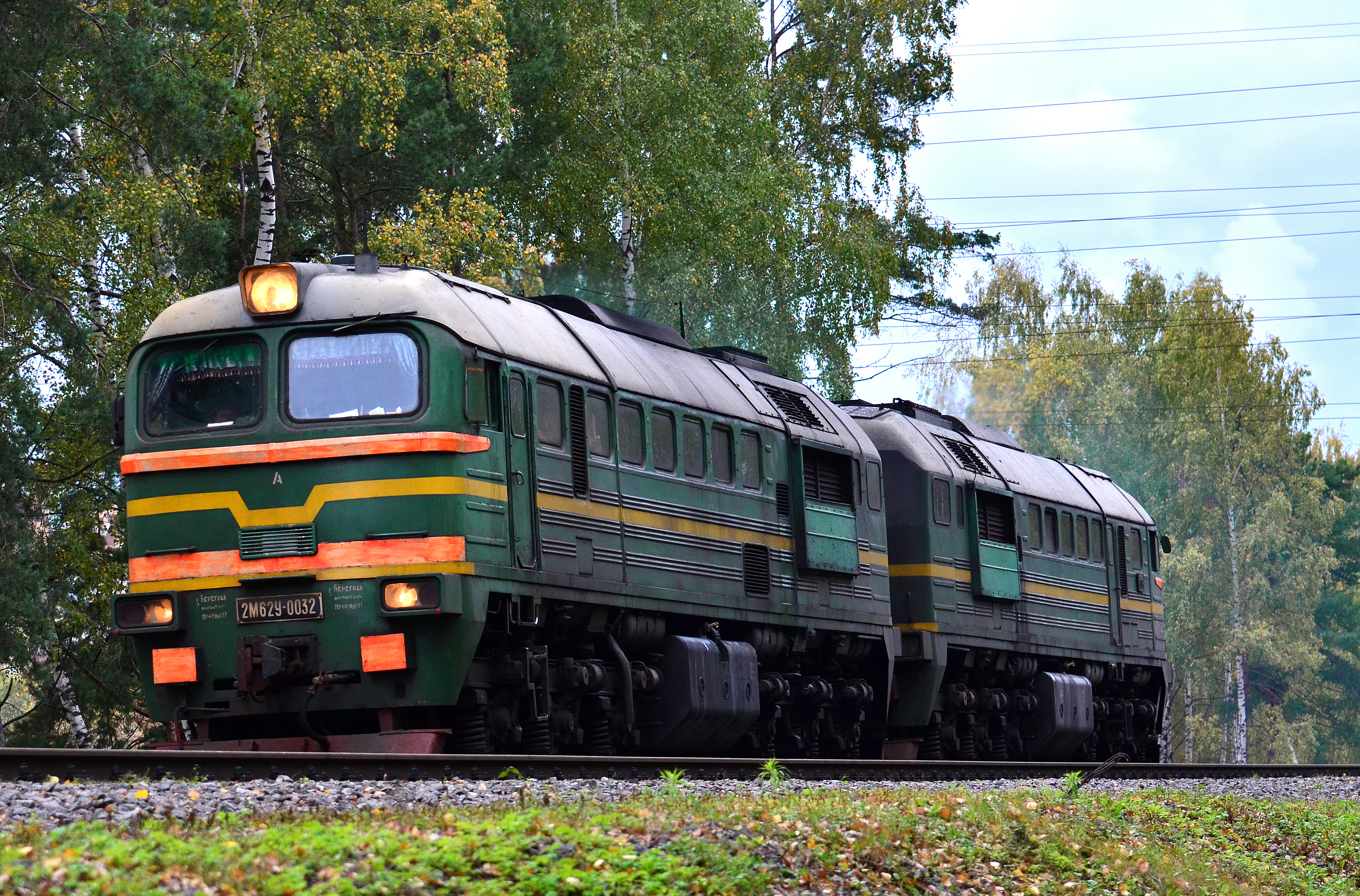
A 2M62U of the Russian Railways.

In addition to the units received second hand, two M62UP - single-section versions of the Russian 2M62U twin-section locomotives - were built new for the Korean State Railway in 1990; these were given the factory designation KM62U. Externally, these differ from standard M62s in their headlights, which are mounted in the same rectangular housings as on the DM62 and other minor details. They are powered by a water-cooled Kolomna 14D40U2 two-stroke diesel engine and have a GP-312U2 generator.

The origins of the following units are known:

- 내연818 ex-PKP
- 내연853 ex-ŽSR; red/yellow
- 내연855 ex-PKP
- 내연859 ex-ŽSR
- 내연862 ex-RZhD DM62
- 내연863 ex-RZhD DM62
- 내연866 ex-PKP
- 내연868 ex-ŽSR
- 내연870 ex-RZhD DM62
- 내연873 ex-RZhD M62U
