= Francorail-MTE CSE26-21 =

Diesel–electric locomotives

Francorail CSE26-21
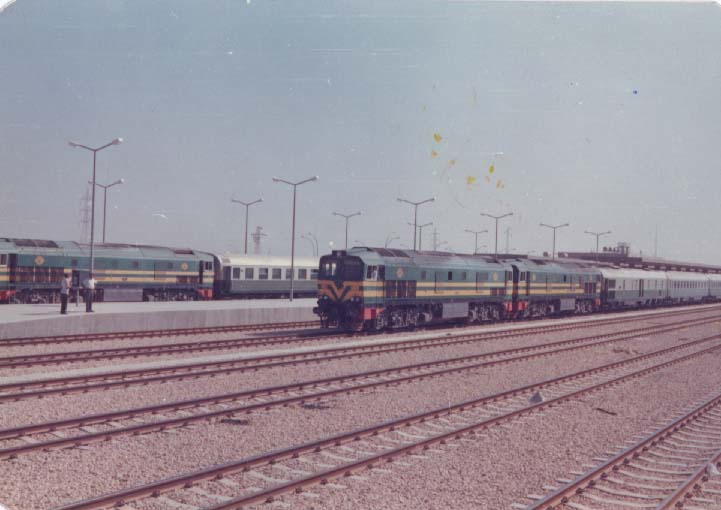
- MTE CSE26-21 of the Iraqi Republic Railways at Samawa station
Type and origin
- Power type: Diesel–electric
- Builder: GIE Francorail-MTE; France
- Model: CSE26-21
- Build date: 1981-1985
- Total produced: 90
Specifications
- Configuration
  - UIC: Co-Co
- Gauge: 1,435 mm (4 ft 8 1/2 in) standard gauge
- Fuel type: diesel
- Prime mover: ALCO 16-251F
- Engine type: V16 diesel
- Cylinders: 16
- Transmission: Electric
- Loco brake: air
Performance figures
- Maximum speed: 110 km/h (68 mph) (freight); 160 km/h (99 mph) (passenger)
- Power output: 2,650 kW (3,550 hp)
Career
- Operators: (Iraq) Iraqi Republic Railways (North Korea) Korean State Railway (Saudi Arabia) Saudi Railways
- Number in class: Iraq: 72; North Korea: 12; Saudi Arabia: 6
- Numbers: Iraq: DEM 4001 - 4011; Iraq: DEM 4101 - 4161; North Korea: ? Saudi Arabia: 3603 - 3608

The Francorail-MTE CSE26-21 is a class of diesel–electric locomotives built in France by the GIE Francorail-MTE consortium between 1981 and 1985. The bogies were made by Creusot-Loire, electric equipment and traction motors by Société MTE, while the bodies were made by Carel et Fouché. They were fitted with American-made ALCO 16-251F engines of 3600 hp (2650 kW), and final assembly was performed by Carel-Fouché.

The launch customer was the Korean State Railway of North Korea, which bought seven units in 1981, and a further five in 1985. Subsequently, the Kim Chong-t'ae Electric Locomotive Works developed electric locomotives (the Ch'ŏngnyŏnjŏl Kinyom and the Red Flag 5400 classes) on the basis of the French-made units. The bulk of production, was for the Iraqi Republic Railways, who received 72 units numbered in the series DEM 4001 - 4011 and DEM 4101 - 4161 from 1982. The Saudi Railways Organization received six locomotives of the type in 1983, numbered 3603 through 3608.
