= Red Flag 5000-8/1 class locomotive =

Class of North Korean electric locomotives

Red Flag 5000-8/1
Type and origin
- Power type: Electric
- Builder: Kim Chong-t'ae Works; North Korea
Specifications
- Configuration
  - UIC: Bo'Bo'Bo'
  - Commonwealth: Bo-Bo-Bo
- Gauge: 1,435 mm (4 ft 8 1/2 in)
- Loco weight: 120,000 kg (260,000 lb)
- Electric system/s: 3,000 V DC
- Current pickup(s): Pantographs
- Traction motors: 530 kW
  - Continuous: 1140 A
- Train brakes: rheostatic and straight air brakes
- Couplers: AAR knuckle
Performance figures
- Maximum speed: 120 km/h (75 mph) continuous: 49 km/h (30 mph)
- Power output
  - Continuous: 4,326 horsepower (3,226 kW)
Career
- Operators: (North Korea) Korean State Railway
- Class: 붉은기 (5000-8/1); Pulg'ŭn'gi 5000-8/1
- Number in class: ≥41
- Numbers: 붉은기5397-5399, 붉은기5401 - 붉은기5440

The Red Flag 5000-8/1 (붉은기, Pulg'ŭn'gi) is a class of universal mainline electric locomotives built by the Kim Chong-t'ae Electric Locomotive Works for the Korean State Railway.

In 1981, the Korean State Railway took delivery of seven Francorail-MTE CSE26-21 diesel locomotives from France, followed by five more in 1985. Due to oil shortages in the late 1980s and early 1990s, it was decided to develop a new electric locomotive based on these diesels. Like all locomotive development in the DPRK, this work was carried out by the Kim Chong-t'ae Electric Locomotive Works in P'yŏngyang.

Apparently intended as a replacement for the Red Flag 1-class locomotives, these locomotives, of which at least 41 have been built, incorporate components copied from the original French parts. Used for mainline passenger and freight service, they are painted in the standard light blue over dark green livery, or its newer light green/dark green variant.

== Named locomotive ==
There is one known named locomotive:

- Commemoration of the 7th Congress of the General Federation of Trade Unions of Korea (조선직업총동맹 제7차대회기념호, Chosonjigopchongdongmaeng che7chadaehoekinyom-ho), numbered 5437, painted in light green over dark green.
