= Saebyŏl-class locomotive =

Class of North Korean locomotives

Saebyŏl
- 새별3135 at its rollout ceremony.
Type and origin
- Power type: Diesel-hydraulic
- Builder: Kim Chong-t'ae Works; North Korea
Specifications
- Configuration
  - UIC: Bo-Bo
- Gauge: 1,435 mm (4 ft 8 1/2 in)
- Couplers: AAR knuckle
Performance figures
- Power output: 249 kW (334 hp)
Career
- Operators: (North Korea) Korean State Railway
- Class: 새별3000 Saebyŏl-3000
- Number in class: ≥227
- Numbers: 새별3001 - 새별3227

The Saebyŏl-class (Korean: 새별 Saebyŏl, "New Star") is a medium-duty diesel-hydraulic shunting locomotive built by the Kim Chong-t'ae Electric Locomotive Works for the Korean State Railway.

The Saebyŏl-class locomotives have a centrecab body design, with a full-width cab offset from the centre towards the rear of the locomotive and external walkways along the engine compartment hoods, and are slightly larger than the Red Flag-class shunters. They are powered by a 249 kilowatts (334 hp) diesel engine with a hydrokinetic transmission, and have a Bo-Bo wheel arrangement.

Numbered in the 3000 series, they are painted overall dark green with a yellow stripe. Possibly over 200 have been built; they are used primarily for shunting works in mainline stations in North Korea, and can frequently be seen on the P'yŏngŭi Line and other mainlines. The class name, if written in Hanja, is 新星. In this case, these hanja are read as saebyŏl (새별, "New Star"; however, the Soviet-built K62 (M62)-class locomotives have the class name Sinsŏng (신성, "Nova"), which are written with the same hanja. In practice this is not an issue, as the use of Chinese characters to write Korean is officially discouraged in the DPRK.

== Electric shunters ==
An unknown number of Saebyŏl-class diesel shunters have been converted to 3,000 V DC electric operation by the removal of the diesel engine and the addition of pantographs and other necessary equipment; this work was carried out at the Kim Chong-t'ae Works. The rebuilt units retain their original number and paint.
