= Kim Chong-t'ae Electric Locomotive Works =

North Korean manufacturer of railway equipment

Kim Chong-t'ae Electric Locomotive Works 김종태전기기관차연합기업소
- Several Red Flag class locomotives in various stages of completion, c. 1989
- Native name: 김종태 전기기관차 련합기업소
- Romanized name: Kim Chong-t'ae Chŏn'gi Kigwanch'a Ryŏnhap Kiŏpso
- Type: State-owned company
- Industry: Railway
- Founded: 10 November 1945
- Headquarters: Sŏsŏng-guyŏk, P'yŏngyang, North Korea
- Area served: North Korea
- Products: Electric and Diesel locomotives, subway trains and trams.

The Kim Chong-t'ae Electric Locomotive Works (Korean: 김종태전기기관차연합기업소) in P'yŏngyang is North Korea's largest manufacturer of railway equipment. Established in November 1945 in Sŏsŏng-guyŏk, P'yŏngyang near the P'yŏngyang Railway University and the Korean State Railway's West P'yŏngyang Station, the factory manufactures and overhauls electric and diesel locomotives, passenger cars, streetcars and subway trainsets. It is subordinate to the North Korean Ministry of Railways.

== History ==
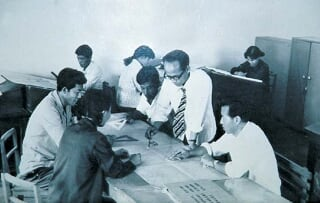
The design team at work on designing the Red Flag 1-class locomotive in 1960.

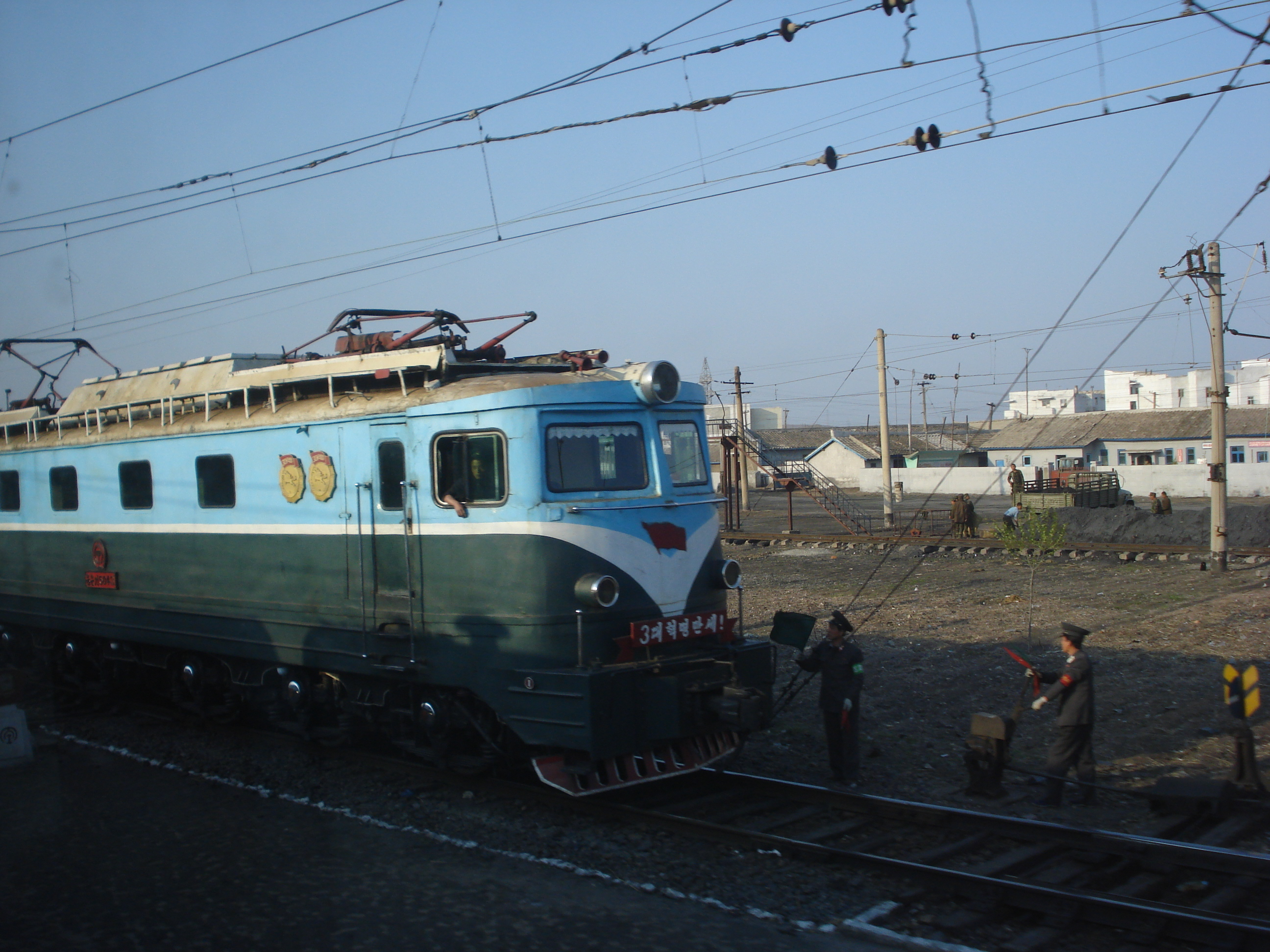
A Red Flag 1-class locomotive: North Korea's first domestically built locomotive.

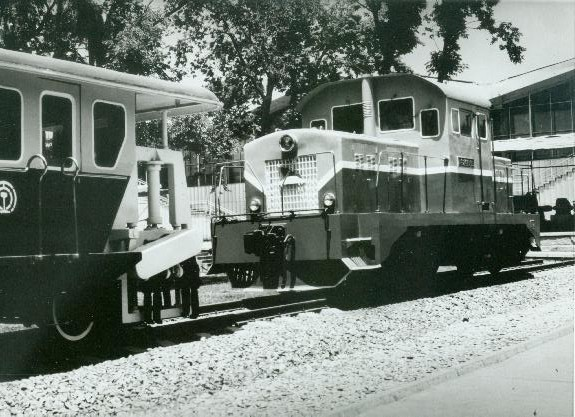
Narrow-gauge diesel locomotive built by the Kim Chong-t'ae Works in 1972

Initially established as a repair facility for rolling stock during the Japanese occupation of Korea, it became the state-owned West P'yŏngyang Railway Factory on 10 November 1945. In 1960, the facility repaired 210 steam locomotives, 1,800 freight cars and 120 passenger cars. It was expanded with Polish assistance in the late 1950s to manufacture electric locomotives as well, with work on the manufacturing facility completed on 29 August 1959. In 1961 it was renamed P'yŏngyang Electric Locomotive Works, and the first electric locomotive manufactured in North Korea was built at this factory in 1961, and the plant was awarded a medal following a visit by Kim Il Sung. Kim Il Sung paid another visit to the factory on 27 September 1987, to inspect the first completed production unit of the Red Flag 6-class articulated 8-axle electric locomotive.

Following the execution of South Korean revolutionary activist Kim Chong-t'ae, a member of the Revolutionary Party for Reunification, the factory was renamed in his honour in 1969.

In May 2023 it was announced that the Kim Jong-thae Electric Locomotive Complex is planned to move from its current location at Sosong District to a new complex to be located in an empty field in Sunan District at the northern part of the city, geo-located at (39.060606°N 125.698131°E).

== Manufacturing activities ==
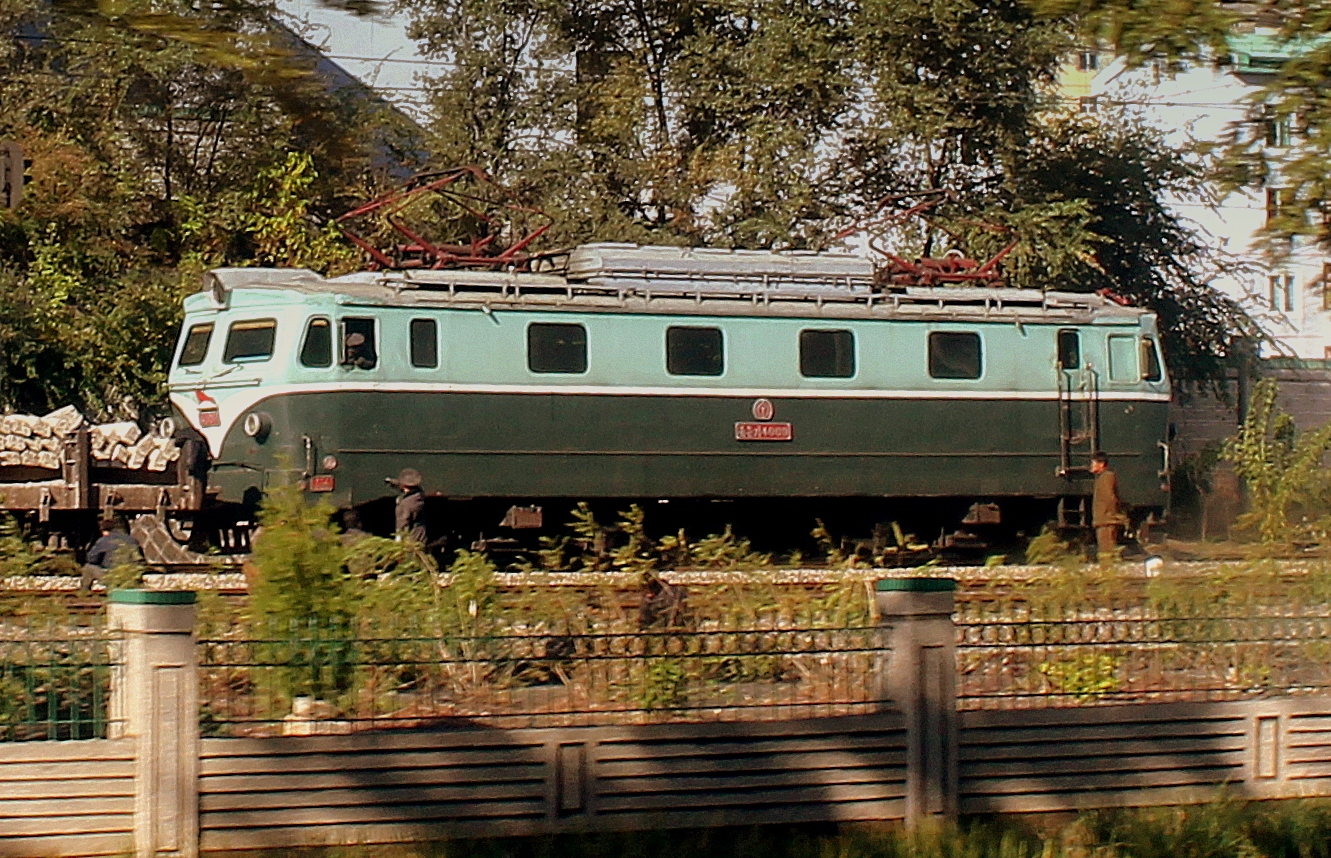
A Red Flag 2-class electric locomotive in P'yŏngyang.

As the only plant in North Korea capable of manufacturing electric and diesel locomotives, the history of the Kim Chong-t'ae Electric Locomotive Works is tied to the history of diesel and electric motive power in North Korea.

From 1961 the plant had the capacity to build 30 new electric locomotives per year in addition to the repair and construction of passenger cars. At present, the facility covers 400,000 m^{2} (4,300,000 sq ft), of which construction facilities cover 130,000 m^{2} (1,400,000 sq ft) divided into 15 workshops. The company employs 5000 people. It is capable of handling 100-110 electric locomotives per year, of which 30-50 can be of new construction; the biggest single-year output was 60 new units.

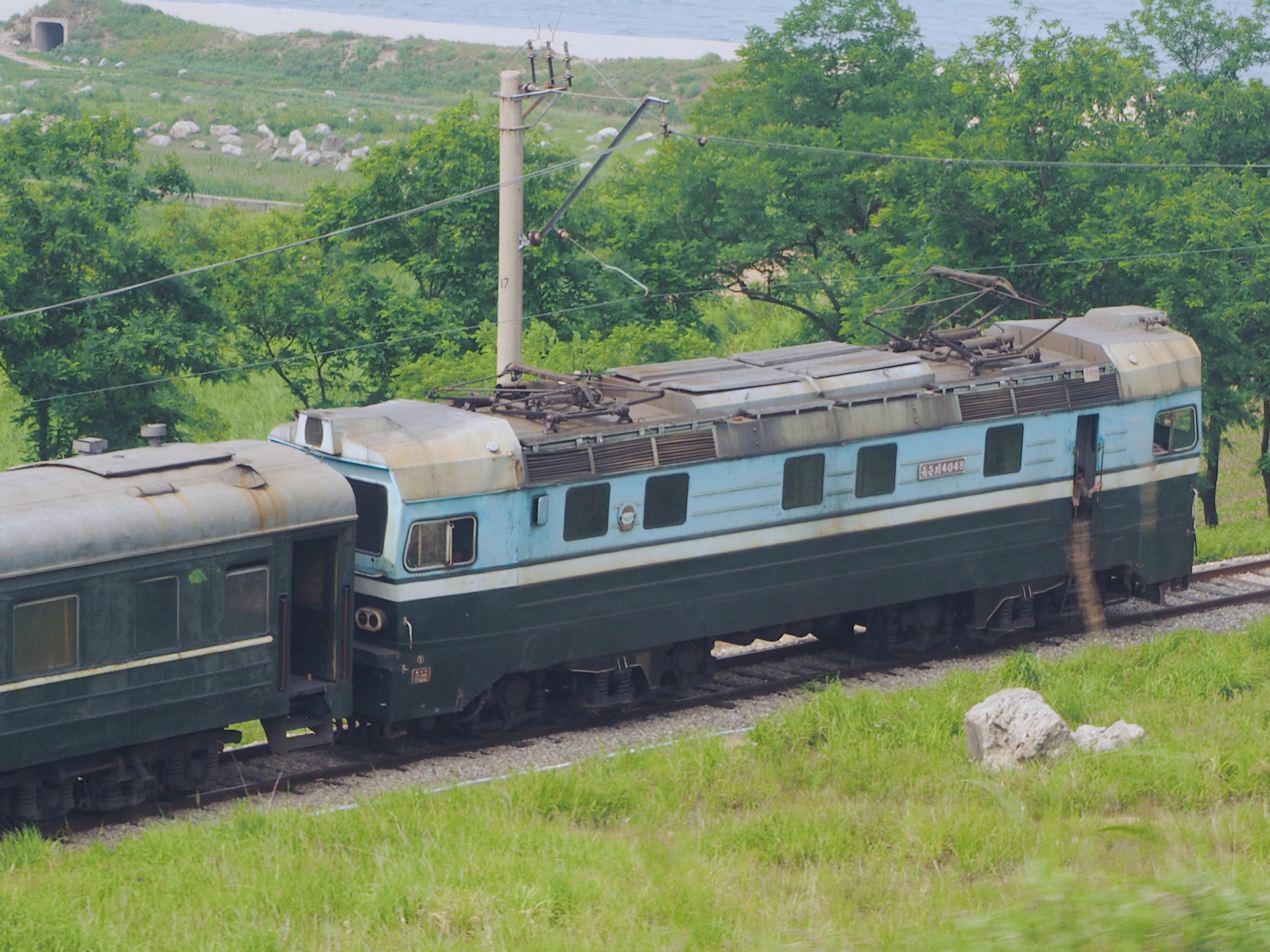
Ch'ŏngnyŏnjŏl Kinyŏm-class electric locomotive built at Kim Chong-t'ae Works.

North Korea produced its first electric locomotives in 1961, the Red Flag 1. Since then, the Kim Chong-t'ae Works has manufactured a number of other types, such as the Red Flag 6-class electric articulated locomotive and several other electric types, the Kŭmsong and Saebyŏl-class diesel locomotives along with other diesel shunters, the Juche-class 4-section electric multiple-unit train and various diesel and electric locomotives for narrow gauge lines. In recent years, the factory has also manufactured streetcars to a Czech ČKD Tatra design.

Since the 1990s, an important undertaking has been the conversion of diesel locomotives to electric operation. The biggest such project thus far has been the conversion of the Soviet-made M62-type diesel locomotives to electric operation, resulting in the Kanghaenggun-class locomotives.

Following a visit of North Korean leader Kim Jong Il on 5 January 2002, the plant began work on a new range of electric locomotives, which ultimately led to their latest product, the 2,700 kW (3,600 hp) Sŏngun Red Flag-class electric freight locomotive with asynchronous motors with a maximum speed of 120 kilometres per hour (75 mph). The first prototype was unveiled on 5 January 2011, and production versions have since begun entering service.

The plant has also produced a trainset for the P'yŏngyang Metro, unveiled at a ceremony at the plant on 23 October 2015, with Kim Jong Un in attendance. The trainset was delivered in late 2015 and went into service in January 2016.

Current production consists of the Sŏngun Red Flag 4-axle locomotives, the 3,160 kW (4,240 hp) Red Flag 5400-class Bo-Bo-Bo electric locomotive, the 4,200 kW (5,600 hp) Red Flag 7-class electric articulated locomotive, along with a small number of 249 kW (334 hp) diesel-hydraulic and 176 kW (236 hp) kW diesel-mechanical locomotives, narrow-gauge electric and 551 kW (739 hp) narrow-gauge diesel locomotives.

== Products ==
=== Electric locomotives ===
==== New construction ====
- 100-series – loose copies of the Czechoslovak ČSD Class E 499.1-class.
- 170-series – offset-centre cab Bo-Bo electric shunting locomotives.
- 200-series – offset-centre cab Bo-Bo electric shunting locomotives.
- 300-series – small centre cab Bo-Bo electric shunting locomotives. At least 85 built.
- 500-series – boxy true centre cab Bo-Bo electric shunting locomotives
- Red Flag 1 & 2-classes – universal electric locomotives. North Korea's first mass-produced, domestically made electric locomotive; over 150, possibly nearly 400, built. Based on Škoda Type 22E2
- Red Flag 6-class – heavy articulated electric freight locomotives.
- Red Flag 7-class – heavy articulated electric freight locomotives.
- Red Flag 2000-class - electric locomotives used primarily for passenger trains.
- Ch'ŏngnyŏnjŏl Kinyom-class – electric freight and passenger locomotives, numbered in the 4000 and 90000 series.
- Saebyŏl 1000-class – small centre cab electric shunters, at least 79 built.
- Saebyŏl 3000-series – medium-duty electric shunting locomotives converted for electric operation by the Kim Chong-t'ae Electric Locomotive Works; retained original numbers after conversion.
- Sŏngun Red Flag-class – new electric freight locomotives with asynchronous motors.
- 6-axle AC locomotive with asynchronous motors

==== Conversions ====
- 150-series – converted from Hungarian-made Ganz DVM-4 diesel shunters.
- Kanghaenggun-class – electric freight locomotives converted from M62-type and Kŭmsŏng-class diesel locomotives.

=== Diesel locomotives ===
==== New construction ====
- Saebyŏl 3000-class – medium-duty diesel-hydraulic shunting locomotives; some have been converted to electric operation.
- Kŭmsŏng-class – copies of the Soviet M62-type heavy diesel locomotive; some have been converted to electric operation.
- Red Flag-class – diesel shunters.

=== Electric multiple units ===
==== New construction ====
- Juche – four-section high-speed multisystem EMU built in 1976. One set built.
- Red Flag 900-class – a unique combination electric locomotive with a section for carrying passengers.

==== Conversions ====
- 150-series – former P'yŏngyang Metro trainsets, second-hand Type D sets from Berlin, converted for operation as mainline EMUs.
- 500-series – former P'yŏngyang Metro trainsets, second-hand Type GI sets from Berlin, converted for operation as mainline EMUs.
- 1000-series – former P'yŏngyang Metro trainsets, built new for North Korea by the Changchun Car Company of China in 1972, subsequently converted for operation as mainline EMUs.

=== Trams ===
- Narrow gauge trams for Wonsan-Kalma tourist resort.
- Prototype open air (windowless/doorless) tram car
