= Juche-class EMU =

North Korean electric multiple unit

Juche
- The Juche-class EMU at its unveiling after refurbishment.
Type and origin
- Power type: Electric
- Builder: Kim Chong-t'ae Works; North Korea
- Build date: 3 March 1978
Specifications
- Gauge: 1,435 mm (4 ft 8 1/2 in)
- Electric system/s: 3,000 V DC + 25 kV 60 Hz AC
- Current pickup: Pantographs
- Couplers: AAR knuckle
Performance figures
- Maximum speed: 120 km/h (75 mph) continuous: 64 km/h (40 mph)
- Power output: 1,720 kilowatts (2,340 PS)
Career
- Operators: (North Korea) Korean State Railway
- Class: 주체
- Number in class: ≥2 set

The Juche-class (Korean: 《주체》호) are a pair of 4-car electric multiple units built by the Kim Chong-t'ae Electric Locomotive Works in 1978 and 1982, intended for service on the Korean State Railway.

== Description ==
Electric railcars had been used in Korea before the war by the Kŭmgangsan Electric Railway, and these were used by Korean State Railway until the line was destroyed during the Korean War, and no further electric railcars were used after that for many years. However, the opening of the P'yŏngyang Metro in 1973, along with worldwide attention on high-speed electric trainsets such as the Japanese Shinkansen put into service in 1964 and the ER200 class introduced by the Soviet Railways in 1974, led the Railway Ministry to direct efforts towards the development of an electric multiple unit for North Korea, resulting in the unveiling of North Korea's first electric trainset, the Juche-class EMU, on 3 March 1978 at Kim Jong Thae as part of the 200 day campaign. Externally, the four-car set was similar in appearance to the 181 series trainsets used by the Japanese National Railways on the Kodama limited express of the day; internally, despite all of North Korea's electrification being 3000 V DC, the Juche-class EMU was built for two-system operation - possibly with a view to future operation in South Korea, where 25 kV AC electrification was used.

The trainset was named 'Juche' by Kim Il Sung, in appreciation of the labour the workers of Kim Chong-t'ae locomotive works put into manufacturing it.

A second 4-car set was built in 1982, as part of the celebrations for Kim Il Sung's 70th birthday.

== Operation ==
One of the set was refurbished, repainted, and put into use on a daily commuter service for scientists between P'yŏngyang and Paesanjŏm on June 23, 1998, timetabled to take one hour to cover the 38 km (24 mi) distance each way.

== Philately ==
The train was featured on a stamp issued on 30 April 1987.
