= Red Flag 2000-class locomotive =

Class of North Korean electric locomotives

Red Flag 2000
Type and origin
- Power type: Electric
- Builder: Kim Chong-t'ae Works; North Korea
- Build date: 1968
Specifications
- Configuration
  - UIC: Bo′Bo′
- Gauge: 1,435 mm (4 ft 8 1/2 in)
- Electric system/s: 3,000 V DC
- Current pickup(s): Pantographs
- Couplers: AAR knuckle
Performance figures
- Maximum speed: 120 km/h (75 mph)
- Power output: 2,120 kW (2,840 hp)
Career
- Operators: (North Korea) Korean State Railway
- Class: 붉은기2000 Pulg'ŭn'gi-2000
- Number in class: ≥43
- Numbers: 2001-2043

The Red Flag 2000-class (Korean: 붉은기2000 Pulg'ŭn'gi-2000) is an electric locomotive built by the Kim Chong-t'ae Electric Locomotive Works for the Korean State Railway, intended for use as a marshalling locomotive. They are used primarily for hauling non-express passenger trains on mainlines in North Korea; they are frequently seen on the P'yŏngŭi Line.

Internally, in terms of their electrical and mechanical components, the Red Flag 2000-class locomotives are based on the Red Flag 1-class, but with Bo-Bo wheel arrangement, riding on two-axle roller bearing bogies. The boxy body is of a hood-type design, with a cab at one end, external walkways around the long hood. They are generally operated with the long hood forward. Producing 2,120 kilowatts (2,840 hp), they entered service in 1968. At least 43 were built, numbered 붉은기2001 to 붉은기2043, and most are painted in the standard light blue over dark blue livery, though a few have been noted in the newer two-tone light green over dark green scheme. One locomotive, number 2015, carries special titles on the sides reading Chŏngju Sŏnyon-ho (정주소년호, "Chŏngju Youth-class"). This is a feature shared with rebuilt locomotives of the Red Flag 1 and Red Flag 2 classes, but it is not known if this means this unit has been rebuilt.
