= Kanghaenggun-class locomotive =

Class of North Korean electric locomotives

Kanghaenggun
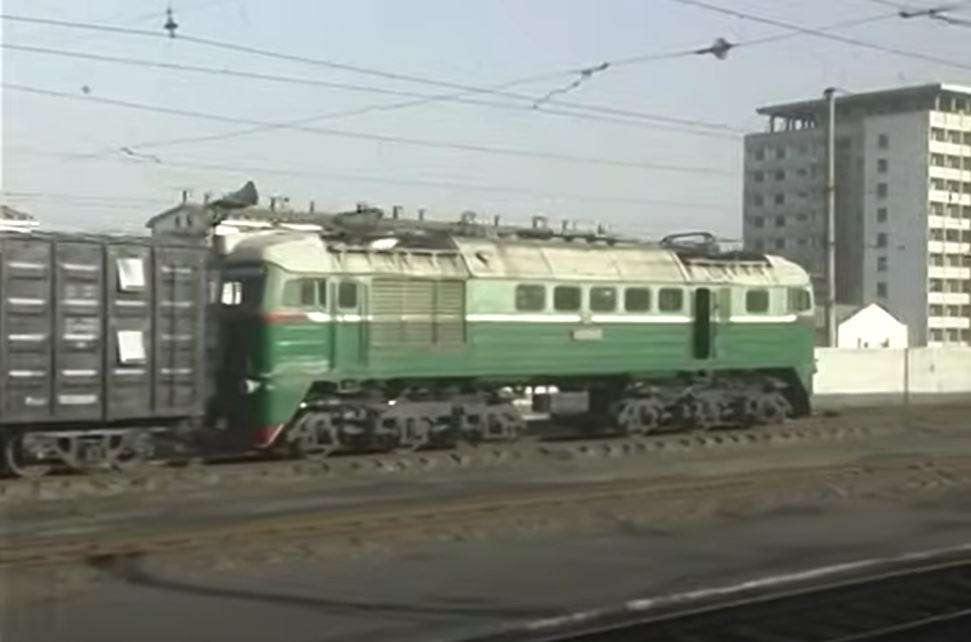
- North Korean Kanghaenggun class
Type and origin
- Power type: Electric
- Builder: Voroshilovgrad Locomotive Factory; Soviet Union
- Rebuilder: Kim Chong-t'ae Works; North Korea
Specifications
- Configuration
  - UIC: Co′Co′
- Gauge: 1,435 mm (4 ft 8 1/2 in)
- Wheel diameter: 1,050 mm (41 in)
- Minimum curve: 125 m (410 ft 1 in)
- Wheelbase: 12,800 mm (42 ft 0 in)
- Pivot centres: 8,600 mm (28 ft 3 in)
- Length: 17,550 mm (57 ft 7 in)
- Width: 2,950 mm (9 ft 8 in)
- Height: 4,493 mm (14 ft 8.9 in)
- Loco weight: approx. 100 t (220,000 lb)
- Electric system/s: 3,000 V DC
- Current pickup(s): Pantographs
- Traction motors: ED-118A
- Loco brake: Oerlikon Air
- Couplers: AAR knuckle
Performance figures
- Power output: 1,470 kW (1,970 hp)
Career
- Operators: (North Korea) Korean State Railway
- Class: 강행군; Kanghaenggun
- Number in class: ≥23
- Numbers: 강행군1.5-01 - 강행군1.5-21; 0309, 399

The Kanghaenggun-class (Korean: 강행군, "Forced March") is a class of electric locomotives for freight trains operated by the Korean State Railway on mainlines, especially the important P'yŏngŭi Line. They were converted to 3,000 V DC electric operation by the Kim Chong-t'ae Electric Locomotive Works from Soviet-built K62-class diesel locomotives.

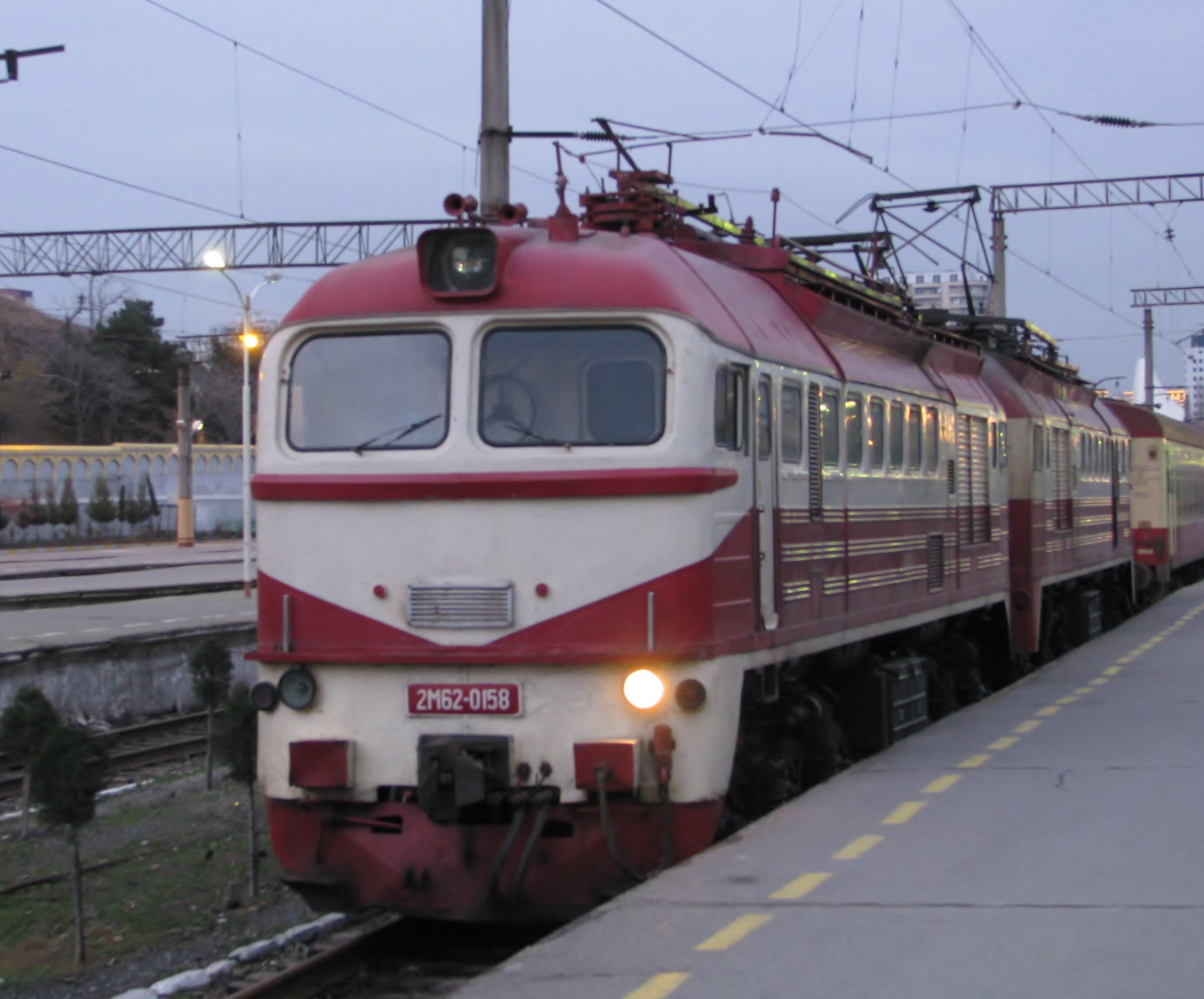
An M62-type diesel converted to electric operation by the Azerbaijan Railways, very similar to the North Korean Kanghaenggun class conversions.

A similar projects have been undertaken by the Azerbaijan Railways, who have converted one 2-section 2M62 locomotive to electric operation as well, using parts from a VL8 electric locomotive, and by a Polish train operating company Rail Polska, a subsidiary of Rail World, who used a bespoke electric equipment.

== Description ==
Through the 1990s, North Korea suffered through a severe economic crisis, made worse by severe floods in 1995 and 1996, and a drought in 1997. This period is known as the "Arduous March" or "Forced March"; the class derives its name from this. The economic crisis also made obtaining diesel fuel extremely difficult, so the Korean State Railways decided to convert a number of diesel locomotives to electric operation, as intensive efforts have been made to restore as much generation of electricity as possible, with fair success over the past years.

As a result, in 1998 the Kim Chong-t'ae works began a program to convert the more decrepit M62-type diesels in the KSR's inventory to electric operation. This was achieved by removing the diesel engine, fuel tanks and other unneeded equipment, and the installation of the necessary transformers and related gear to convert the power collected from the overhead lines, via newly-installed pantographs, to the traction motors. The resulting unit is considerably lighter than the diesel version, and sound like oversized streetcars. Like the original diesels, these produce 1,470 kilowatts (1,970 hp), making suitable for the same services as the diesels.

At least 21 Kanghaenggun-class locomotives have been rebuilt so far, numbered 강행군1.5-01 through 강행군1.5-21 (1.5 refers to 1 May, International Workers' Day). The previous identity of one unit is known - 1.5-13 was rebuilt from the former 632.

In addition to the units numbered in the 1.5-xx range, two others of this class have been noted, numbered 309 (painted dark green and white) and 399 (dark blue and white), which are distinctly different from the 1.5-series. Unlike those, which were rebuilt from original Soviet-built M62s, the bodies of these have all the distinctive features of the Kŭmsong-class, domestically built copies of the M62.
