= Red Flag 6-class locomotive =

Class of North Korean electric locomotives

Red Flag 6
- The first prototype of the Red Flag 6 class at its rollout in 1981.
Type and origin
- Power type: Electric
- Builder: Kim Chong-t'ae Works; North Korea
- Build date: 1981-1987
Specifications
- Configuration
  - UIC: Bo′Bo′+Bo′Bo′
- Gauge: 1,435 mm (4 ft 8 1/2 in)
- Wheel diameter: 1,370 mm (4 ft 6 in)
- Wheelbase: 3,300 mm (10 ft 10 in)
- Length: 32,600 mm (106 ft 11 in)
- Width: 3,100 mm (10 ft 2 in)
- Height: 4,700 mm (15 ft 5 in)
- Loco weight: 176 t (388,000 lb)
- Electric system/s: 3,000 V DC
- Current pickup(s): Pantographs
- RPM
  - Maximum RPM: 745 rpm
- Traction motors
  - Rating 1 hour: 1520 A
- Gear ratio: 1:3.86
- Loco brake: hand, air, regenerative brake
- Couplers: AAR knuckle
Performance figures
- Maximum speed: 120 km/h (75 mph) one hour: 49 km/h
- Power output
  - 1 hour: 4,240 kW (5,690 hp)
- Tractive effort
  - 1 hour: 306 kN (69,000 lbf)
Career
- Operators: (North Korea) Korean State Railway
- Class: 붉은기6 Pulg'ŭn'gi-6
- Number in class: ≥37
- Numbers: 6001-6037+

The Red Flag 6-class (Korean: 붉은기6 Pulg'ŭn'gi-6) is a 4,240 kW (5,690 hp) two-section, permanently coupled electric locomotive built by the Kim Chong-t'ae Electric Locomotive Works and used by the Korean State Railway for heavy freight trains on mountainous lines.

== Description ==
As the electrification of the Korean State Railway's network continued into the 1980s, the Red Flag 1 and Red Flag 2 class locomotives were the dominant type in service under the wires. However, with the electrification of steep mountain lines, it was realised that a more powerful locomotive was needed. Therefore, the Kim Chong-tae Electric Locomotive Works began design work on an articulated locomotive to operate freight trains on the difficult mountainous sections.

Using the Red Flag 2 class as a starting point, the Red Flag 6 (붉은기6, Pulg'ŭn'gi-6) class was developed. The result was a permanently coupled Bo'Bo'+Bo'Bo' articulated locomotive with eight capacitors, made up of two sections; these sections are single-cab versions of the Red Flag 2. The Red Flag 6 class is thus an articulated descendant of the Škoda Type 30E, which had formed the basis for the design of the Red Flag 1 and Red Flag 2 after North Korea bought a licence to build the type, including technology transfer, from Czechoslovakia. The first prototype was shown in 1981.

Numbered in the 6000 series, production of the new design began in 1986, and was put into service in 1987 to haul freight trains on the P'yŏngra Line. These four-bogie, eight-axle articulated units are 33 metres (108 ft 3 in) long, weigh 176 tonnes (388,000 lb) and produce 4,240 kilowatts (5,690 hp). They have a maximum speed of 100 kilometres per hour (62 mph) and can pull 3,200 tonnes (7,100,000 lb). Trial runs with passenger trains were undertaken, but the type is now mainly used on east-west freight trains on the P'yŏngra Line. The first prototype received a cream over red paint scheme, but production units are painted in the standard light blue over dark green livery.

== Named locomotives ==
There are three known named Red Flag 6 locomotives:

- Light (광명호, Kwangmyong-ho) - one locomotive, painted in cream over blue with a white stripe, named personally by Kim Jong Il, symbolising the bright future of students and youth,
- Thousand-ri of liberation No.1 (광복의천리길1호, Kwangbokuicholligil1-ho) - one known locomotive,
- Thousand-ri of liberation No.2 (광복의천리길2호, Kwangbokuicholligil2-ho) - one known locomotive, painted in light green over dark green.
