= Škoda Type 22E2 =

Škoda Type 22E_{2}
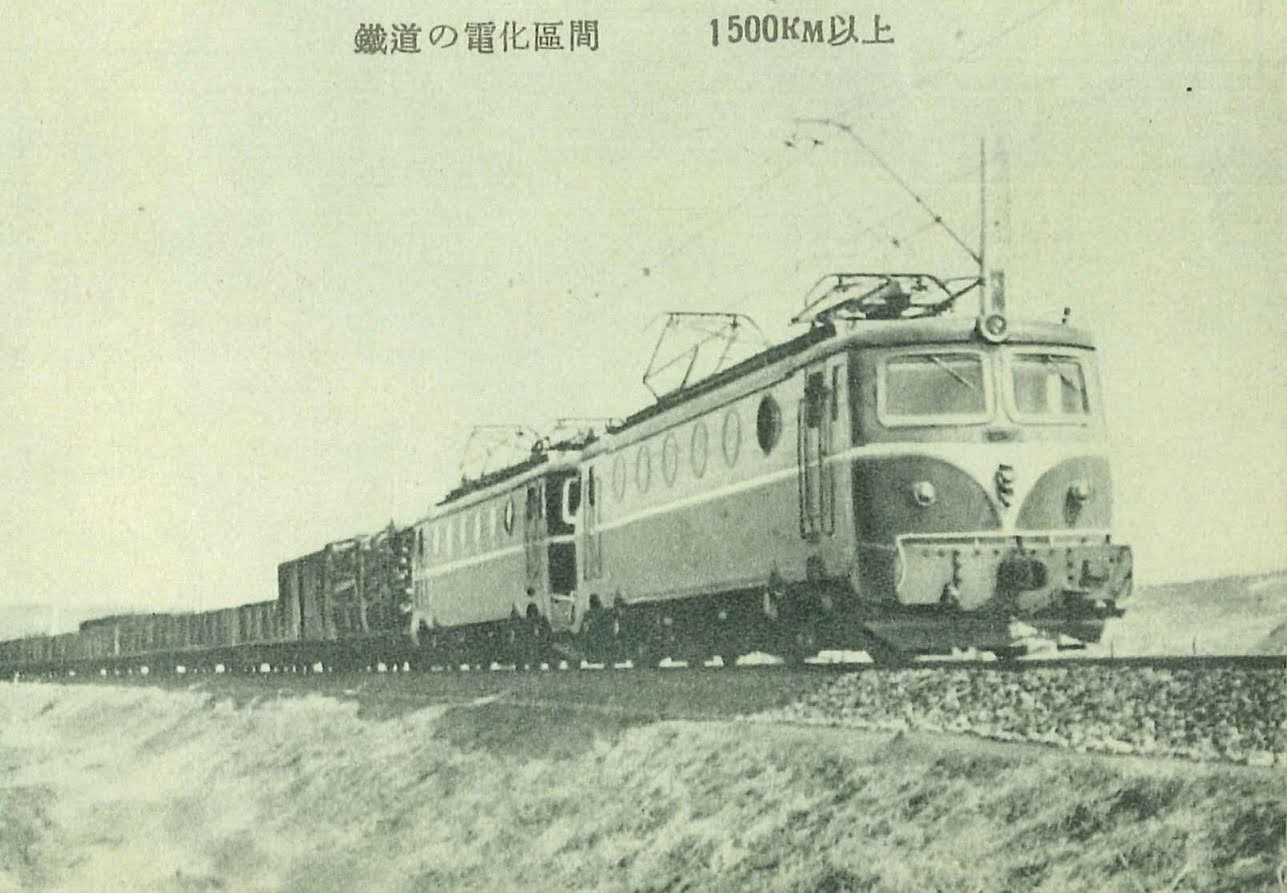
- A pair of Škoda Type 22E2s.
Type and origin
- Power type: Electric
- Builder: Škoda Works; Czechoslovakia
- Build date: 1958
Specifications
- Configuration
  - UIC: Bo′Bo′
- Gauge: 1,435 mm (4 ft 8 1/2 in)
- Electric system/s: 3,000 V DC
- Current pickup: Pantographs
- Couplers: AAR knuckle
Performance figures
- Maximum speed: 120 km/h (75 mph)
- Power output: 2.03 MW (2,720 hp)
Career
- Operators: (North Korea) Korean State Railway
- Number in class: 10
- Numbers: 전기50 series

The Škoda Type 22E_{2} type locomotive is a multipurpose electric locomotive built for the North Korean State Railway by the Škoda Works of Czechoslovakia.

== Description ==
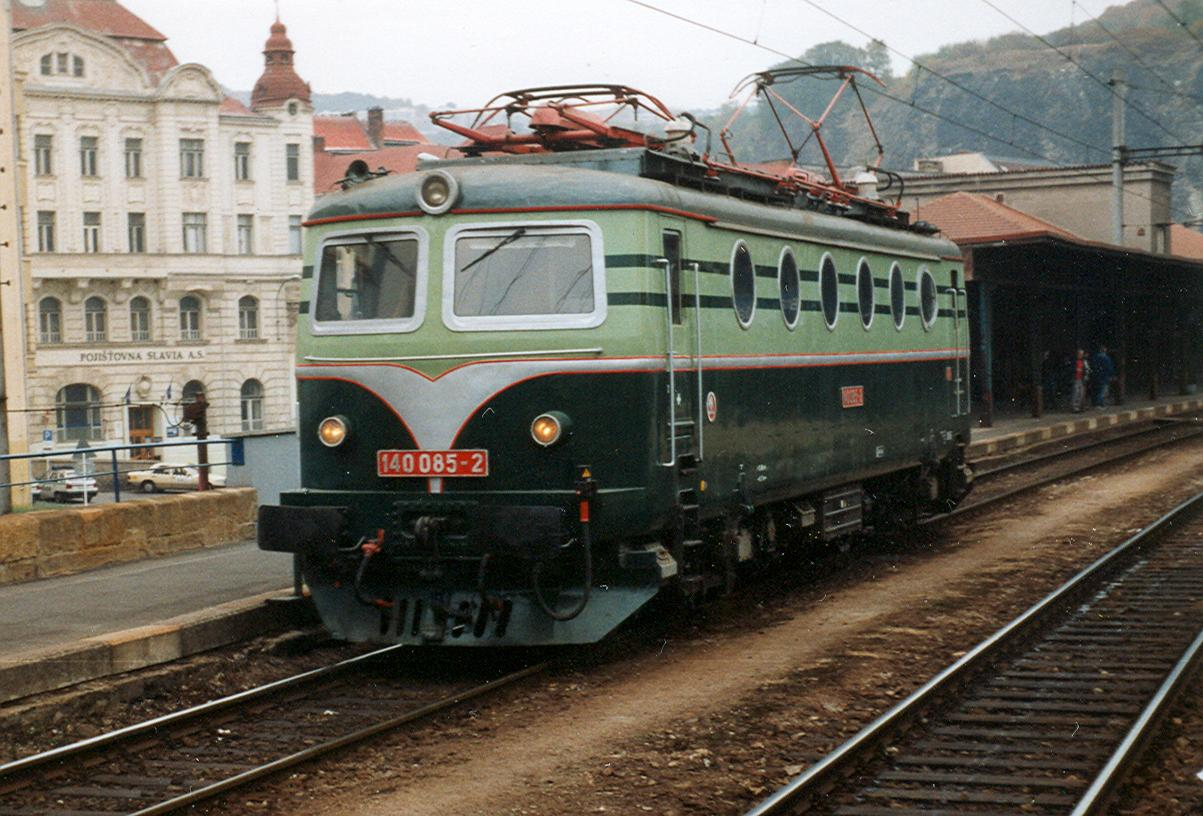
ČD Class 140, a class of very similar locomotives off of which the 22E2 was based

Although some lines had been electrified already in the colonial era, the large-scale electrification of North Korea's railways began in 1956 after the end of the Korean War and the subsequent reconstruction of North Korea's railway infrastructure. To work the newly electrified lines, an order was placed with the Škoda Works in Czechoslovakia for electric locomotives of works Type 22E_{2}, based on the Type 12E locomotives built by Škoda for the Czechoslovak State Railways (ČSD class E 499.0).

The Type 12E was developed by Škoda Works based on the technology of the BLS Class Ae 4/4 built by SLM Winterthur. The first prototype was completed in 1953, and production of types 12E_{1}—12E_{6} continued until 1958 for the ČSD and the Polish State Railways (as class ET13), along with the very similar derivative types - the Type 22E_{2} for North Korea, and Types 24E_{0}, 41E_{0}—41E_{2} and 29E_{0} for the Soviet Railways (as class ЧС1 (ChS1)). All variants of the type were built to operate on the 3,000 V DC system.

These are dual-cab locomotives with welded-steel bodies and two two-axle bogies. Each bogie has two six-pole DC traction motors, one for each axle. Current collection is via pantograph from overhead lines; the on-board electrical system is 48 V.

The total number of Type 22E2 locomotives ordered by the Korean State Railways is not known, but at least three are still in service as of October 2015. Some have been rebuilt in various ways, such as the addition of 'bumpers' on the ends and other features unique to individual units; these have been renumbered (one such rebuilt locomotive carries the number plates of the Ch'ŏngnyŏnjŏl Kinyŏm-class "Pulg'ŭn'gi 4011"), but the unmodified examples continue to carry their original 전기50 series numbers. They are painted in the standard light blue over dark green or light green over dark green scheme used on most other electric locomotives; this scheme is very similar to the livery used on Czechoslovak and Soviet examples of this type.
