= Three Revolutions Exhibition =

Museum in North Korea

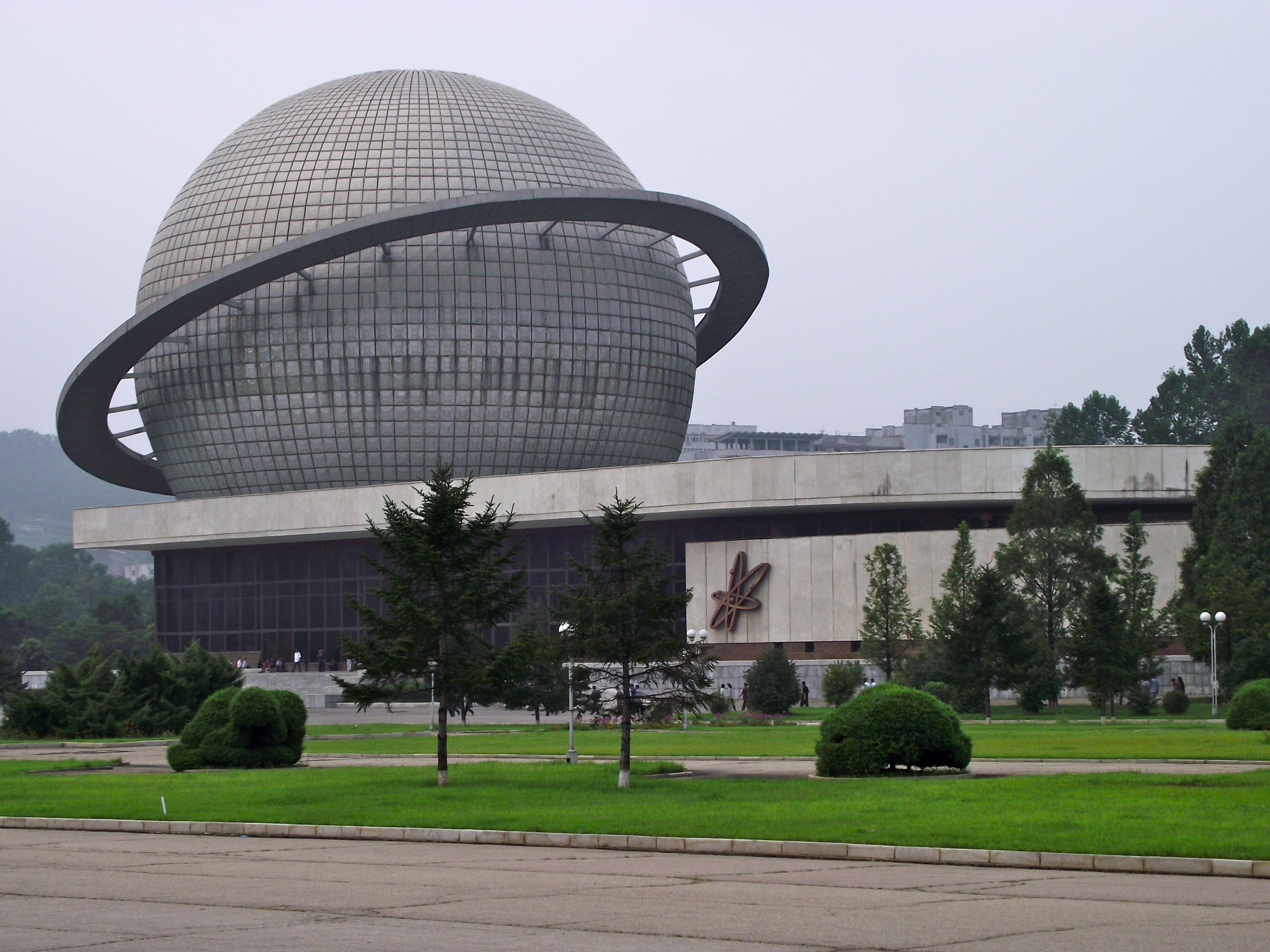
- The planetarium, shaped like Saturn
- Location: Pyongyang, North Korea
- Coordinates: 39°04′48″N 125°45′22″E

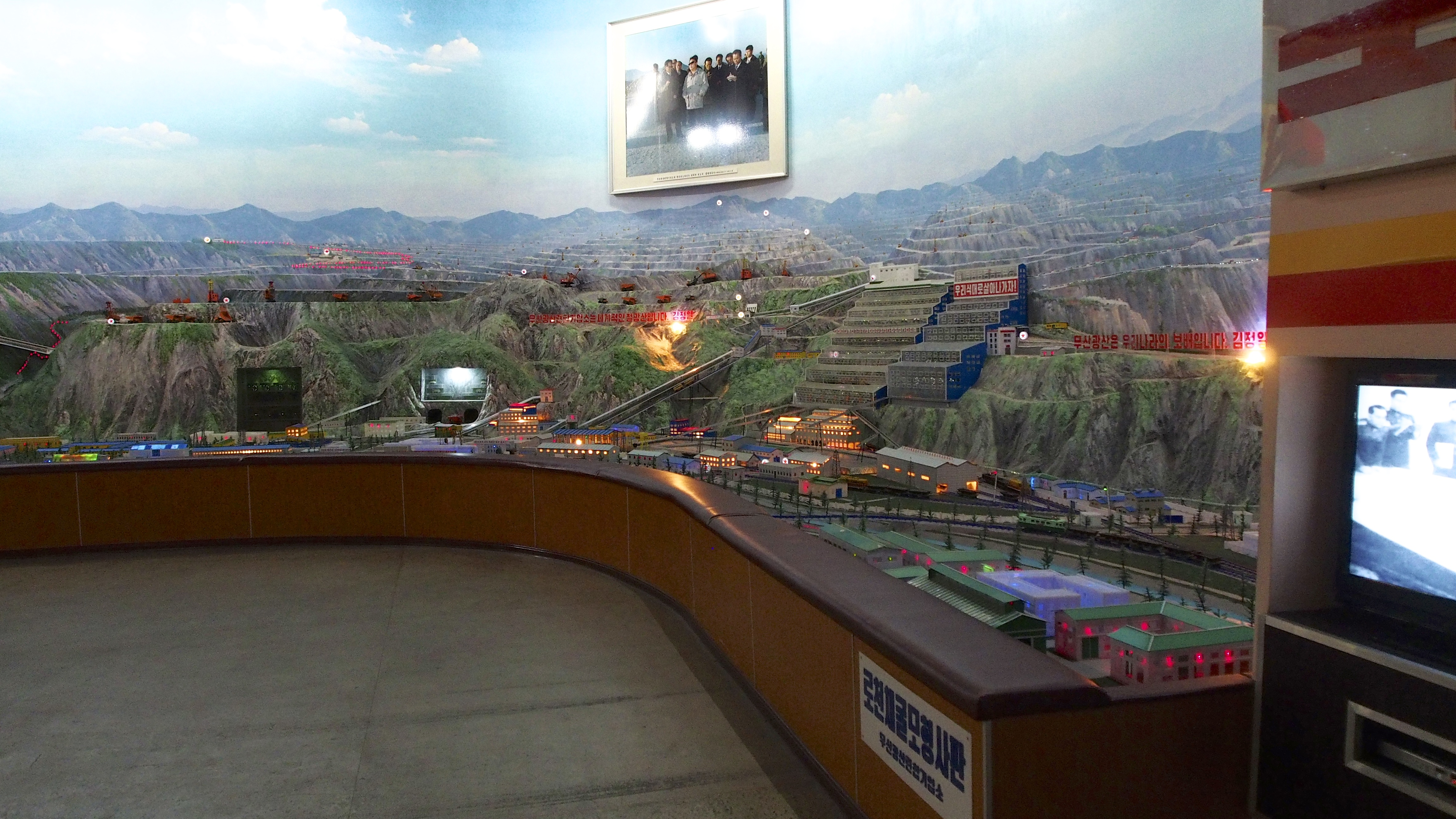
An exhibit of mining in North Korea

The Three Revolutions Exhibition (Korean: 3대혁명전시관) is a museum located in Pyongyang, North Korea. The exhibition primarily showcases the three revolutions of Kim Il Sung: ideological, technical, and cultural. It is in the Ryonmot-dong area, and its grounds showcase the accomplishments of Juche ideological education, industrial development and agricultural improvement. The central building has a shape resembling a spherical planet with rings, similar to the planet of Saturn. The dome itself also houses a planetarium. In the complex, there are six exhibits which detail North Korea's advances in electronics, heavy industry, agriculture, class education, and technology. There is also an outdoor display of vehicles produced in North Korea.

The Three Revolutions Movement has been compared to China's Cultural Revolution led by Mao Zedong. While the ideological, technical, and cultural values were already emphasized in the 1960s, the term Three Revolutions was not used until after 1973. Its goal, according to author Jiyoung Song, was to turn every North Korean citizen into a "Juche-style communist" and was necessary for Juche implementation and actualization.

== History ==
The museum was first established as a non-permanent Industrial and Agricultural Exhibition between 1946 and 1956, then improved to be the current Three Revolutions Exhibition in 1983. Further renovations took place in 1993, when the museum was enlarged.

== See also ==
- List of museums in North Korea
- Pyongyang
- Qianlima
