= Francorail =

French rolling stock and rail transport manufacturer

- Company type: Subsidiary
- Industry: Rail transport
- Founded: 1970
- Defunct: 1989
- Fate: Defunct, acquired by Alstom
- Headquarters: Paris, France
- Area served: Worldwide
- Products: Locomotives; High-speed trains Intercity and commuter trains Trams; People movers Signalling systems

Francorail was a grouping of French railway rolling stock manufacturers, formed in the early 1970s and defunct by the late 1980s.

== History ==
The Francorail grouping was formed to combine the individual areas of expertise or production of a number of French rolling stock manufacturers. The grouping included Carel-Fouche-Languepin and de Dietrich, as well as Creusot-Loire and Jeumont-Schneider.

In 1973 the company and MTE (Materiel de Traction Electrique), a joint subsidiary of Creusot-Loire and Jeumont-Schneider formed a Groupement d'Intérêt Economique with Francorail, called MTE-Francorail.

In 1976 Francorail-MTE with Alstom were contracted to manufacture the first series production TGV trains.

In 1987 the association became defunct with the transfer of the railway equipment activities of Schneider (rolling stock, and electrical equipment through MTE) to Alstom.
