= Red Flag 1-class locomotive =

Class of North Korean electric locomotives

Red Flag 1 Red Flag 2
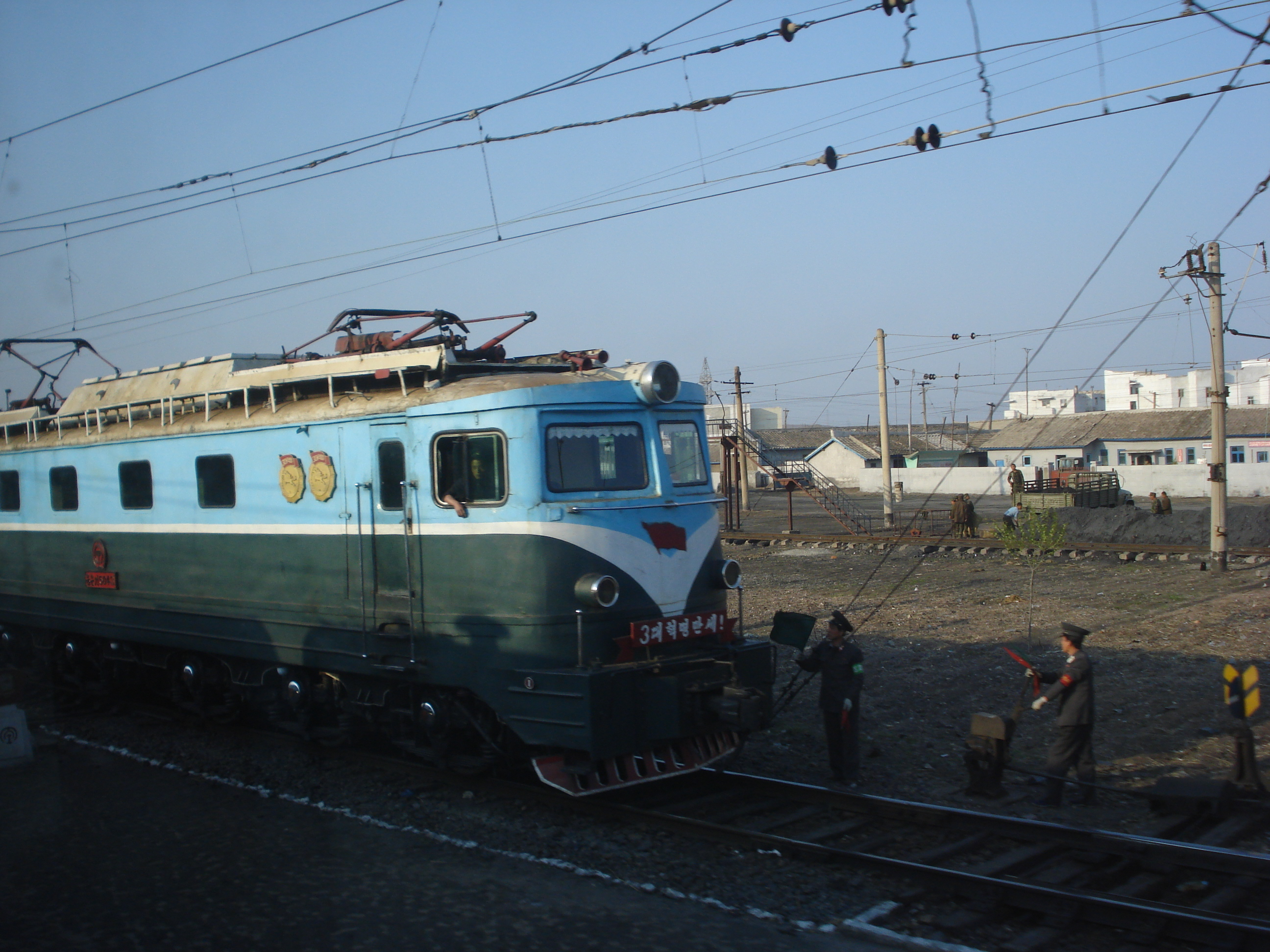
- Red Flag 1 class 붉은기5043
Type and origin
- Power type: Electric
- Designer: Chŏn Chae-yun
- Builder: Kim Chong-t'ae Works; North Korea
- Build date: 1961-1980
Specifications
- Configuration
  - UIC: Co′Co′
- Gauge: 1,435 mm (4 ft 8 1/2 in)
- Wheel diameter: 1,370 millimetres (4.49 ft)
- Minimum curve: 120 m
- Length: 18864 mm
- Width: 2900 mm
- Height: 4700 mm (raised pantograph), 4650 mm (lowered pantograph)
- Loco weight: 120 tons
- Electric system/s: 3,000 V DC
- Current pickup: Pantographs
- Traction motors: NB-410
  - Continuous: 1140 A
- Gear ratio: 1:3.86
- Couplers: AAR knuckle
Performance figures
- Maximum speed: 120 km/h (75 mph)
- Power output: 3,180 kW (4,260 hp)
- Tractive effort: 32500 KG
Career
- Operators: (North Korea) Korean State Railway
- Class: See text
- Number in class: 150+
- Numbers: 5001-5099, 5100-5196+, 5200-5290+, 5300-5387+

The Red Flag 1 (Korean: 붉은기1, Pulg'ŭn'gi-1) and Red Flag 2 (붉은기2, Pulg'ŭn'gi-2) class locomotives are multi-purpose electric locomotives built by the Kim Jong Thae Electric Locomotive Complex and operated by the North Korean State Railway.

As a result of its being one of the first successes of the Ch'ŏllima Movement, along with being the most numerous of all locomotive types on North Korea's railways, it has become a distinctive symbol of North Korea, featured on postage stamps, propaganda posters, at the Arirang Festival, and even a mural at a station of the P'yŏngyang Metro. In 2001, Kim Jong Il awarded the Hero of Labour title to the Red Flag 1 class in recognition of its long-standing service, and the type has also been awarded the Order of the Red Banner Of the Three Great Revolutions three times.

== Red Flag 1 (붉은기1) ==
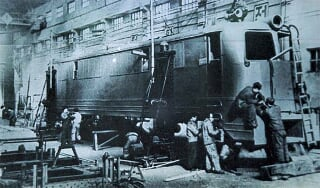
Prototype of the Red Flag 1-class electric locomotive under construction

When Korea was partitioned after the end of the Second World War, the Korean State Railway had inherited a number of Japanese-built electric locomotives (the Toshiba-built DeRoI type being the most numerous) from its colonial-era predecessor, the Chosen Government Railway. Following the end of the Korean War, the railway network underwent large-scale reconstruction, part of which was the expansion of electrification.

Expanding electrification of North Korea's rail network meant that the fifteen locomotives inherited from the Chosen Government Railway would be insufficient, As a result, the Ministry of Railways bought a number of new electric locomotives from Czechoslovakia in the mid 1950s (the Škoda Type 22E_{2}). Political concerns, such as desire for self-reliance and the then-ongoing Ch'ŏllima Movement, however, led to the decision to undertake mass production domestically. To this end, a license to build the Škoda Type 30E was bought, including technology transfer. A number were built to the original design, but the primary focus was on the development of a larger, indigenous design based on the Type 30E. The result was the Red Flag 1 (붉은기1, Pulg'ŭn'gi 1), designed by a team led by Chŏn Chae-yun. This was a universal locomotive considerably larger than the Type 30E, with Co'Co' axle arrangement and distinctive body work featuring a rounded front end and trapezoidal, inset cab windows The traction motors, transformers, auxiliary motors, master controller and other components used on the first prototype were imported from the USSR or China.

Production of the Red Flag 1 began at the Kim Chong-t'ae Electric Locomotive Works in 1961. The first prototype rolled off the assembly line on 30 August 1961; Kim Il Sung visited the plant for the occasion and chose the locomotive's name personally. The first production unit entered service on 14 January 1962, and another twenty were built that year. Thirty more followed in 1963, and production continued steadily thereafter. Since then, the first Red Flag 1 produced has remained in operation with the Tanchon Railway Bureau, in the Tanchon Youth Engine Service Brigade and has been awarded the Hero of Labour, thrice Order of the Red Banner Of the Three Great Revolutions and the 'Lathe No.26' prize.

However, due to a range of problems with reliability, production facilities and methods, difficulties in reproducing key components such as the NB-410 traction motor and other complications that delayed mass production, it wasn't until 1970 that the production design was finalised. Eventually over 150 were built; in 2002 the KSR rostered 290 electric locomotives - the bulk of the motive power fleet - with the Red Flag 1 type (including variants) accounting for over half of that number. Over fifty years of operation, the Red Flag 1 class locomotives have made over 6 million kilometres in service.

The earliest Red Flag 1 units had decorative chrome striping which was mostly omitted on later units, though did occasionally resurface on subsequent units. Their distinctive features are the rounded front end with trapezoidal cab windows, and fluted skirting with smooth carbody sides. Later Red Flag 1 units deleted the chrome striping, and have a somewhat less rounded front end with more rectangular cab windows, along with fluted skirting with fluted carbody sides. The early-style Red Flag 1 units numbered in the 5000 series were all painted in the standard light blue over dark green livery, or, with a minor variation, light green over dark green; the vast majority of those numbered in the 5100 series also carry the standard livery, but one exception (5110) has been noted, painted in the orange over red "lightning" scheme. The late-style Red Flag 1 units, numbered in the 5200 and 5300 series, were likewise all painted in the standard scheme, except for certain named vehicles.

== Red Flag 2 (붉은기2) ==
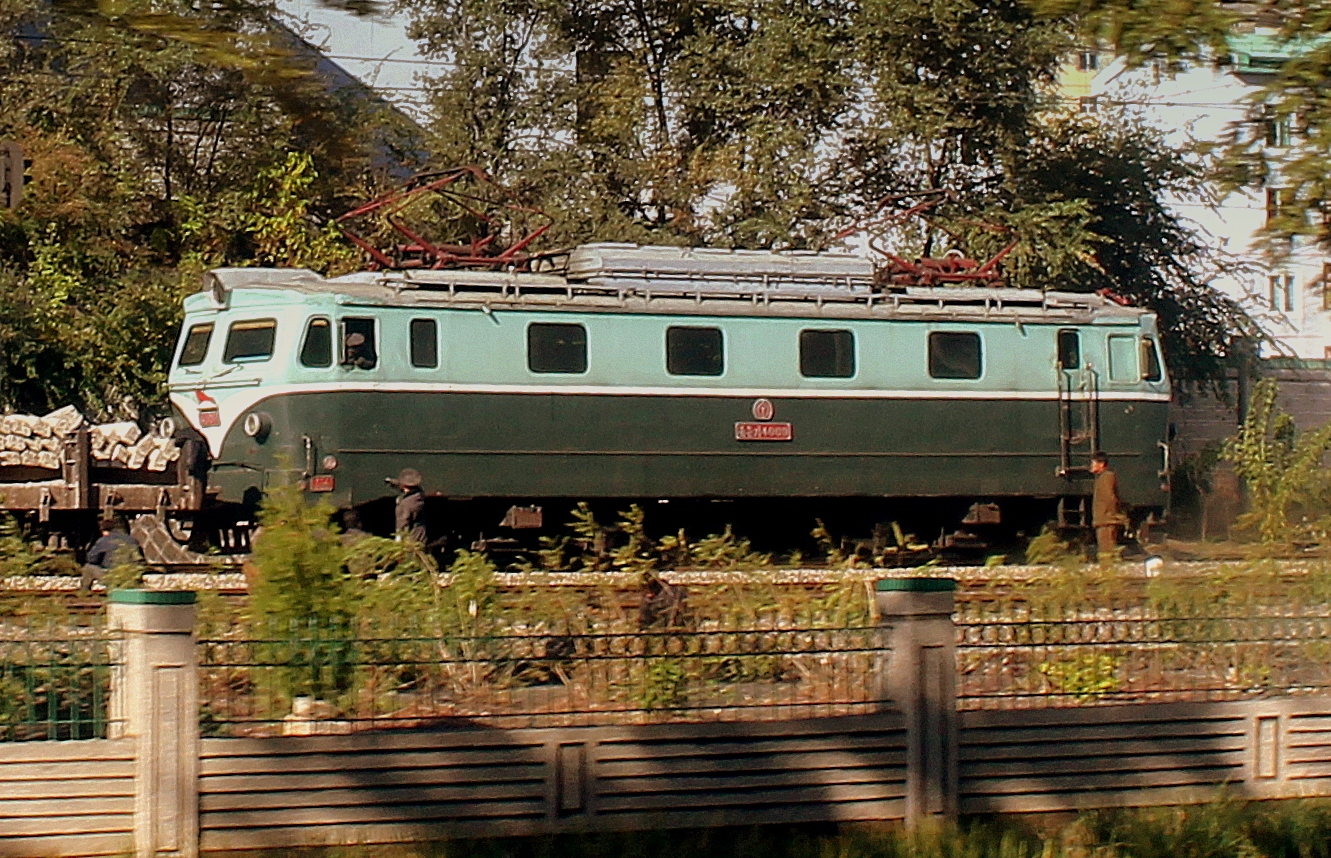
A Red Flag 2 class locomotive of the Korean State Railway in P'yŏngyang

The original design underwent a number of improvements, including a redesign of the body work; the new design had a square front end and square cab windows; this new design was given the name Red Flag 2 (붉은기2, Pulg'ŭn'gi 2). Like the later style of the Red Flag 1, the Red Flag 2 also had fluting on both the skirting and the carbody sides, and were painted in the standard livery of light blue over dark green. Red Flag 2-class unit number 5385, with the later-style square cab, was built in 1980. It also shares a close resemblance with the China Railways DF8.

== Named locomotives ==
5 March Virtue-class (오삼덕호) locomotive number 5310 at its unveiling

Parallel to the introduction of the Red Flag 2 came the Man'gyŏngdae (만경대호) class. These had late-style Red Flag 1 body work, but were geared for higher speeds for dedicated express passenger service; they were painted in a cream over red livery and numbered in the 5200 series. These produce 3,180 kilowatts (4,260 hp) and were introduced in 1980.

Over the years, many Red Flag 1 and Red Flag 2 locomotives were modernised. Upgraded and rebuilt units are given a new class name, and can be identified by the addition of the new class name in large lettering - either painted on or using characters cut out of metal. These include:

- Fatherland Reunification-class (조국동일호, Choguk Tong'il-ho) - rebuilt from early Red Flag 1 class. Two units known, one (5048) in standard light blue over dark green livery, the other in cream over red;
- Fatherland Reunification Youth-class (조국동일소년호, Choguk Tong'il Sonyŏn-ho) - rebuilt from early Red Flag 1 class. Several known, three (5050 plus two others) in cream over red or red and orange livery, one (5070) in standard light blue over dark green, and one (5057) in the orange over red "lightning" scheme;
- Fatherland Reunification Kim Ju Ryol (조국동일김주렬호, Choguk Tong'il Kim Ju Ryol-ho), built 1958/10/15,
- Youth Speed Offensive-class (속도전청년호, Sokdojŏn Ch'ŏngnyŏn-ho) - rebuilt from late Red Flag 1 class. Two known (5004, 5105), painted in standard livery; 5105 was one of the first locomotives to receive LED headlights.
- Kŭmgol Youth-class (금골소년호, Kŭmgol Sonyŏn-ho) - rebuilt from late Red Flag 1 class. One known (5200), painted in standard livery;
- Ch'ŏllima March-class (천리마진군호, Ch'ollima Chin'gun-ho) - rebuilt from late Red Flag 1 class. One known (5208?), painted in a light yellow-white-dark yellow-wine red livery;
- 5 March Loyalty-class (5.3충성호, O-Sam Ch'ungsŏng-ho) - rebuilt from Red Flag 2 class. One unit known (5333), painted in the standard livery and carrying a plaque to commemorate its inspection by Kim Jong Il;
- Loyalty-class (충성호, Chungsong-ho) - one unit known (5098) painted in blue over dark green, based on the Red Flag 2 class;
- Osandok-class (오산덕호, O-San Dŏk-ho) - rebuilt from Red Flag 1 class. One unit known (5310), painted in a pink and red variant of the standard livery and carrying a plaque to commemorate its inspection by Kim Jong Il. Osandok is the birthplace of Kim Jong-suk;
- 3 Revolutions Red Flag-class (3혁명붉은기호, Sam Hyŏngmyŏng Pulg'ŭn'gi-ho) - rebuilt from Red Flag 2 class. Six units known, three (5340, 5364, 6387) in standard light blue over dark green, one (5367) in cream over red, and two (5311 and one other) in the orange over red "lightning" scheme; another unique variant exists with each single headlight replaced with a twin headlight mount, has chrome trims and is fitted with two small windows on either side of the top headlight.
- 2nd Grand Ch'ŏllima March-class (제2의 천리마대진군호, Che-i-ŭi Ch'ollima Taejin'gun-ho) - in 1999 the KCNA announced the construction of a new class of electric locomotives with this name by the Kim Chŏng-t'ae Electric Locomotive Works, and stated that they were to be deployed to the locomotive depots at Kilju, Hŭich'ŏn and Kowŏn. Three known so far (5378, 5379, 5380), painted in the standard livery of light blue over dark green.
- Laborer-class (로동자호, Rodongja-ho) - rebuilt from Red Flag 2 class. One unit known (5378), painted in the standard livery, and one (5388) in cream/red.
- Mt. Paektu Secret Camp-class (백두밀영호, Paektumiryong-ho), one unit known (5368) painted in cream/red;
- Pioneer-class (소년호, Sonyon-ho), one unit known (5287) in standard paint, featured in Myself in the Distant Future;
- Chollima Youth of Pyongyang Somun People's School-class (천리마평양서문인민학교소년호, Chollimapyongyangsomuninminhakkyosonyon-ho), one unit known (5206) painted in standard livery;
- Children's Union-class (아동단호, Adongdan-ho), one unit known with unknown number painted in blue over dark green.
- Socialist Working Youth-class (사회주의로동청년호, Sahoejuuirodongchongnyon-ho) one unit with unknown number in cream over red, another in standard light blue over dark green numbered 5039;
- Named in honour of Speed Offensive Socialist Working Youth (《속도전》 사로청호, Sokdojon Sarochong-ho), one unit with unknown number;
- Paektusan (⟪백두산⟫호, Paektusan-ho), one unit (5272) painted in cream over red.
- Double Chollima-award Workteam (2중 천리마 작업반, i-chung Chollima Chakoppan), number 5121,
- Chollima Workteam (천리마 작업반, Chollima Chakoppan),

== Numbering ==
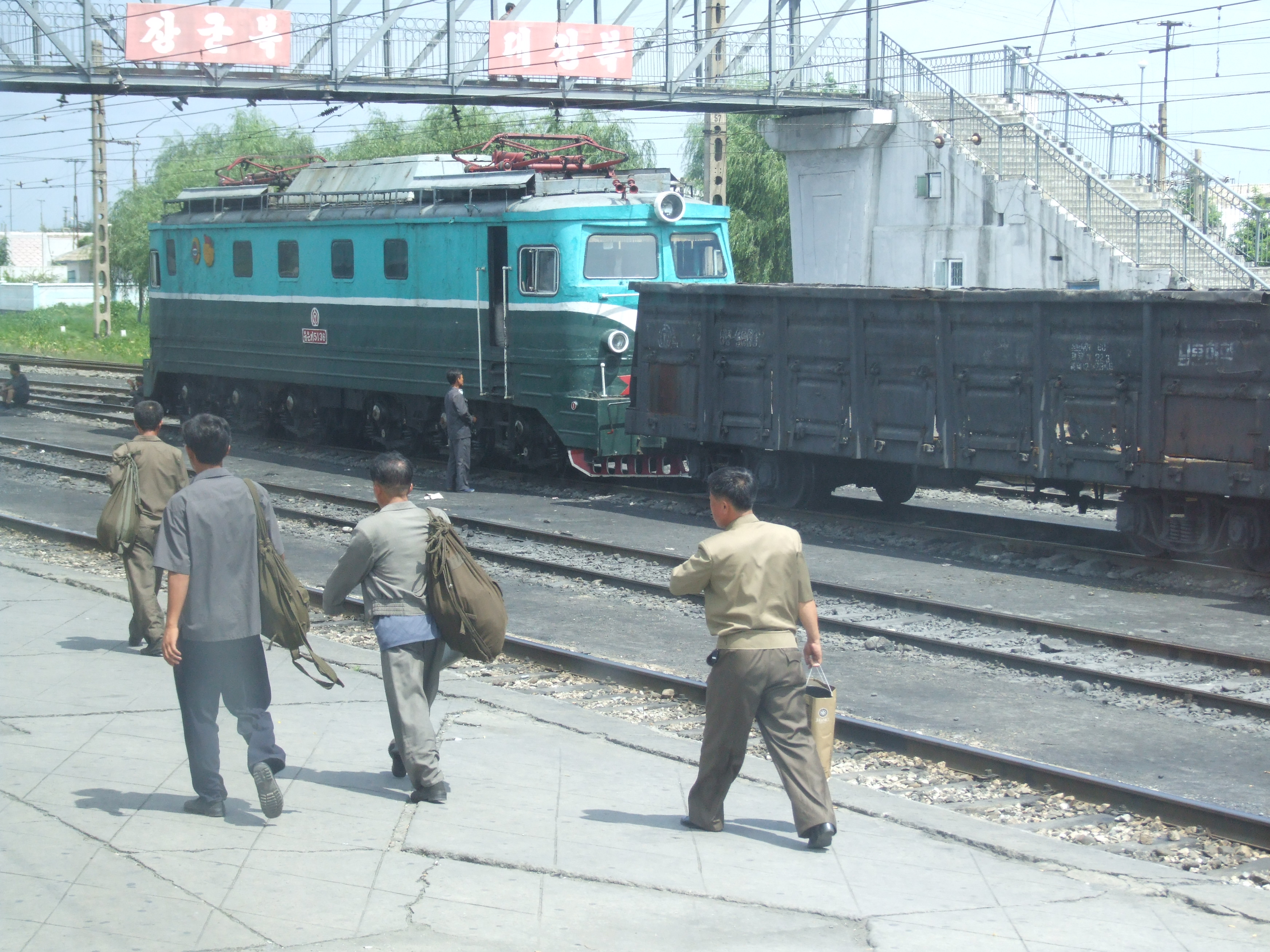
Red Flag 1 class 붉은기5136 in Sinanju

Running numbers are allotted in the 5000, 5100, 5200 and 5300 series, but the assignment seems haphazard, with many units of Red Flag 2 design carrying lower serial numbers than some Red Flag 1 units.

The 5000 series consists entirely of early-style Red Flag 1, and the 5100 series is almost entirely early-style Red Flag 1, with one anomalous unit of Red Flag 2 design (5103); this may be a case of a scrapped unit's number being reassigned. The 5200 and 5300 series are a mix of late-style Red Flag 1, Red Flag 2 and Man'gyŏngdae-class units. While it is possible that 387 locomotives were built, with simultaneous production of both designs, it seems more likely that as the Red Flag 2 were being built, existing units of the Red Flag 1 type were rebuilt internally to Red Flag 2 standard and given new running numbers. This would fit better with the information that around 150 units were built in total. However, to add to the confusion, over the years many units were upgraded and rebuilt, and given new class names, whilst retaining their original running number.
