= Line 2 (Nantong Rail Transit) =

Metro line in Nantong, China

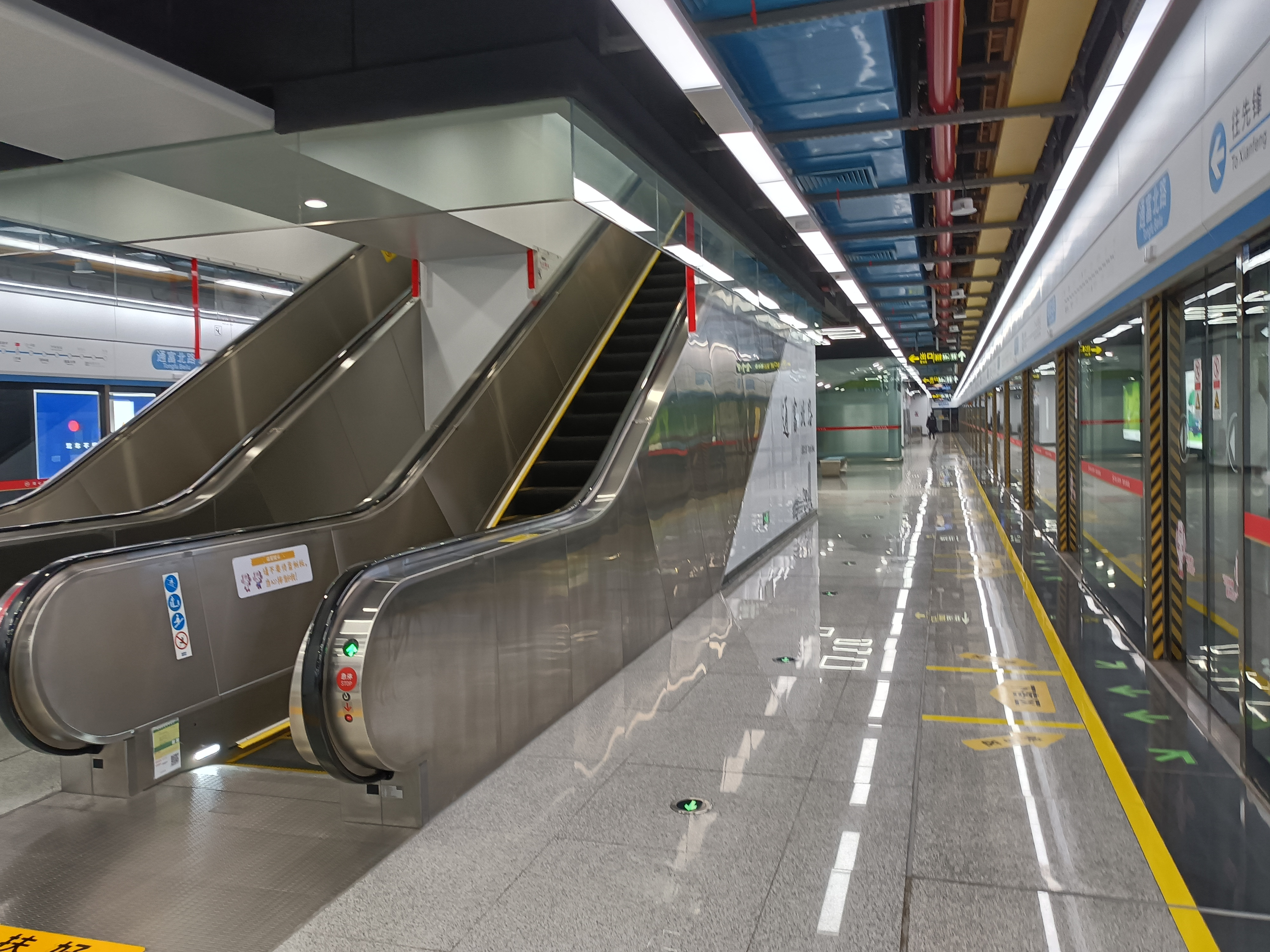
- Platform of Tongfu Beilu

Overview
- Status: Operational
- Locale: Nantong, Jiangsu, China
- Termini: Xingfu; Xianfeng

Service
- Type: Rapid transit
- System: Nantong Rail Transit

History
- Opened: 27 December 2023; 2 years ago

Technical
- Line length: 20.85 kilometres (12.96 mi)
- Character: Underground
- Track gauge: 1,435 mm (4 ft 8 1/2 in)

Line 2 of the Nantong Rail Transit (Chinese: 南通轨道交2号线; pinyin: Nántōng Guǐdào Jiāotōng èr hào xiàn) is a rapid transit line in Nantong, Jiangsu, China. It runs from Xingfu station to Xianfeng station. The line is 20.85 kilometres (13.0 mi) in length with 17 underground stations.

== History ==
Construction began on October 26, 2018. Test operation started on June 19, 2023, with trial-ride activity taking place December 8 to 10 the same year. The line started operation on December 27, 2023. Nantong Railway Station opened on October 28, 2026.

== Stations ==
Station name		Connections	Location
English	Chinese	Connections	Location
Xingfu	幸福		Chongchuan
Nantong Railway Station	南通火车站	NUH	Chongchuan
Chang'an	长岸		Chongchuan
Bei Dajie	北大街		Chongchuan
Beicheng Bridge	北城大桥		Chongchuan
Zhongxiu Xilu	钟秀西路		Chongchuan
Hepingqiao	和平桥	1	Chongchuan
Sports Park	体育公园		Chongchuan
Yijiaqiao	易家桥		Chongchuan
Wenfeng	文峰	1	Chongchuan
Wuyi Lu	五一路		Chongchuan
Yuanlin Lu	园林路		Chongchuan
East Coach Station	汽车东站		Chongchuan
Tongfu Beilu	通富北路		Chongchuan
Guanyinshan	观音山		Chongchuan
Nantongdong Railway Station	南通东站	NWH	Tongzhou
Xianfeng	先锋		Tongzhou
