= Central China Railway =

Railway company in Japanese-occupied China

Central China Railway 華中鉄道株式会社 華中鐵道股份有限公司
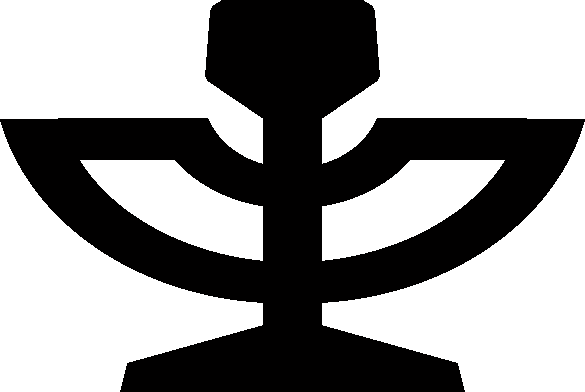

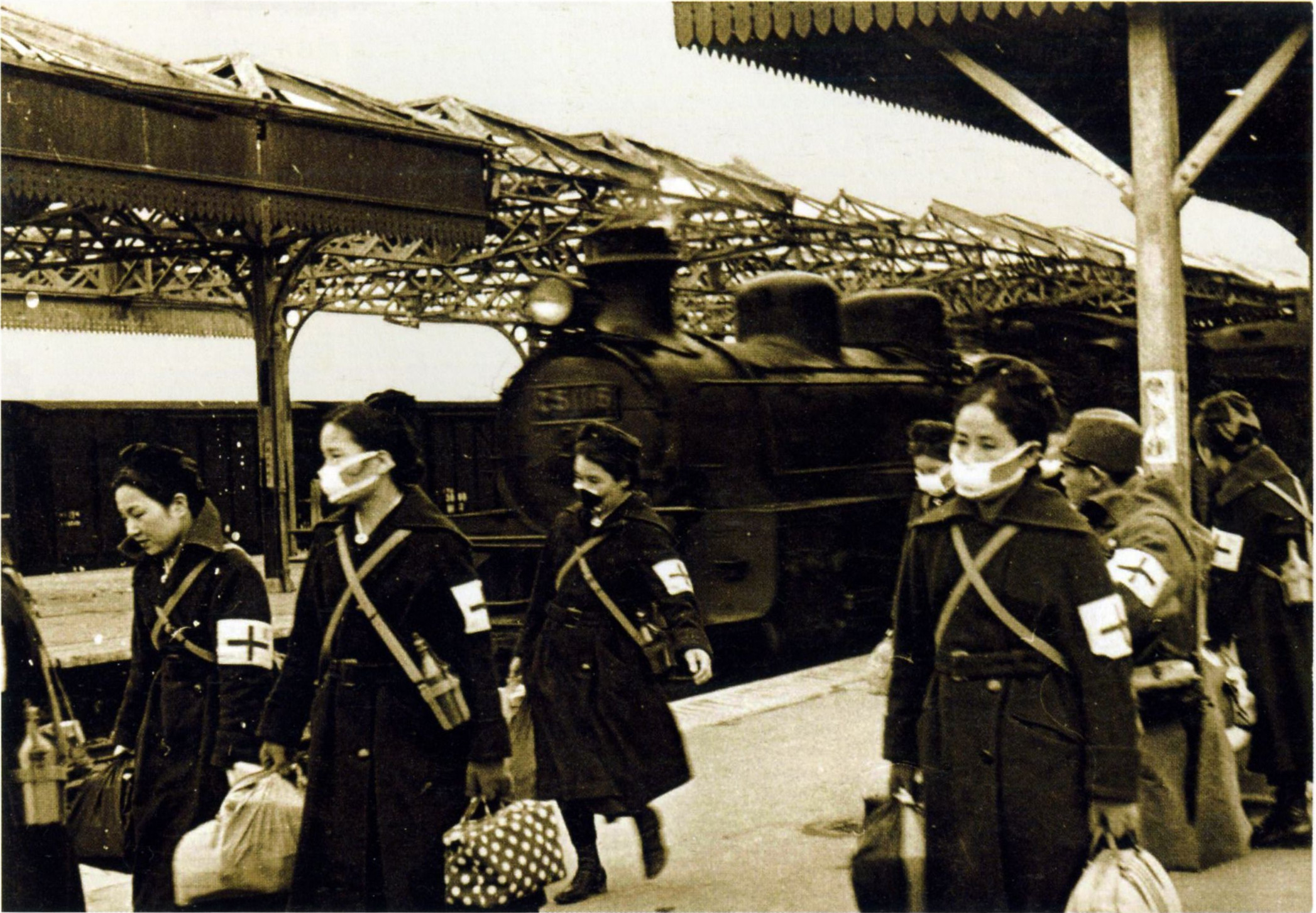
- Central China Railway locomotive C51 116 at Suzhou Station, 30 January 1939.
- Native name: 華中鉄道株式会社 華中鐵道股份有限公司
- Romanized name: Kachū Tetsudō Kabushiki Kaisha; Huázhōng Tiědào Gǔfèn Yǒuxiàn Gōngsī
- Type: Joint-stock company
- Industry: Railway
- Founded: 30 April 1939
- Defunct: August 1945
- Headquarters: Shanghai, Republic of China
- Area served: east-central China
- Services: Railway transport
- Total equity: 50 million yen

The Central China Railway (Japanese: 華中鉄道株式会社, Kachū Tetsudō Kabushiki Kaisha; Chinese: 華中鐵道股份有限公司, Huázhōng Tiědào Gǔfèn Yǒuxiàn Gōngsī) was a railway company in Japanese-occupied China established during the Second Sino-Japanese War. It was a joint venture between Japan, the Reformed Government of the Republic of China and the Nanjing National Government. Together with the North China Transportation Company, it was responsible for management of China's railways during the Japanese occupation. In reality, it was a Japanese National Policy Company.

It ceased to exist after the Japanese defeat in the Pacific War and was absorbed by the Republic of China Railway, eventually becoming part of China Railway in 1949 after the establishment of the People's Republic.

== Overview ==
While the North China Transportation Company was influenced heavily by its parent company, the South Manchuria Railway (Mantetsu), the Central China Railway was strongly influenced by the Japanese Government Railways, as a result of a large number of JGR engineers and officials being sent to work at the Central China Railway's Shanghai offices and to assemble steam locomotives.

== Routes ==
- Haihang Branch Line (海杭支線) - Xinlonghua–South Shanghai
- Huainan Line (淮南線) - Yuxikou–Tianjiaan
- Huhang Line (滬杭線) - Shanghai–Hangzhou
- Jinghu Line (京滬線) - Nanjing−Shanghai
- Jinpu Trunk Line (津浦幹線) - Xuzhou–Pukou (passenger service Xuzhou–Tianjin via North China Transport)
- Nanning Line (滬杭線) - Nanjing–Wanzhi
- Sujia Line (蘇嘉線) - Suzhou–Jiaxing
- Wusong Line (呉淞線) - Shanghai–Paotaiwan
- Wusong Branch Line (呉淞支線) - Shanghai–Xinxing
- Wuyi Line (武義線) - Jinhua–Wuyi
- Zhegan Line (浙赣線) - Hangzhou–Jinhua

== Services ==
In addition to the usual first, second and third-class passenger equipment seen elsewhere, the Central China Railway had fourth class carriages as well. These were newly built with the structure of a covered goods wagon adapted for passenger use, intended for use by poor Chinese farmers and seasonal workers. Conditions in these cars were remarkably poor, with passengers on two levels, but because the fare was very inexpensive, they were sufficient to the needs. Chinese were permitted to travel in first class if they paid the full fare, but Japanese were not permitted to travel in fourth class.

After the damage from the Sino-Japanese war was repaired, high-end direct services were put into operation in conjunction with North China Transport, such as the "Temma" and "Hiryū" limited express trains between Shanghai and Nanjing. In November 1942, this 311 km (193 mi) distance was covered in 5 hours 20 minutes, with an average train speed of 58.31 km/h (36.23 mph).

== Rolling stock ==
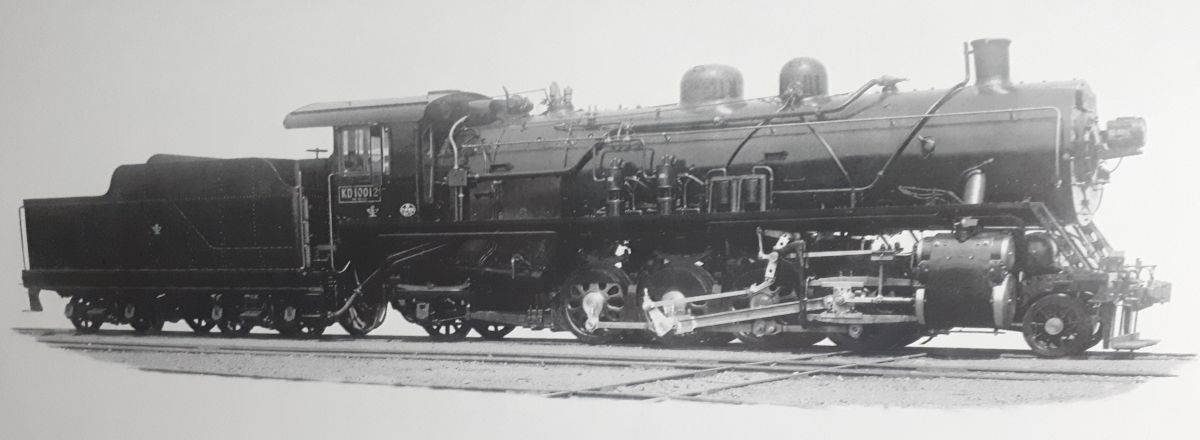
Builder's photo of Central China Railway locomotive KD10012

When the Central China Railway was established, it suffered from a severe motive power shortage, as when the Chinese National Government forces withdrew, they destroyed a great number of locomotives, leaving only limited numbers of types inherited from nationalised railways, such as the Huainan Railway 300 class. To alleviate this shortage, JGR locomotives were converted from Japanese narrow gauge (1,067 mm (3 ft 6.0 in) to standard gauge and shipped to China. Among these were JGR Class 9600 2-8-0 steam locomotives, and as these proved to be very easy to regauge, 251 were sent to China for use on both the Central China Railway (as Soriro class, ソリロ) and North China Transport's rail lines; after the Pacific War, these became China Railway class KD5.

In 1939, sixteen JGR Class C51 locomotives, C51 8, 28, 30, 33 - 35, 88, 95, 96, 116, 130 - 132, 173, 175, and 178, all equipped with a Sumiyama feedwater heater, were converted to standard gauge and sent to the Central China Railway, where they operated primarily between Nanjing and Shanghai; these were later redesignated パシナ (Pashina) class. After the Liberation of China and the establishment of the People's Republic, these became China Railway class ㄆㄒ9 (PX9) in 1951, and reclassified as class SL9 in 1959.

At the same time, JGR D50 193 was also converted to standard gauge and shipped to the Central China Railway. After the establishment of the PRC, it was classified ㄇㄎ16 (MK16), but was off the roster by 1955.

Subsequently, the Central China Railway received newly built locomotives, such as the eight KC100 class 4-6-2s (KC1001–KC1008), 19 KD100 class 2-8-2s (KD1001−KD1019), the 10 Pashishi class identical to the Chosen Government Railway (Sentetsu) Pashishi class (パシシ11–パシシ19, and パシシ110), and the 38 Mikasa class identical to the Sentetsu Mikasa class (ミカサ11–ミカサ19, ミカサ110–ミカサ137, ミカサ310).

Like the locomotive fleet, the Central China Railway's inventory of passenger carriages and goods wagons was left in shambles after the withdrawal of the Chinese army. As an emergency measure, 126 JGR carriages were converted to standard gauge and shipped to China. These were of the Oshi27730 (3 cars), Naro20700 (8), Naha22000 (35), Nahafu24000 (37), Oni26600 (5), Suro33 (9), Suha32 (22), and Suhafu32 (7) classes. From 1940, new passenger carriages and goods wagons were built for the Central China Railway to Mantetsu designs. Many of these remained in service with the China Railway after the end of the Pacific War.

Ten Kiha40000 and ten Kiha42000 class railcars were delivered for suburban services.
