= Nantong West railway station =

Railway station in Nantong, Jiangsu

Nantong West 南通西
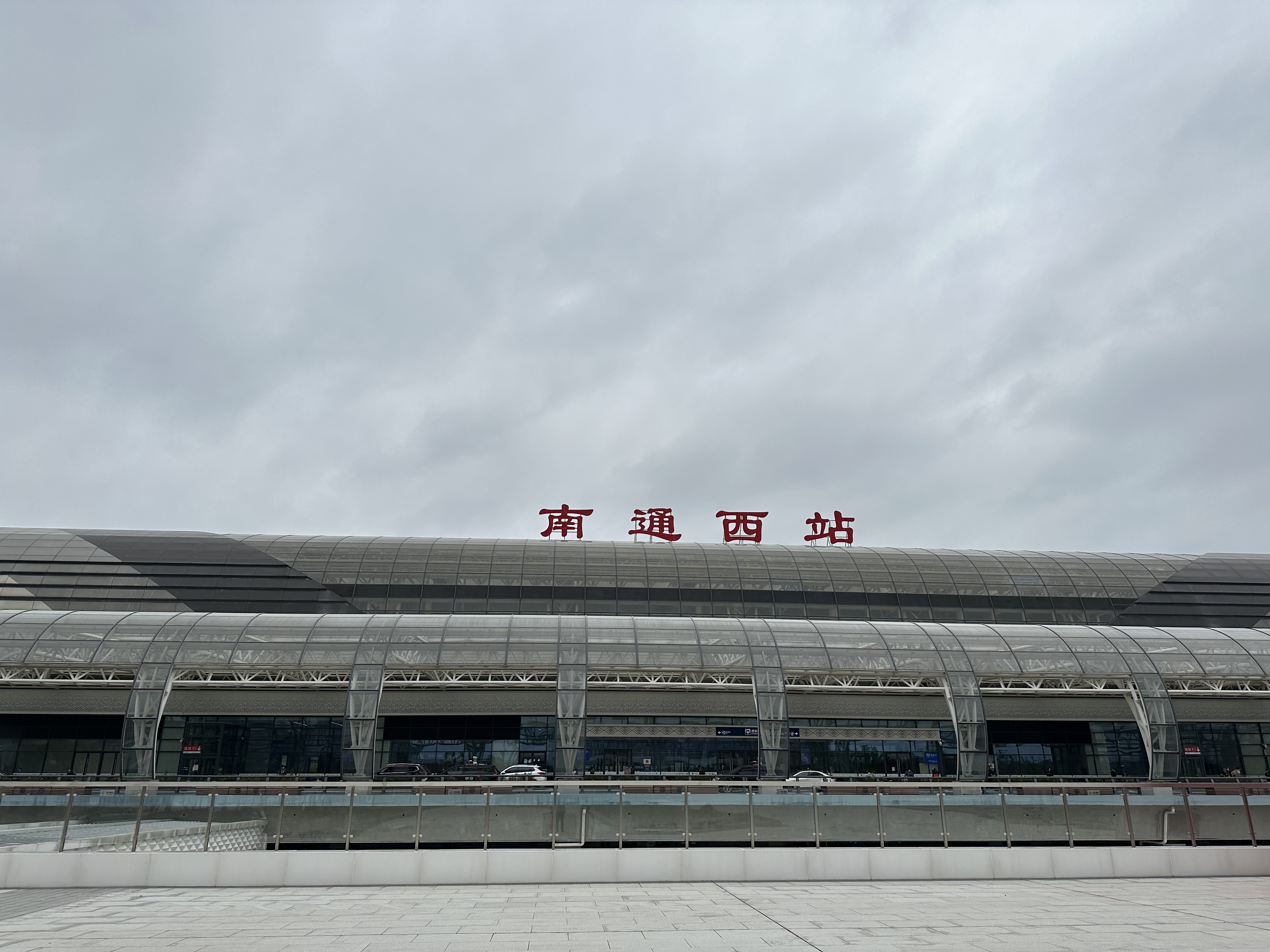

General information
- Location: Tongzhou District, Nantong, Jiangsu; China
- Coordinates: 32.1036°N 120.7611°E
- Lines: Yancheng–Nantong high-speed railway Shanghai–Suzhou–Nantong railway Nantong–Ningbo high-speed railway (U/C)

History
- Opened: 1 July 2020
Location

Nantong West railway station (Chinese: 南通西站) is a railway station in Tongzhou District, Nantong, Jiangsu, China.

== History ==
This station opened with the Shanghai–Suzhou–Nantong railway on 1 July 2020. The Yancheng–Nantong high-speed railway was opened in Yancheng–Nantong high-speed railway 2020.

== Future ==
The under construction Nantong–Ningbo high-speed railway will include a stop here.

== Metro station ==
Nantong Metro Line 1 has served this station since 10 November 2022.

== See also ==
- Nantong railway station
