= Nantong Rail Transit =

Rail transit system in Nantong, Jiangsu, China

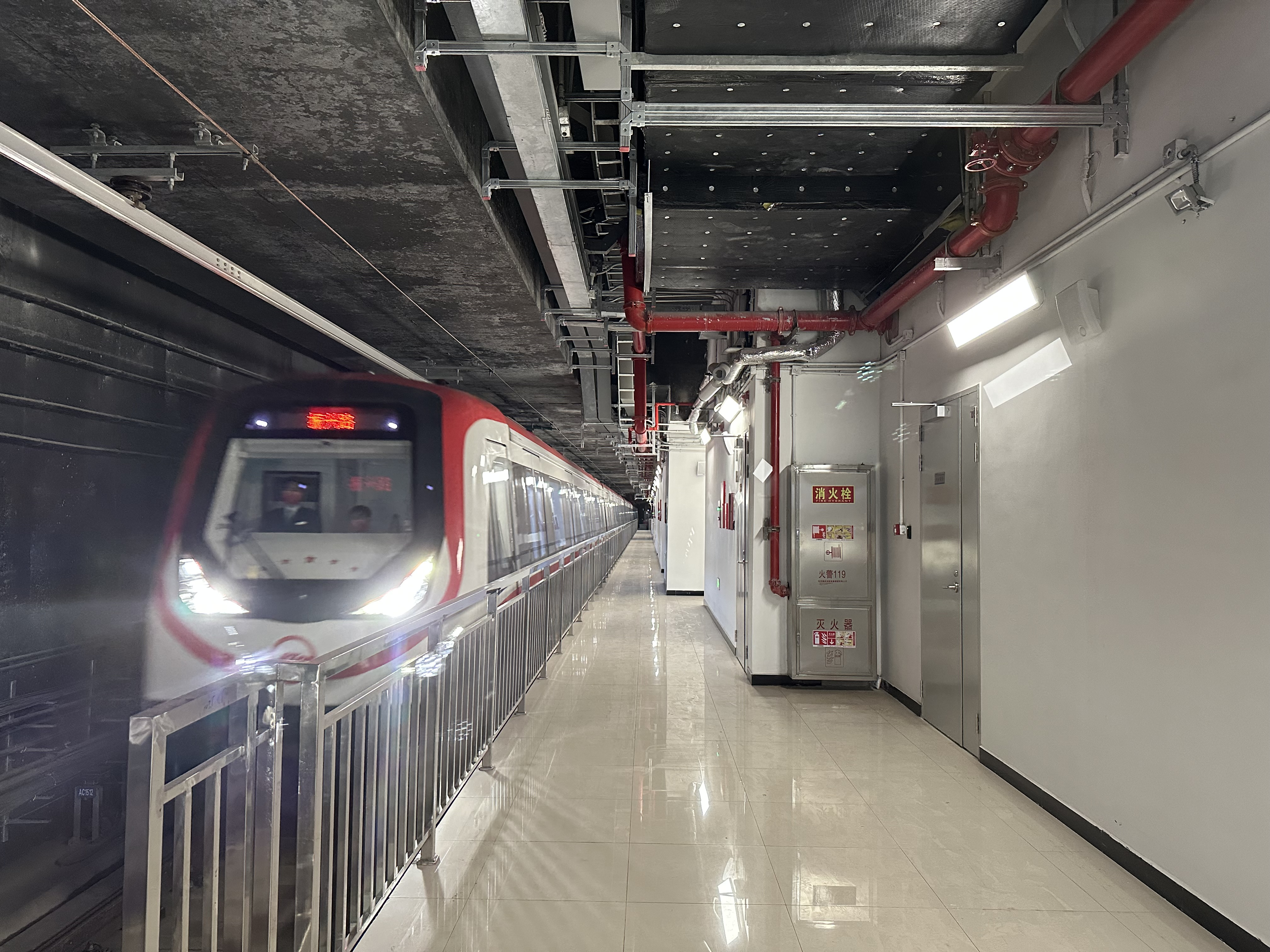

Overview
- Native name: 南通轨道交通
- Locale: Nantong, Jiangsu, China
- Transit type: Rapid transit
- Number of lines: 2 (in operation)
- Number of stations: 45 (in operation)

Operation
- Began operation: 10 November 2022; 4 years ago
- Operators: Nantong Rail Transit Co., Ltd.
- Character: Underground (Lines 1 & 2)

Technical
- System length: 60.03 km
System map

Nantong Rail Transit (Chinese: 南通轨道交通; pinyin: Nántōng Guǐdào Jiāotōng) is a rapid transit system in Nantong, Jiangsu Province, China.

In August 2014, China's National Development and Reform Commission approved Nantong Rail Transit's short-term (2014-2020) construction plan, including Line 1 and Line 2.

== History ==
In October 2011, the third meeting of the Standing Committee of the Municipal People's Congress of Nantong City launched the "Nantong Urban Rail Transit Planning Work" plan. In April 2012, the Nantong Rail Transit plan was released and circulated online.

On 19 August 2014, Nantong's urban rail rapid transit construction plan was approved by the National Development and Reform Commission, becoming the sixth in Jiangsu and the 37th city in mainland China approved for rapid transit.

== Lines in operation ==

Line	Terminals (District)		Commencement	Length km	Stations
1	Pingchao (Tongzhou)	Zhenxing Lu (Chongchuan)	10 November 2022	39.18	28
2	Xingfu (Chongchuan)	Xianfeng (Tongzhou)	27 December 2023	20.85	17
Total				60.03	45

=== Line 1 ===
Line 1's construction began on 18 December 2017, and opened on 10 November 2022. Line 1 begins at Pingchao Station (平潮站) and ends at Zhenxing Lu Station (振兴路站). The line is 39.182 kilometres (24.3 mi) long, with 28 underground stations.

=== Line 2 ===
Construction for Line 2 began on 26 October 2018. Line 2 is 20.85 km long, with 17 stations. It opened on 27 December 2023.

== Long-term planning ==
Eventually, Nantong Rail Transit will consist of 4 rapid transit lines with a total length of 170.8 kilometres (106.1 mi) and several commuter rail lines totaling 153.2 kilometres (95.2 mi).
