= Nantong–Suzhou–Jiaxing–Ningbo high-speed railway =

Proposed high-speed railway in China

Overview
- Native name: 通苏嘉甬铁路
- Status: Planned
- Owner: CR Shanghai
- Locale: Jiangsu province; Zhejiang province
- Termini: Nantong West; Fenghua and Ningbo

Service
- System: China Railway High-speed
- Operator(s): CR Shanghai

History
- Planned opening: 2027

Technical
- Line length: 332 km (206 mi)
- Track gauge: 1,435 mm (4 ft 8 1/2 in) standard gauge
- Electrification: 25 kV 50 Hz AC (Overhead line)
- Operating speed: 350 km/h (217 mph)

The Nantong–Suzhou–Jiaxing–Ningbo high-speed railway or Tongsujiayong high-speed railway (Chinese: 通苏嘉甬铁路; pinyin: Tōng-Sū-Jiā-Yǒng tiělù, "Tong", "Su", "Jia" and "Yong" being the abbreviations for Nantong, Suzhou, Jiaxing and Ningbo, respectively) is a high-speed railway line between Nantong and Ningbo in China. It is expected to open in 2027.

The railway is expected to reduce the journey time from Ningbo to Suzhou and Shanghai to around one hour.

== History ==
In October 2020, geological surveys began in preparation for the construction of a bridge across Hangzhou Bay which will carry the railway.

Construction on the railway started on 30 November 2022.

== Route ==
The line takes new north–south route which bypasses Shanghai, instead heading via Suzhou, Jiaxing, and Cixi. The total length of the line is 310 kilometres (190 mi), of which 301 kilometres (187 mi) will be newly built. The line crosses the Yangtze River via two tracks of the four-track Hutong Yangtze River Bridge. The other two tracks carry the Nantong–Shanghai railway.

It is however not the first railway to travel between Suzhou and Jiaxing. The Suzhou–Jiaxing railway operated from the 1930s to 1944.

Station Name	Chinese	Metro transfers/connections	Location	
Nantong West	南通西	1	Nantong	Jiangsu
Zhangjiagang	张家港		Suzhou	Jiangsu
Changshu West	常熟西		Suzhou	Jiangsu
Suzhou North	苏州北	2	Suzhou	Jiangsu
Suzhou South	苏州南		Suzhou	Jiangsu
Jiaxing North	嘉兴北		Jiaxing	Zhejiang
Jiaxing South	嘉兴南		Jiaxing	Zhejiang
Haiyan West	海盐西		Jiaxing	Zhejiang
Cixi	慈溪	Ningci	Ningbo	Zhejiang
Zhuangqiao	庄桥	4	Ningbo	Zhejiang
Ningbo	宁波	2 4	Ningbo	Zhejiang
Ningbo West	宁波西	2 6 9 12	Ningbo	Zhejiang
Fenghua	奉化	3	Ningbo	Zhejiang
