= Line 1 (Nantong Rail Transit) =

Metro line in Nantong, China

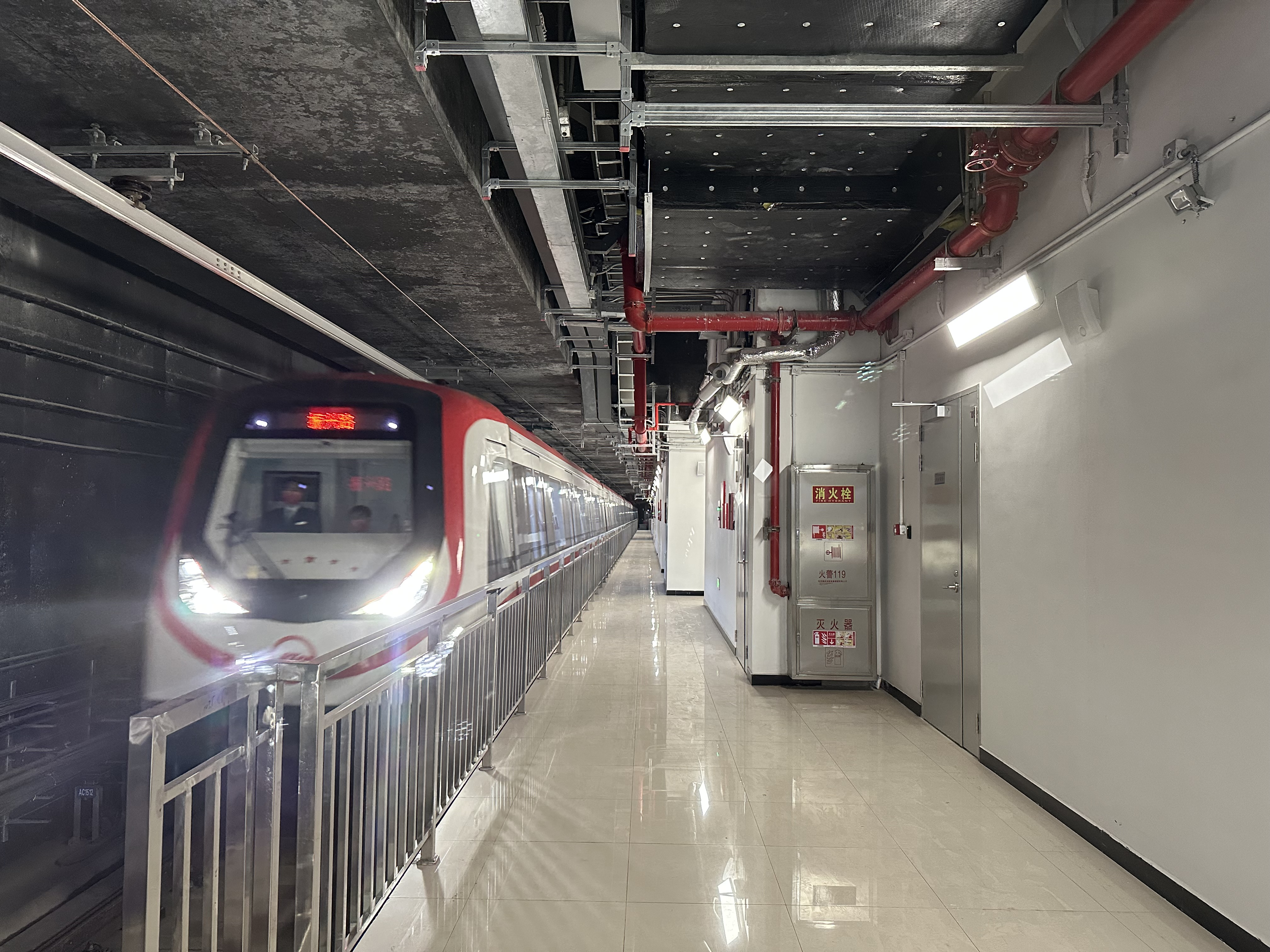
- The train of Nantong Rail Transit Line 1

Overview
- Status: Operational
- Locale: Nantong, Jiangsu, China
- Termini: Pingchao; Zhenxing Lu

Service
- Type: Rapid transit
- System: Nantong Rail Transit

History
- Opened: 10 November 2022; 3 years ago

Technical
- Line length: 39.182 kilometres (24.347 mi)
- Character: Underground
- Track gauge: 1,435 mm (4 ft 8 1/2 in)

Line 1 of the Nantong Rail Transit (Chinese: 南通轨道交通1号线; pinyin: Nántōng Guǐdào Jiāotōng yī hào xiàn) is a rapid transit line in Nantong, Jiangsu, China. It runs from Pingchao station (平潮站) to Zhenxing Lu station (振兴路站). The line is 39.182 kilometres (24.3 mi) in length with 28 underground stations.

== History ==
Construction began on December 18, 2017. On May 9, 2022, the line started running without passengers. During September 23-24 and November 5-6, the line started trial-ride activity. The line started operation on November 10, 2022.

== Stations ==
Station name		Connections	Location
English	Chinese	Connections	Location
Pingchao	平潮		Tongzhou
Nantongxi Railway Station	南通西站	China Railway China Railway High-speed	Tongzhou
Jichengcun	集成村		Chongchuan
Hekou	河口		Chongchuan
Tangzha Park	唐闸公园		Chongchuan
Puxian Lu	普贤路		Chongchuan
Shilifang	十里坊		Chongchuan
Chenggang Lu	城港路		Chongchuan
Shuguang	曙光		Chongchuan
Cha'an Dian	茶庵殿		Chongchuan
Hai'er Xiang	孩儿巷		Chongchuan
Hepingqiao	和平桥	2	Chongchuan
Youyiqiao	友谊桥		Chongchuan
Xuetian	学田		Chongchuan
Wenfeng	文峰	2	Chongchuan
Charity Museum	慈善博物馆		Chongchuan
Government Affairs Center	政务中心		Chongchuan
Shiji Dadao	世纪大道		Chongchuan
Nantong Library	图书馆		Chongchuan
Nantong University	南通大学		Chongchuan
Panxiang Lu	盘香路		Chongchuan
Chongzhou Dadao	崇州大道		Chongchuan
Jinghai Dadao	静海大道		Chongchuan
Grand Theatre	大剧院		Chongchuan
Zilang Lake	紫琅湖		Chongchuan
NETDA Business District	能达商务区		Chongchuan
Shipping College	航运学院		Chongchuan
Zhenxing Lu	振兴路		Chongchuan

== Trains ==
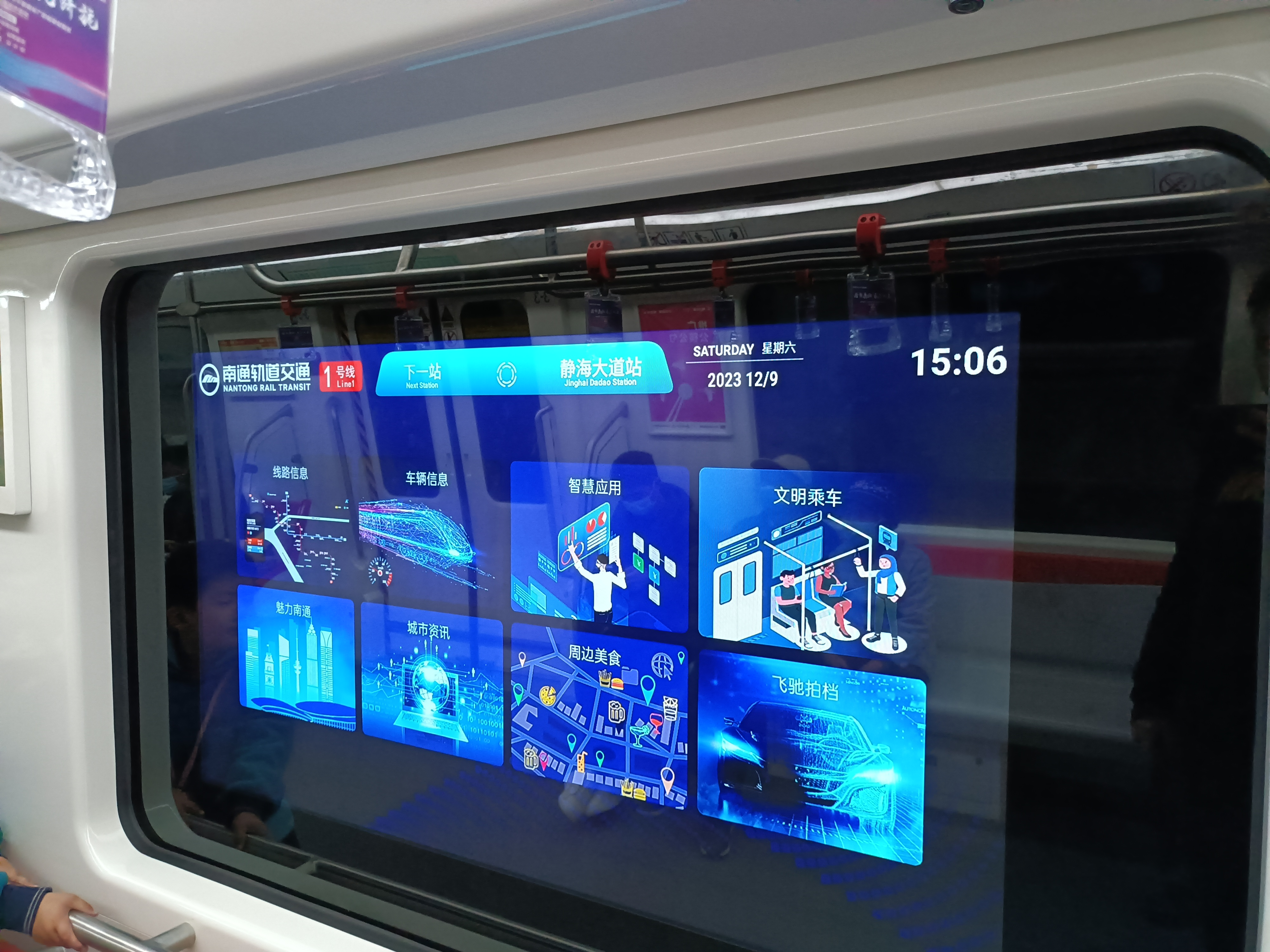
OLED smart screen of trains of Line 1

The trains of Nantong Rail Transit Line 1 can run up to 80 km/h, and hold a maximum number of 2132 passengers. Its main colors are white and red.

Among the 35 trains, 6 trains provide OLED smart windows, which provides a wide range of functions, including city information, foods nearby, line information query, train information query.。
