= China Railways JF9 =

2-8-2 Chinese steam locomotives

China Railways JF9 (解放9) Chosen Government Railway Mikasa class (ミカサ) West Chosen Central Railway Mikasa class (ミカサ) Korean National Railroad Mika3 class (미카3) Korean State Railway Migasŏ class (미가서) Central China Railway Mikasa class (ミカサ)
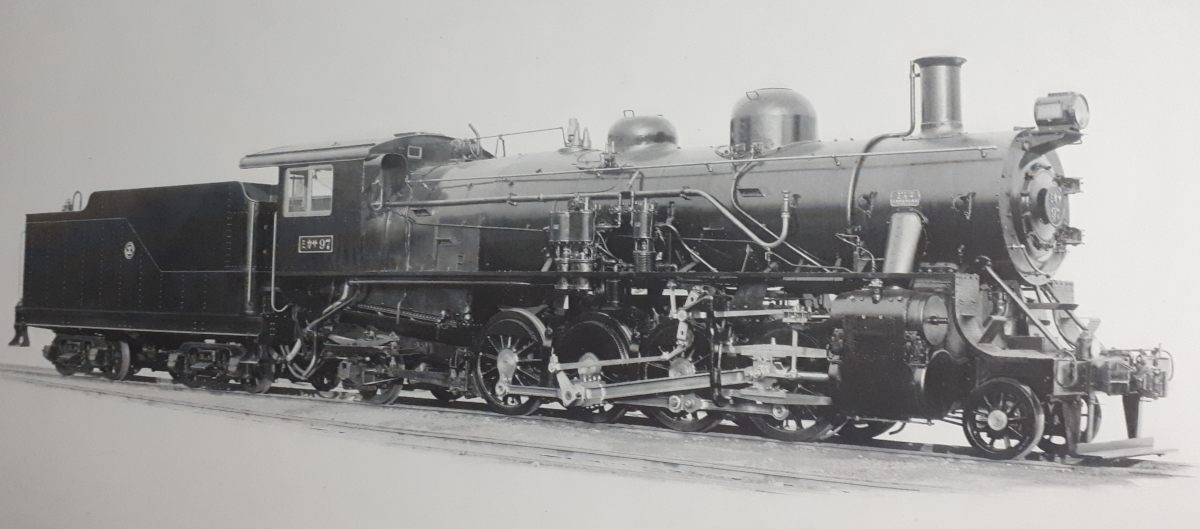
- Builder's photo of Sentetsu locomotive ミカサ97
Type and origin
- Power type: Steam
- Builder: Kisha Seizō, Nippon Sharyō, Hitachi, Kawasaki, Gyeongseong Works
- Build date: 1927–1946
- Total produced: 398
Specifications
- Configuration
  - Whyte: 2-8-2
- Gauge: 1,435 mm (4 ft 8 1/2 in)
- Driver dia.: 1,450 mm (57.09 in)
- Length: 22,035 mm (867.5 in)
- Width: 3,078 mm (10 ft 1.2 in)
- Height: 4,507 mm (14 ft 9.4 in)
- Loco weight: 90.65 t (89.22 long tons)
- Tender weight: 65.80 t (64.76 long tons)
- Fuel type: Coal
- Fuel capacity: 11.0 t (10.8 long tons) (1st); 12.0 t (11.8 long tons)
- Water cap.: 22.7 m^{3} (6,000 US gal) (1st); 28.0 m^{3} (7,400 US gal)
- Firebox
  - Grate area: 4.75 m^{2} (51.1 sq ft)
- Boiler
  - Small tubes: 118 x 51 mm (2.0 in)
  - Large tubes: 28 x 137 mm (5.4 in)
- Boiler pressure: 13.0 kgf/cm^{2} (185 psi)
- Heating surface
  - Firebox: 21.70 m^{2} (233.6 sq ft)
  - Tubes: 153.40 m^{2} (1,651.2 sq ft)
  - Total surface: 175.10 m^{2} (1,884.8 sq ft)
- Superheater
  - Heating area: 61.50 m^{2} (662.0 sq ft)
- Cylinders: Two, outside
- Cylinder size: 580 mm × 710 mm (22.835 in × 27.953 in)
- Valve gear: Walschaerts
Performance figures
- Maximum speed: 70 km/h (43 mph)
- Tractive effort: 179.0 kN (40,200 lb_{f})
Career
- Operators: Chosen Government Railway; West Chosen Central Railway; Korean National Railroad; Korean State Railway; Central China Railway; China Railway
- Class: Sentetsu, WCCR, CCR: ミカサ; KNR: 미카3; KSR: 미가서; CR: ㄇㄎ玖 (1950–1959); JF9 (解放9) (1959–)
- Number in class: Sentetsu: 308; WCCR: 8 KNR: at least 54; KSR: at least 9 CCR/CR: 38
- Numbers: Sentetsu: ミカサ1–ミカサ297, ミカサ303–ミカサ313; WCCR: ミカサ201–ミカサ208; KNR: see text KSR: 63xx (see text); CCR: ミカサ11–ミカサ19, ミカサ110–ミカサ137, ミカサ320; CR: JF9 3671–3710
- Delivered: 1927–1946
- Preserved: 5
- Disposition: 5 preserved (1 in China, 4 in South Korea), remainder scrapped

The China Railways JF9 (解放9, Jiěfàng, "liberation") class steam locomotive was a class of 2-8-2 "Mikado" type steam locomotives for freight trains operated by the China Railway. The "Mika" name came from the American naming system for steam locomotives, under which locomotives with 2-8-2 wheel arrangement were called "Mikado" in honour of the Emperor of Japan, as the first 2-8-2 locomotives in the world were built for Japan.

Of all Mika classes, 131 went to the Korean National Railroad in South Korea and 292 to the Korean State Railway in North Korea. Of these 423 locomotives, 356 were from Sentetsu; the other 67 were South Manchuria Railway Mikai-class engines on loan to Sentetsu along with Mika-type locomotives which had previously belonged to the twelve privately owned railways in Korea before 1945. Not included in this number, however, are the six SMR Mikai-class locomotives that were assigned to SMR's Rajin depot for operation on SMR's lines in northeastern Korea, and the eight SMR Mikaro-class locomotives likewise assigned to the Rajin depot; these fourteen locomotives were taken over by the Korean State Railway. Despite the DPRK government's extensive anti-Japanese propaganda, the railway nevertheless continues to use the "Mika" name officially for these locomotives even though it refers to the Japanese emperor.

The Mikasa class was also operated by the Central China Railway in Japanese-occupied China, and by the China Railway after the fall of China to communism, where they were designated JF9 class.

== Description ==
Designed by Sentetsu based on the experiences with the rebuilding of the Pureshi class, the Mikasa class, along with the Pashishi and Tehoro classes, were the first locomotives designed by Sentetsu. Because they were designed specifically for Korean operating needs and conditions, these superheated, two-cylinder locomotives were a great success and proved very easy to build, operate and maintain.

The Mikasa, Pashishi and Tehoro classes all had large heating areas. From its inception, the Mikasa class was designed to use the lignite abundant in Korea, which is less efficient than the anthracite the American-built locomotives needed. The Mikasa class featured a combustion chamber firebox to achieve sufficient combustion of the coal, which in turn improved boiler efficiency. Following the experience with the Mikasas, combustion chamber fireboxes were installed on the JNR 9700 class and JNR D52 class locomotives built from 1943. To improve maintenance logistics, care was taken during the design process to maximise the number common components between the Pashishi and Mikasa classes.

Structurally it is generally an American design in its features, with the first dome being a sandbox, and the second being for steam. The firebox is located above the trailing axle. After the first 27 were completed, the design was modified, resulting in a slightly different appearance of the smokestack and the steam dome. The tender was made bigger at the same time, with coal capacity rising from 11 t (11 long tons; 12 short tons) to 12 t (12 long tons; 13 short tons), and water capacity increasing from 22.7 m^{3} (800 cu ft) to 28.0 m^{3} (990 cu ft). The tender is a four-axle type, running on two four-wheel bogies of American Bettendorf design.

== Construction ==
Between 1927 and 1945, 308 were built for Sentetsu in Japan and Korea by five different builders, and a further five were built after the end of the Pacific War for the KNR. Prior to 1945, eight units were built for the privately owned West Chosen Central Railway, and 38 for the Central China Railway. In all, a total of 398 were built, but there were many in various states of construction at the end of the war that were never completed.

=== Chosen Government Railway ミカサ (Mikasa) class ===
The first 70, which entered Sentetsu service prior to April 1938, were numbered ミカサ1701 through ミカサ1770; in Sentetsu's general renumbering of 1938, these became ミカサ1 through ミカサ70. Those that entered service after April 1938 were numbered according to the new system.

The Mikasa class became Sentetsu's standard locomotive for freight trains and trains on steeper lines, especially on trunk lines such as the Gyeongui and Gyeongbu Lines. During the Pacific War, the industrialisation of northern Korea was expanded on a large scale, and to meet the resulting sharp increase in freight demands in the area, large numbers of Mikasas were assigned to work on the Gyeongwon and Hamgyeong Lines, as well.

The exact dispersal of Sentetsu's Mikasa-class locomotives after the partition of Korea is uncertain.

Timeline of Mikasa production for Sentetsu
	Running Number			
Year	Original	Post-1938	Builder	Works Number
1927	1701–1708	ミカサ1–ミカサ8	Kisha Seizō	927–930, 961–964
1928	1709–1711	ミカサ9–ミカサ11	Nippon Sharyō	207–209
1928	1712–1714	ミカサ12–ミカサ14	Hitachi	293–295
1928	1715–1717	ミカサ15–ミカサ17	Kawasaki	1251–1253
1928	1718–1720	ミカサ18–ミカサ20	Kisha Seizō	1016–1018
1930	1721–1727	ミカサ21–ミカサ27	Gyeongseong Works	8–14
1935	1728–1731	ミカサ28–ミカサ31	Hitachi	614–617
1935	1732–1735	ミカサ32–ミカサ35	Kisha Seizō	1331–1334
1936	1736–1742	ミカサ36–ミカサ42	Kisha Seizō	1382–1388
1937	1743–1747	ミカサ43–ミカサ47	Kawasaki	1844–1848
1937	1752–1765	ミカサ52–ミカサ65	Kisha Seizō	1507–1514, 1526–1531
1938	1748–1751	ミカサ48–ミカサ51	Nippon Sharyō	514–517
1938	1766–1770	ミカサ66–ミカサ70	Kisha Seizō	1539–1543
1938		ミカサ81–ミカサ93	Kisha Seizō	1643–1647, 1656–1663
1939		ミカサ71–ミカサ75	Nippon Sharyō	607–611
1939		ミカサ76–ミカサ80	Kawasaki	2118–2122
1939		ミカサ94–ミカサ99	Kisha Seizō	1672–1677
1939		ミカサ100–ミカサ103	Hitachi	1036–1039
1939		ミカサ104–ミカサ109	Kisha Seizō	1766–1771
1940		ミカサ110–ミカサ129	Kisha Seizō	1896–1905, 1936–1945
1940		ミカサ130–ミカサ147	Hitachi	1171–1188
1940		ミカサ148–ミカサ172	Nippon Sharyō	817–841
1940		ミカサ173–ミカサ179	Gyeongseong Works	64–70
1940		ミカサ180–ミカサ186	Kisha Seizō	1960–1966
1940		ミカサ187–ミカサ191	Hitachi	1324–1328
1940		ミカサ192–ミカサ196	Nippon Sharyō	842–846
1941		ミカサ197–ミカサ208	Kisha Seizō	2049–2054, 2156–2161
1942		ミカサ209–ミカサ216	Kisha Seizō	2209–2216
1942		ミカサ223–ミカサ228	Nippon Sharyō	1029–1034
1942		ミカサ248–ミカサ278	Hitachi	1621–1627, 1704–1727
1943		ミカサ217–ミカサ222	Kisha Seizō	2266–2271
1943		ミカサ229–ミカサ244	Nippon Sharyō	1142–1151, 1176–1181
1944		ミカサ245–ミカサ247	Nippon Sharyō	1261–1263
1944		ミカサ279–ミカサ297	Hitachi	1728, 1848–1855, 1945–1954
1944		ミカサ303–ミカサ313	Nippon Sharyō	1332–1342

=== West Chosen Central Railway ミカサ (Mikasa) class ===
As traffic volumes increased significantly through the Pacific War, the privately owned West Chosen Central Railway also found itself needing more power. As a result, eight Mikasa class locomotives were bought in 1943 and 1944. More were needed, but as the capacity of locomotive builders in Japan and Korea was already being stretched, Mikaro (ミカロ, Mika6) class locomotives were borrowed from the South Manchuria Railway (Mantetsu) instead.

After the partition of Korea all railways in both North and South were nationalised, and being located north of the 38th parallel, the West Chosen Central Railway's assets were taken over by the Korean State Railway.

Timeline of Mikasa production for the West Chosen Central Railway
Year	Running Number	Builder	Works Number
1943	201, 202	Hitachi	1457, 1458
1944	203–206	Kisha Seizō	2227–2230
1944	207, 208	Nippon Sharyō	1213, 1214

=== Central China Railway ミカサ (Mikasa) class ===
The Central China Railway also bought locomotives built to the Sentetsu Mikasa design; a total of 38 were built by Kisha Seizō, Hitachi and Nippon Sharyō in 1943 and 1944. These were numbered ミカサ11 through ミカサ19, ミカサ110 through ミカサ137 and ミカサ320. After the war, these eventually ended up with the China Railway.

Timeline of Mikasa production for the Central China Railway
Year	Running Numbers	Builder	Works Number
1943	ミカサ11–ミカサ15	Kisha Seizō	2217–2221
1943	ミカサ16–ミカサ19	Hitachi	1392–1395
1943	ミカサ110–ミカサ113	Hitachi	1478–1481
1943	ミカサ119–ミカサ128	Nippon Sharyō	1193–1202
1944	ミカサ114–ミカサ118	Kisha Seizō	2222–2226
1944	ミカサ127–ミカサ137, ミカサ320	Hitachi	1729 – 1733, 1872 – 1875, 1871

== Postwar ==
The exact distribution of Sentetsu's Mikashi-class locomotives after the partition of Korea is uncertain, but they were operated by both the Korean National Railroad in the South and by the Korean State Railway in the North.

=== Korean National Railroad 미카3 (Mika3) class ===
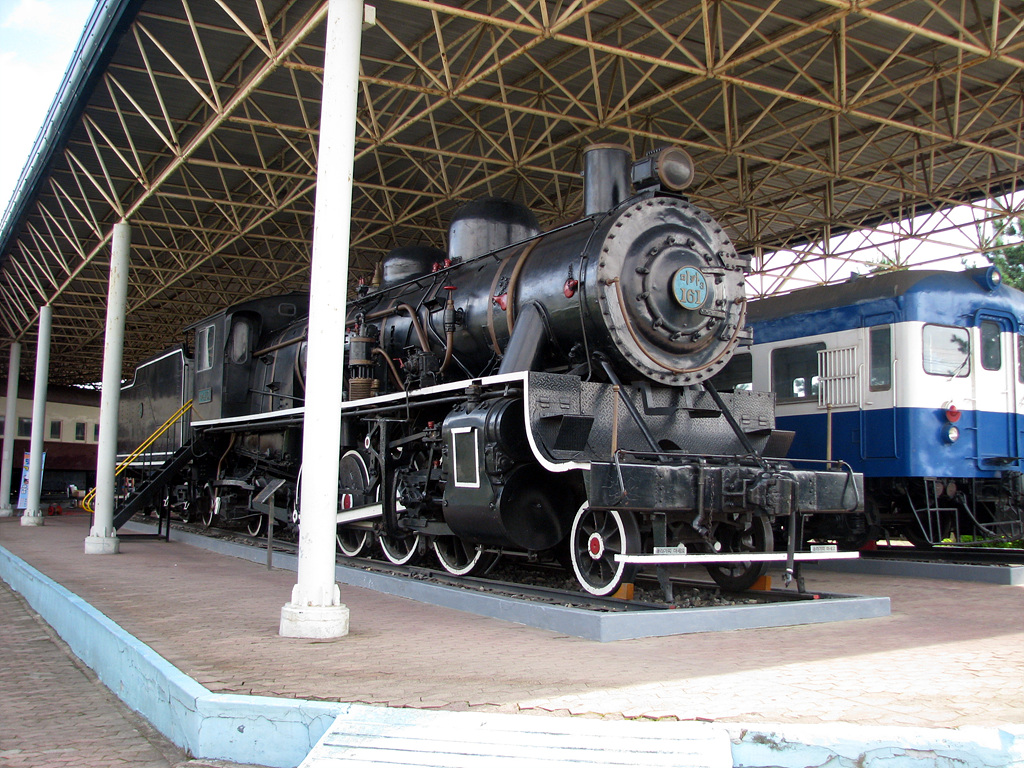
KNR Mika3-161 on display at the Korean Railway Museum.

Though the exact quantity and identities of the former Sentetsu Mikasa class locomotives that went to the Korean National Railroad isn't certain, there were at least 54 that were operated by the KNR. Additionally, a further five, which had been under construction for Sentetsu at the end of the Pacific War, were completed by Hitachi in 1946 and delivered to the KNR as 미카3-298 through 미카3-302 (works numbers 2022–2026); this was followed by eight, 미카3-314 through 미카3-321, built new in 1947. They were operated until at least 1989, by which time they were mostly relegated to shunting duties.

Known Korean National Railroad 미카3
KNR number	Sentetsu number in 1945	Builder	Year built	Works Number	Notes
미카3–8	ミカサ8	Kisha Seizō	1927	964	
미카3–16	ミカサ16	Kawasaki	1928	1252	
미카3–17	ミカサ17	Kawasaki	1928	1253	Scrapped by 1954.
미카3–27	ミカサ27	Gyeongseong	1930	14	During and immediately after the Korean War, carried "Southern Pacific" lettering on the tender.
미카3–31	ミカサ31	Hitachi	1935	617	
미카3–42	ミカサ42	Kisha Seizō	1936	1388	
미카3–43	ミカサ43	Kawasaki	1937	1844	
미카3–50	ミカサ50	Nippon Sharyō	1938	516	
미카3–52	ミカサ52	Kisha Seizō	1937	1507	
미카3–66	ミカサ66	Kisha Seizō	1938	1539	
미카3–71	ミカサ71	Nippon Sharyō	1939	607	Still in service in 1971.
미카3–76	ミカサ76	Kawasaki	1939	2118	
미카3–78	ミカサ78	Kawasaki	1939	2120	
미카3–89	ミカサ89	Kisha Seizō	1938	1659	
미카3–94	ミカサ94	Kisha Seizō	1939	1672	
미카3–96	ミカサ96	Kisha Seizō	1939	1674	
미카3–99	ミカサ99	Kisha Seizō	1939	1677	
미카3–100	ミカサ100	Hitachi	1939	1036	
미카3–111	ミカサ111	Kisha Seizō	1940	1897	
미카3-112	ミカサ112	Kisha Seizø	1940	1898	Decommissioned on June 30, 1979.
미카3–118	ミカサ118	Kisha Seizō	1940	1904	Scrapped by 1953.
미카3–119	ミカサ119	Kisha Seizō	1940	1905	Decommissioned on June 30, 1979
미카3–120	ミカサ120	Kisha Seizō	1940	1936	Decommissioned on April 29, 1983
미카3-124	ミカサ124	Kisha Seizō	1940	1940	
미카3-129	ミカサ129	Kisha Seizō	1940	1945	Decommissioned on April 29, 1983. Preserved at Daejeon National Cemetery.
미카3-131	ミカサ131	Hitachi	1942	1172	Decommissioned on April 29, 1983.
미카3-142	ミカサ142	Hitachi	1940	1183	
미카3-144	ミカサ144	Hitachi	1940	1185	Still in service in 1971.
미카3-146	ミカサ146	Hitachi	1940	1187	Still in service in 1965.
미카3-148	ミカサ148	Nippon Sharyō	1940	817	Decommissioned on December 31, 1978.
미카3–150	ミカサ150	Nippon Sharyō	1940	819	
미카3-160	ミカサ160	Nippon Sharyō	1940	829	Decommissioned on December 31, 1978
미카3-161	ミカサ161	Nippon Sharyō	1940	830	Decommissioned on April 29, 1983. Preserved at the Korean Railway Museum.
미카3-162	ミカサ162	Nippon Sharyō	1940	831	Decommissioned on June 30, 1979
미카3-169	ミカサ169	Nippon Sharyō	1940	838	
미카3-177	ミカサ177	Gyeongseong	1940	68	Decommissioned on April 29, 1983
미카3-180	ミカサ180	Kisha Seizō	1940	1960	
미카3-181	ミカサ181	Kisha Seizō	1940	1961	
미카3-185	ミカサ185	Kisha Seizō	1940	1965	Decommissioned on June 30, 1979
미카3-189	ミカサ189	Kisha Seizō	1940	1969	
미카3-198	ミカサ198	Kisha Seizō	1941	2050	Decommissioned on December 31, 1978.
미카3-199	ミカサ199	Kisha Seizō	1941	2051	
미카3-208	ミカサ208	Kisha Seizō	1941	2161	
미카3-209	ミカサ209	Kisha Seizō	1942	2209	
미카3-210	ミカサ210	Kisha Seizō	1942	2210	Decommissioned on December 31, 1978
미카3-212	ミカサ212	Kisha Seizō	1942	2212	Wrecked in 1953 in a collision with a tank.
미카3-215	ミカサ215	Kisha Seizō	1942	2215	Decommissioned on December 31, 1978
미카3-216	ミカサ216	Kisha Seizō	1942	2216	Decommissioned on December 31, 1978
미카3-219	ミカサ219	Kisha Seizō	1943	2268	
미카3-220	ミカサ220	Kisha Seizō	1943	2269	Decommissioned on June 30, 1979
미카3-226	ミカサ226	Nippon Sharyō	1942	1032	Decommissioned on December 31, 1978
미카3-228	ミカサ228	Nippon Sharyō	1942	1034	
미카3-239	ミカサ239	Nippon Sharyō	1943	1176	
미카3-242	ミカサ242	Nippon Sharyō	1943	1179	
미카3-244	ミカサ244	Nippon Sharyō	1943	1181	Decommissioned on December 31, 1978. Preserved at Imjingak.
미카3-245	ミカサ245	Nippon Sharyō	1943	1261	Decommissioned on December 31, 1978
미카3-246	ミカサ246	Nippon Sharyō	1942	1262	Decommissioned on June 30, 1979
미카3-247	ミカサ247	Nippon Sharyō	1944	1263	Decommissioned on June 30, 1979
미카3-253	ミカサ253	Hitachi	1942	1626	Still in service in 1971.
미카3-255	ミカサ255	Hitachi	1942	1704	Still in service in 1971.
미카3-256	ミカサ256	Hitachi	1942	1705	Decommissioned on December 31, 1978
미카3-257	ミカサ257	Hitachi	1942	1706	
미카3-261	ミカサ261	Hitachi	1942	1710	Decommissioned on December 31, 1978
미카3-264	ミカサ264	Hitachi	1942	1713	Decommissioned on December 31, 1978
미카3-270	ミカサ270	Hitachi	1942	2216	
미카3-271	ミカサ271	Hitachi	1942	1720	
미카3-272	ミカサ272	Hitachi	1942	1721	Still in service in 1968.
미카3-273	ミカサ273	Kisha Seizō	1942	1722	Decommissioned on December 31, 1978
미카3-274	ミカサ274	Kisha Seizō	1942	1723	Still in service in 1965.
미카3-276	ミカサ276	Hitachi	1942	1725	Decommissioned on June 30, 1979.
미카3-277	ミカサ277	Hitachi	1942	1726	Decommissioned on June 30, 1979.
미카3-278	ミカサ278	Hitachi	1942	1727	Decommissioned on December 31, 1978
미카3-280	ミカサ280	Hitachi	1944	1848	
미카3-285	ミカサ285	Hitachi	1942	1853	Decommissioned on December 31, 1978.
미카3-288	ミカサ288	Hitachi	1944	1945	Wrecked in an accident with a lorry in 1953.
미카3-290	ミカサ290	Hitachi	1944	1947	Decommissioned on 1980
미카3-293	ミカサ293	Hitachi	1944	1950	Wartime Design Model. Minorly damaged by the massive bombing of Yongsan on July 16, 1950, but restored on an before 1953.
미카3-298	–	Hitachi	1946	2022	Decommissioned on 1980
미카3-299	–	Hitachi	1946	2023	
미카3-300	–	Hitachi	1946	2024	
미카3-301	–	Hitachi	1946	2025	Still in service in 1971.
미카3-302	–	Hitachi	1946	2026	Wartime Design Model for Past. Destroyed and burned during the Korean War, but rebuilt in 1952 at the Mitsubishi Heavy Industries Mihara Vehicle Works with a standard design.
미카3-303	ミカサ303	Nippon Sharyō	1944	1332	Decommissioned on December 31, 1978
미카3-304	ミカサ304	Nippon Sharyō	1944	1333	Preserved at Sammu Park in Jeju City.
미카3-311	ミカサ311	Nippon Sharyō	1944	1340	Decommissioned on December 31, 1978
미카3-312	ミカサ312	Nippon Sharyō	1944	1341	
미카3-314	–	?	1947		
미카3-315	–	?	1947		
미카3-316	–	?	1947		
미카3-317	–	?	1947		
미카3-318	–	?	1947		Still in service in 1965.
미카3-319	–	?	1947		
미카3-320	–	?	1947		
미카3-321	–	?	1947		Still in service in 1975.
미카3-402	-	Kisha Seizō	1937	-	From Samcheok Railway. Decommissioned on June 30, 1979

=== Korean State Railway 미가서 (Migasŏ) class/6300 series ===
The identities and quantity of Sentetsu's Mikasa class locomotives that ended up in North Korea is not known; another eight were taken over from the West Chosen Central Railway. They remained in service for many decades after the Korean War; some may still be in service at the present time. They were initially designated 미가서 (Migasŏ) class, and were later renumbered into the 6300 series; numbers higher than 100 were probably numbered into the 6400 series, as there were less than 24 Mikashi/Miganŏ-class locomotives in the DPRK, so numbers from 6425 on would have been free. How those taken over from the West Chosen Central Railway were numbered is unknown.

Known Korean State Railway 미가서
KSR number	Sentetsu number in 1945	Builder	Year built	Works Number	Notes
미가서18 (6318)	ミカサ18	Kisha Seizō	1928	1016	Active around Kaesŏng in the 1990s.
미가서36 (6336)	ミカサ36	Kisha Seizō	1936	1382	Still in service in 2003.
미가서44 (6344)	ミカサ44	Kawasaki	1937	1845	Active around Wŏnsan in the 1990s.
미가서91 (6391)	ミカサ91	Kisha Seizō	1938	1661	Featured in the 1971 film On the Railway (철길우에서)
미가서168 (6468?)	ミカサ168	Nippon Sharyō	1940	837	Featured in the 1971 film On the Railway (철길우에서)

=== China Railways 解放9 (JF9) class ===
Following the end of the war, the Central China Railway was absorbed into the state-owned Republic of China Railway, and after the establishment of the People's Republic in 1949 and the subsequent establishment of the China Railway in 1950, the Central China Railway Mikasas were given the ㄇㄎ玖 (MK9) designation; in 1959 they were reclassified 解放9 (JF9, "Liberation 9"), numbered 3671 through 3710. Although they were classified ㄇㄎ玖/解放9, they are completely different from the Mantetsu Mikaku (ミカク) class. The last of the JF9s in China were retired in the 1990s. JF9 3673 has been preserved, and is on display at the China Railway Museum in Beijing.

== Preserved examples ==
- In South Korea
  - Mika3-129, at the Daejeon National Cemetery, on loan from the Daejeon Railway Vehicle Maintenance Centre
  - Mika3-161, at the Korail Railroad Museum
  - Mika3-244, at Imjingak
  - Mika3-304, at Sammu Park in Jeju City
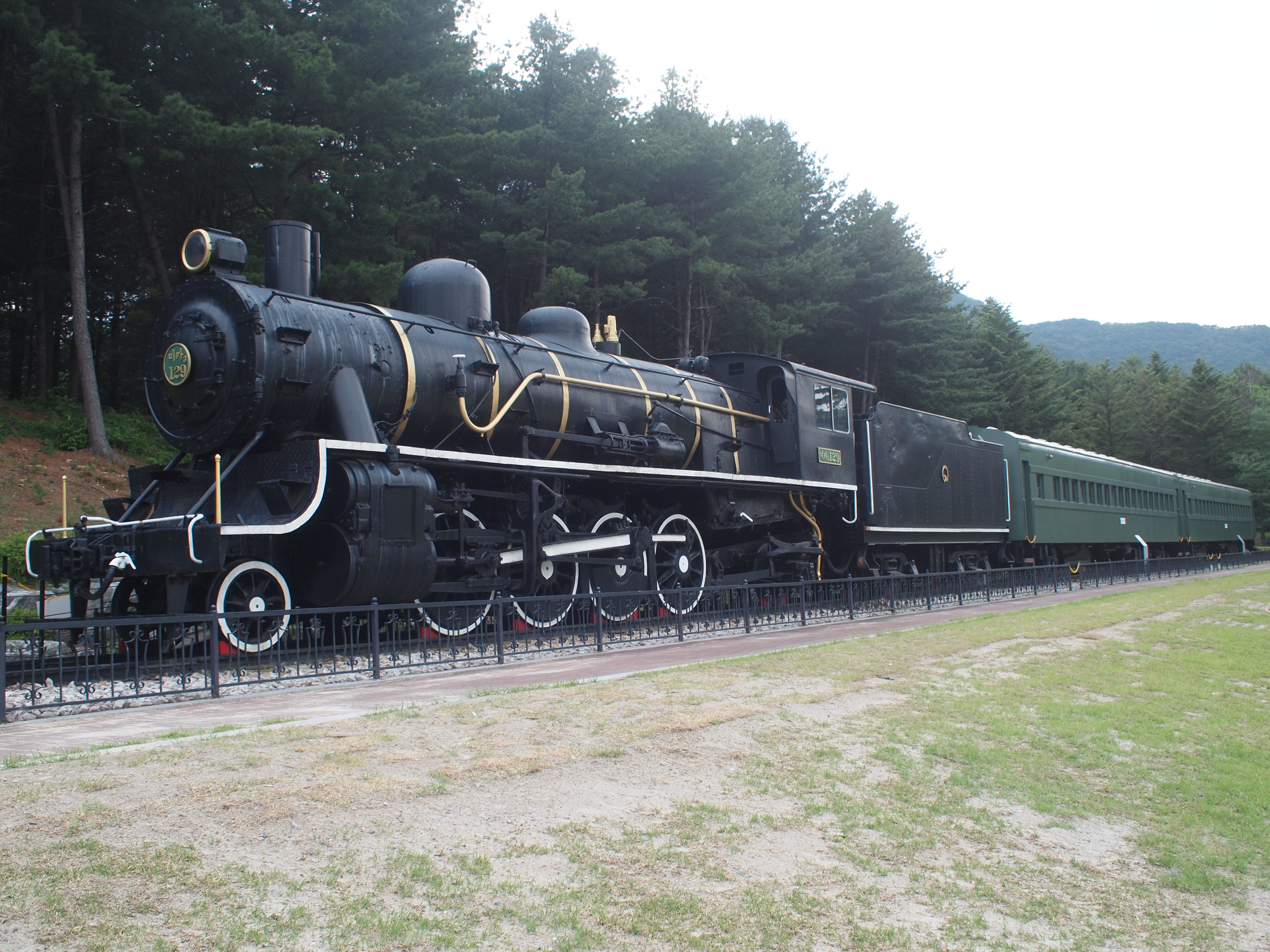
Mika3-129

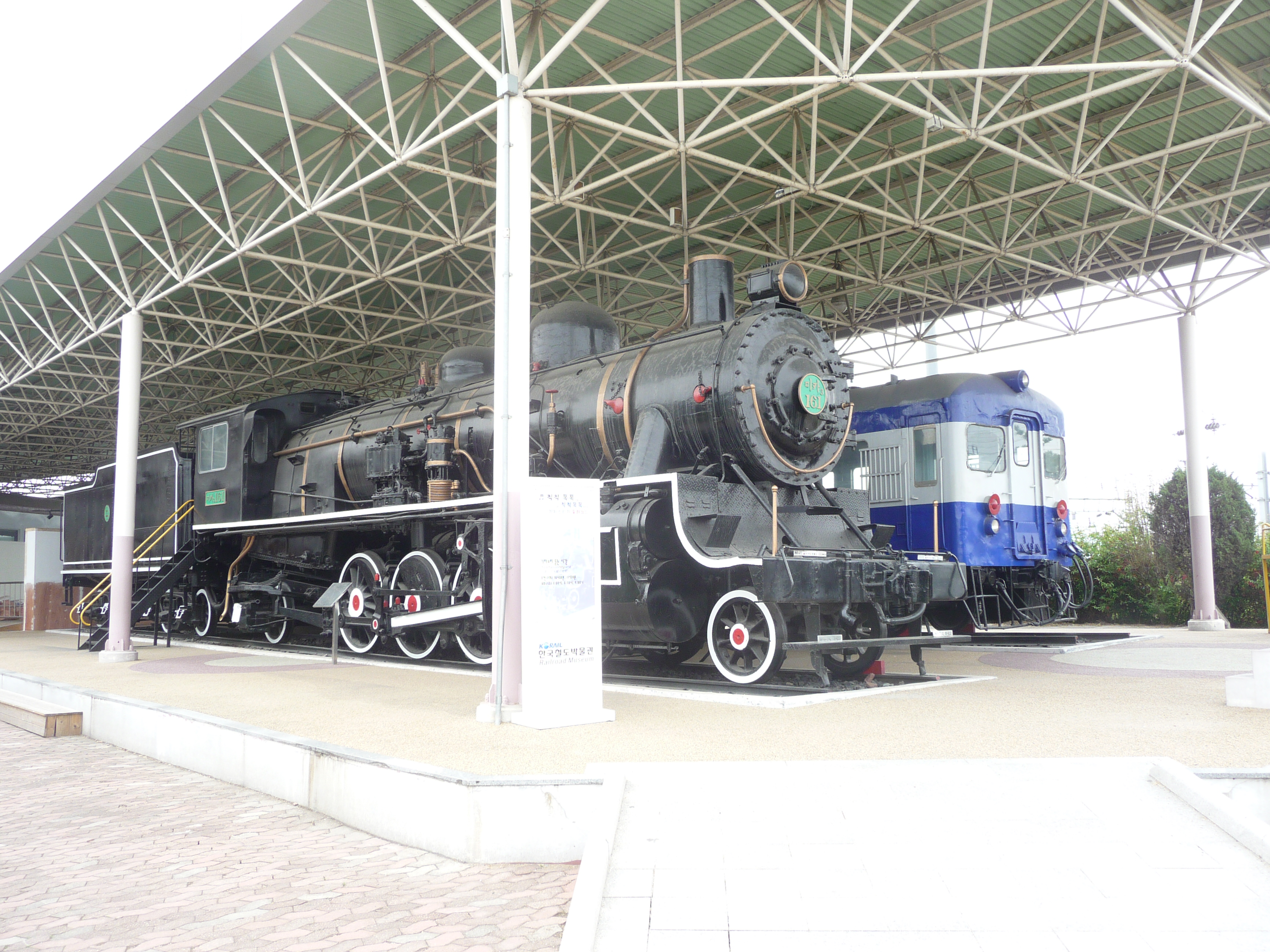
Mika3-161

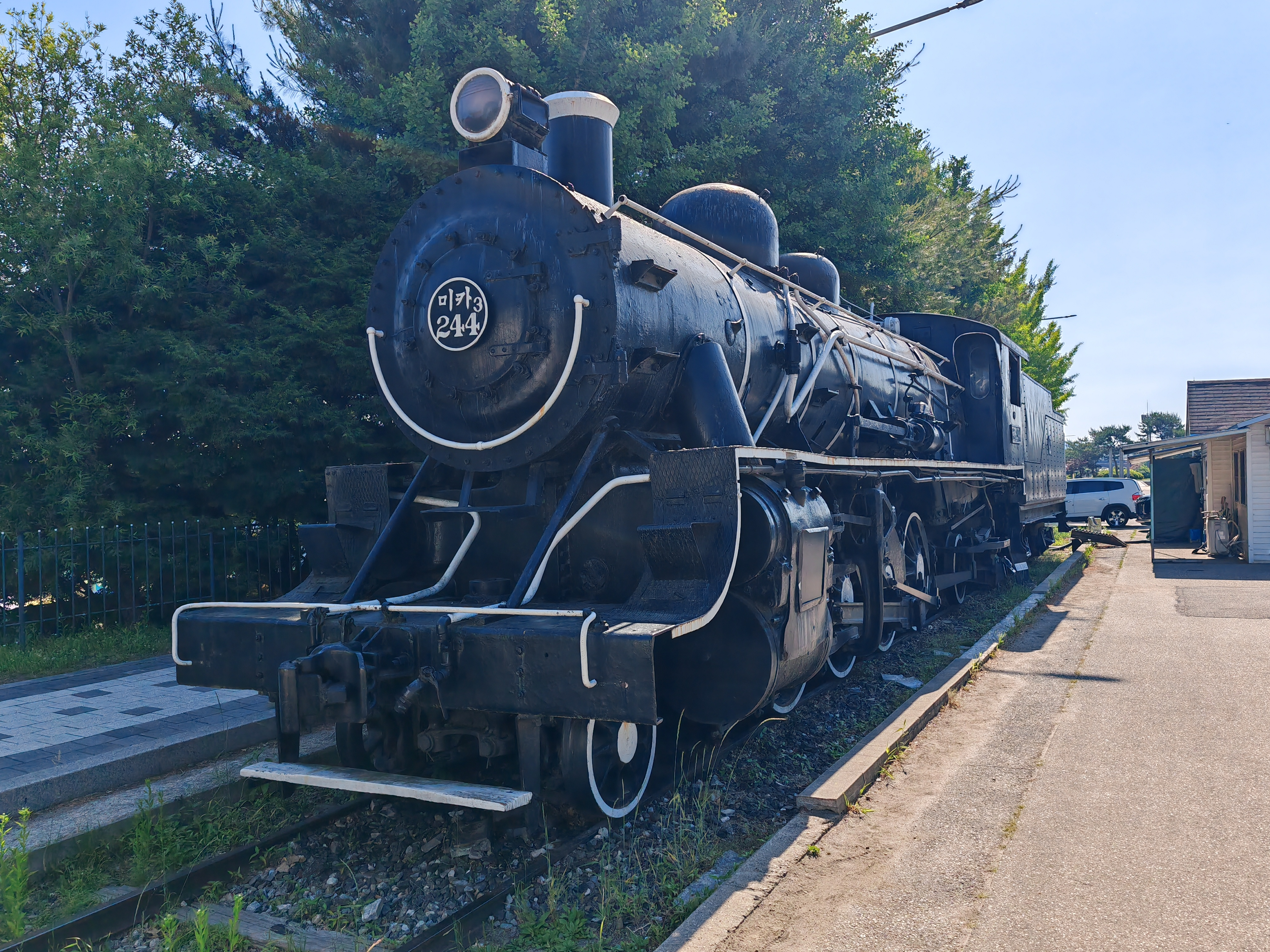
Mika3-244

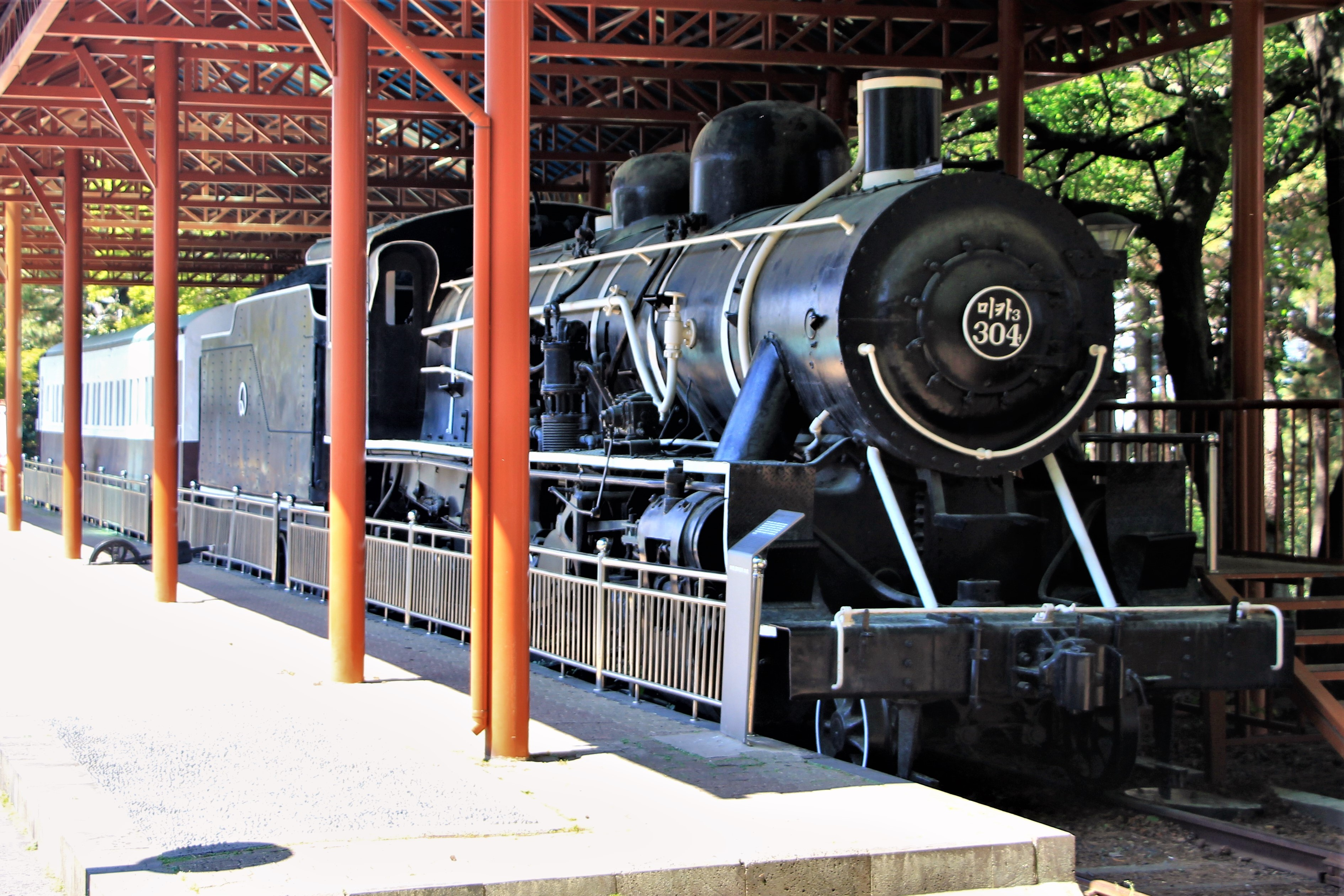
Mika3-304
- In China:
  - JF9-3673, at the China Railway Museum in Beijing.

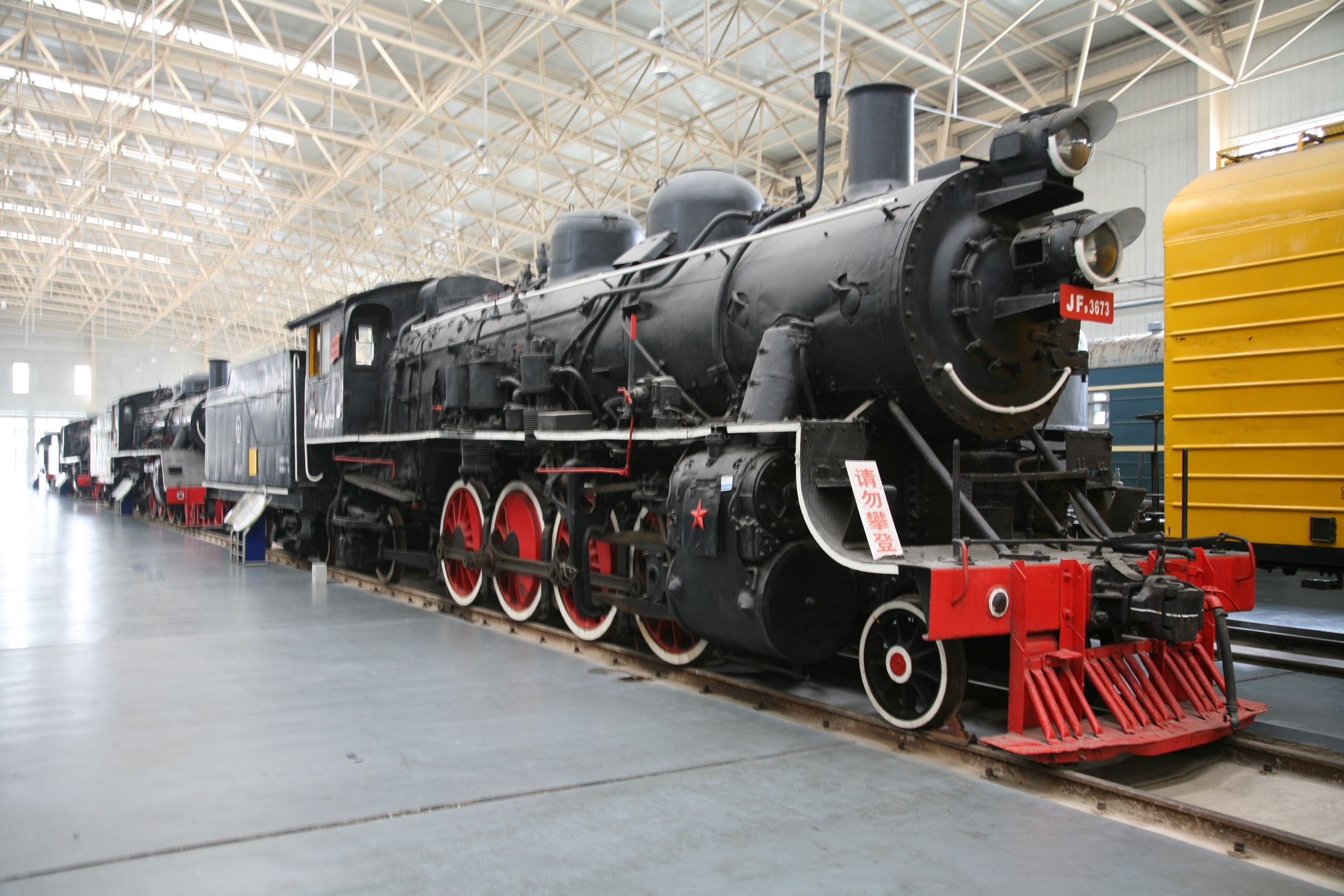
JF9-3673 preserved at China Railway Museum

In addition, the hulks of two Mikasa class locomotives which were destroyed during the Korean war are located within the DMZ and are deteriorating from exposure to the elements.

- In North Korea:
  - Migasŏ-6336, at Hamhung depot.

== Gallery ==
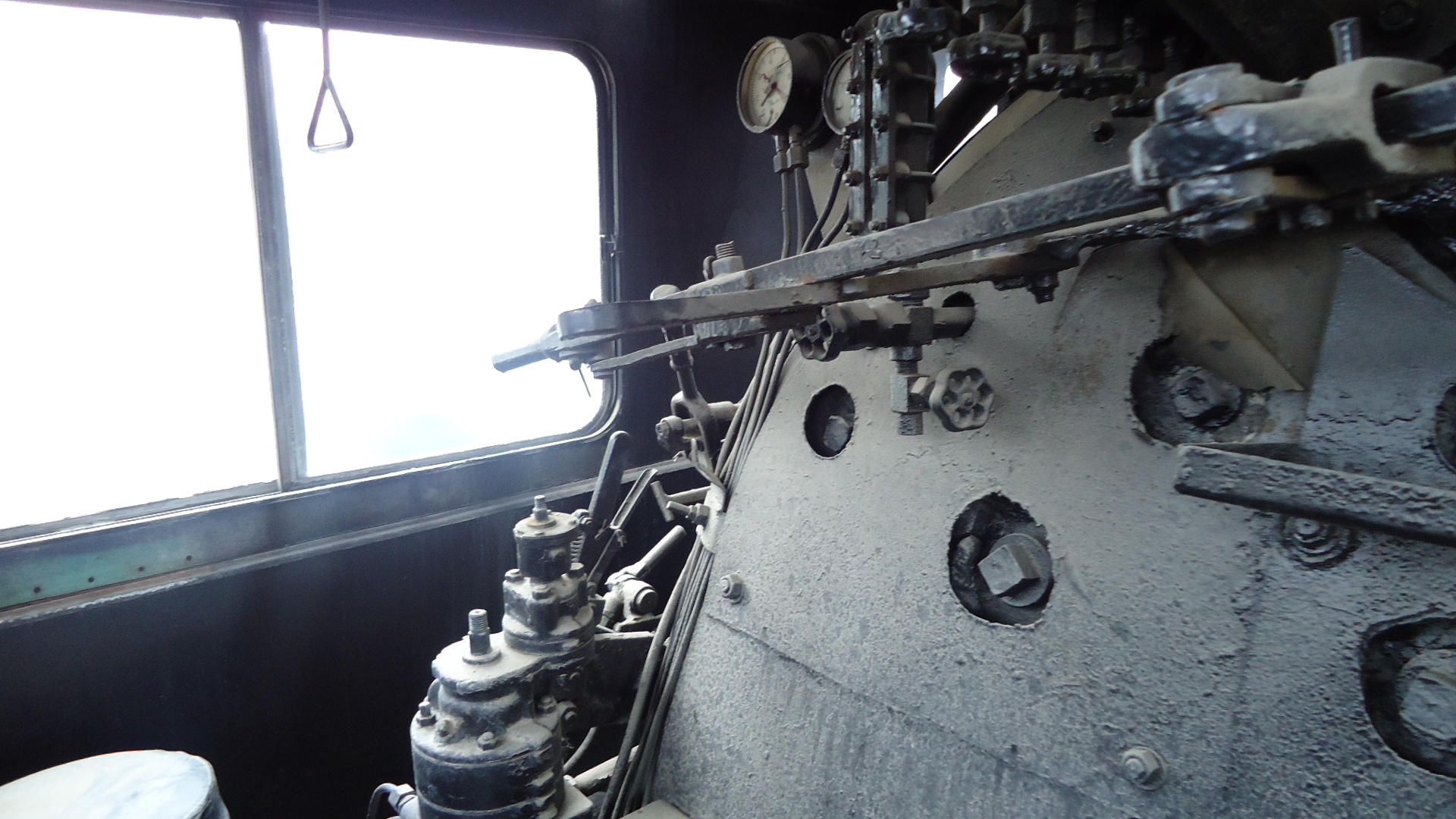
Cab of Mika3-129

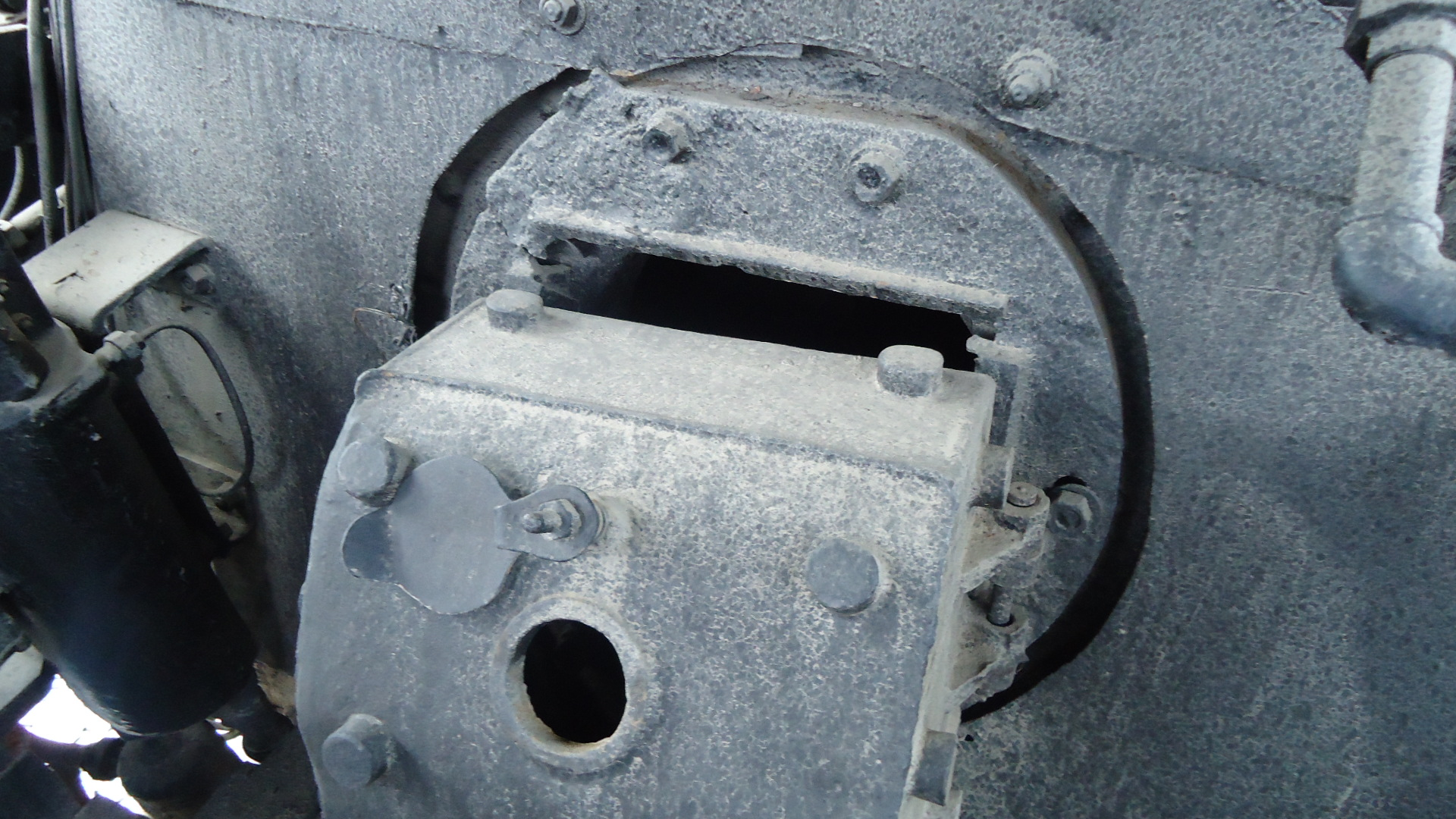
Firebox door of Mika3-129
