= China Railways JF8 =

China Railways JF8 (解放8) Huainan Railway Class 300
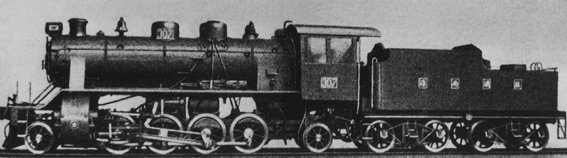
- Builder's photo of Huainan Railway No. 307
Type and origin
- Power type: Steam
- Builder: Škoda Works
- Build date: 1935
- Total produced: >7
Specifications
- Configuration
  - Whyte: 2-8-2
- Gauge: 1,435 mm (4 ft 8 1/2 in)
- Driver dia.: 1,321 mm (4 ft 4.0 in)
- Length: 17,925 mm (58 ft 9.7 in)
- Total weight: 103.89 t (102.25 long tons)
- Fuel type: Coal
- Cylinders: Two, outside
Career
- Operators: Huainan Railway, Central China Railway, China Railway
- Class: HR: 300 series (1935−1939); CR: ㄇㄎ8 (1951−1959); CR: 解放8 (1959–end)
- Number in class: >7
- Numbers: HR: 301−307... CR: 3651−3670
- Disposition: All scrapped

The China Railways JF8 (解放8, Jiěfàng, "liberation") class steam locomotive was a class of 2-8-2 "Mikado" type steam locomotives operated by the China Railway, originally built by the Škoda Works in Czechoslovakia in 1935 for the Huainan Railway.

== History ==
At least seven of these locomotives were originally built for the Huainan Railway, and after the establishment of the Japanese puppet government of the Reformed Government of the Republic of China, they were operated by the Central China Railway, which had been created in 1939 to manage all railway operations in the territory of the collaborationist government by nationalising all privately owned railways in the territory.

== Postwar ==
After the end of the Pacific War, these locomotives were passed on to the Republic of China Railway. After the establishment of the People's Republic of China, China Railways designated them ㄇㄎ8 (MK8) class in 1951. Numbered in the 3651−3670 range, they were reclassified 解放8 (JF8) class in 1959.

JF8 3651, 3661, 3662, and 3669 were noted to be in dump around Hainan Island in May 1985. The last engines of the class were retired in 1990.
