= Ningbo West railway station =

Railway station in Ningbo, Zhejiang

Ningbo West 宁波西

General information
- Location: Haishu District, Ningbo, Zhejiang; China
- Line(s): Nantong–Ningbo high-speed railway

Ningbo West railway station (Chinese: 宁波西站) is a railway station in Haishu District, Ningbo, Zhejiang, China.

It is an intermediate stop on the Nantong–Ningbo high-speed railway.

== Metro station ==
The station will is a stop on Ningbo Rail Transit lines 2, 6, 9, and 12.
