= China Railways SL12 =

4-6-2 steam locomotive

China Railways SL12 (胜利12) Chosen Government Railway Pashishi class (パシシ) Korean National Railroad Pasi4 class (파시4) Korean State Railway Pasinŏ class (바시너) Central China Railway Pashishi class (パシシ)
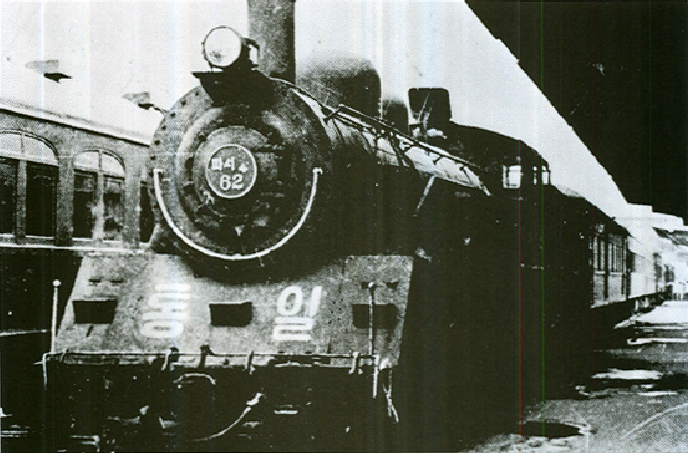
- 파시4-62, named "Tong-il" ("Unity"), of the Korean National Railroad in 1955
Type and origin
- Power type: Steam
- Builder: Kawasaki, Nippon Sharyō
- Build date: 1927–1940 Kawasaki (64); 1940 Nippon Sharyō (8); 1942–1943 Kawasaki (10)
- Total produced: 82
Specifications
- Configuration
  - Whyte: 4-6-2
- Gauge: 1,435 mm (4 ft 8 1/2 in)
- Driver dia.: 1,750 mm (69 in)
- Length: 22,054 mm (72 ft 4.3 in)
- Width: 3,054 mm (10 ft 0.2 in)
- Height: 4,505 mm (14 ft 9.4 in)
- Loco weight: 92.40 t (90.94 long tons)
- Tender weight: 67.40 t (66.34 long tons)
- Fuel capacity: 12.0 t (11.8 long tons)
- Water cap.: 28,000 L (7,400 US gal)
- Firebox
  - Grate area: 4.75 m^{2} (51.1 sq ft)
- Boiler
  - Small tubes: 120 x 51 mm (2.0 in)
  - Large tubes: 28 x 137 mm (5.4 in)
- Boiler pressure: 13.0 kgf/cm^{2} (185 psi)
- Heating surface
  - Firebox: 21.10 m^{2} (227.1 sq ft)
  - Tubes: 155.00 m^{2} (1,668.4 sq ft)
  - Total surface: 176.10 m^{2} (1,895.5 sq ft)
- Superheater
  - Heating area: 61.50 m^{2} (662.0 sq ft)
- Cylinders: Two, outside
- Cylinder size: 580 mm × 660 mm (23 in × 26 in)
- Valve gear: Walschaerts
Performance figures
- Maximum speed: 95 km/h (59 mph)
- Tractive effort: 140.0 kN (31,500 lb_{f})
Career
- Operators: Chosen Government Railway; Korean National Railroad; Korean State Railway; Central China Railway; China Railway
- Class: Sentetsu: パシシ; KNR: 바시4; KSR: 바시너; CCR: パシシ; CR: ㄆㄒ12 (1951–1959), 胜利12 (SL12) (1959–)
- Number in class: Sentetsu: 72; CCR, CR: 10
- Numbers: Sentetsu: パシシ1 – パシシ72; CCR: パシシ11 – パシシ19, パシシ110; CR: SL12-881 – SL12-890
- Delivered: 1927–1943

The China Railways SL12 (胜利12, Shènglì, "victory") class steam locomotive was a class of 4-6-2 steam locomotives for freight trains operated by the China Railway. The "Pashi" name came from the American naming system for steam locomotives, under which locomotives with 4-6-2 wheel arrangement were called "Pacific".

In all, Sentetsu owned 144 locomotives of all Pashi classes, of which 141 survived the war; of these, 73 went to the Korean National Railroad in South Korea and 68 to the Korean State Railway in North Korea.

== Description ==
Based on the experiences gained through the rebuilding of the Pureshi-class engines, the Pashishi class was, together with the Mikasa and Tehoro classes developed simultaneously, the first steam locomotive designed in-house by Sentetsu. Designed specifically for Korean operational conditions and needs, it proved to be very easy to build, operate and maintain, as care was taken during the design process to maximise the interchangeability of parts between the three classes.

The Pashishi class were superheated two-cylinder locomotives intended for use on high-value passenger trains, of which a total of 82 were built for Sentetsu and for the Central China Railway by Kawasaki and Nippon Sharyō between 1927 and 1943. From their inception, the Mikasa, Pashishi and Tehoro classes were designed to use the lignite abundant in Korea, which is less efficient than the anthracite the American-built locomotives needed; as such, they all had large heating areas. The Pashishi class featured a conical boiler and a combustion chamber firebox to achieve sufficient combustion of the coal, which in turn significantly improved evaporation and maintenance of steam. The experience with these three classes induced the Japanese Government Railways to install combustion chamber fireboxes on the 9700 and D52 classes built for the JGR from 1943.

A state-of-the-art locomotive in its time, structurally it is generally an American design in its features, with the first dome being a sandbox, and the second being for steam. The firebox is located above the trailing axle. After the first four were completed, the design was modified, resulting in a slightly different appearance of the smokestack and the steam dome, and smoke deflectors were added. The tender is a four-axle type, running on two four-wheel bogies of American Bettendorf design. Four units, numbers パシシ981–パシシ984, were built in 1936 with partial streamlining, featuring a shroud on top of the boiler from the chimney to the cab, giving an appearance similar to the JNR's D51 22–23 locomotives. Further, they had a fully enclosed cab, a headlamp mounted at the centre of the smokebox door, and the idler wheels and tender wheels had roller bearings.

=== Chosen Government Railway パシシ (Pashishi) class ===
Between 1927 and 1940, Sentetsu took delivery of 72 Pashishi-class locomotives, with the first 64 built by Kawasaki, followed by a further 8 from Nippon Sharyō in 1940. They first entered service pulling the "Akatsuki" limited express, where its performance was found to be excellent, and they were quickly put to use on the highest-value passenger trains in Korea, especially on the Gyeongbu and Gyeongui Lines, such as the "Akatsuki" limited express mentioned previously, along with other express trains, and trains connecting to express trains of the South Manchuria Railway at Sinuiju/Andong.

By April 1938 twenty had been completed, numbered パシ971–パシ990. In Sentetsu's 1938 general renumbering, these became パシシ1–パシシ20, and those units built after the renumbering continued the new sequence.

Timeline of Pashishi production for Sentetsu
	Running Number					
Year	Original	Post-1938	Builder	Works Number	Total	Notes
1927	971–974	パシシ1–パシシ4	Kawasaki	1184–1187	4	
1934	975–980	パシシ5–パシシ10	Kawasaki	1508–1530	6	
1936	981–984	パシシ11–パシシ14	Kawasaki	1709, 1710, 1736, 1737	4	Semi-streamlined
1937	985–990	パシシ15–パシシ20	Kawasaki	1779–1782, 1836, 1837	6	
1939		パシシ21–パシシ46	Kawasaki	2047–2051, 2057–2061, 2100–2107, 2183–2190	26	
1940		パシシ47–パシシ64	Kawasaki	2221–2224, 2241–2244, 2263–2266, 2291–2293, 2300–2302	18	
1940		パシシ65–パシシ72	Nippon Sharyō	847–854	8	
Total						72

=== Central China Railway パシシ (Pashishi) class ===
The Central China Railway suffered from a severe motive power shortage from its establishment in 1939. After receiving regauged JGR locomotives second-hand as an emergency measure, new locomotives were delivered in the early 1940s. Amongst these were ten Sentetsu-designed Pashishi-class locomotives built for the Central China Railway by Kawasaki in 1942 and 1943.

Timeline of Pashishi production for the Central China Railway
Year	Running Number	Builder	Works Number	Total
1942	パシシ11–パシシ15	Kawasaki	2666–2670	5
1943	パシシ16–パシシ19, パシシ110	Kawasaki	2797–2801	5
Total				10

== Postwar ==
After the defeat of Japan and the Liberation of Korea and of China, these locomotives were taken over by the new national railway companies of North Korea, South Korea and China. The exact division of the Korean locomotives is uncertain, but roughly equal numbers of the 72 locomotives are believed to have gone to the Korean National Railroad in the South and the Korean State Railway in the North.

=== Korean National Railroad 파시4 (Pasi4) class ===
The exact identities of the locomotives that went to the Korean National Railroad is uncertain, but they were designated 파시4 (Pasi4) class, and were used on passenger trains until the 1960s.

Known KNR 파시4-class locomotives
KNR number	Final Sentetsu number	Original number	Builder	Year	Works Number	Notes
파시4-4	パシシ4	パシ974	Kawasaki	1927	1187	Derelict by 1954.
파시4-9	パシシ9	パシ979	Kawasaki	1934	1529	Streamlined tender.
파시4-14	パシシ14	パシ984	Kawasaki	1936	1737	Streamlining removed by 1951; wrecked in 1951, repaired and returned to service.
파시4-20	パシシ20	パシ990	Kawasaki	1937	1837	
파시4-39	パシシ39	-	Kawasaki	1939	2183	
파시4-53	パシシ53	-	Kawasaki	1940	2243	
파시4-62	パシシ62	-	Kawasaki	1940	2300	Named 통일 (Tong-il), "Unity".

=== Korean State Railway 바시너 (Pasinŏ) class ===
The locomotives taken over by the Korean State Railway were initially designated 바시너 (Pasinŏ) class. The total number, their service lives and subsequent fates are unknown, but they were probably retired by the end of the 1960s.

=== China Railways 胜利12 (SL12) class ===
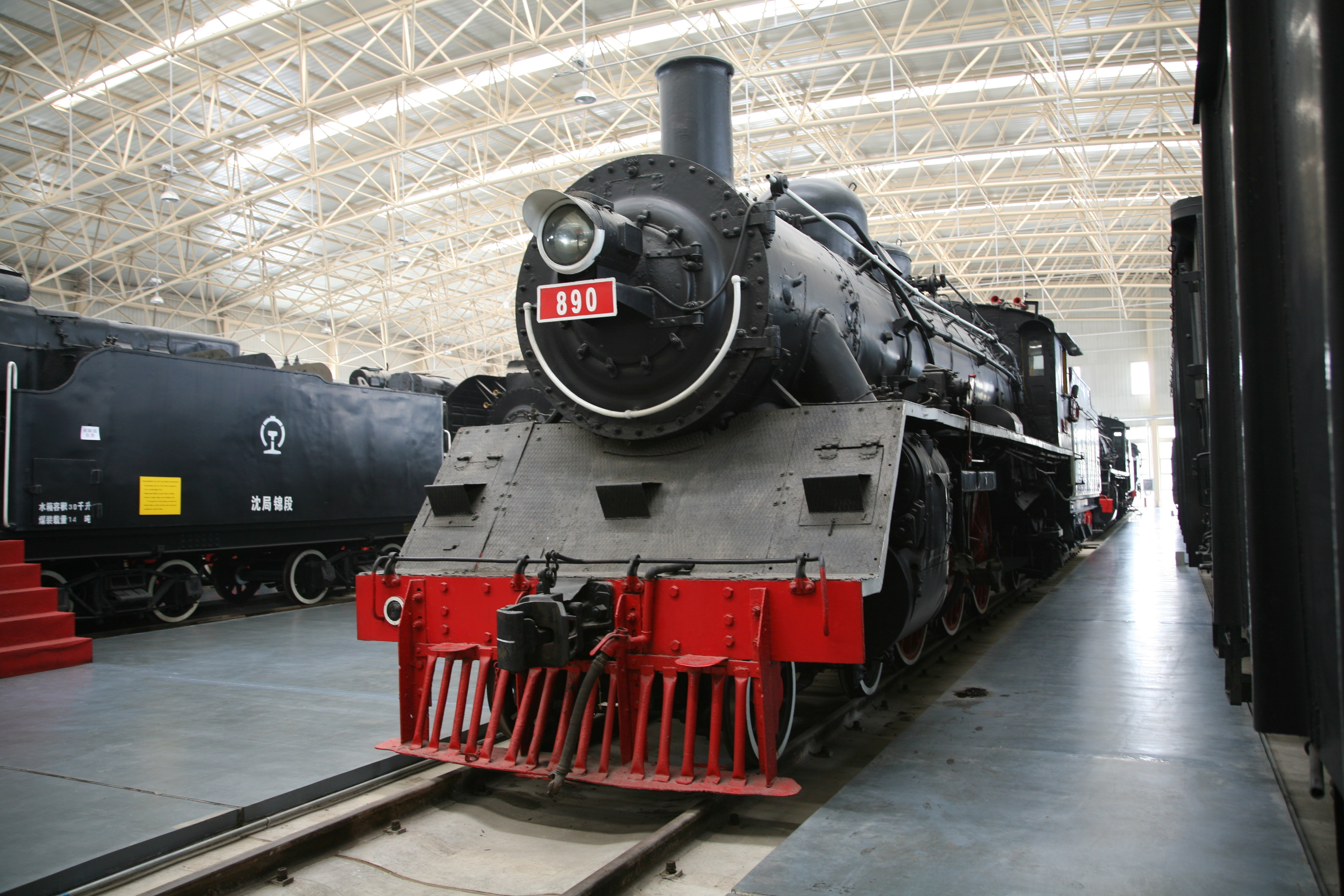
SL12-890 at China Railway Museum

After the end of the Pacific War, the Pashishi-class locomotives of the Central China Railway were taken over by the Republic of China Railway, and following the subsequent establishment of the People's Republic of China, by the China Railway, which classified them ㄆㄒ12 (PX12) in 1951. In 1959 they were reclassified 胜利12 (SL12) class (胜利 = Shènglì, "victory"), and they remained in service into the 1980s. SL12 881, 883−888, and 891 were last seen working around Hangzhou in 1983−1984.

SL12 890 is preserved at the China Railway Museum in Beijing. Their renumbering seems to have not been sequential, as 890 is a 1942-built unit.
