= Sentetsu Tehoro-class locomotive =

4-6-0 steam locomotive

Chosen Government Railway Tehoro class (テホロ) Korean National Railroad Teou6 class (터우6) Korean State Railway Tŏuyu class (더우유)
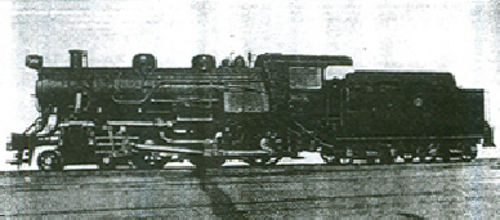
- A Tehoro-class locomotive as built.
Type and origin
- Power type: Steam
- Builder: Gyeongseong Works, Kawasaki, Hitachi Kasato, Mitsubishi
- Build date: 1927–1942
- Total produced: 95
Specifications
- Configuration
  - Whyte: 4-6-0
- Gauge: 1,435 mm (4 ft 8 1/2 in)
- Driver dia.: 1,680 mm (66 in)
- Length: 18,424 mm (60 ft 5.4 in)
- Width: 3,050 mm (10 ft 0 in)
- Height: 4,232 mm (13 ft 10.6 in)
- Loco weight: 75.10 t (73.91 long tons) to 77.20 t (75.98 long tons)
- Tender weight: 48.50 t (47.73 long tons) to 54.00 t (53.15 long tons)
- Fuel capacity: 7.6 t (7.5 long tons) to 9.5 t (9.3 long tons)
- Water cap.: 17,500 L (4,600 US gal) to 20,000 L (5,300 US gal)
- Firebox
  - Grate area: 4.36 m^{2} (46.9 sq ft)
- Boiler
  - Small tubes: 150 x 51 mm (2.0 in)
  - Large tubes: 24 x 137 mm (5.4 in)
- Boiler pressure: 12.6 kgf/cm^{2} (179 psi)
- Heating surface
  - Firebox: 12.00 m^{2} (129.2 sq ft)
  - Tubes: 157.20 m^{2} (1,692.1 sq ft)
  - Total surface: 170.80 m^{2} (1,838.5 sq ft)
- Superheater
  - Heating area: 46.30 m^{2} (498.4 sq ft)
- Cylinders: 1
- Cylinder size: 530 mm × 660 mm (21 in × 26 in)
- Valve gear: Walschaerts
Performance figures
- Maximum speed: 95 km/h (59 mph)
- Tractive effort: 120.0 kN (27,000 lb_{f})
Career
- Operators: Chosen Government Railway; Korean National Railroad; Korean State Railway
- Class: Sentetsu: テホロ; KNR: 터우6; KSR: 더우유
- Number in class: 95
- Numbers: Sentetsu: テホロ1–テホロ95
- Delivered: 1927–1942

The Tehoro-class (テホロ) locomotives were a class of steam tender locomotives of the Chosen Government Railway (Sentetsu) with 4-6-0 wheel arrangement. The "Teho" name came from the American naming system for steam locomotives, under which locomotives with 4-6-0 wheel arrangement were called "Ten Wheeler".

After the Liberation of Korea, of the 178 surviving locomotives of all Teho classes - including six previously owned by private railway companies - 106 went to the Korean National Railroad in the South, and 72 to the Korean State Railway in the North.

== Description ==
Having become indispensable on branchline use, it was decided to modernise the Teho type, and in 1925–26 local engineers developed a derivative locomotive. The result was the テホロ (Tehoro) class, the first of which was built in July 1927 and the second in October of the same year, both at Sentetsu's Gyeongseong Works. These featured a single-stage compressor, and improvements included the expansion of the heat transfer area, improved power transfer and brakes, an automated smoke box door, and other improvements. The Tehoro class was designed for use on both passenger and freight trains, and was used primarily on the Gyeongui and Gyeongbu lines. The next thirteen came in 1929, five from Gyeongseong and four each from Mitsubishi and Hitachi's Kasato works; the last of these became the largest producer of Tehoro class locomotives. Another eighteen were delivered in 1937, nine each from Hitachi Kasato and Kawasaki, and in 1938, as part of Sentetsu's general renumbering, the Tehoro class locomotives in service received numbers テホロ1 through テホロ39. Finally, between 1939 and 1941, 56 more were delivered, mostly from Hitachi Kasato.

The Tehoro class was a notable milestone in the history of Korea's railways. As the first type designed and produced entirely by domestic (Korean and Japanese) factories, it gave Japanese and Korean designers extensive experience which was subsequently applied to the development of the Pashishi and Mikasa-class locomotives.

== Postwar ==
=== Korean National Railroad 터우6 (Teou6) class ===
The exact dispersal of the Tehoko-class locomotives after the partition of Korea in 1945 and the division of Sentetsu assets in 1947 is uncertain, but at least five went to the South, where the Korean National Railroad designated them 터우6 (Teou6) class and used them until April 1955, when they were replaced by diesel locomotives.

Known KNR 터우6-class locomotives
Number	Last Sentetsu number	Builder	Year	Notes
터우6-23	テホロ23	Hitachi Kasato	1937	
터우6-25	テホロ25	Hitachi Kasato	1937	Derelict by 1954.
터우6-32	テホロ32	Kawasaki	1937	
터우6-82	テホロ83	Hitachi Kasato	1942	
터우6-93	テホロ93	Hitachi Kasato	1942	

=== Korean State Railway 더우유 (Tŏuyu) class ===
Most of the class went to the North after the partition, where they were designated 더우유 (Tŏuyu) class by the Korean State Railway, but little is known of their service lives and subsequent fates.

== Construction ==
Year	Builder	Total	Numbers (1927–1938)	Numbers (1938–1945)
1927 July	Gyeongseong	1	751	テホロ1
1927 Oct.	Gyeongseong	1	752	テホロ2
1929 Mar.-Dec.	Gyeongseong	5	759–763	テホロ9–テホロ13
1929	Hitachi Kasato; Mitsubishi	4; 4	764–771	テホロ14–テホロ21
1937	Hitachi Kasato; Kawasaki	9; 9	772–789	テホロ22–テホロ39
1939	Hitachi Kasato	15	-	テホロ40–テホロ54
1940	Hitachi Kasato	10	-	テホロ55–テホロ64
1941	Hitachi Kasato; Kawasaki	14; 3	-	テホロ65–テホロ81
1942	Hitachi Kasato	14	-	テホロ82–テホロ95
Total		95		

Tehoro production totals by manufacturer:
Builder	Years	Total
Gyeongseong	1927, 1929	7
Kawasaki	1927, 1937, 1941	18
Hitachi Kasato	1929, 1937, 1939–42	66
Mitsubishi	1929	4
Total		95
