= Suzhou–Jiaxing railway =

Railway line in China

Overview
- Status: Demolished
- Locale: China
- Termini: Suzhou; Jiaxing

Service
- Type: Single-track railway
- System: China Railway

History
- Opened: 1936
- Closed: 1944

Technical
- Line length: 74.44 km (46.25 mi)
- Track gauge: 1,435 mm (4 ft 8 1/2 in)
- Operating speed: 35 km/h (22 mph)

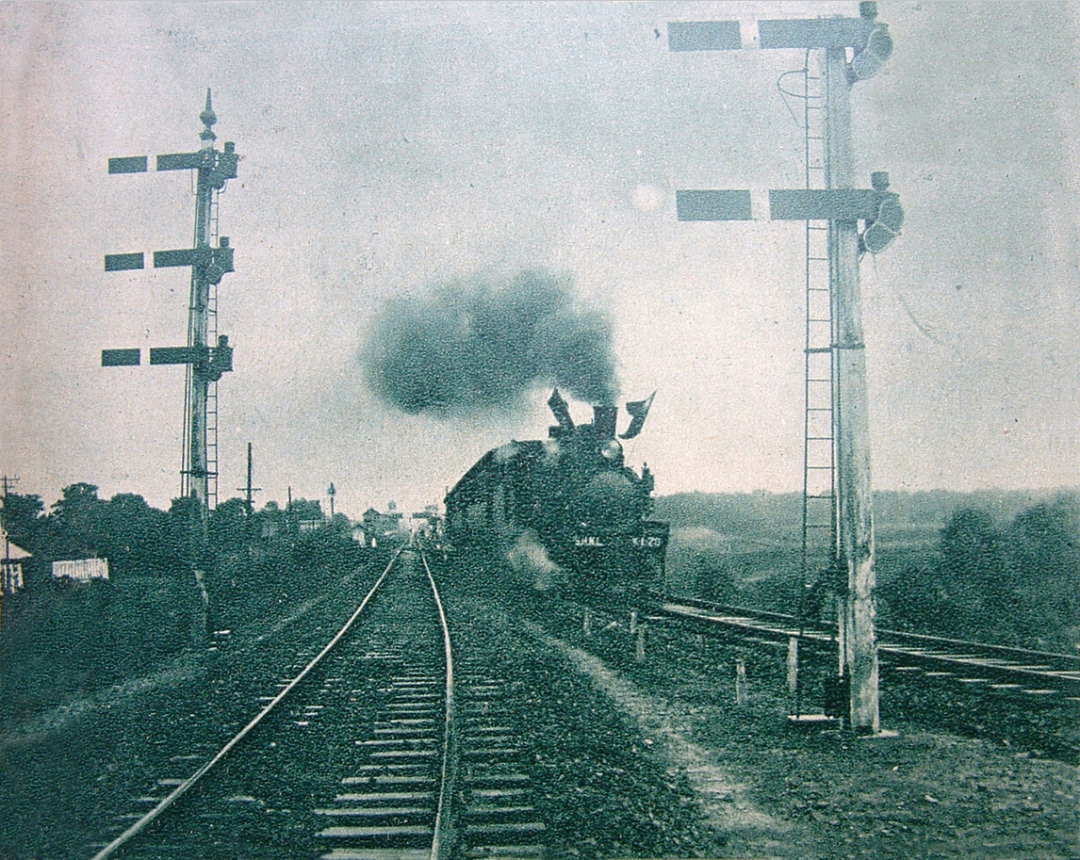
Suzhou–Jiaxing railway in 1936

Suzhou–Jiaxing railway (simplified Chinese: 苏嘉铁路; traditional Chinese: 蘇嘉鐵路; pinyin: Sūjiā tiělù) is a former railway line in China between Suzhou and Jiaxing. The line has a total length of 74.44 kilometres.

== History ==
Due to the failure in January 28 Incident, the government of Republic of China had to accept the demilitarization of Shanghai and needed a new railway to the west of it.

The construction of this railway began on February 22, 1935, and finished on July 15 of the same year.

In 1944, Japanese invaders demolished the railway to get resources.

== See also ==
- Nantong–Ningbo high-speed railway, a proposed new railway which will connect Suzhou and Jiaxing
