= Tongzhou, Nantong =

Tongzhou 通州区 Tungchow
- District
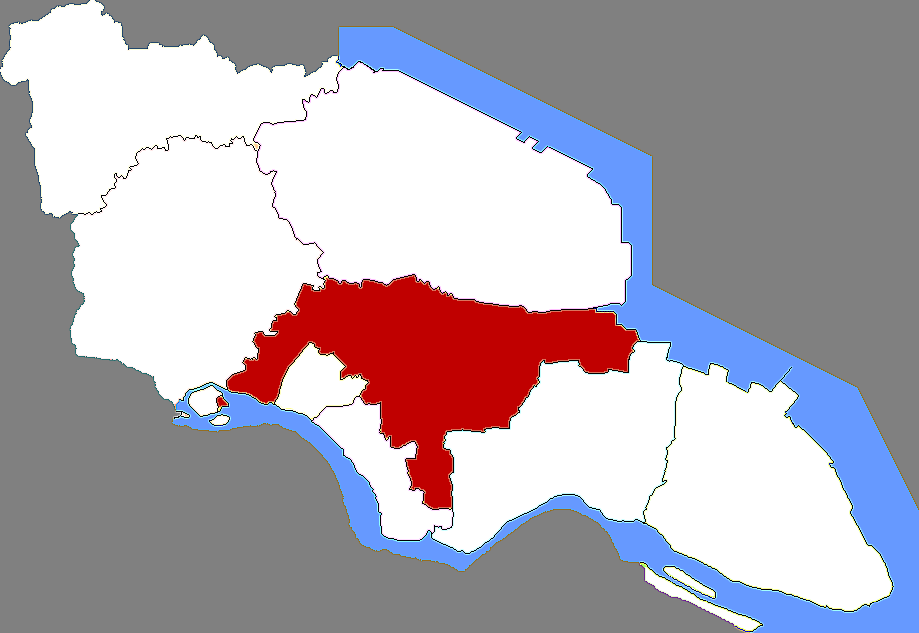
- Tongzhou in Nantong

- Nantong in Jiangsu
- Coordinates: 32°03′51″N 121°04′30″E
- Country: People's Republic of China
- Province: Jiangsu
- Prefecture-level city: Nantong

Area
  - Total: 906 km^{2} (350 sq mi)

Population (2019)
  - Total: 1,675,000
  - Density: 1,850/km^{2} (4,790/sq mi)
- Time zone: UTC+8 (China Standard)
- Postal code: 101149, 101100

Tongzhou District (simplified Chinese: 通州区; traditional Chinese: 通州區; pinyin: Tōngzhōu Qū), formerly known as Tongzhou City (1993–2009) or Nantong County (1912–1993), is one of three urban districts of Nantong, Jiangsu province, China. It was a county-level city under the administration of Nantong until July 2009, when it became a district of Nantong. As of 2010, Tongzhou had a population of 1,246,400.

== History ==
The district takes its name from its former position as the capital of Tongzhou, a prefecture of imperial China. Under the southern Song dynasty, the city controlled not just its adjacent lands but also Xisha and Dongsha, the Yangtze River shoals that eventually developed into Chongming Island.

Shigang Town is located beside the Yangtze where residents made a living mainly by salt making and fishing in ancient times. In 860, Yuhuangdian (玉皇殿) was built and, six year later, the palace of Emperor Taizong of the Tang was rebuilt as the Guangyuan Temple. From the Song to the Qing dynasties, many temples were built in Shigang.

== Administrative divisions ==
At present, Tongzhou District has 19 towns.

19 towns

- Jinsha (金沙镇)
- Xiting (西亭镇)
- Erjia (二甲镇)
- Dongshe (东社镇)
- Sanyu (三余镇)
- Shizong (十总镇)
- Qi'an (骑岸镇)
- Wujia (五甲镇)
- Shigang (石港镇)
- Si'an (四安镇)
- Liuqiao (刘桥镇)
- Pingchao (平潮镇)
- Pingdong (平东镇)
- Wujie (五接镇)
- Xingren (兴仁镇)
- Xingdong (兴东镇)
- Chuanjiang (川姜镇)
- Xianfeng (先锋镇)
- Zhangzhishan (张芝山镇)

== Climate ==
Climate data for Tongzhou, elevation 4 m (13 ft), (1991–2020 normals, extremes 1991–present)
Month	Jan	Feb	Mar	Apr	May	Jun	Jul	Aug	Sep	Oct	Nov	Dec	Year
Record high °C (°F)	20.0 (68.0)	25.3 (77.5)	29.2 (84.6)	33.2 (91.8)	37.2 (99.0)	37.4 (99.3)	39.1 (102.4)	38.9 (102.0)	37.4 (99.3)	32.4 (90.3)	27.8 (82.0)	22.2 (72.0)	39.1 (102.4)
Mean daily maximum °C (°F)	7.4 (45.3)	9.5 (49.1)	13.9 (57.0)	20.0 (68.0)	25.3 (77.5)	28.0 (82.4)	32.0 (89.6)	31.5 (88.7)	27.7 (81.9)	22.7 (72.9)	16.8 (62.2)	10.2 (50.4)	20.4 (68.8)
Daily mean °C (°F)	3.4 (38.1)	5.2 (41.4)	9.2 (48.6)	14.8 (58.6)	20.2 (68.4)	23.9 (75.0)	28.0 (82.4)	27.7 (81.9)	23.6 (74.5)	18.2 (64.8)	12.3 (54.1)	5.8 (42.4)	16.0 (60.9)
Mean daily minimum °C (°F)	0.5 (32.9)	1.9 (35.4)	5.6 (42.1)	10.6 (51.1)	16.1 (61.0)	20.7 (69.3)	24.9 (76.8)	24.8 (76.6)	20.3 (68.5)	14.4 (57.9)	8.6 (47.5)	2.5 (36.5)	12.6 (54.6)
Record low °C (°F)	−9.6 (14.7)	−5.7 (21.7)	−3.9 (25.0)	−0.5 (31.1)	2.1 (35.8)	12.1 (53.8)	17.7 (63.9)	18.7 (65.7)	12.0 (53.6)	2.1 (35.8)	−3.9 (25.0)	−9.5 (14.9)	−9.6 (14.7)
Average precipitation mm (inches)	57.6 (2.27)	51.5 (2.03)	75.1 (2.96)	69.6 (2.74)	82.5 (3.25)	193.9 (7.63)	191.6 (7.54)	179.9 (7.08)	111.3 (4.38)	58.2 (2.29)	58.0 (2.28)	39.6 (1.56)	1,168.8 (46.01)
Average precipitation days (≥ 0.1 mm)	9.6	9.3	10.8	10.1	10.9	12.5	13.1	12.0	9.6	7.4	8.7	7.4	121.4
Average snowy days	2.6	2.3	0.6	0	0	0	0	0	0	0	0.2	0.6	6.3
Average relative humidity (%)	76	76	75	74	75	81	82	83	81	77	77	75	78
Mean monthly sunshine hours	122.2	124.0	151.8	175.1	182.2	129.8	174.6	194.3	168.8	168.7	137.6	138.3	1,867.4
Percentage possible sunshine	38	40	41	45	43	31	40	48	46	48	44	45	42
Source: China Meteorological Administration

== Local specialities ==
- Xiting Crackers (西亭脆饼)
- BBoss Beer (大富豪啤酒)
- Mahogany Carvings (红木雕刻)
- Zhengchang Bacon (正场熏肉)
- Xinzhong Fermented bean curd (新中乳腐)

== Transport ==
- Nantong West railway station
