= Chongchuan, Nantong =

Chongchuan 崇川区
- District
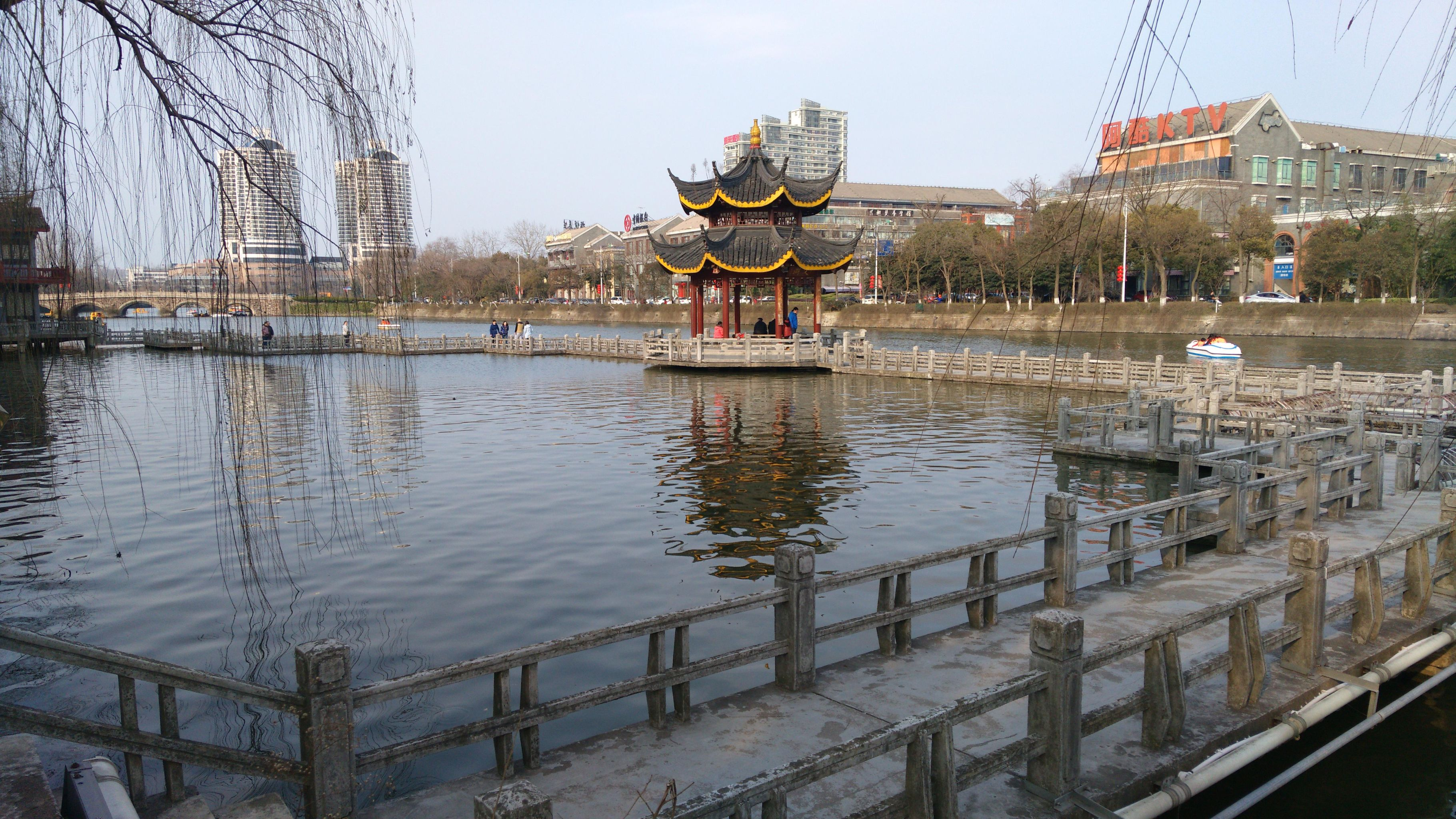

- Location in Jiangsu
- Coordinates (Chongchuan District government): 32°00′36″N 120°51′27″E
- Country: People's Republic of China
- Province: Jiangsu
- Prefecture-level city: Nantong
- Time zone: UTC+8 (China Standard)

Chongchuan District (simplified Chinese: 崇川区; traditional Chinese: 崇川區; pinyin: Chóngchuān Qū) is one of three urban districts of Nantong, Jiangsu province, China. The district has an area of 210 km^{2} (81 sq mi) and in 2001 the population was around 620,000.

The postal code for Chongchuan District is 226001 and the telephone code is 0513.

== Administrative divisions ==
At present, Chongchuan District has 13 subdistricts and 1 town.

13 Subdistricts

- Chengdong (城东街道)
- Rengang (任港街道)
- Hongqiao (虹桥街道)
- Xuetian (学田街道)
- Hepingqiao (和平桥街道)
- Xinchengqiao (新城桥街道)
- Zhongxiu (钟秀街道)
- Wenfeng (文峰街道)
- Zhongxing (中兴街道)
- Langshanzhen (狼山镇街道)
- Guanyinshan (观音山街道)
- Zhuxing (竹行街道)
- Xiaohai (小海街道)

1 Town

- Xinkai (新开镇)
