= Class 6 =

Class 6 may refer to:

- BR Standard Class 6, British 4-6-2 steam locomotive
- China Railways JF6
- G&SWR 6 Class
- HAZMAT Class 6 Toxic and infectious substances
- I-6-class submarine
- Indian locomotive class WAG-6A
- Indian locomotive class WAP-6
- Indian locomotive class WCM-6
- Indian locomotive class WDG-6G
- Indian locomotive class WDM-6
- Indian locomotive class WDS-6
- MGWR Class 6
- Midland Railway 6 Class
- LB&SCR E6 class
- LNER Class O6
- LSWR G6 class
- LSWR T6 class
- LSWR X6 class
- Milwaukee Road class F6
- NSB Class 6, a standard-gauge steam locomotive of Norway
- NSB Class VI, a narrow-gauge steam locomotive of Norway
- Class VI (U.S. Army), personal demand items (nonmilitary sales items)
  - Class Six Stores sell alcohol, and related items, such as mixers, soda, cigarettes, and drinking cups. Similar items are found at the POST or Base Exchange, but the primary function of Class Six Stores on military installations is alcohol sales.
- NSB El 6, an electric locomotive of Norway
- NSB Di 6, a diesel locomotive of Norway
- P 6-class torpedo boat
- Pennsylvania Railroad class B6
- Pennsylvania Railroad E6 class
- Pennsylvania Railroad class H6
- Red Flag 6-class locomotive
- Sa'ar 6-class corvette
- Speed Class Rating, the official unit of speed measurement for SD Cards
- SCORE Class 6, off-road racing vehicles
- South African Class 6 4-6-0
- South African Class 6E 4-6-0
- Southern Pacific class AC-6
- Southern Pacific class GS-6
- Southern Pacific class MC-6
- SR Class 6Pul
- TS Class 6, a tram type in Trondheim, Norway
- Class 6 truck, a US truck class for medium trucks, up to 26,000 pounds weight limit
- VR Class Sm6

== See also ==
- Class 06 (disambiguation)
- Type 6 (disambiguation)
