= Zikhron Ya'aqov railway station =

Railway station in Israel

Zikhron Ya'aqov railway station תחנת הרכבת זכרון יעקב
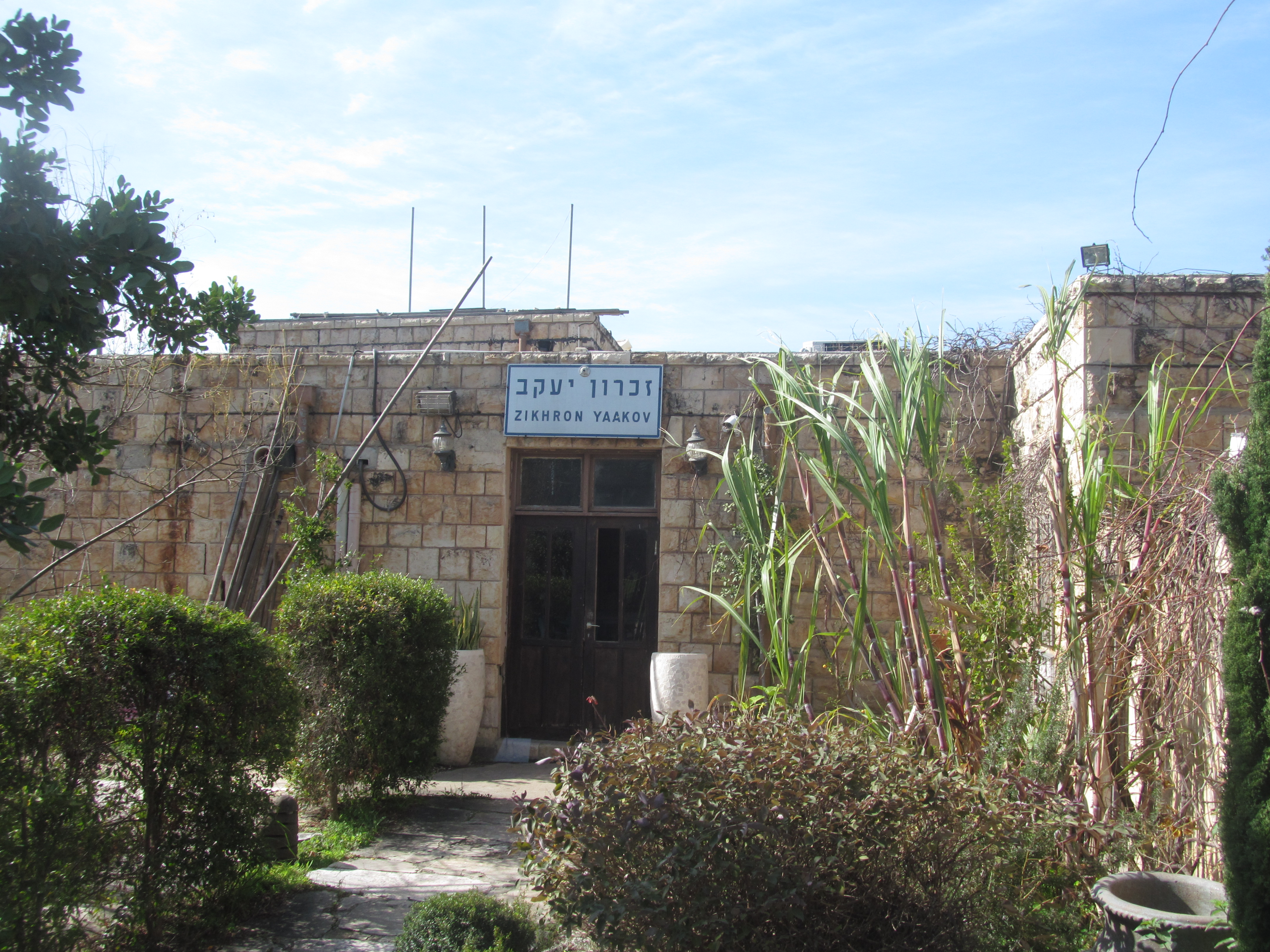

General information
- Location: Behind Mall Zichron Shopping Center and near the western entrance to Zichron Ya’akov off of Highway 4
- Coordinates: 32.570677°N 34.931954°E
- Owner: Israel Railways
- Line: Coastal railway line, Israel

History
- Opened: 1930s
- Closed: 1996
Location

Zikhron Ya'aqov railway station is an inactive railway station on the Coastal railway in Israel. It is located 2 km west of the town of Zikhron Ya'akov.

== History ==
The station was constructed by Palestine Railways on its main line which ran from Haifa to Kantarah in Egypt. Following the establishment of the state of Israel, Israel Railways inaugurated passenger service at Zikhron Ya'akov on 4 January 1949. The station remained in service until the late 1990s, when the high-speed Haifa–Binyamina–Tel Aviv service was separated from the newly created Binyamina–Tel Aviv suburban service: Zikhron Yaakov station was deemed too minor for the high-speed service, and too remote for the suburban service (which terminates at Binyamina station, about 10 kilometers south of Zikhron station).

Since the 2000s, recommencement of passenger service at Zikhron Yaakov railway station had been considered for inclusion into each of the Israel Railways five-year development plans, but has so far not received approval by the railway authorities, despite several public petitions.

The historic station building is still owned and maintained by Israel Railways; for some time in the 2010s, it had housed a café. Also in the 2010s, a large shopping center and a multiplex movie theater was built next to the station, serving the surrounding region which is mostly rural in character.

== Gallery ==
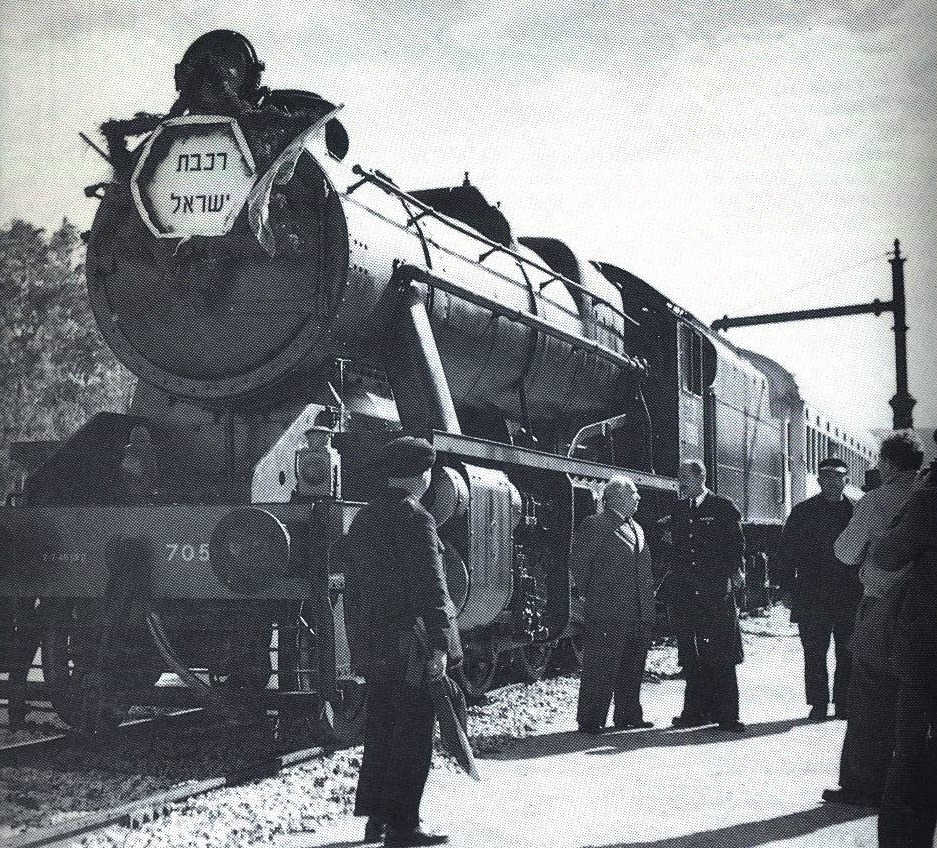
Stanier 8F 2-8-0 70513 heading the first Israel Railways service from Haifa to Hadera (4/1/1949), taking water at Zikhron Ya'akov station

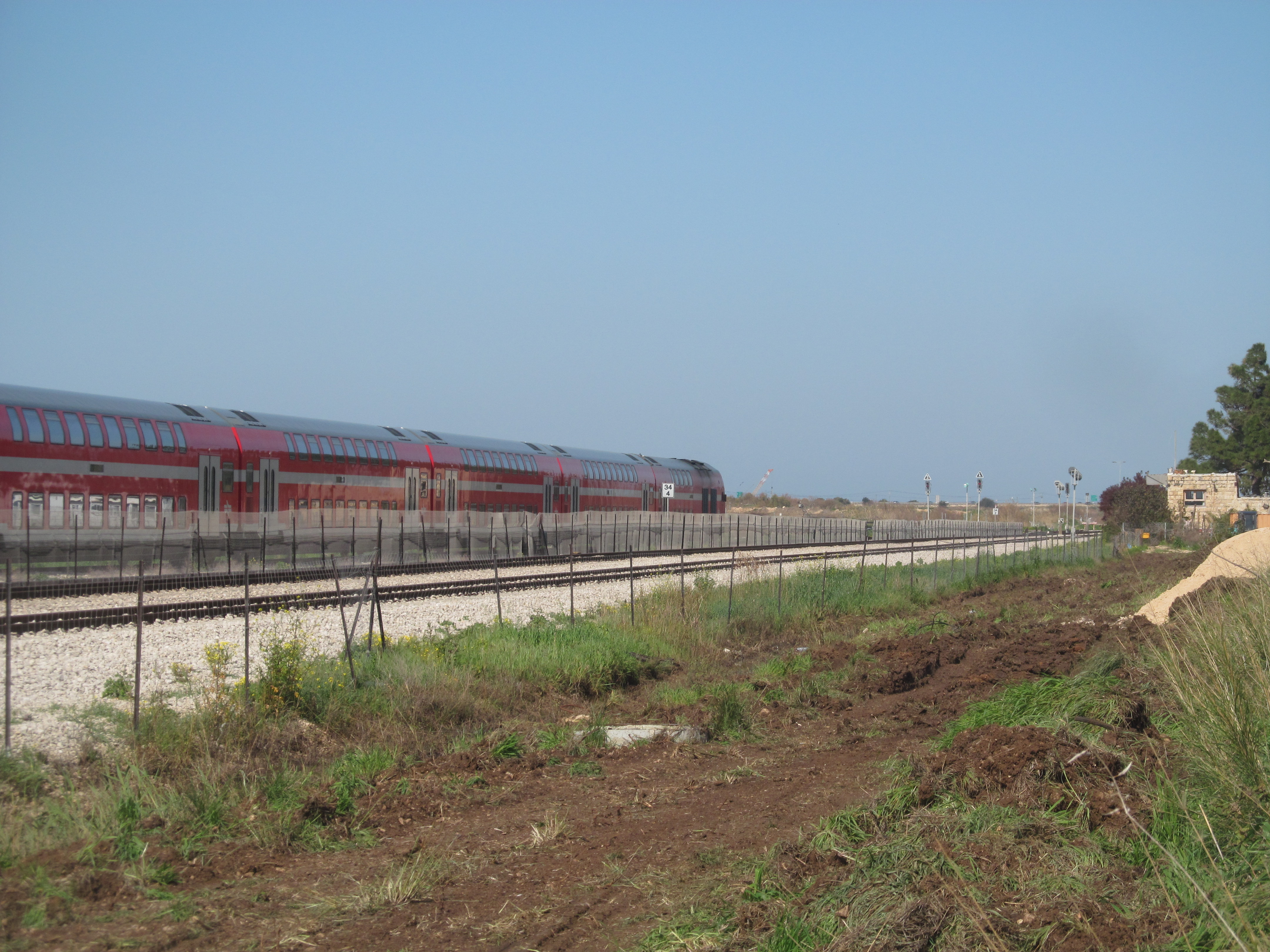
A modern Israel Railways Bombardier Double-deck Coach stabled on the passing loop of the old station, opposite the historic station building
