= LNER Class O6 =

Class of British steam locomotives

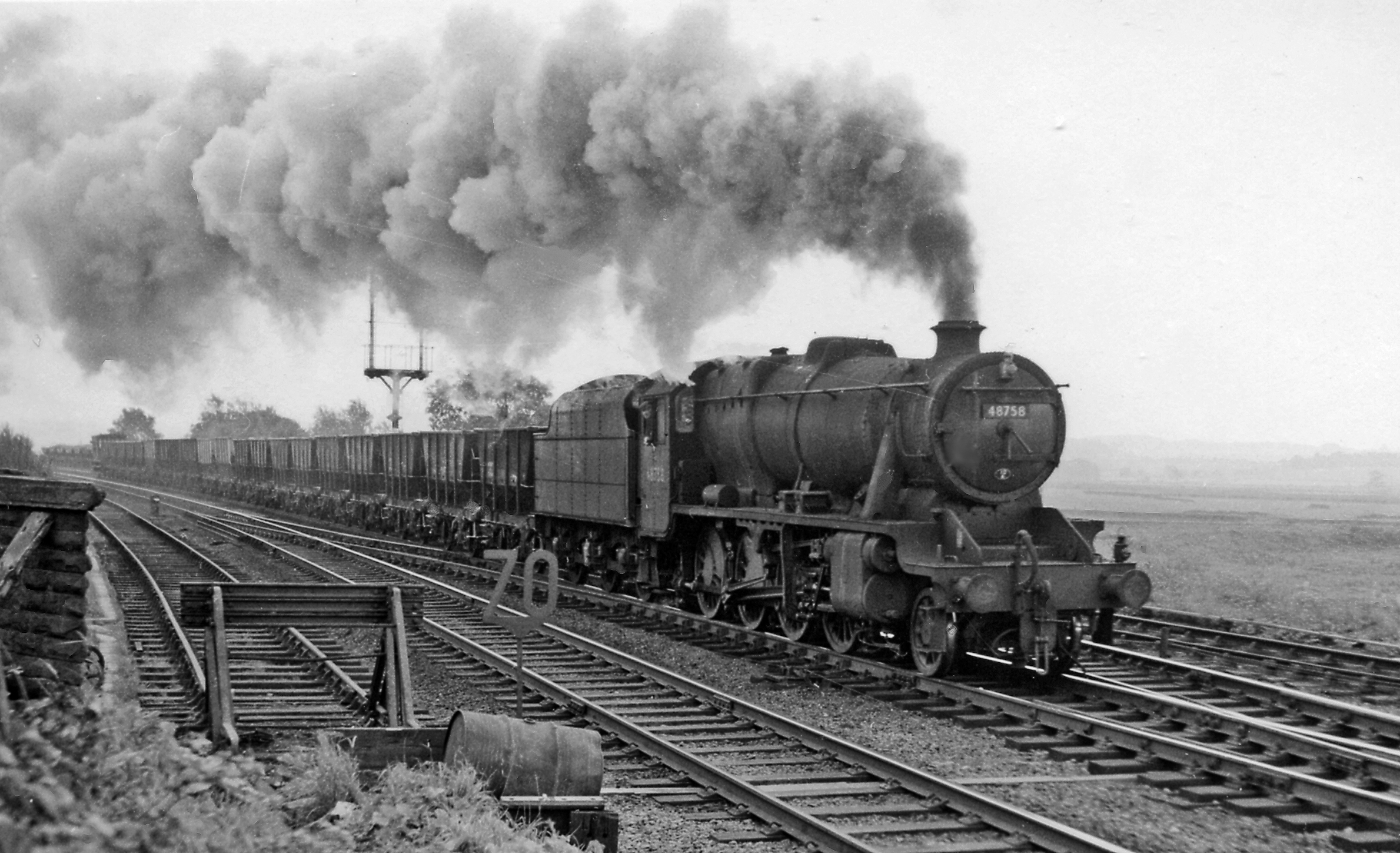
An LNER Class O6 on the Settle - Carlisle line in 1962

The London and North Eastern Railway (LNER) Class O6 was a sub-class of the Stanier Class 8F.

== Background ==
The LMS Stanier Class 8F 2-8-0 had been chosen by the War Department to be its standard heavy freight locomotive. As a result, 60 were built by the LNER to Railway Executive Committee order between 1943 and 1945. These were considered LMS stock and numbered as such (LMS Nos 8500-59). These were loaned by the REC to the LNER. The LNER subsequently chose to build some of the design for themselves.

== Construction ==
Construction was divided between Darlington Works and Doncaster Works. 25 were also subcontracted to the Southern Railway's Brighton Works, which had also built 8Fs for the Railway Executive Committee.

pre-1946 Nos	1946 Nos	1947 Nos	Date	Built at	Builders Nos	LMS Nos	BR Nos
7651–75	3100–24	3500–24	1944	Brighton	—	8705–29	48705–29
—	3125–34	3525–34	1945	Darlington	1967–76	8730–09	48730–39
—	3135–47	3535–47	1946	Darlington	1977-89	8740–52	48740–52
—	3148–55	3548–55	1945	Doncaster	1554–61	8753–60	48753–60
—	3156–57	3556–57	1946	Doncaster	1562–63	8761–62	48761–62
—	3158–67	3558–67	1946	Doncaster	1991–99, 2001	8763–72	48763–72

== Service ==
Their time in LNER service was short. The LNER quickly took on replacements for them in the form of the WD Austerity 2-8-0, which they classified as Class O7. The on-loan LMS stock 8Fs were returned to the LMS in 1946 and 1947 and in a reversal of the arrangement, the O6s were subsequently leased to the LMS. This helped standardisation as it concentrated all of the 8Fs on LMS lines. As they were withdrawn from LNER stock and taken into LMS stock in 1946 and 1947 the LMS renumbered them into the 8705–72 series to conform with the numbering system of their other 8Fs.

The LNER and the LMS were both nationalised to form British Railways on 1 January 1948. By then, the size of Class O6 had been reduced to 1; LNER No. 3554 which was transferred to the London Midland Region in January 1948. Thus class O6 was rendered extinct by the transferral to another class, the LMS Stanier 8F class, and they subsequently retained their LMS numbers with the addition of 40000 standard to LMS types. Their subsequent history is therefore considered as LMS Stanier Class 8F.

== Preservation ==
Subsequently, none of the former LNER Class O6 engines were preserved. However, engine 48518 (LMS 8518), one of 30 built in 1944–45 by Doncaster Works for the LMS, ended up in the Woodham Brothers scrapyard at Barry, and has survived as one of the 'Barry Ten'. This engine lost its tender during its time in the yard, and in 2008, lost its boiler to assist with the construction of new-built GWR 'County' class 4-6-0 1014 County of Glamorgan. Further parts are expected to be used to assist with the construction of new-build LMS 'Patriot' 4-6-0 45551 The Unknown Warrior, and it is believed that as a result of this, 48518 will not be restored in its own right (though it could be feasibly restored).

It has been suggested that 48518 could be restored in conjunction with fellow 'Barry Ten' locomotive, LMS 'Black Five' 44901. This was reported by Steam Railway magazine in 2012, but at present nothing has been said of this proposal and it is unlikely that these two locos will ever be restored.
