= Class 06 =

Class 06 may refer to:

- British Rail Class 06, a class of post-war, British diesel-mechanical shunter
- DRB Class 06, a class of inter-war, German, standard steam locomotive for express train services

== See also ==
- Class 6 (disambiguation)
