= Model 6 =

Model 6 may refer to:

- Ingram Model 6, a .45 ACP caliber submachine gun
- Boeing Model 6, a small biplane flying boat designed shortly after World War I

== See also ==
- Type 6 (disambiguation)
