= LMS Stanier Class 8F 8233 =

LMS 8233
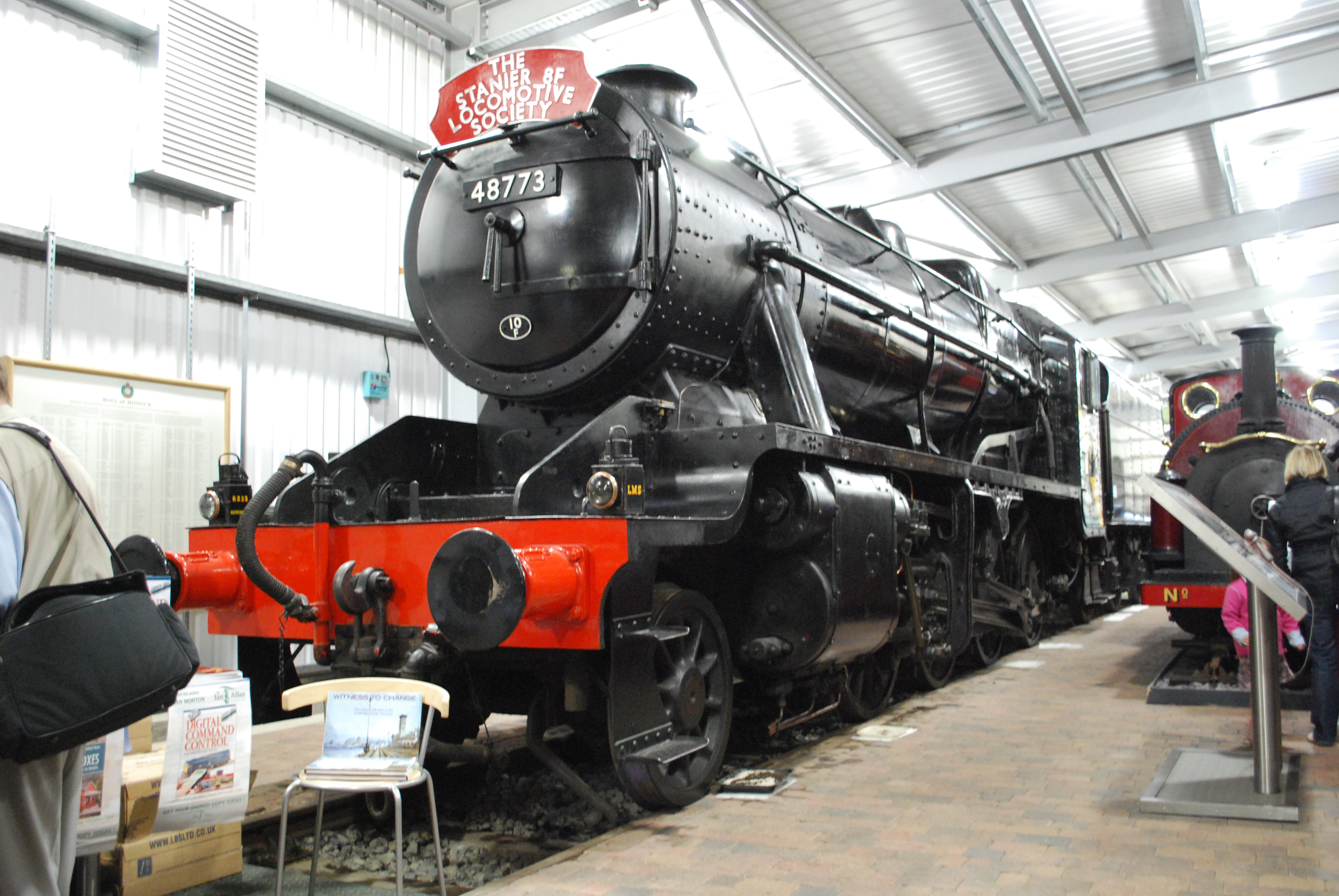
- 48773 on display inside the Engine House on the Severn Valley Railway.
Type and origin
- Power type: Steam
- Designer: William Stanier
- Builder: North British Locomotive Company
- Serial number: 24607
- Build date: 1940
Specifications
- Configuration
  - Whyte: 2-8-0
  - UIC: 1′D h2
- Gauge: 4 ft 8 1/2 in (1,435 mm) standard gauge
- Leading dia.: 3 ft 3 1/2 in (1.003 m)
- Driver dia.: 4 ft 8 1/2 in (1.435 m)
- Length: 63 ft 0 1/2 in (19.22 m)
- Loco weight: 72.10 long tons (73.26 t; 80.75 short tons)
- Fuel type: Coal
- Fuel capacity: 9 long tons (9.1 t; 10.1 short tons)
- Water cap.: 4,000 imp gal (18,000 L; 4,800 US gal)
- Firebox
  - Grate area: 28 1/2 sq ft (2.65 m^{2})
- Boiler: LMS type 3C
- Boiler pressure: 225 lbf/in^{2} (1.55 MPa)
- Cylinders: Two, outside
- Cylinder size: 18 1/2 in × 28 in (470 mm × 711 mm)
- Valve gear: Walschaerts
- Valve type: Piston valves
Performance figures
- Tractive effort: 32,440 lbf (144.30 kN)
Career
- Operators: London, Midland and Scottish Railway; → War Department; → Iranian State Railways; → Longmoor Military Railway; → British Railways
- Power class: LMS & BR: 7F, later 8F
- Numbers: LMS: 8233; WD: 307; ISR: 41-109; LMR: 500; BR: 48773
- Axle load class: Route Availability 6
- Withdrawn: 4 August 1968
- Current owner: The Stanier 8F Locomotive Society
- Disposition: Static Display

LMS Stanier Class 8F No. 8233, War Department Nos. 307, and later 70307, Iranian State Railways No. 41-109, Longmoor Military Railway 500, British Railways No. 48773, is a preserved British steam locomotive. Its owners claim that it is "possibly Britain's most travelled preserved locomotive".

== Construction and use by the LMS ==
8233 was originally built in 1940 by the North British Locomotive Company of Glasgow, Works No. 24607 on the orders of the War Department, which had adopted the LMS Stanier Class 8F as its own standard. However, the Fall of France saw that it was not sent to mainland Europe with the British Expeditionary Force, as originally intended. Instead, it became LMS No. 8233 and was based out of Toton, Holbeck and Westhouses sheds.

== Export ==
In 1941, No. 8233 was requisitioned by the War Department and sent to Persia (Iran), becoming Iranian State Railways No. 41-109, during which time, it derailed following a collision with a camel. In 1944, it was converted to oil-firing. In 1948, it was at Suez needing a new firebox and was almost scrapped, but was then returned to England in 1952 and overhauled at Derby Works. In 1954, the engine was no longer needed in the Middle East and went instead to the Longmoor Military Railway as WD. No. 500.

== British Rail and withdrawal ==
In 1957, No. 500 was taken into British Railways stock as No. 48773. It was initially allocated to Polmadie (66A), and was withdrawn from there in 1962. However, it was reinstated in 1963 and transferred to Carlisle Kingmoor (12A). It was then transferred to Stockport (Edgeley, 9B) and Buxton (9L, though perhaps only on paper), and then to Bolton (9K) in September 1964. With the end of steam approaching, No. 48773 was transferred to the North West, moving to Rose Grove (10F) in July 1968. It worked its last main line train on 4 August 1968.

During its last few years of service, No. 48773 had a diagonal yellow stripe painted on its cab side to indicate it was unable to operate south of Crewe as its top-feed was deemed to be out of gauge under the new 25 kV AC overhead electrification. However, as the locomotive's original War Department top-feed had been replaced by one of LMS pattern, enthusiasts have stated the cabside stripe was unnecessary since it would have in fact been within the loading gauge.

== Preservation ==
In 1968, it was the subject of a late appeal to purchase it for preservation, it was then restored on the Severn Valley Railway. In 1975, it took part in the Shildon cavalcade as part of the 150th anniversary of Stockton and Darlington Railway. In 1977 it was featured in the original BBC 1 drama Survivors.

In 1986, it was dedicated as a national war memorial to all British railway transport troops who died on active service in the Second World War.

As of January 2014, it is on display in the Engine House, awaiting overhaul.

Now retired from service, the locomotive requires a heavy overhaul, including mechanical and boiler work. It is thought that the locomotive will need new tyres and a new inner firebox to be operational again
