= FS Class 737 =

Anglo-Italian steam locomotive class

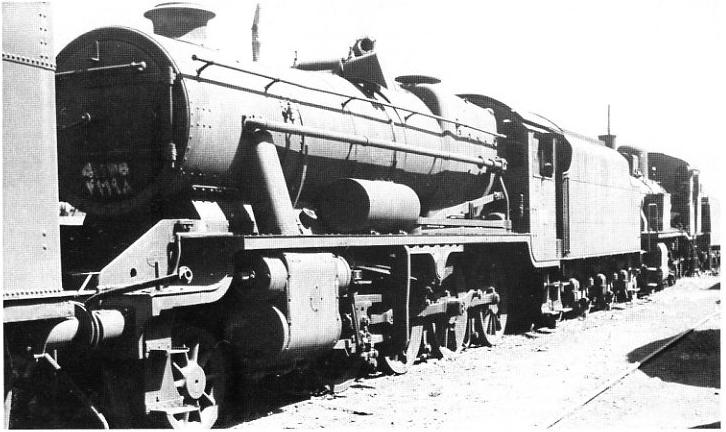
FS 737.014 after withdrawal in 1953

The Ferrovie dello Stato (Italian State Railways, FS) Class 737 (Italian: Gruppo 737) was a class of steam locomotive which consisted of 15 ex-British War Department (WD) 2-8-0 locomotives of the LMS Stanier Class 8F type which were purchased in 1946.

== History ==
The first eight engines, (eventually FS Numbers 737.001 – 737.008) were built to WD orders between 1940 and 1942. The remaining seven (eventually FS Numbers 737.009 – 737.015) had been requisitioned by the War Department in 1941 from the London Midland & Scottish Railway (LMS) - these had been built in 1936 by the Vulcan Foundry. All were then shipped to the Middle East, with several more classmates, where they served in Persia and were numbered in the Persian series. In 1944, 50 of the Persian engines were transferred to Kingdom of Egypt/Mandate Palestine, where they were again renumbered into the Middle East Forces (MEF) 93xx series. Later WD numbers were original numbers plus +70000, and in 1946 FS bought fifteen of these.

As they were non-standard in comparison to Italian locomotive practices, their career were relatively short, with the Class 737s working on the line between Bologna and Ancona until 1947 where after they were kept at Bari. They were all withdrawn from service in 1953 with them being scrapped in 1956.

== Numbering ==
Numbers were as follows:

FS No.	LMS No.	WD No.	Persia No.	MEF No.	Later WD No.	Date built	Builder	Builder's No.	Withdrawn
737.001	-	334	41.119	9380	70334	1940	North British Locomotive Company	24634	1956
737.002	-	375	41.164	9372	70375	1941	North British Locomotive Company	24675	1956
737.003	-	408	41.104	9381	70408	1941	Beyer, Peacock & Company	6988	1956
737.004	-	437	41.177	9374	70437	1941	Beyer, Peacock & Company	7017	1956
737.005	-	441	41.166	9362	70441	1941	Beyer, Peacock & Company	7021	1956
737.006	-	514	41.210	9368	70514	1941	North British Locomotive Company	24722	1956
737.007	-	520	41.238	9363	70520	1941	North British Locomotive Company	24728	1956
737.008	-	548	41.223	-	70548	1942	North British Locomotive Company	24741	1956
737.009	8032	585	41.162	9378	70585	1936	Vulcan Foundry	4709	1956
737.010	8091	589	41.185	9351	70589	1936	Vulcan Foundry	4768	1956
737.011	8038	594	41.182	9370	70594	1936	Vulcan Foundry	4715	1956
737.012	8040	595	41.192	9355	70595	1936	Vulcan Foundry	4717	1956
737.013	8044	598	41.196	9371	70598	1936	Vulcan Foundry	4721	1956
737.014	8072	609	41.198	9373	70609	1936	Vulcan Foundry	4749	1956
737.015	8059	613	41.195	9352	70613	1936	Vulcan Foundry	4736	1956

== See also ==
- FS Class 736
- Palestine Railways
- Trans-Iranian Railway

== Sources ==
- Kalla-Bishop, P. M. (1986). Italian State Railways Steam Locomotives. Abingdon: Tourret Publishing. pp. 68–69. ISBN 0-905878-03-5.
- Rowledge, J.W.P. (1975). Engines of the LMS built 1923–51. Oxford: Oxford Publishing Company. ISBN 0-902888-59-5.
- Tourret, R. (1995). Allied Military Locomotives of the Second World War. Abingdon, Oxon: Tourret Publishing. ISBN 0-905878-06-X.
- Turchi, Gian Guido (November 1982). "Locomotive a vapore FS 737". I Treni Oggi (in Italian) (24): 10–14.
