= Type 6 =

Type 6 may refer to:

- Peugeot Type 6, an automobile by the manufacturer Peugeot
- Japanese Type 6 submarine
- Spinocerebellar ataxia type 6, a rare, late-onset, autosomal dominant disorder
- Bristol Type 6 T.T.A, a British two-seat, twin-engine biplane
- Type 6 fire engine
- Bugatti Type 6, a prototype automobile designed by Ettore Bugatti
- Mucopolysaccharidosis type 6, a form of mucopolysaccharidosis
- C-C chemokine receptor type 6, a CC chemokine receptor

== See also ==
- Class 6 (disambiguation)
- Model 6 (disambiguation)
