= GWR 1000 Class 1014 County of Glamorgan =

British steam locomotive construction project

GWR 1014 “County of Glamorgan”
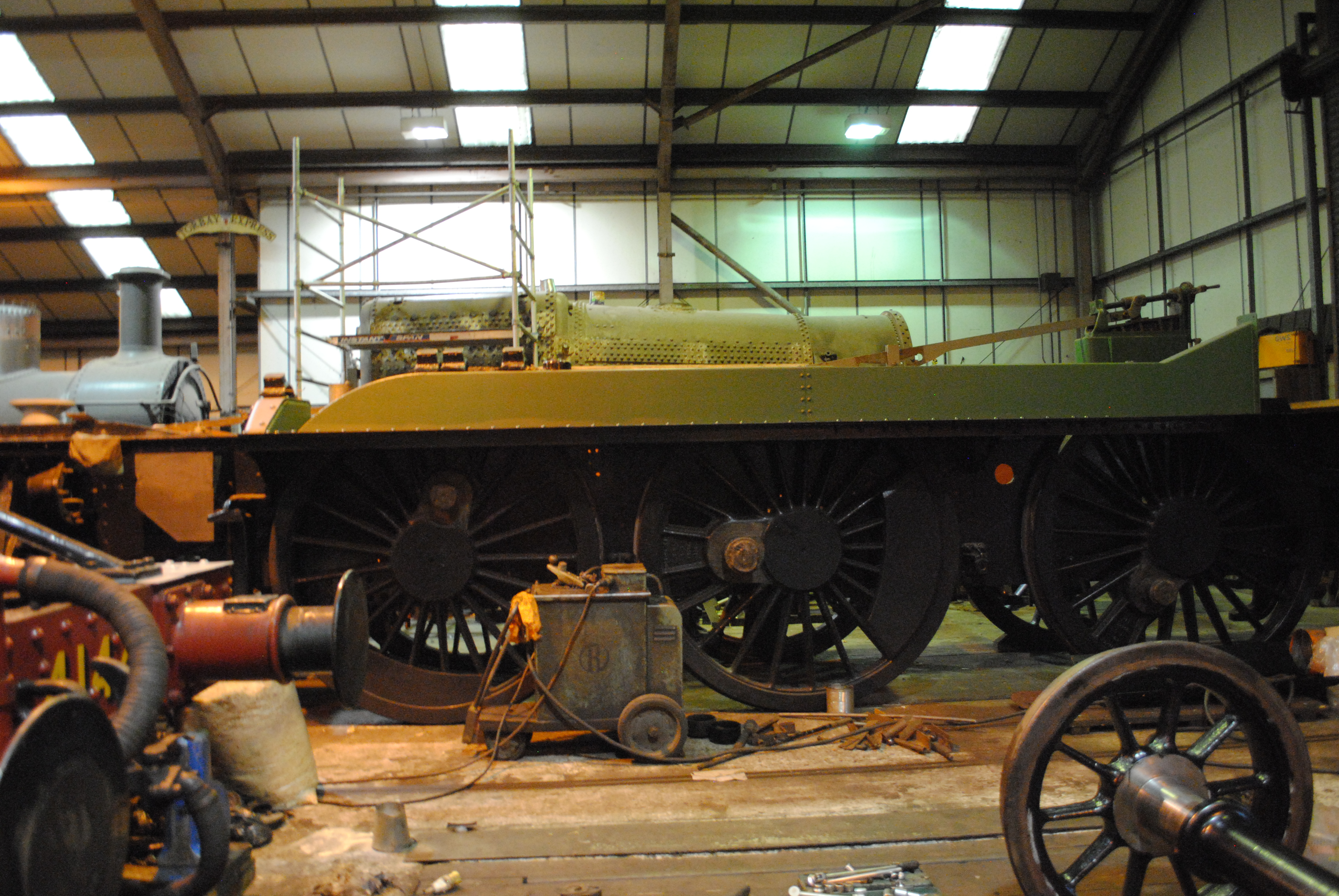
- The new-build GWR 1014 'County of Glamorgan' inside Didcot Railway Centre's workshop.
Type and origin
- Power type: Steam
- Designer: Frederick Hawksworth
- Builder: Original - GWR Swindon Works, Replica - The G.W. County Project
- Build date: Original - February 1946 Replica - 2005-Ongoing
Specifications
- Configuration
  - Whyte: 4-6-0
  - UIC: 2'Ch2
- Gauge: 4 ft 8 1/2 in (1,435 mm) standard gauge
- Leading dia.: 3 ft 0 in (914 mm)
- Driver dia.: 6 ft 3 in (1,905 mm)
- Minimum curve: 8 chains (528 ft; 161 m) normal, 7 chains (462 ft; 141 m) slow
- Length: 63 ft 0 1/4 in (19.21 m)
- Width: 8 ft 11 1/8 in (2.721 m)
- Height: Original - 13 ft 5 in (4.089 m) Modified - 13 ft 1 in (3.988 m)
- Axle load: 19 long tons 14 cwt (44,100 lb or 20 t) (22.1 short tons) full
- Adhesive weight: 59 long tons 2 cwt (132,400 lb or 60 t) (66.2 short tons) full
- Loco weight: 76 long tons 17 cwt (172,100 lb or 78.1 t) (86.1 short tons)full
- Tender weight: 49 long tons 0 cwt (109,800 lb or 49.8 t) (54.9 short tons) full
- Fuel type: Coal
- Fuel capacity: 7 long tons 0 cwt (15,700 lb or 7.1 t) (7.8 short tons)
- Water cap.: 4,000 imp gal (18,000 L; 4,800 US gal)
- Firebox
  - Grate area: 28.84 sq ft (2.679 m^{2})
- Boiler: LMS type 3C
- Boiler pressure: 280 psi (1.93 MPa) later reduced to 250 psi (1.72 MPa)
- Heating surface
  - Firebox: 169.0 sq ft (15.70 m^{2})
  - Tubes and flues: 1,545.0 sq ft (143.54 m^{2})
- Superheater
  - Heating area: 254.0 sq ft (23.60 m^{2})
- Cylinders: Two, outside
- Cylinder size: 18.5 in × 30 in (470 mm × 762 mm)
- Valve gear: Stephenson
- Valve type: piston valves
Performance figures
- Tractive effort: 32,580 lbf (144.92 kN), later reduced to 29,090 lbf (129.40 kN)
Career
- Operators: Great Western Railway; British Railways
- Class: GWR 1000 Class
- Power class: GWR: D BR: 6MT
- Numbers: 1014
- Axle load class: GWR: Red
- Retired: April 1964
- Disposition: Original locomotive scrapped, mock under construction

No.1014 County of Glamorgan is a project to construct a new build steam locomotive replica of a member of Frederick Hawksworth's Great Western Railway 1000 or "County" Class based at Didcot Railway Centre in Didcot, Oxfordshire.

The "County" class were built for use on the Great Western Railway between 1945 and 1947, but all were withdrawn and scrapped in the early 1960s. The project was launched in 2005 with parts from an original Modified Hall No. 7927 Willington Hall and a LMS Stanier Class 8F being utilised in its construction.

The project is building a replica of a specific locomotive, 1014 County of Glamorgan which was built in 1946 and scrapped in 1964.

== Original County of Glamorgan ==
The original engine was built unnamed in February 1946 and was allocated to Bristol Bath Road. She received her name County of Glamorgan in March 1948 and during the same year she was taken into British Railways ownership. She received a double chimney in May 1958 and in September 1960 she was transferred to Bristol St Philip's Marsh. Further transfers during her career included to Neyland and Shrewsbury with her final shed allocation being at Swindon.

=== Allocations and history ===
The locations of the original 1014 on particular dates.

31 March 1946 (First Shed)	Bristol Bath Road, BRD then 82A
10 September 1960	Bristol St Philip's Marsh, 82B
7 October 1961	Neyland, 87H
9 March 1963	Shrewsbury, 89A
29 September 1963	Swindon, 82C
4 April 1964	Withdrawn
December 1964	Scrapped at Cashmores Scrapyard, Newport

=== Withdrawal and scrapping ===
She was withdrawn from Swindon's 82C shed in April 1964 with a running life of 18 years and 2 months. Following a period of storage after her withdrawal she was sent to Cashmore's scrapyard in Newport and was cut up in December 1964.

== Replica ==
The project was launched in 2005 with the creation of the 'Three Counties Agreement' between the Great Western Society (GWS) and the Vale of Glamorgan Council. This agreement saw three members of the Barry Ten, a collection of unsold scrapyard steam locomotives that were rescued from Woodham Brothers in 1990, being used to help resurrect extinct GWR locomotives.

GWR 1000 Class No. 1014 County of Glamorgan, GWR 3800 Class No. 3840 County of Montgomery, a GWR 2221 Class tank engine, and a GWR 4700 Class No. 4709 are all planned to be constructed from the parts of GWR 2800 Class No. 2861, GWR 5101 Class No. 4115, GWR 5205 Class No. 5227, GWR 6959 Class No. 7927 Willington Hall and LMS 8F No. 48518.

Since none of the original County class engines survived into preservation (the last being 1011 County of Chester was withdrawn in November 1964 and sent straight for scrap at Cashmore's, Newport), it was decided by members at the Didcot Railway Centre to build a representation of one of the original engines from GWR & BR days instead of building the next member of the class as a large number of new build engines were being built at the time as new members of the class.

Parts from an original Modified Hall No. 7927 Willington Hall and LMS Stanier Class 8F No. 48518 have been used in the project (parts included the frames from 7927 and boiler from 48518), the frames of 48518 and boiler from 7927 later being sent to the Llangollen Railway with the boiler being used on new-build GWR 6800 Class 4-6-0 No. 6880 Betton Grange. Like other new-build projects, a large number of new parts have to be constructed which included the driving wheels as no other class of GWR engine other than the county's had 6 ft 3 in driving wheels and the wheels that had come with 7927 being 6 ft in size. Original County parts are also being used in the construction of 1014 which include the original chimney from 1006 County of Cornwall, the regulator from 1011 County of Chester & the reverser from 1024 County of Pembroke.

The original height of the county's was 13 ft 5in, but the max height allowed for steam locomotives to work on the mainline by Network Rail because of overhead wires clearances is 13 ft 1 in. Because building the replica to its original height would result in only being able to operate it on heritage railways as its height would be over the max allowed and because the engine's owners plan to operate the completed replica engine on the mainline, the engine is being built with a slightly smaller height. In order to operate on the mainline when completed, the engine will also require the fitment of: Speedometer, AWS, TPWS, OTMR & GSM-R.

There will also be some modifications done to the engine's tender as it is common now for engines to carry more water than they originally did and less coal because of there being no water columns on the mainline other than a few select locations (most stops being done by either hydrants or roadside tankers) and the water troughs have long since disappeared. A support coach to carry tools and spare parts for the engine, as well as crew members, will also have to be examined. The plan is to not fit the engine with the required mainline equipment at first when completed, but when funding has been raised from running as well as a possible appeal mandatory equipment will be fitted to the engine for future mainline operations.

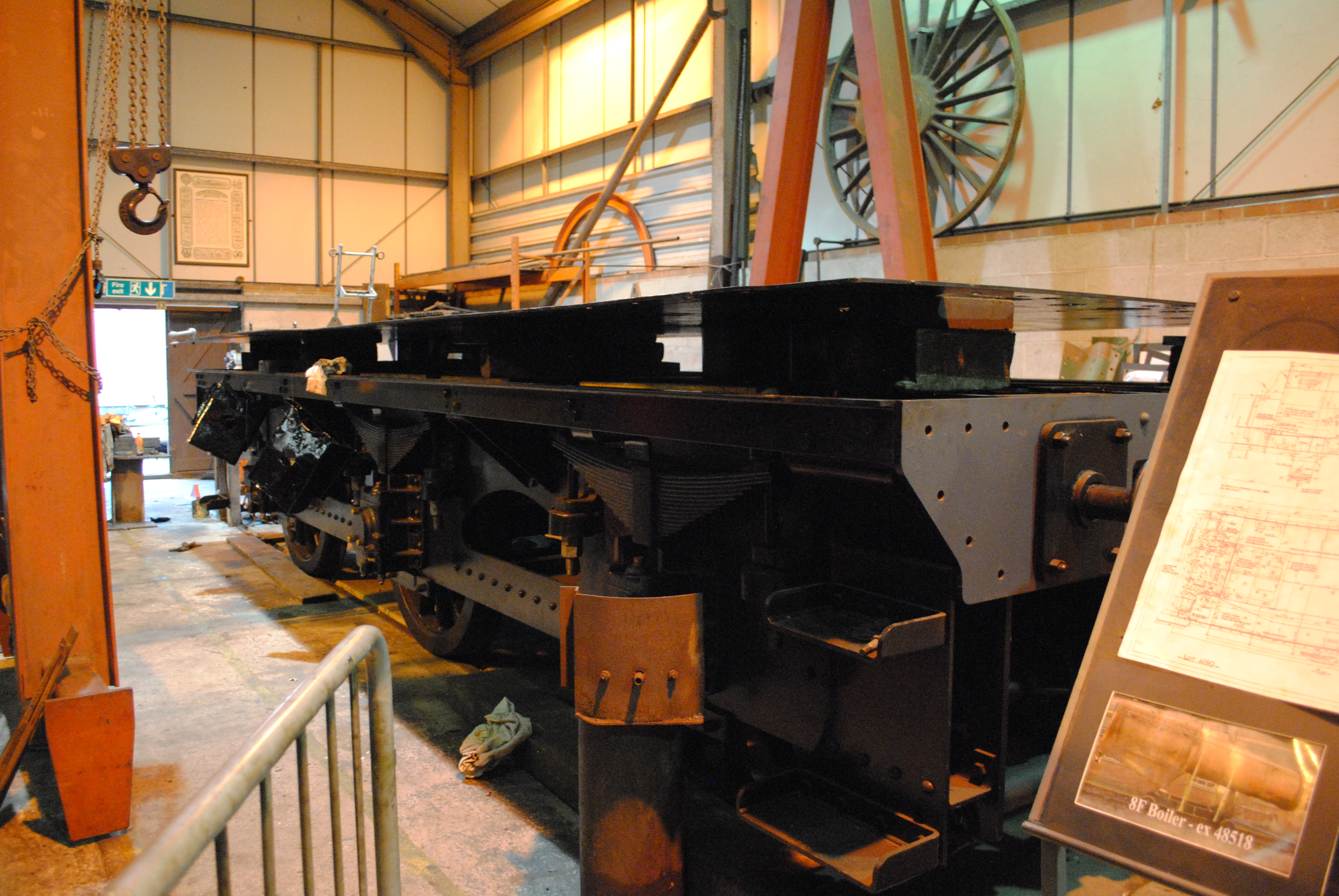
1014's tender inside Didcot Railway Centre's locomotive workshop.

In the past few years, much progress has been done to ensure that the locomotive is fully functionally in the near future. In 2019, its plates were completed. In 2020, two very important milestones were reached. In September 2020, it was announced that the tubeplates for the locomotive were completed. It was also announced that the locomotive will have a three-row super heater. The second milestone was announced on the 4th of November in 2020. That being that funding for the locomotive reached £980,000 in fundraising campaigns.
