= LMS Stanier Class 8F =

Class of 852 British 2-8-0 freight locomotives

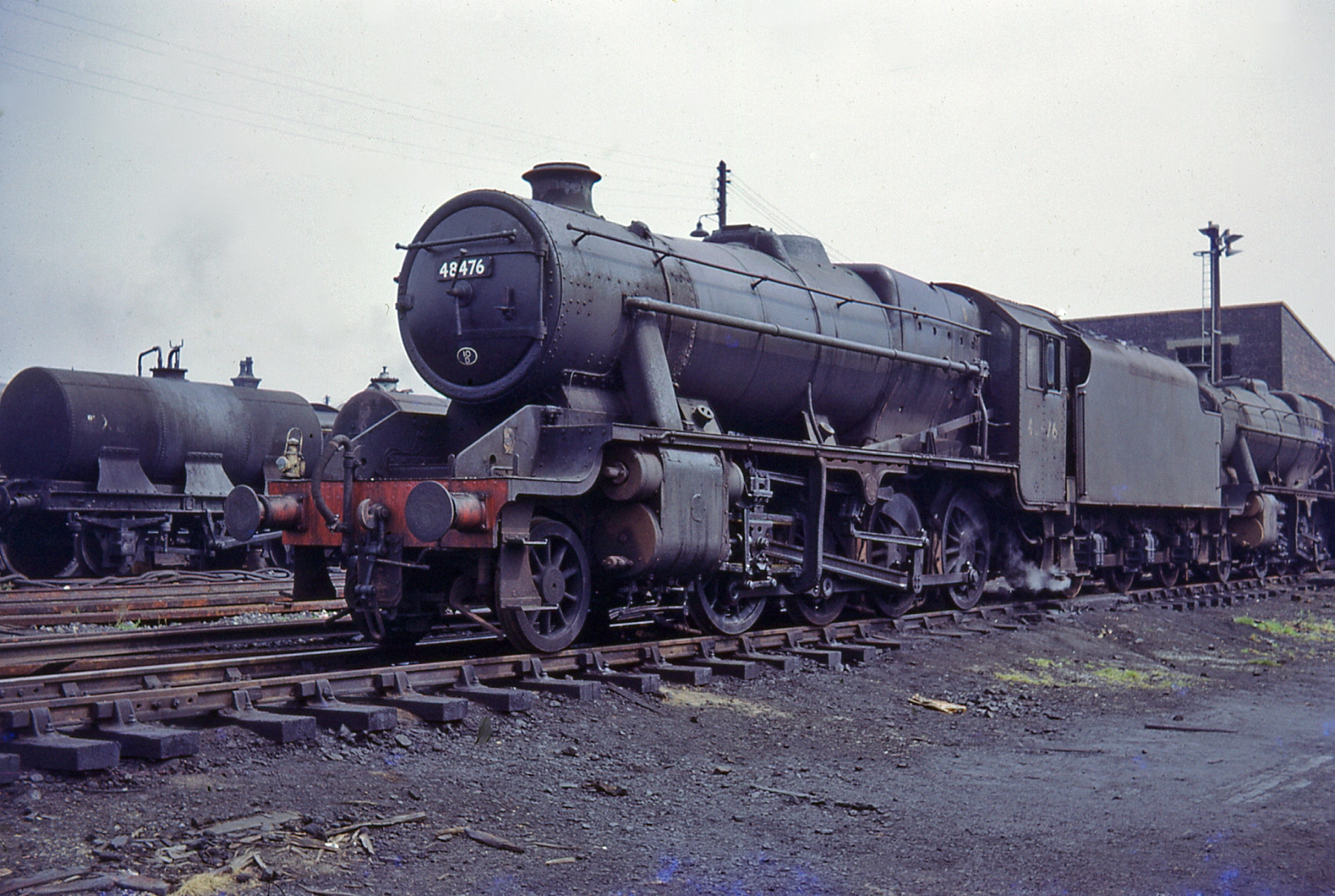
- Stanier 8F No. 48476 at Lostock Hall shed, late July 1968
Type and origin
- Power type: Steam
- Designer: William Stanier
- Builder: LMS Crewe Works - (137); LMS Horwich Works - (75); North British Locomotive Co. - (208); LNER Darlington Works - (53); LNER Doncaster Works - (50); GWR Swindon Works - (80); Vulcan Foundry - (69); SR Brighton Works - (93); SR Eastleigh Works - (23); SR Ashford Works - (14); Beyer, Peacock & Co. for REC and MoS orders); (50)
- Build date: 1935–1946
- Total produced: 852
Specifications
- Configuration
  - Whyte: 2-8-0
  - UIC: 1′D h2
- Gauge: 4 ft 8 1/2 in (1,435 mm) standard gauge
- Leading dia.: 3 ft 3 1/2 in (1.003 m)
- Driver dia.: 4 ft 8 1/2 in (1.435 m)
- Wheelbase: 52 ft 7 3/4 in (16.046 m)
- Length: 63 ft 0 1/2 in (19.22 m)
- Loco weight: 72.10 long tons (73.26 t; 80.75 short tons)
- Fuel type: Coal
- Fuel capacity: 9 long tons (9.1 t; 10.1 short tons)
- Water cap.: 4,000 imp gal (18,000 L; 4,800 US gal)
- Firebox
  - Grate area: 28 1/2 sq ft (2.65 m^{2})
- Boiler: LMS type 3C
- Boiler pressure: 225 lbf/in^{2} (1.55 MPa)
- Heating surface
  - Firebox: 171 sq ft (15.9 m^{2})
  - Tubes: 1,479 sq ft (137.4 m^{2})
- Superheater
  - Heating area: 215–245 sq ft (20.0–22.8 m^{2})
- Cylinders: Two, outside
- Cylinder size: 18 1/2 in × 28 in (470 mm × 711 mm)
Performance figures
- Power output: 1,300–1,400 hp (969–1,040 kW; 1,320–1,420 PS)
- Tractive effort: 32,440 lbf (144.30 kN)
Career
- Operators: London, Midland and Scottish Railway; London and North Eastern Railway; War Department; Trans-Iranian Railway; Palestine Railways; Egyptian State Railways; Iraqi State Railways; Ferrovie dello Stato; Türkiye Cumhuriyeti Devlet Demiryolları; British Railways; Israel Railways
- Power class: LMS & BR: 7F, later 8F
- Axle load class: Route Availability 6
- Withdrawn: BR: 1960–1968
- Disposition: 12 preserved, 2 dumped in Turkey but still extant, 1 parts donor, 23 lost at sea, remainder scrapped

The London, Midland and Scottish Railway (LMS) Stanier Class 8F is a class of steam locomotives designed for hauling heavy freight. 852 were built between 1935 and 1946 (not all to LMS order), as a freight version of William Stanier's successful Black Five, and the class saw extensive service overseas during and after the Second World War.

== Background ==
LMS freight traction suffered from the adoption of the Midland Railway's small engine policy which had left it with trains double-headed by underpowered 0-6-0s supplemented by disappointing Garratts and Fowler 7F 0-8-0s.

The 8F design incorporated the two-cylinder arrangement of the Black Fives. They were initially classified 7F, but this was later changed to 8F.

On the outbreak of the World War II, the design was chosen to become the country's standard freight design, reprising the role the GCR Class 8K had in the First World War. The War Department had 208 8Fs built by Beyer Peacock and North British Locomotive Company and requisitioned 51 more.

Stanier 8F production for the WD continued until 1943 when the cheaper WD Austerity 2-8-0 was introduced. Production for British domestic use continued until 1946.

== Construction ==
Construction of LMS Stanier Class 8F: general summary
Ordering organisation	Numbers	Quantity	Total
London, Midland and Scottish Railway	8000–8225	226	
London, Midland and Scottish Railway	8301–8399	99	
London, Midland and Scottish Railway	8490–8495	6	
LMS total			331
War Department	300–449	150	
War Department	500–524	25	
War Department	540–571	32	
War Department	623	1	
War Dept total			208
Railway Executive Committee	8400–8479	80	
Railway Executive Committee	8500–8559	60	
Railway Executive Committee	8600–8704	105	
REC total			245
London and North Eastern Railway	7651–7675	25	
London and North Eastern Railway	3125–3167	43	
LNER total			68
Grand total			852

Ordered by the London, Midland and Scottish Railway
Builder	Delivered	Quantity	Original Numbers
LMS Crewe Works	1935–44	137	LMS 8000–8026, 8096–8175, 8301–8330
Vulcan Foundry	1936–37	69	LMS 8027–8095
North British Locomotive Co.	1942	50	LMS 8176–8225
LMS Horwich Works	1943–45	75	LMS 8331–8399, 8490–8495
Total		331	

LMS nos. 8012–6/8–25/8/30–2/4/8–49/51/2/8/9/61/6/8/9/71/2/7–80/5–8/91/3/4 were requisitioned by the War Department in 1941 and renumbered 572–622 (not in order). These 51 locomotives were intended for service in Persia, but twelve never got there: four (former nos. 8066/8/71/87) were lost in the Irish Sea whilst being shipped in 1941 and eight more were damaged in transit, repaired and returned to LMS stock in 1943 (on loan from 1942), resuming their former LMS numbers 8024/69/78–80/5/8/93. After the war, ten were bought from the WD by British Railways in 1949, and were given BR numbers 48012/6/8/20/39/45/6/61/77/94, being their original numbers increased by 40000. One final locomotive, originally LMS 8025, was bought by BR in 1957 and renumbered 48775. Thus 299 former LMS locomotives were eventually in BR stock.

Ordered by the War Department
Builder	Delivered	Quantity	Original Numbers	Notes
North British Locomotive Co.	1940–42	158	WD 300–399, 500–524, 540–571, 623	300–337 delivered as LMS 8226–8263, on loan from WD
Beyer, Peacock & Co.	1940–42	50	WD 400–449	400–414 delivered as LMS 8286–8300, on loan from WD
Total		208		

Not all were required immediately by the War Department, and so beginning in August 1940, 53 were loaned to the LMS and given temporary LMS numbers as shown. 25 of these were subsequently transferred to the GWR, still on loan from the WD, but retained their LMS numbers. No. 407, then on loan to the GWR and running as LMS 8293, was damaged in an accident at Dolphin Junction, Slough; after repair it was bought by the LMS in 1943, retaining number 8293. The remainder were returned to the WD during 1941 and resumed their original WD numbers. Others were loaned to the LMS but initially retained their WD numbers; in 1943, 22 of these (WD 549–551, 553, 555–571 and 623) were bought by the LMS and renumbered 8264–85. In 1948–49, 29 more (original WD numbers 300/1, 311/4/8, 332, 363, 376/8, 384, 394, 321, 398, 504, 518, 544, 373, 506, 401–3, 413, 438, 440/2/3/6/7/9) were bought by British Railways and renumbered 48246–63, 48286–92, 48294–7 without regard to any LMS numbers previously carried. Two more, originally WD nos. 307 and 320, were bought by BR in 1957 and renumbered 48773/4. 54 of the 208 locomotives ordered by the WD were eventually in BR stock.

Ordered by the Railway Executive Committee
Builder	Delivered	Quantity	Original Numbers	Notes
GWR Swindon Works	1943–45	80	LMS 8400–8479	Loaned to the GWR from new
LNER Darlington Works	1944–45	30	LMS 8500–8509, 8540–8559	Loaned to the LNER from new
LNER Doncaster Works	1944–45	30	LMS 8510–8539	Loaned to the LNER from new
SR Eastleigh Works	1943–44	23	LMS 8600–8609, 8650–8662	
SR Ashford Works	1943–44	14	LMS 8610–8612, 8618–8624, 8671–8674	
SR Brighton Works	1943–44	68	LMS 8613–8617, 8625–8649, 8663–8670, 8675–8704	
Total		245		

Although none of these was built by the LMS, all were considered to be LMS property; those built by the GWR and LNER were loaned to the railways which built them, being returned to the LMS during 1946–47. All 245 entered BR stock at the start of 1948 and subsequently had their LMS numbers increased by 40000.

Ordered by the London and North Eastern Railway (Class O6)
Builder	Delivered	Quantity	Original Numbers	Notes
SR Brighton Works	1944	25	LNER 7651–7675	renumbered LNER 3100–3124, then LNER 3500–3524
LNER Darlington Works	1945–46	23	LNER 3125–3147	renumbered LNER 3525–3547
LNER Doncaster Works	1945–46	20	LNER 3148–3167	renumbered LNER 3548–3567
Total		68		

These were paid for by the LNER, which had informed the Ministry of War Transport that they were willing to buy up to 100 of these locomotives in the national interest. Once replacement locomotives became available from September 1947, they were loaned to the LMS and given LMS numbers 8705–72; by nationalisation at the start of 1948, only one (LNER no. 3554) remained, and this was loaned to what was now the London Midland Region (LMR) in January 1948, duly becoming BR (LMR) no. 8759. The loan of all 68 became a permanent transfer in May 1948 and they subsequently became BR nos. 48705–72.

== Overseas service ==
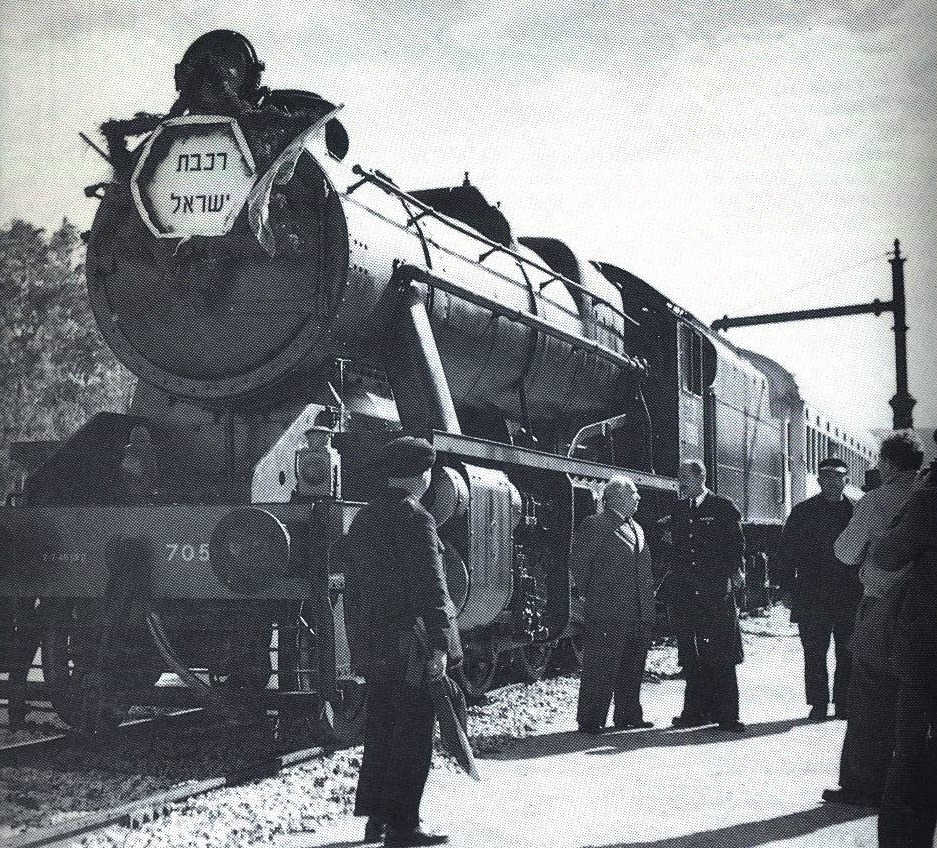
Israel Railways 8F 70513 (NBL 24721 of 1941), taking water at Zichron Ya'akov on 4 January 1949. This was one of 24 WD 8Fs sold to Palestine Railways after wartime service in Iran and Palestine.

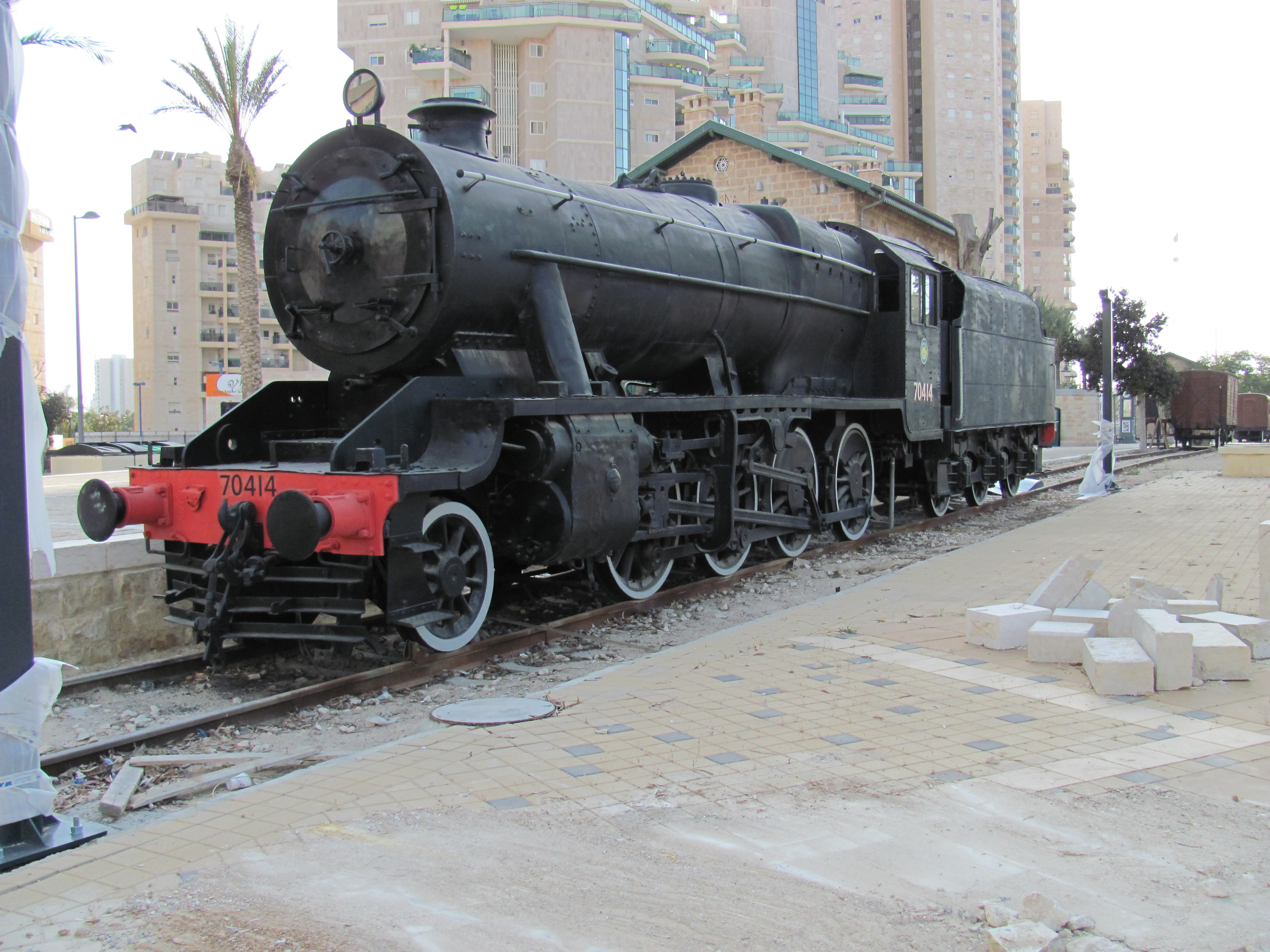
TCDD 45151 Class 45166, preserved at Beersheba in the guise of scrapped classmate Israel Railways 70414.

The War Department originally ordered 8Fs for service in support of the British Expeditionary Force, but they were not delivered until after the Fall of France. However, most of them did see wartime military service overseas in Egypt, Palestine, Iran and Italy. Many of these locomotives were later sold to the local railways in these countries, and some were also sold to Turkey and Iraq.

=== Egypt ===
Remains of a loco at the site of the wreck of SS Thistlegorm (2026)

The British Army's Middle East Forces (MEF) in Egypt received 42 8Fs in 1941-42, with some having been lost at sea en route (246-304, 322, 370, 371, 415, 416, 428, 429, 444 & 445) possibly on the SS Thistlegorm. Some of these were loaned to Egyptian State Railways (ESR) and the others were used by the MEF on the Western Desert Extension Railway (WDER). The scarcity of water made steam locomotive operations on the WDER difficult, and their smoke also attracted unwanted attention from enemy aircraft, so once American diesels began to arrive from late 1942 the use of 8Fs on the WDER declined. Forty locomotives were sold to ESR in 1942-44. The other two locomotives had accident damage, and were made into one good locomotive which was also sold to ESR in 1945. The remains of the last locomotive were bought by ESR for spares in 1946.

The MEF received another 50 8Fs from Iran in 1944, for use in both Egypt and Palestine, although 15 of these were transferred to Italy later in the year. Some of the 50 were not in operational condition, and 4 were scrapped by the MEF in 1946 without further use. Another 59 former Iranian 8Fs were transferred to the MEF in 1946, most of which were initially used in Palestine. This brought the number of 8Fs in the Middle East Forces up to 90.

After the war the British military presence in the region waned, so the need for military locomotives declined. The MEF's fleet was largely sold off in 1947-48 to British Railways (39), Palestine Railways (24) and ESR (11). Five returned to Britain for continued WD use in 1952. MEF railway operation ended in 1954, with 10 8Fs being sold to ESR, and 1 scrapped by MEF following bomb damage.

ESR thus purchased a total of 62 8Fs from MEF between 1942 and 1954, and operated the type until 1963.

=== Iran ===
Following the occupation of Iran in 1941, WD locomotives were required to operate the Persian Corridor supply route, delivering war materials to the Soviet Union via the Trans-Iranian Railway. 163 8F were dispatched to Iran in 1941-42, but only 143 arrived (12 being lost at sea (246-444, 445, 608, 617, 619, 622 (latter 4 former LMS 8066, 8068, 8071, 8087)) and 8 returned to Britain with sea damage). These operated as Iranian State Railways' Class 41.

The arrival of US Army Transportation Corps units in Iran with their own locomotives (including diesels which were more suitable for use in desert regions) made many of the 8Fs redundant, and 50 locomotives were transferred to the Middle East Forces in 1944. At the end of the war the need for steam locomotives in Iran was further reduced and another 71 locomotives left for the MEF (59) and Iraq (12) in 1945-48. The remaining 22 locomotives in Iran had all been withdrawn by 1963.

=== Iraq ===
Ten WD locomotives were transferred from Iran in 1946-47, being purchased by Iraqi State Railways in 1947, and two more locomotives were purchased from Iran in 1948. These became Iraqi Class TD, and operated until the 1970s. One example, no. 1429, was still in existence in Baghdad, in 2014.

=== Italy ===
15 former Iranian 8F were transferred to Italy by way of the MEF during 1944. After the war they were sold to Ferrovie dello Stato, where they operated as FS Class 737 until the early 1950s.

=== Palestine and Israel ===
Some MEF 8Fs were loaned to Palestine Railways during 1942, but larger numbers of former Iranian locomotives arrived in 1944, being used on the Haifa Beirut Tripoli Railway and other lines. In 1947 24 MEF 8Fs were sold to Palestine Railways. Following the 1948 Arab-Israeli War 23 of these locomotives were taken over by Israel Railways, being operated until 1958. The war stranded the other 8F, 70372 (NBL works no. 24680), on a small section of the main line near Tulkarm on the West Bank side of the 1949 Armistice line. It remained there, increasingly derelict, until after the 1967 Israeli invasion of the West Bank. The Israelis finally removed and scrapped it in about 1973.

=== Turkey ===
Twenty-five new WD locomotives were sold to Turkish State Railways (TCDD) in 1941 for diplomatic reasons, but seven of these were lost at sea en route (338, 343-345, 354-356. 343, 344 and 345 sunk when the SS Jessmore collided with Baron Pentland on 16 February 1941). Two more locomotives were delivered in 1943, making a total of 20. These served as the TCDD 45151 Class, operating until the 1980s.

== War Department use in UK ==
With their intended role in France having ceased to exist, early WD 8Fs were loaned to British railway companies in 1940-42, being given temporary numbers in the LMS series. However, by late 1941 the need for locomotives in Iran and Egypt was such that all of the WD locomotives which had been completed up to that point were recalled for military service, and 50 more locomotives were requisitioned from the LMS. Locomotive WD 407 (LMS 8293) had been damaged in an accident whilst on loan to the Great Western Railway, so a 51st LMS engine was requisitioned as a replacement.

By 1942 the need for locomotives overseas had been satisfied, and the final 24 new WD 8Fs remained in the UK on loan to LMS. Also remaining in the UK were nine damaged locomotives (WD 407 and 8 requisitioned locomotives whose voyage to Iran had been aborted after the SS Pentridge Hill suffered severe storm damage – 4 other locomotives had had to be jettisoned into the sea to save the ship). Two locomotives were sold to Turkey in 1944, and the other 31 were sold to the LMS in 1943.

In 1952 five WD 8Fs returned to the UK from the MEF in poor condition. These were refurbished for WD use at the Longmoor Military Railway (LMR). Three of these were sold to British Railways in 1957 becoming Nos. 48773-75. The other two were transferred to the Cairnryan Military Railway and were scrapped in 1959, ending the WD's use of 8F locomotives.

== Accidents and incidents ==
- On 21 January 1941, Locomotive No. 8247 of the London, Midland and Scottish Railway was derailed at Wallneuk Junction, Paisley, Renfrewshire. Three cranes were needed to recover it.
- On 2 July 1941, locomotive WD 407 (LMS 8293) was hauling a freight train which was in a head-on collision with an express passenger train, hauled by GWR 4073 Class 4-6-0 No. 4091 Dudley Castle, at Slough, Berkshire. Five people were killed and 21 were injured. Despite suffering a buckled main frame, fractured pony truck, and crushed cab, the locomotive – on loan to the Great Western Railway from the War Department – was repaired at the GWR's Swindon Works and returned to the LMS in October 1941.
- On 8 May 1954, locomotive No. 48462 of British Railways was hauling a freight train that became divided and was derailed at Plumpton, Cumberland.
- On 9 February 1957, locomotive No 48188 was hauling a freight train that ran away due to the failure of the steam brake pipe in the cab. It collided with a preceding freight train and a diesel multiple unit at Chapel-en-le-Frith station, Derbyshire. Staff there had enough warning to be able to evacuate the passenger train before the collision. Driver John Axon had remained with the runaway freight and was killed, as was guard Creamer of the preceding freight train. Axon was awarded a posthumous George Cross.
- In 1959, locomotive No. 48193 ran into the turntable pit at Kirkby in Ashfield, Nottinghamshire.
- On 17 June 1960, locomotive No. 48616 collided with some empty coaches and eventually derailed and rolled down an embankment. Nobody was hurt and the locomotive was withdrawn and scrapped a few days later.
- On 12 November 1961, locomotive No. 48674 was derailed by catch points between Four Oaks and Sutton Coldfield.
- On 16 December 1962, locomotive No. 48263 was derailed by trap points at Spon End, Warwickshire.
- On 14 August 1964, locomotive No. 48734 collided with a train of oil tankers at Didcot, Oxfordshire. Eleven tankers were derailed and caught fire, severely damaging the locomotive. It was declared a write-off and was scrapped at Crewe Works in November 1964.

== British civilian use ==
=== 'The Big Four' railways ===
Some 331 locomotives were built for the London Midland and Scottish Railway between 1935-45. A further 245 were built by the London and North Eastern Railway, Great Western Railway and Southern Railway in 1943-45 for LMS stock, though mostly retained on loan by the other railways during the war. The LNER also purchased 68 Stanier 8Fs for its own use in 1944-46, classifying them O6, though these were also sold to the LMS after the war. As noted above, 51 LMS locomotives were requisitioned by the WD in 1941, but 31 WD locomotives were subsequently purchased by the LMS in 1943 (including 8 of the requisitioned engines).

=== British Railways ===
As a result, 624 8Fs passed into British Railways ownership when Britain's railways were nationalised in 1948. A further 39 (10 requisitioned) were purchased from MEF stock in 1948, and a final 3 (1 requisitioned) from the Longmoor Military Railway in 1957, bringing the total to 666. The 8Fs were concentrated on the London Midland Region, but were also allocated to former LMS sheds on other regions. Despite some having operated in Scotland by the LMS, they were not common on the Scottish Region under BR ownership as the later WD 'Austerity' 2-8-0 and 2-10-0 types were used instead.

=== Withdrawal ===
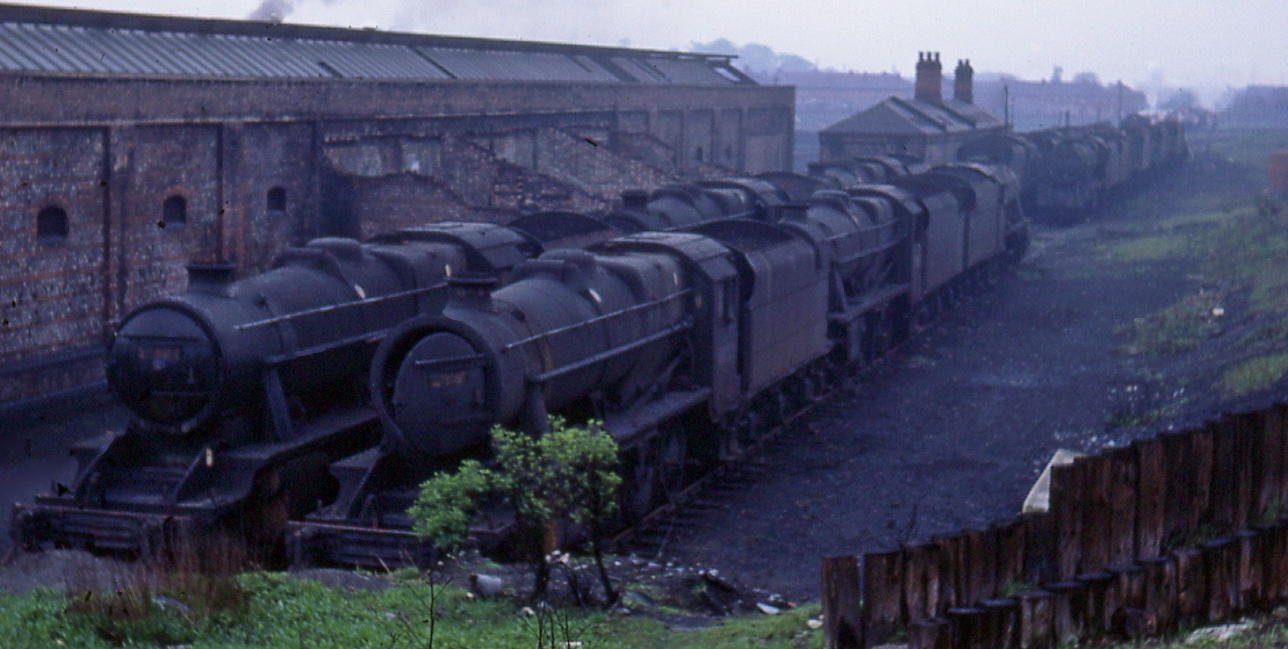
End of the line: withdrawn 8Fs in spring 1968 at Newton Heath, Manchester awaiting scrapping

The 8Fs were successful and durable locomotives in BR service, with all 666 locomotives surviving until 1960 and routine withdrawals not beginning until 1964. The first to go in 1960 was 48616, followed two years later by 48009. 48773–48775 (the former Longmoor Military Railway locomotives which were the only 8Fs on the Scottish Region) were also withdrawn in 1962, but these were reinstated into London Midland Region stock in 1963. The remaining 664 were withdrawn between 1964 and 1968, with 150 surviving to the last year of steam on BR.

During the late 1960s, no. 48773 had diagonal yellow stripes painted on the cabsides to indicate that it could not run south of Crewe due to it being out of gauge for the new 25 kV AC overhead electrification.

Year	Quantity in service at start of year	Quantity withdrawn	Locomotive number(s)
1960	666	1	48616
1961	665	0	–
1962	665	4	48009/773–775
1963	661	-3	(48773–775 reinstated)
1964	664	26	48008/69; 48140/44/50/72/79; 48209–10/16; 48306/41/96; 48420/31/55/63; 48508/24; 48611/42/54/57; 48734/72
1965	638	95	48001/04/06–07/16/20/27/37/39/78/94–97/99; 48102/112/116/135/138/145/148/156/173/183–184/189/198; 48217/259–60/262/273/285/290/295/297; 48312/314/328/330/333/355/360/366/378/387/389/391; 48401/403/406/409/416/427/429–30/446/461/478/490; 48500/518/525/558; 48601/607/610/624/630/634/649/653/656/658/660–61/682/688–89; 48704/716/719/732–33/737/759/761/769/771/774
1966	543	162	48002-03/05/50/64-65/79-80/83/88-89/92, 48101/03/09/18/20/27/29/33-34/37/39/42-43/47/55/75/78/81/86/88/95-96, 48203/07/13/15/19/23/25/46/48-51/54-55/63-64/70/74/77/80/84/86/89/91/96, 48302-03/09/11/18/26/31/39/42/46/49/53-54/57-58/61/67/70/72/83/85/88/97-98, 48404-05/12/14-15/18/22/26/28/32/34/43-44/47/52/57/62/72/75/77/79, 48502/11-12/14-16/20-21/23/26-27/30/39/41/43/54-55, 48600/05-06/08/15/19/21/23/25/27-29/33/35/38/41/44/47/51/59/62-63/67-68/70/72/79-80/86/91/94/98, 48706/13/18/26/36/38/47-48/55/60/62
1967	381	231	48000/11/17-18/24/35/53-55/57/61/67/70/73-76/82/84-85/93/98, 48100/04-06/08/10/13-14/19/21-23/25-26/28/30-31/36/41/46/49/52/54/57-66/69/71/74/76-77/80/85/87/90/94/99, 48202/04-05/08/11/14/18/20-22/56/58/61/65-66/68-69/71/75-76/79/81/83/87-88, 48301/10/13/15-16/20/24/32/36-37/43/47/50/52/59/62-64/71/75-77/79/81-82/86/94-95/99, 48402/08/11/17/25/35-36/38-40/49-50/54/56/58-60/64/66/69-70/73-74/94-95, 48501/05-06/09/13/17/22/28/31/34-38/40/42/45/47-48/50/52/56-57, 48602-04/13/18/22/36-37/40/43/45/48/50/55/64/69/71/73-76/81/85/90/93/95-97/99, 48701/03/05/07-12/14/17/21/24-25/28-29/31/35/39/41-43/51/53-54/56-58/64/66-68/70
1968	150	150	48010/12/26/33/36/45–46/56/60/62–63/77/81/90; 48107/11/15/17/24/32/51/53/67–68/70/82/91–93/97; 48200–01/06/12/24/47/52–53/57/67/72/78/82/92/94; 48304–05/07–08/17/19/21–23/25/27/29/34–35/38/40/44–45/48/51/56/65/68–69/73–74/80/84/90/92–93; 48400/10/21/23–24/33/37/41–42/45/48/51/53/65/67–68/71/76/91–93; 48503–04/07/10/29/32–33/44/46/49/51/53/59; 48609/12/14/17/20/26/31–32/39/46/52/65–66/77–78/83–84/87/92; 48700/02/15/20/22–23/27/30/40/44–46/49–50/52/63/65/73/75

== Preservation ==
Fourteen 8Fs are known to have survived with six LMS/BR locomotives being preserved in the UK; a seventh was used a spares donor for other preserved 8Fs as well as a number of new build projects. None of the pre-war 8Fs survived into preservation. Of the six LMS/BR locomotives that exist, only 48773 was purchased directly from BR for preservation following withdrawal from Rose Grove in July 1968; the remaining five - including 48518 which would later be used as a donor engine - were all rescued from Barry Scrapyard. Three members of the class have over the years been repatriated to the UK from Turkey, with one later sent to a museum in Israel. Two of the Turkish based 8Fs which were to be repatriated to the UK, nos 45166 & 45170 made an appearance on the Channel 5 TV programme Monster Moves, this episode showed the two engines being moved 850 miles by rail across Turkey from Sivas to İzmir. 45166 would later end up in Israel as a static exhibit while 45170 is presently under restoration at Bo'ness. In addition, two Turkish Railway (TCDD) locomotives have been preserved in Turkey, and some more remain there in a derelict state. One locomotive has even survived in Iraq. The complete list is shown below. Two more are also visible underwater on the wreck of the SS Thistlegorm.

Of the fourteen engines known to have survived into preservation, all the British located examples except 48173 & 45170 “Sir William McAlpine” have run in preservation (both are undergoing restoration). Two of the British-based engines have even seen main line operation: Nos. 48151 and 48773. These have been regular main line performers in recent years with 48773 being withdrawn from operation in 2000. As of 2026, 48151 is operational on the main line.

Some of the preserved examples have stars on their cabsides indicating that they have specially balanced wheelsets/motion. This practice began under the auspices of British Railways, to denote that locomotives thus treated were able to work fast, vacuum-braked goods services. Other members of the class have a yellow stripe on the cab meaning that they were not permitted to run south of Crewe as the WCML south of Crewe had been electrified with overhead wires. Another difference between the British engines and the locos that were exported from Britain is the position of the driver's controls. The British based engines like all LMS engines were left hand drive, the locos exported to Turkey and other countries were right-hand drive.

Loco numbers in bold mean their current number.

Number				Manufacturer	Built	Withdrawn	Balanced Motion	LH Drive	Location	Status	Notes
LMS	BR	WD	TCDD	Manufacturer	Built	Withdrawn	Balanced Motion	LH Drive	Location	Status	Notes
8151	**48151**	—	—	Crewe Works	Sept 1942	Jan 1968	Yes	Yes	West Coast Railway Company (Carnforth)	Operational, Mainline Certified.	In November 1995 it was loaned to Tunstead Quarry to haul a 975-ton train of hopper wagons for a special train out of Tunstead, it also on 19 December 2000 worked a special one off freight train along the Settle and Carlisle line from Hellifield to Ribblehead Quarry where the hopper wagons were loaded and it then worked the loaded train on from Ribblehead Quarry to Carlisle. Undertook first post overhaul test-run on 16 June 2026.
8173	48173	—	—	Crewe Works	Jun 1943	Jul 1965	Yes	Yes	Churnet Valley Railway	Under restoration as of 2026.	Restoration started in 2018.
8233	**48773**	307	—	North British Locomotive Co.	Jun 1940	Aug 1968	Yes	Yes	Severn Valley Railway	Static Display	Built as WD 307 and loaned to LMS as 8233. To Iran as 41.109, then War Department (MEF) 70307, WD (Longmoor Military Railway) 500 and BR 48773. It last steamed in 2008 and is on display in the Engine House as of 2026.
8305	**48305**	—	—	Crewe Works	Nov 1943	Jan 1968	Yes	Yes	Great Central Railway	Operational	Built at Crewe Works, 48305 spent much of its career operating across the Midlands. It was withdrawn in 1968, just before the end of steam. During the time spent at Barry scrapyard it was sprayed with the words "Please don't let me die!" on the smokebox door, but was saved by Roger Hibbert in 1985 and was restored back to steam in the next 10 years. In 2011, half way through its boiler ticket the decision was taken to perform another overhaul, which was completed in 2019. It was withdrawn from service in 2025 due to a cracked firebox.
8431	**48431**	—	—	Swindon Works	Mar 1944	May 1964	No	Yes	Keighley and Worth Valley Railway	Static Display	Only surviving Swindon-built example. As of 2026 it is on display at Oxenhope, having last operated in 2000.
8624	**48624**	—	—	Ashford Works	Dec 1943	Jul 1965	Yes	Yes	Great Central Railway	Under overhaul as of 2026.	Only surviving Southern-built example. Restored to working order in 2009 by Peak Rail in fictional LMS Crimson Lake livery as 8624, now based at the Great Central Railway as British Railways 48624 in black. Boiler certificate expired in July 2019.
—	—	357	**45153**	North British Locomotive Co.	1941	1986	No	No	Turkey	Static display	On display at TCDD open air museum at Devlet Bahçeli Parkı, Çankırı as of 2025.
**8274**	48274	348	45160	North British Locomotive Co.	Jun 1942	1986	No	No	Private site, Malvern	Stored as of 2026.	Exported as a kit of parts to Turkey in 1940, returned to UK in 1989 and restored to operational condition. This engine has variously run as TCDD 45160, LMS 8476 and British Railways 48274.
—	—	522	**45161**	North British Locomotive Co.	1941	1986	No	No	Turkey	Static Display	On display in Çamlık Railway Museum as of 2026.
8279	-	353	**45165**	North British Locomotive Co.	1940	1986	No	No	Turkey	Static display	Cosmetically restored and displayed outside Sincan railway station, Ankara in Jan 2013.
8267	—	341	45166	North British Locomotive Co.	1940	1986	No	No	Be'er Sheva Turkish Railway Station	Static Display	Repatriated from Turkey in 2010 by the Churchill 8F Company, then sold to the Municipality of Beersheba, Israel in 2012. Displayed at the former Be'er Sheva Turkish Railway Station as Israel Railways No. 70414.
8266	—	340	**45168**	North British Locomotive Co.	1940	1986	No	No	Turkey	Stored	Displayed outside Izmit station until 2016 when it moved to storage at Seka paper mill museum (Seka Kagit Müzesi) in Izmit.
—	—	554	**45170**	North British Locomotive Co.	1942	1986	No	No	Bo'ness and Kinneil Railway	Under restoration.	Repatriated from Turkey in 2010. As of 2026 it was under restoration.
8188	—	**547**	—	North British Locomotive Co.	1942		No	No	Iraqi Republic Railways (IRR), Baghdad	Stored	Built as WD 547, then to Iran as 41.222, WD (Iraq) 70547, to ISR as 909 then 1429. Currently in storage pending formal preservation, formerly dumped near a railway yard in Baghdad minus tender. 33°20′43.20″N 44°21′13.90″E

No 48518, formerly LMS 8518, built in 1944, was the only surviving LNER-built example. Formerly part of the 'Barry Ten', 48518 was used as a parts donor for 1014 County of Glamorgan and 45551 The Unknown Warrior. It was consequently dismantled and the frames were scrapped at Bury in mid-2013.

== Gallery ==
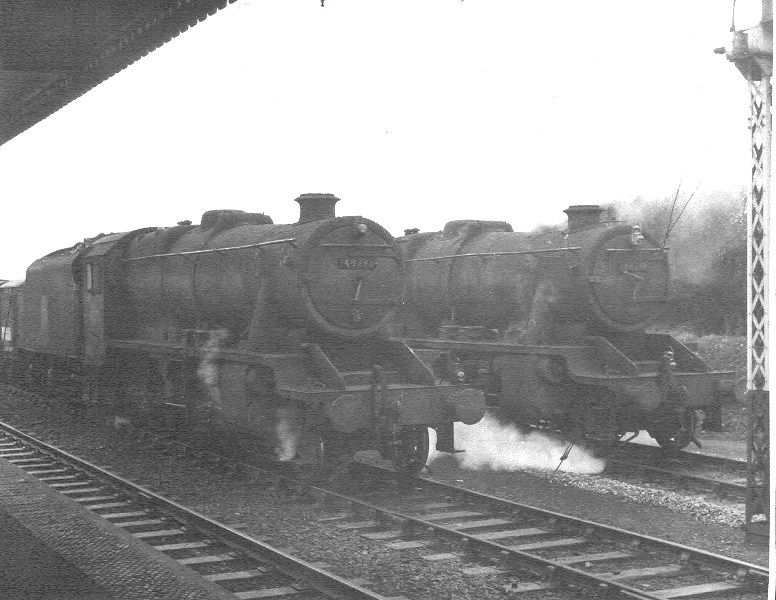
48392 and 48216 at Water Orton

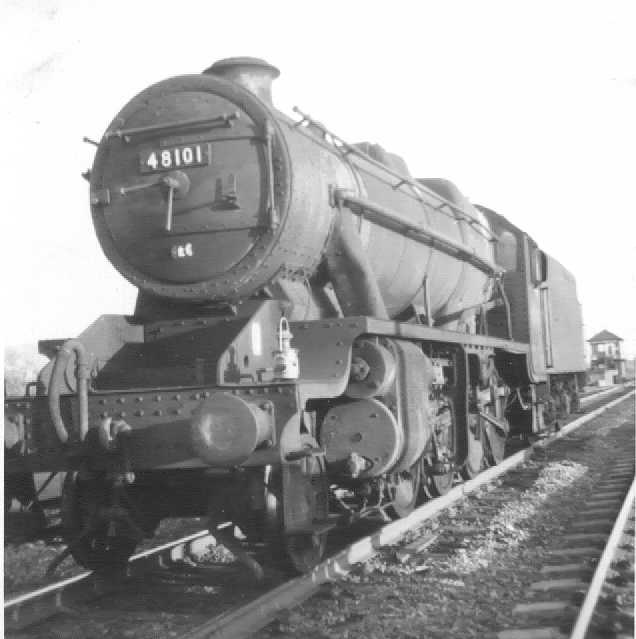
48101

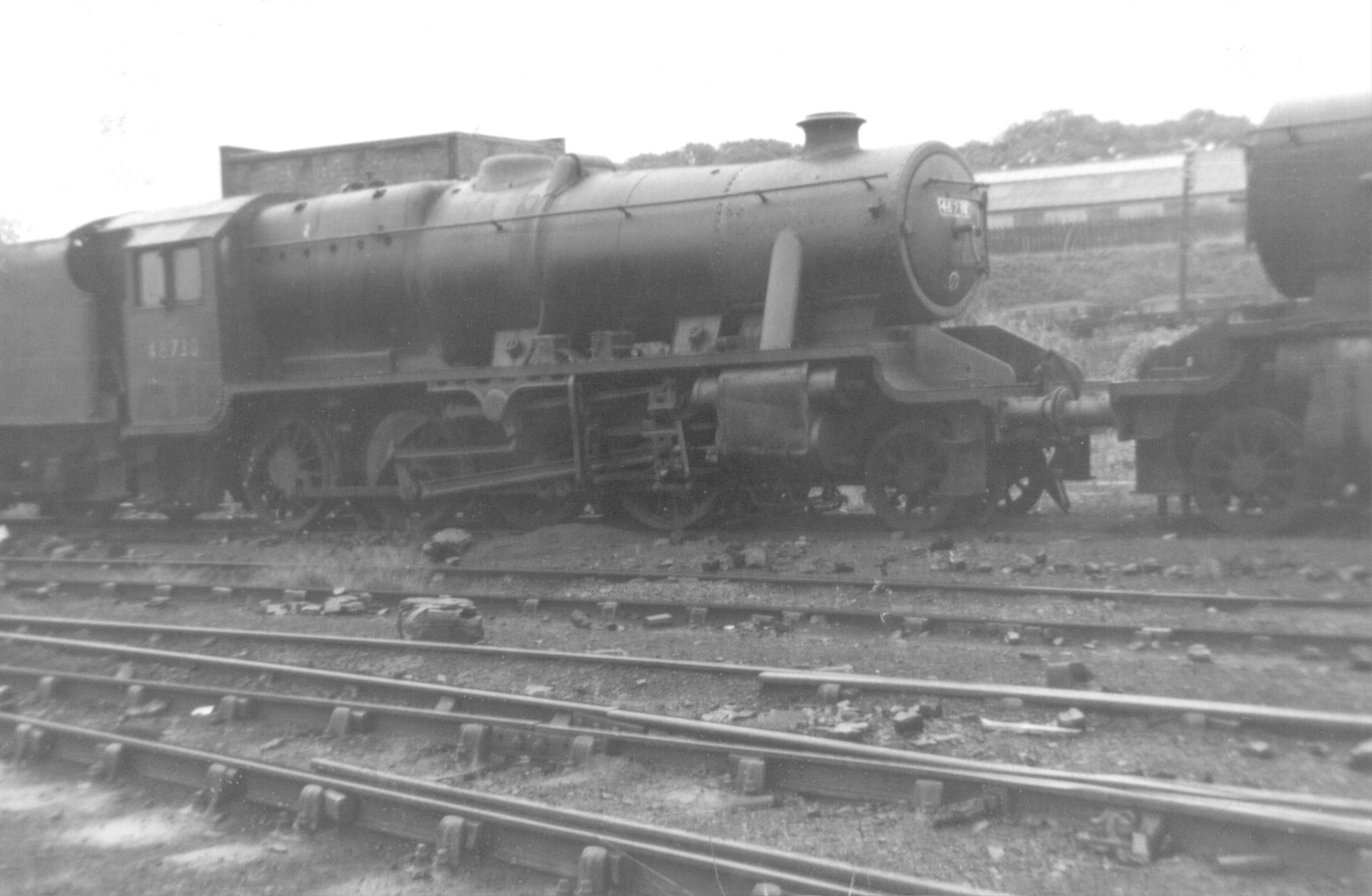
48730 at Lostock Hall MPD in 1968

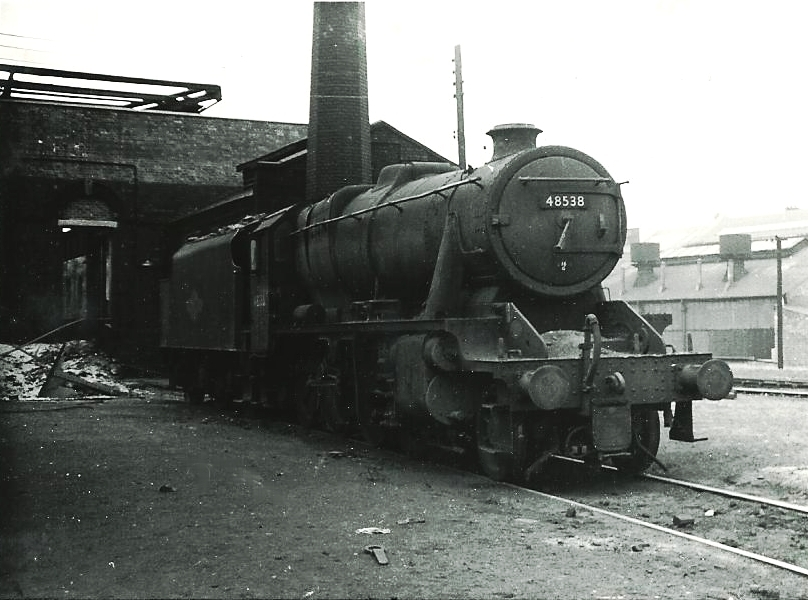
48538 sat outside Saltley Shed during the running down of steam in 1967

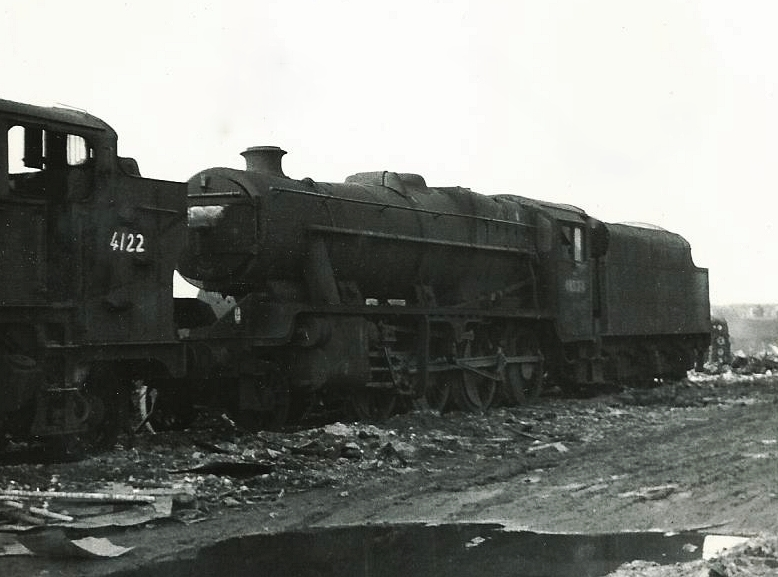
48324 sat at Birds scrapyard awaiting its fate

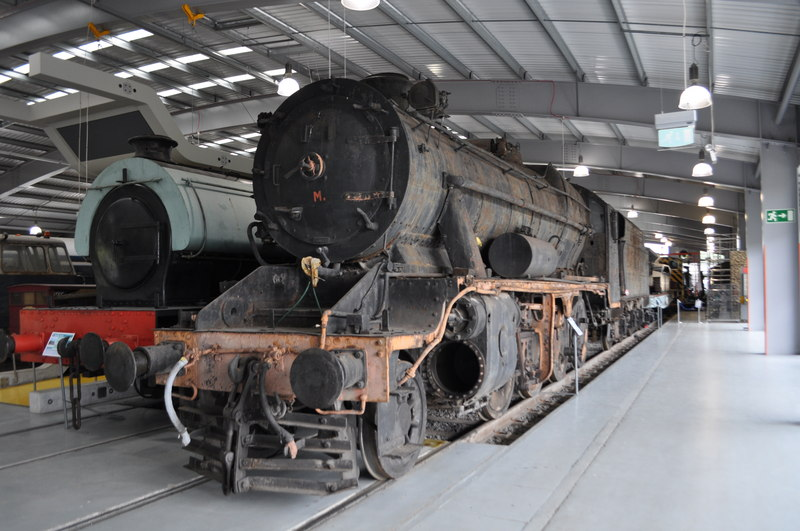
A recently repatriated 8F from Turkey, 2011

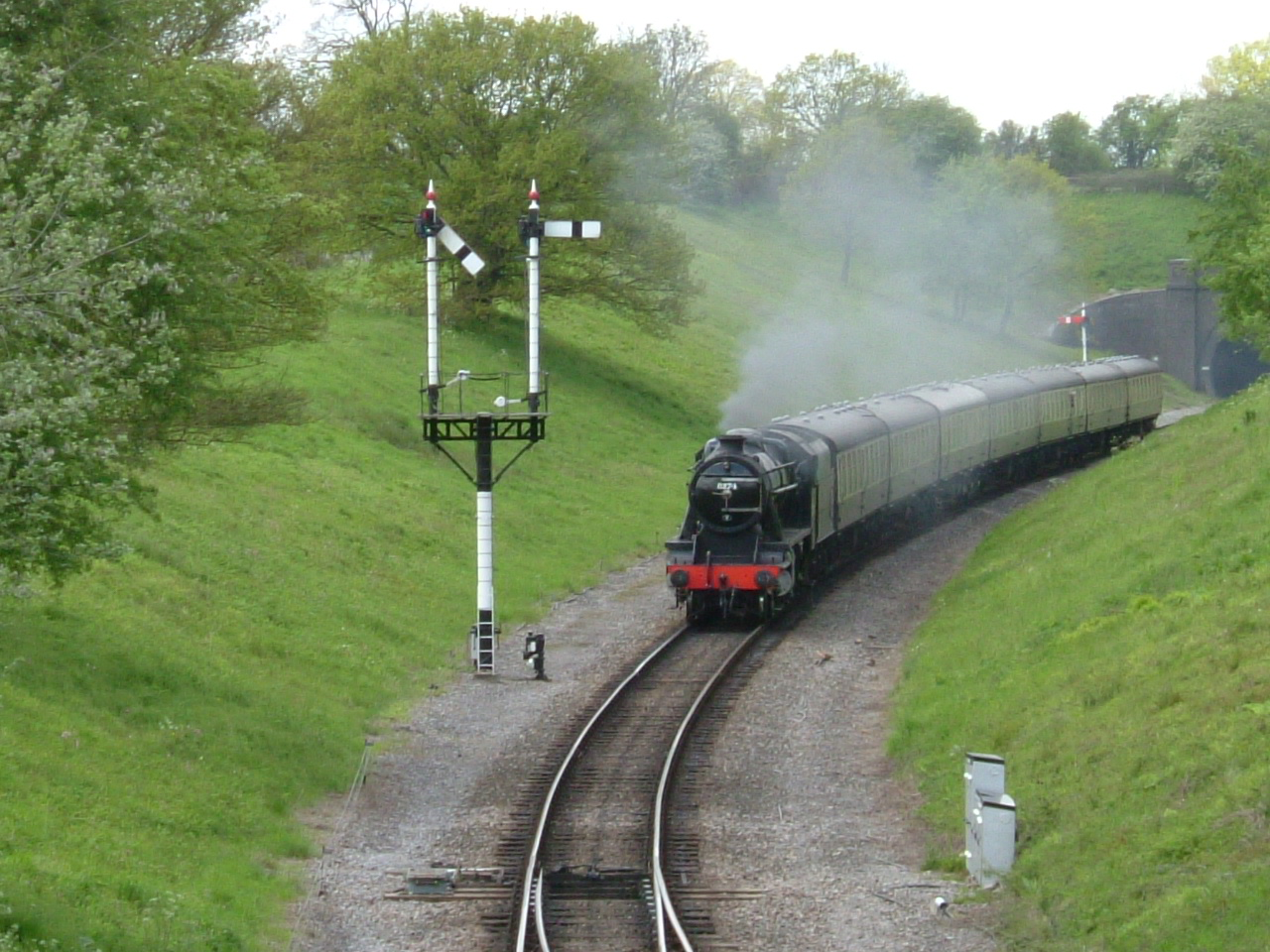
Preserved 8274 on the Gloucestershire and Warwickshire Railway

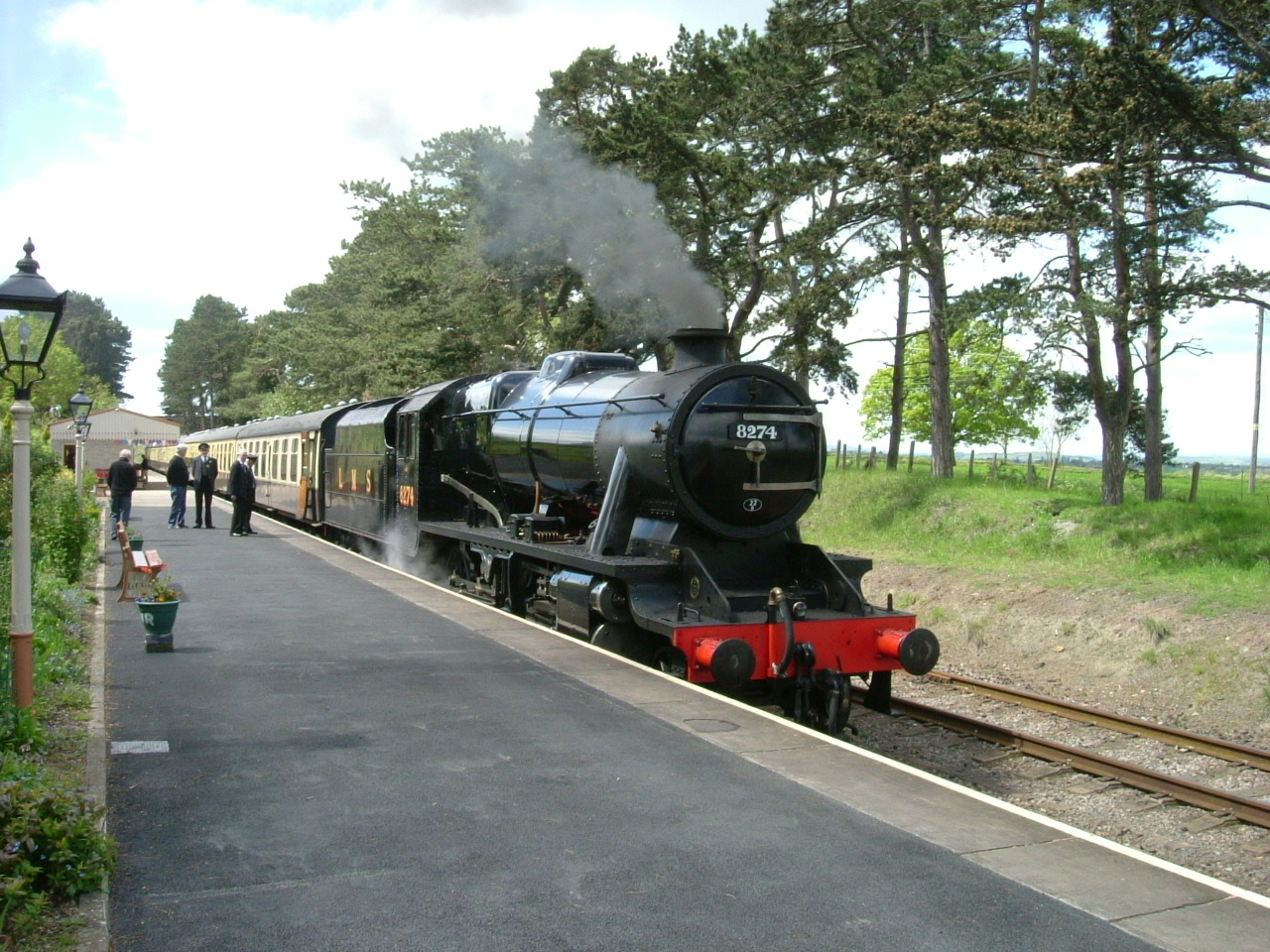
Preserved 8274

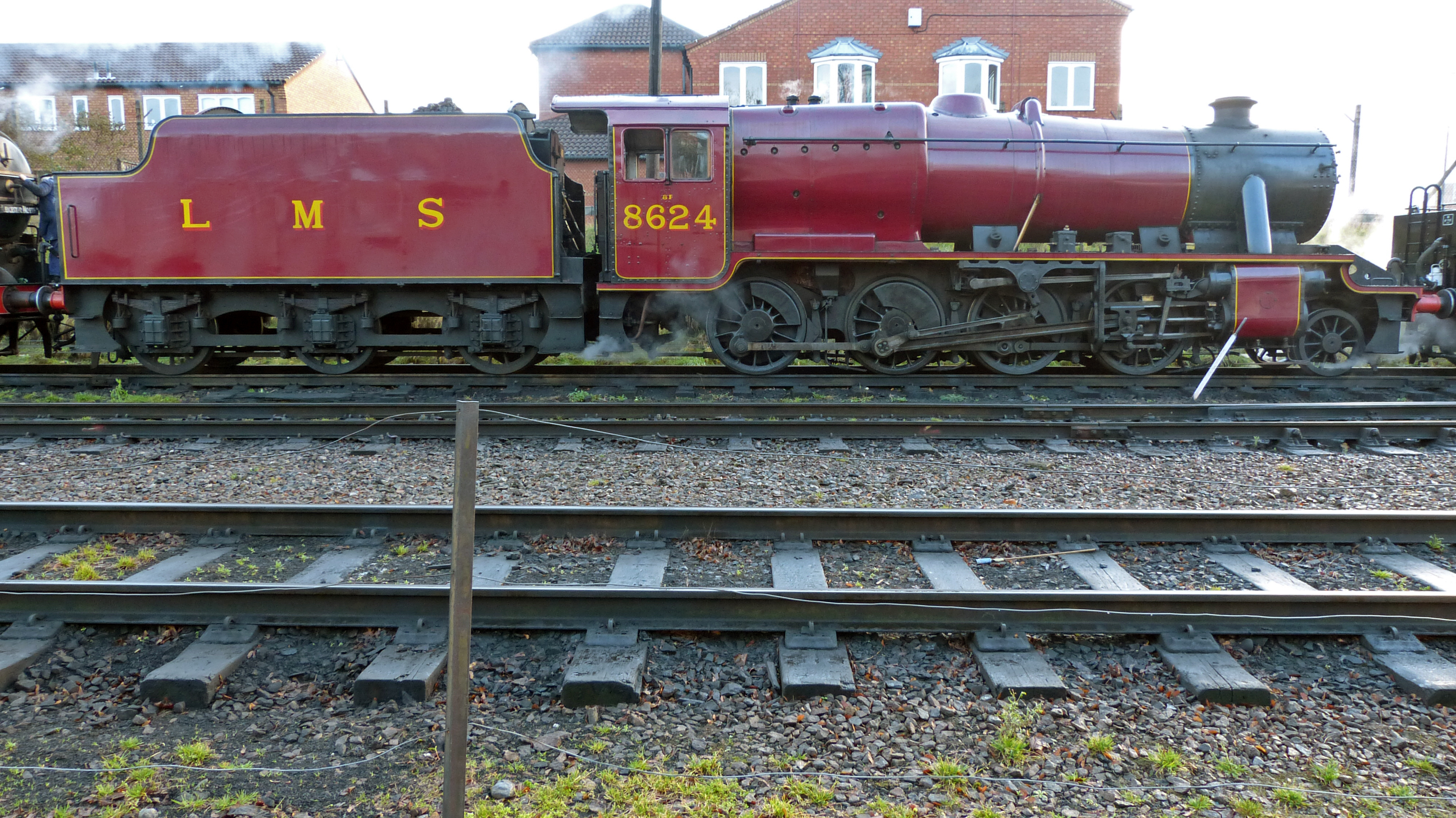
Preserved 8624 on the Great Central Railway

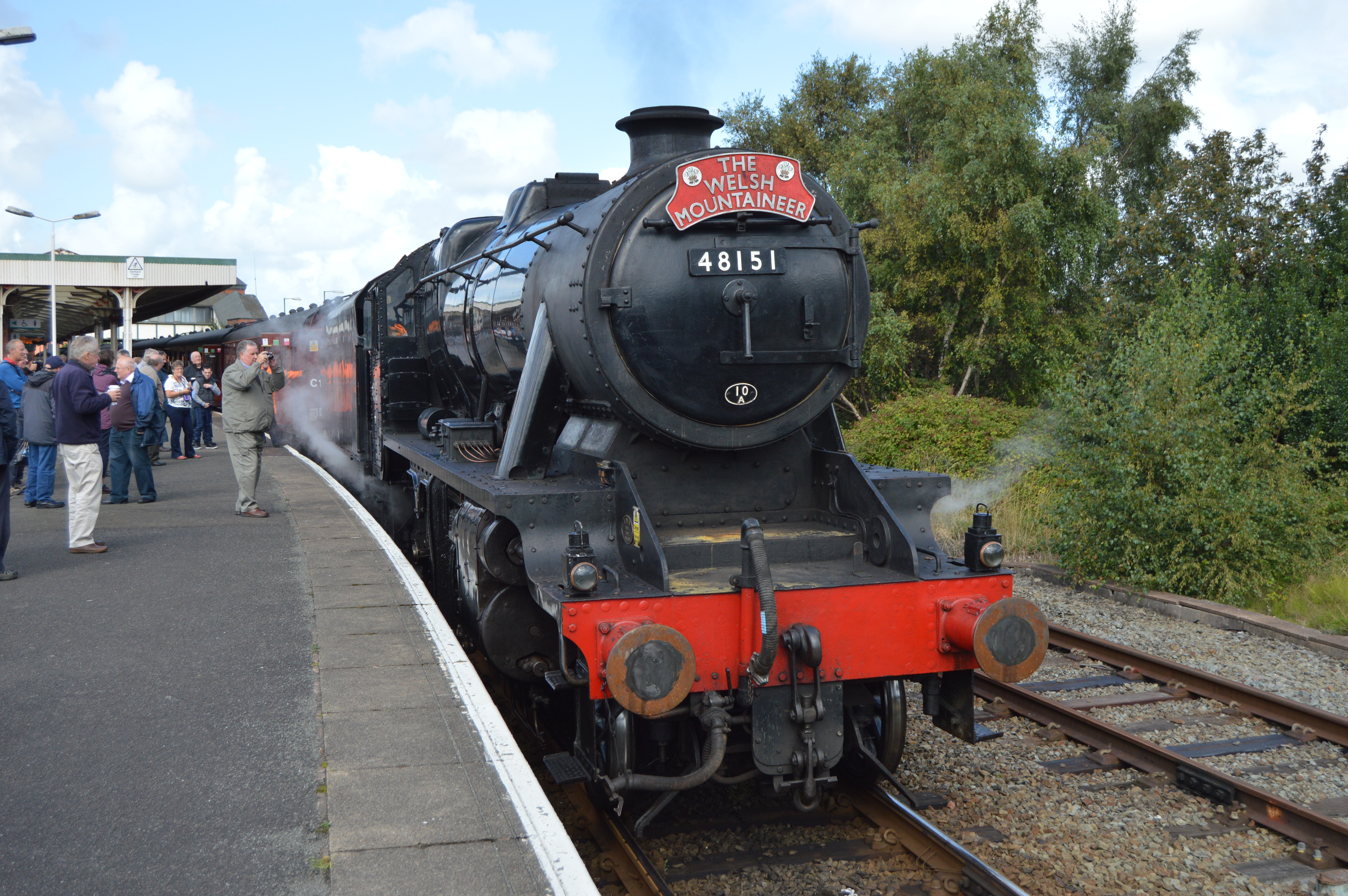
48151 at Llandudno Junction with The Welsh Mountaineer in 2014

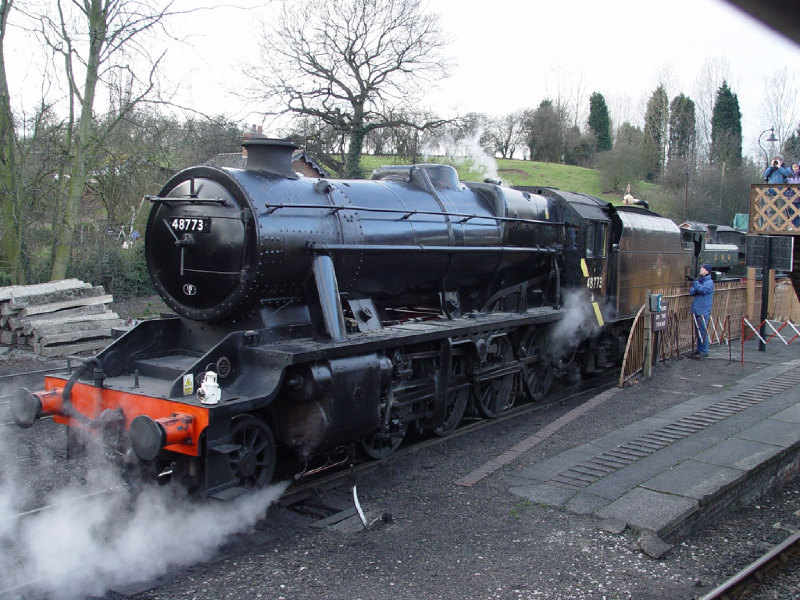
48773 at Bridgnorth shed on the Severn Valley Railway

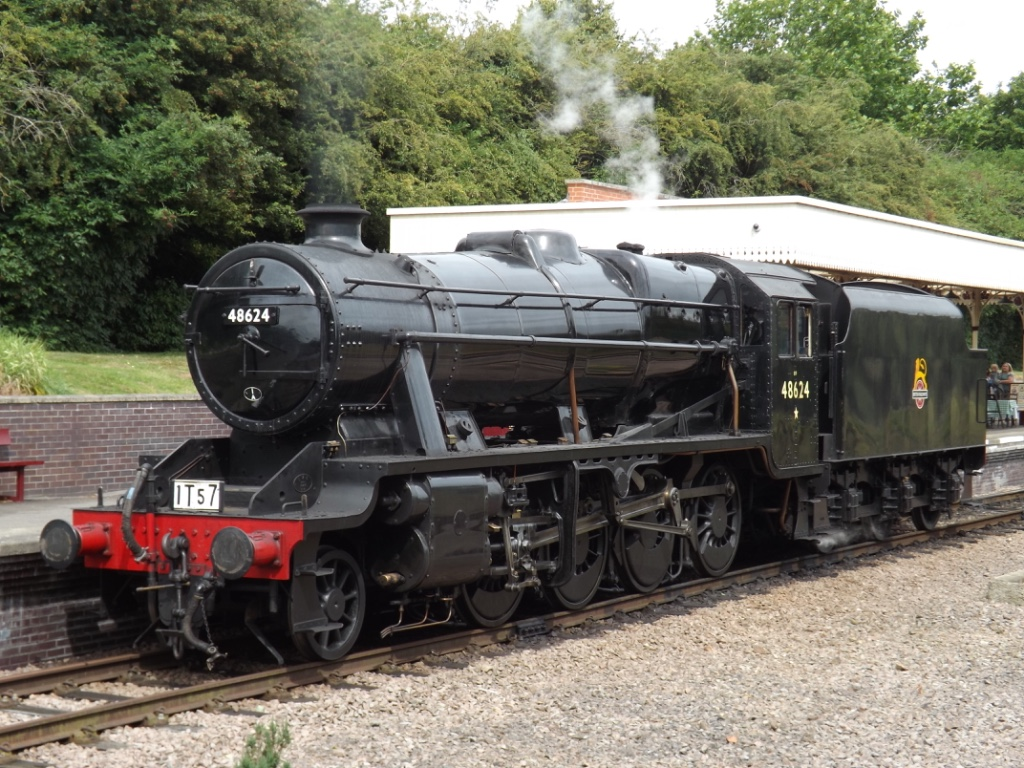
48624 running around its train at Leicester North on the Great Central Railway

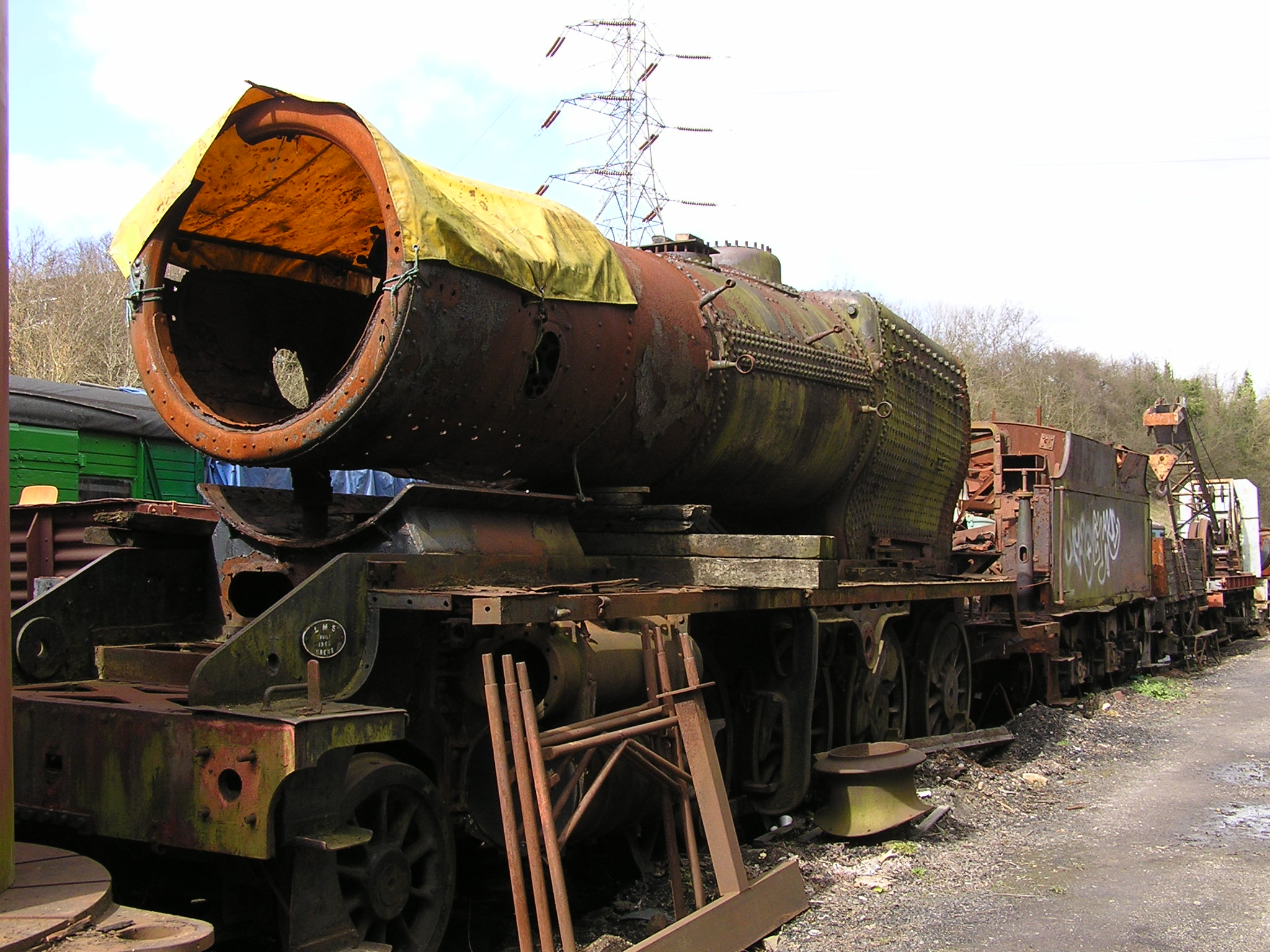
48173 awaiting restoration at Bitton on the Avon Valley Railway

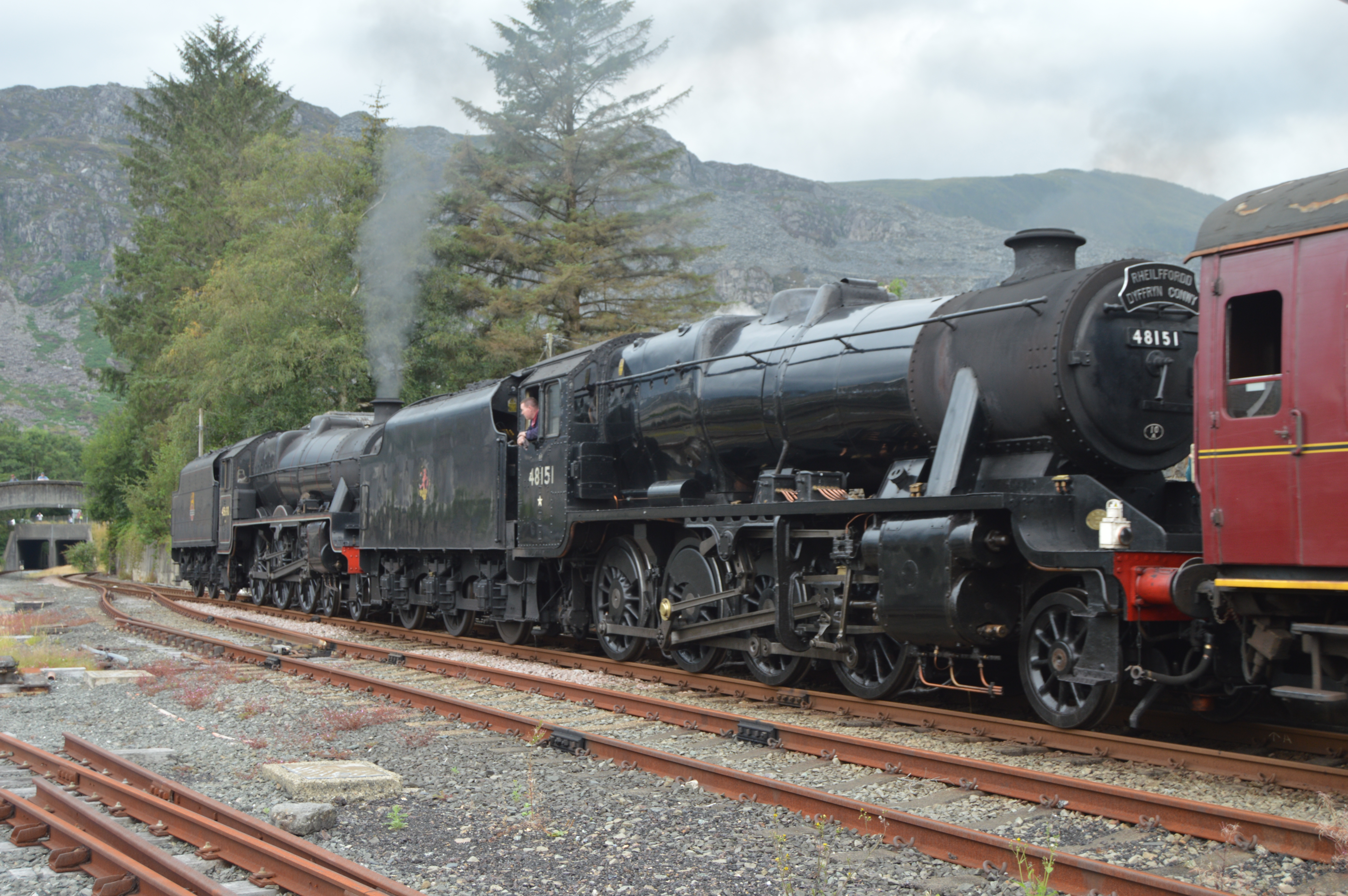
48151 & 45690 Leander shunting empty coaches at Blaenau Ffestiniog in Aug 2019.

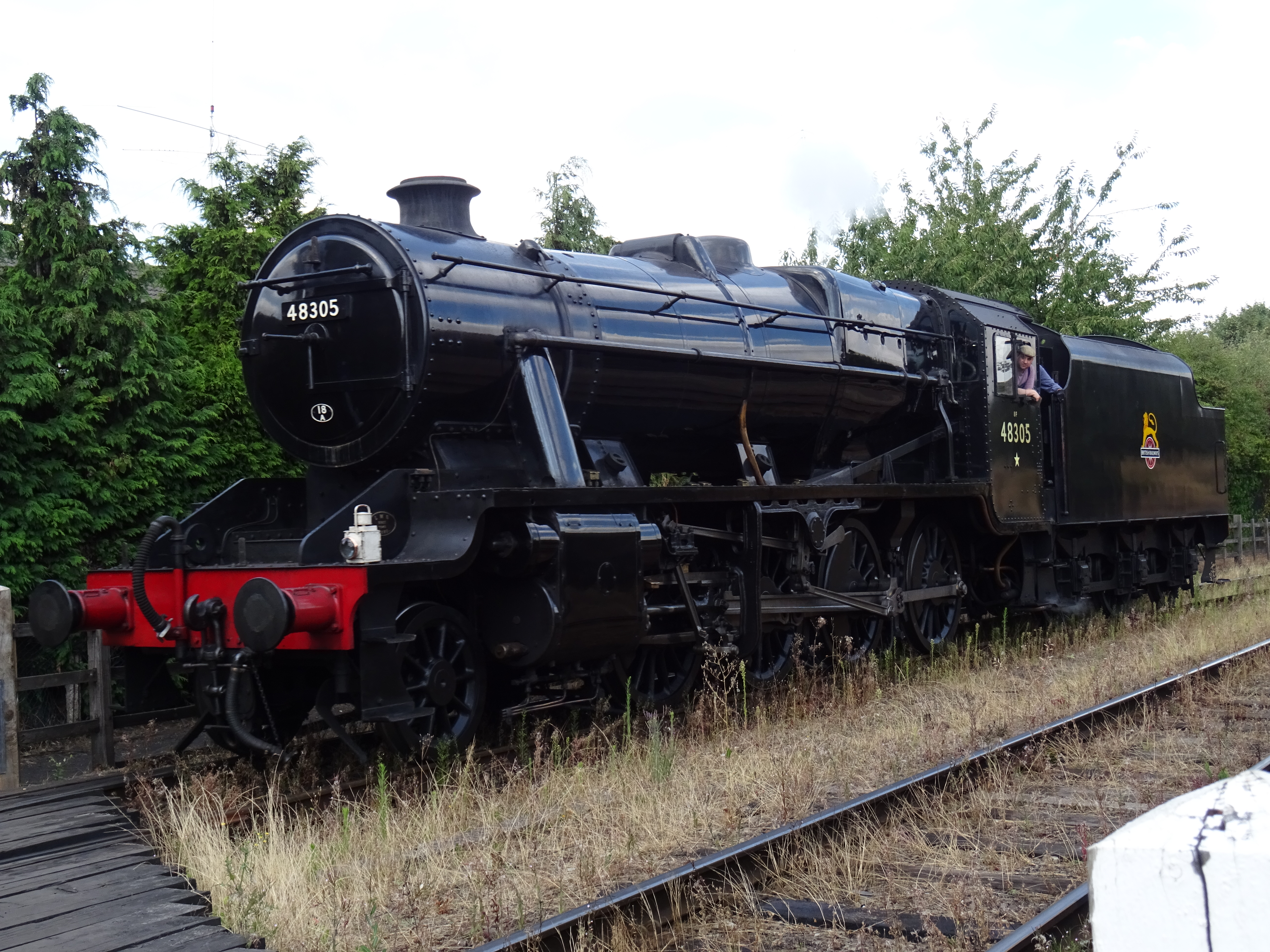
48305 running round its train at Loughborough on the GCR, 9 August 2022

== See also ==
- SS Thistlegorm

== Bibliography ==
- Boddy, M.G.; Brown, W.A.; Neve, E.; Yeadon, W.B. (November 1983). Fry, E.V. (ed.). Locomotives of the L.N.E.R., part 6B: Tender Engines - Classes O1 to P2. Kenilworth: RCTS. ISBN 0-901115-54-1.
- Cook, A.F. (1990). Greenwood, William (ed.). LMS Locomotive Design and Construction. Lincoln: RCTS. ISBN 0-901115-71-1.
- Cotterell, Paul (1984). The Railways of Palestine and Israel. Tourret Publishing. ISBN 0-905878-04-3.
- Haresnape, Brian (May 1981) [1970]. Stanier Locomotives: A Pictorial History. Shepperton: Ian Allan. p. 62. ISBN 0-7110-1098-6. EX/0581.
- Hudson, Mike; Atkins, Philip (September 2007). "Locos lost at sea. The all-time definitive record". The Railway Magazine. Vol. 153, no. 1277. IPC Media Ltd. pp. 14–19. ISSN 0033-8923.
- Hughes, Hugh (1981). Middle East Railways. Continental Railway Circle. ISBN 0-9503469-7-7.
- Hunt, David; Jennison, John; James, Fred; Essery, R.J. (2005). LMS Locomotive Profiles, no. 8 - The Class 8F 2-8-0s. Didcot: Wild Swan. ISBN 1-905184-08-5.
- Rowledge, J.W.P. (1975). Engines of the LMS built 1923–51. Oxford: Oxford Publishing Company. ISBN 0-902888-59-5.
- Tourret, R. (1995). Allied Military Locomotives of the Second World War. Abingdon, Oxon: Tourret Publishing. ISBN 0-905878-06-X.
