= Barry Ten =

Collection of steam locomotives

The Barry 10 was a collection of unsold scrapyard steam locomotives that were removed from Woodham Brothers in 1990 when Dai Woodham retired.

They were then taken on by the Vale of Glamorgan Council. For the next 20 years, the locomotives were stored in scrapyard condition, although several were bought. All the remaining locomotives were rusting hulks, stored, and not publicly viewable.

== Ownership ==
The Barry Ten were under the management and ownership of Cambrian Transport, who publicly announced, on 4 May 2010, various plans for the different engines (see below).

== Locomotive list ==
Maker	Class	Wheel arrangement	Number (and name)	Current owner	Image	Current status & Notes	ref
GWR	2800 Class	2-8-0	No. 2861	Great Western Society (GWS)		Disassembled; cylinder block and some parts used for the No. 4709 Night Owl recreation project; frames scrapped in 2014;	
GWR	5101 Class	2-6-2T	No. 4115	GWS		Disassembled; frame extensions and wheels used in the No. 4709 Night Owl recreation project; boiler used in the restoration of 5600 Class No. 6634; frames scrapped in 2016.	
GWR	5205 Class	2-8-0T	No. 5227	GWS		Some parts used for various recreation projects, including the No. 4709 Night Owl recreation project; most of the engine to be displayed at the Didcot Railway Centre in un-restored condition	
GWR	4575 Class	2-6-2T	No. 5538			Strictly speaking, not a member of the 'Barry 10'; it was given to the town of Barry by Dai Woodham, and lumped in with the Barry 10 later. Under restoration at the Dean Forest Railway.	
GWR	4575 Class	2-6-2T	No. 5539			Under restoration at the Llangollen Railway.	
GWR	5600 Class	0-6-2T	No. 6686			In storage; was to be restored for use on the now defunct Barry Tourist Railway, believed to be currently waiting restoration at Nl Engineering LTD	
GWR	Modified Hall Class	4-6-0	No. 7927 (Willington Hall)			Disassembled in 2007; frames and wheels used in the No. 1014 County of Glamorgan recreation project; boiler used in the No. 6880 Betton Grange recreation project.	
LMS	'Black Five'	4-6-0	No. 44901			Stored at the Berkeley Vale Railway; pending restoration.	
LMS	Class 8F	2-8-0	No. 48518			Disassembled; boiler used in the No. 1014 County of Glamorgan recreation project; other parts used in various restorations, including the No. 45551 Unknown Warrior recreation project; Frames scrapped in 2013.	
BR	Class 4MT	2-6-4T	No. 80150	Mid Hants Railway.		Due to be restored.	
BR	Class 9F	2-10-0	No. 92245			In storage; due to be displayed at the Barry Rail Centre as an example of an un-restored ex-Barry scrapyard engine.	
