= Indian locomotive class WDM-6 =

Type and origin
- Power type: Diesel
- Builder: BLW
- Build date: 1981–1982
- Total produced: 2 units
Specifications
- Configuration
  - UIC: Bo′Bo′
  - Commonwealth: Bo-Bo
- Gauge: 5 ft 6 in (1,676 mm)
- Bogies: Fabricated design, similar to those seen on the WDP-1
- Wheel diameter: 1,092 mm (42.99 in)
- Length: 19.60 m (64 ft 3 5/8 in)
- Width: 3,130 mm (10 ft 3 1/4 in)
- Height: 3,635 mm (11 ft 11 1/8 in)
- Axle load: 12,000 kg (26,000 lb)
- Loco weight: 70,000 kg (150,000 lb)
- Fuel type: Diesel
- Fuel capacity: 3,000 L (660 imp gal; 790 US gal)
- Lubricant cap.: 530 L (120 imp gal; 140 US gal), 630 L (140 imp gal; 170 US gal) DLW
- Water cap.: 22 L (4.8 imp gal; 5.8 US gal), 28 L (6.2 imp gal; 7.4 US gal) DLW
- Prime mover: ALCO 251-D
- RPM range: 400-1100
- Engine type: Inline-6 diesel
- Aspiration: Turbo-supercharged
- Generator: DC
- Traction motors: 6 DC
- Cylinders: 6
- Cylinder size: 228 mm × 267 mm (8.98 in × 10.51 in) bore x stroke
- Transmission: Diesel-electric transmission
- MU working: 2
- Loco brake: 28LV-1, Air brake for Locomotive using SA-9 brake handle
- Train brakes: Originally Vacuum using A-9 brake handle, some modified to Dual
Performance figures
- Maximum speed: 70 km/h (43 mph)
- Power output: Max: 1,350 hp (1,010 kW); Site rated: 1,300 hp (970 kW)
- Tractive effort: 19.200 t (19 long tons; 21 short tons)
Career
- Operators: Indian Railways, some Sri Lankan industrial concerns
- Numbers: 18901, 18902
- Nicknames: Maruti
- Locale: Burdwan, Liluah Workshop
- First run: 1981
- Withdrawn: 2011
- Preserved: Both units earmarked
- Current owner: Indian Railway
- Disposition: Withdrawn from service

The Indian locomotive class WDM-6 is a class of diesel–electric locomotive that was developed in 1981 by Banaras Locomotive Works (BLW), Varanasi for Indian Railways. The model name stands for broad gauge (W), Diesel (D), Mixed traffic (M) engine, 6th generation (6). Only two WDM-6s were built in 1981 and 1982, and were decommissioned at Burdwan (BWN) in 2011.

== History ==
The WDM-6 was developed to address the need for locomotive to haul commuter and suburban services. They had the same 1350 hp engine and hood superstructure as the metre-gauge YDM-4s with the underframes of the WDM-2. The two WDM-6s were deemed underpowered and subsequently relegated to shunting and departmental duties, based at the diesel locomotive shed in Burdwan (BWN) since the 1980s. One unit was seen shunting at Liluah Workshop. By the late 2010s, both locomotives were withdrawn from service, and are earmarked for preservation.

== Preserved Examples ==
| Class | Manufacturer | Loco Number | Previous shed | Name | Livery | Location | ref |
|---|---|---|---|---|---|---|---|
| WDM-6 | DLW | 18901 | Barddhaman/Burdwan (BWN) | | Brown with yellow lining | Earmarked for preservation: I.R. Heritage Website [November 2018] | |
| WDM-6 | DLW | 18902 | Barddhaman/Burdwan (BWN) | | Brown with white stripe | Earmarked for preservation: I.R. Heritage Website [November 2018] | |

== Former shed ==
- Barddhaman/Burdwan (BWN): All the locomotives of this class has been withdrawn from service.

== See also ==
- Rail transport in India § History
- List of diesel locomotives of India
- Rail transport in India
- Indian locomotive class WDM-2
