= HAZMAT Class 6 Toxic and infectious substances =

Poisonous material is a material, other than a gas, known to be so toxic to humans that it presents a health hazard during transportation.

== Divisions ==
Division 6.1: Poisonous material is a material, other than a gas, which is known to be so toxic to humans as to afford a hazard to health during transportation, or which, in the absence of adequate data on human toxicity:

- Is presumed to be toxic to humans because it falls within any one of the following categories when tested on laboratory animals (whenever possible, animal test data that has been reported in the chemical literature should be used):

1. Oral toxicity: A liquid or solid with a median lethal dose for acute oral toxicity of not more than 300 mg/kg.
2. Dermal toxicity. A material with a median lethal dose for acute dermal toxicity of not more than 1000 mg/kg.
3. Inhalation toxicity: A dust or mist with an LC_{50} for acute toxicity on inhalation of not more than 4 mg/L; or a material with a saturated vapor concentration in air at 20 °C (68 °F) of more than one-fifth of the LC50 for acute toxicity on inhalation of vapors and with an LC50 for acute toxicity on inhalation of vapors of not more than 5000 mL/m^{3}; or

- Is an irritating material, with properties similar to tear gas, which causes extreme irritation, especially in confined spaces.

Division 6.2: Biohazards.

== Placards ==
| Hazardous Materials; Class 6.1: Poison | Hazardous Materials; Class 6.2: Biohazard |
| Hazardous Materials; Class 6: Packing Group III | Hazardous Materials; Class 6: Toxic |

- Poison: 454 kg (1001 lb) or more gross mass of poisonous materials that are not in Hazard Zone A or B (see Assignment of packing groups and hazard zones below). For U.S. domestic use only.
- Inhalation hazard: Any quantity of a material that is in Hazard Zone A or B (see Assignment of packing groups and hazard zones below).
- Toxic: May be used instead of Poison placard on 454 kg (1001 lb) or more gross weight of poisonous materials that are not in Hazard Zone A or B (see Assignment of packing groups and hazard zones below). For international shipments the label must say Toxic if it will be worded.
- PG III (Packing Group III): May be used instead of Poison placard on 454 kg (1001 lb) or more gross weight of Poison PG III materials (see Assignment of packing groups and hazard zones below).

== Lethality ==
=== Median lethal dose ===
1. Oral toxicity: LD_{50} for acute oral toxicity means that dose of the material administered to both male and female young adult albino rats which causes death within 14 days in half the animals tested. The number of animals tested must be sufficient to give statistically valid results and be in conformity with good pharmacological practices. The result is expressed in mg/kg body mass.
2. Dermal toxicity: LD_{50} for acute dermal toxicity means that dose of the material which, administered by continuous contact for 24 hours with the shaved intact skin (avoiding abrading) of an albino rabbit, causes death within 14 days in half of the animals tested. The number of animals tested must be sufficient to give statistically valid results and be in conformity with good pharmacological practices. The result is expressed in mg/kg body mass.

Determining acute LD_{50}
For purposes of classifying and assigning packing groups to mixtures possessing oral or dermal toxicity hazards according to the criteria in 49CFR 173.133(a)(1), it is necessary to determine the acute LD_{50} of the mixture. If a mixture contains more than one active constituent, one of the following methods may be used to determine the oral or dermal LD_{50} of the mixture:
1. Obtain reliable acute oral and dermal toxicity data on the actual mixture to be transported;
2. If reliable, accurate data is not available, classify the formulation according to the most hazardous constituent of the mixture as if that constituent were present in the same concentration as the total concentration of all active constituents; or
3. If reliable, accurate data is not available, apply the formula:
$\tfrac{C_{A}}{T_{A}} + \tfrac{C_{B}}{T_{B}} + \tfrac{C_{Z}}{T_{Z}} = \tfrac{100}{T_{M}}$

where:

$C$= the percent concentration of constituent A, B ... Z in the mixture; $T$ = the oral LD50 values of constituent A, B ... Z;

$T_{M}$ = the oral LD50 value of the mixture.

=== Median lethal concentration ===
LC_{50} for acute toxicity on inhalation means that concentration of vapor, mist, or dust which, administered by continuous inhalation for one hour to both male and female young adult albino rats, causes death within 14 days in half of the animals tested. If the material is administered to the animals as a dust or mist, more than 90% of the particles available for inhalation in the test must have a diameter of 10 μm or less if it is reasonably foreseeable that such concentrations could be encountered by a human during transport. The result is expressed in mg/L of air for dusts and mists or in mL/m^{3} of air (parts per million) for vapors. See 49CFR 173.133(b) for LC50 determination for mixtures and for limit tests.

== Compatibility table ==
Load and Segregation Chart
| | Mass | | 1.1 | 1.2 | 1.3 | 1.4 | 1.5 | 1.6 | 2.1 | 2.2 | 2.2 | 2.3 | | 3 | 4.1 | 4.2 | 4.3 | 5.1 | 5.2 | 6.1 | 7 | 8 |
| | Mass | | 1.1 | 1.2 | 1.3 | 1.4 | 1.5 | 1.6 | 2.1 | 2.2 | 2.2 | A | B | 3 | 4.1 | 4.2 | 4.3 | 5.1 | 5.2 | A | 7 | 8 |
| 6.1A | Any quantity | E | No | No | No | O | No | | O | | | | | No | No | No | No | No | No | | | No |
Key
The absence of any hazard class or division or a blank space in the table indicates that no restrictions apply.: X: These materials may not be loaded, transported, or stored together in the same transport vehicle or storage facility during the course of transportation.; O: Indicates that these materials may not be loaded, transported or stored together in the same transport vehicle or storage facility during the course of transportation, unless separated in a manner that, in the event of leakage from packages under conditions normally incident to transportation, commingling of hazardous materials would not occur.; E: Packages with "Poison" or "Poison Inhalation Hazard" markings, or a "Poison" marking with "PG III" or "PG III" beside a "Poison" label may not be transported with foodstuffs, feed, or any other edible material, intended for consumption by humans or animals. For exceptions see §177.841(e); Source: United States Code of Federal Regulations, Title 49 CFR §177.848 - Segregation of hazardous materials.

== Packing groups ==
Class 6 Packing Groups and Hazard Zones
The packing group of Division 6.1 materials shall be as assigned in Column 5 of the 49CFR 172.101 Table. When the 49CFR 172.101 Table provides more than one packing group or hazard zone for a hazardous material, the packing group and hazard zone shall be determined by applying the following criteria:

1. The packing group assignment for routes of administration other than inhalation of vapors shall be in accordance with the following table:

| Group | Oral toxicity LD_{50} $\tfrac {mg}{kg}$ | Dermal toxicity LD_{50} $\tfrac {mg}{kg}$ | Inhalation toxicity (dust/mist) LC_{50} $\tfrac {mg}{L}$ |
|---|---|---|---|
| I | $\le 5$ | $\le 50$ | $\le 0.2$ |
| II | $> 5$ but $\le 50$ | $> 50$ but $\le 200$ | $> 0.2$ but $\le 2$ |
| III | $> 50$ but $\le 300$ | $> 200$ but $\le 1000$ | $> 2$ but $\le 4$ |

2. The packing group and hazard zone assignments for liquids (see 49CFR 173.115(c) of this subpart for gases) based on inhalation of vapors shall be in accordance with the following Table:

| Packing group | Hazard zone | Vapor concentration and Toxicity |
|---|---|---|
| I | A | $V \ge 500 LC_{50}$; $LC_{50} \le 200 \tfrac{mL}{m^3}$. |
| I | B | $V \ge 10 LC_{50}$; $LC_{50} \le 1000 \tfrac{mL}{m^3}$ The criteria for packing group I, hazard zone A are not met. |
| II | C | $V \ge LC_{50}$; $LC_{50} \le 3000 \tfrac{mL}{m^3}$ The criteria for packing group I, hazard zones A and B are not met. |
| III | D | $V \ge .2 LC_{50}$; $LC_{50} \le 5000 \tfrac{mL}{m^3}$ The criteria for packing groups I and II, hazard zones A, B and C are not met. |
Note 1: V is the saturated vapor concentration in air of the material in $\tfrac{mL}{m^3}$ at 20 °C and standard atmospheric pressure. Note 2: A liquid in Division 6.1 meeting criteria for packing group I, hazard zones A or B stated in paragraph (a)(2) of this section is a material poisonous by inhalation subject to the additional hazard communication requirements in 49CFR 172.203(m)(3), 49CFR 172.313 and Table 1 of 49CFR 172.504(e) of this subchapter.

3. When the packing group determined by applying these criteria is different for two or more (oral, dermal or inhalation) routes of administration, the packing group assigned to the material shall be that indicated for the highest degree of toxicity for any of the routes of administration.

4. Notwithstanding the provisions of this paragraph, the packing group and hazard zone of a tear gas substance is as assigned in Column 5 of the 49CFR 172.101 Table.

The packing group and hazard zone for Division 6.1 mixtures that are poisonous (toxic) by inhalation may be determined by one of the following methods:
Where $LC_{50}$ data is available on each of the poisonous (toxic) substances comprising the mixture:
1. The $LC_{50}$ of the mixture is estimated using the formula:

$LC_{50} (mixture) = \cfrac{1}{ \textstyle \sum_{i=1}^n \cfrac{f_{i}}{LC_{50i}}}$

- where $f_{i}$ = mole fraction of the $i^{th}$ component of the liquid
- $LC_{50i}$ = means lethal concentration of the $i^{th}$ component substance in $\tfrac {mL}{m^3}$

2. The volatility of each component substance is estimated using the formula:

$V_{i} = P_{i} \times \tfrac{10^6}{101.3}[\tfrac{mL}{m^3}]$

where: $P_{i}$ = partial pressure of the $i^{th}$ component substance in kPa at 20°C and one atmospheric pressure. $P_{i}$ may be calculated according to Raoult's Law using appropriate activity coefficients. Where activity coefficients are not available, the coefficient may be assumed to be 1.0.

3. The ratio of the volatility to the LC_{50} is calculated using the formula:

$R = \textstyle \sum_{i=1}^n \tfrac{f_{i}}{LC_{50i}}$
4. Using the calculated values LC_{50} (mixture) and R, the packing group for the mixture is determined as follows:

| Packing group | Hazard zone | Ratio of volatility and LC_{50} |
|---|---|---|
| I | A | $R \ge 500$ and $LC_{50} (mixture) \le 200 \tfrac{mL}{m^3}$ |
| I | B | $R \ge 10$ and $LC_{50} (mixture) \le 1000 \tfrac{mL}{m^3}$; and The criteria for packing group I, hazard zone A are not met. |
| II | C | $R \ge 1$ and $LC_{50} (mixture) \le 3000 \tfrac{mL}{m^3}$; and The criteria for packing group I, hazard zones A and B are not met. |
| III | D | $R \ge \tfrac{1}{5}$ and $LC_{50} (mixture) \le 5000 \tfrac{mL}{m^3}$; and The criteria for packing group I, hazard zones A, B and packing group II. |

In the absence of LC_{50} data on the poisonous (toxic) constituent substances, the mixture may be assigned a packing group and hazard zone based on simplified threshold toxicity tests. When these threshold tests are used, the most restrictive packing group and hazard zone must be determined and used for the transportation of the mixture.
