= Palestine Railways H class =

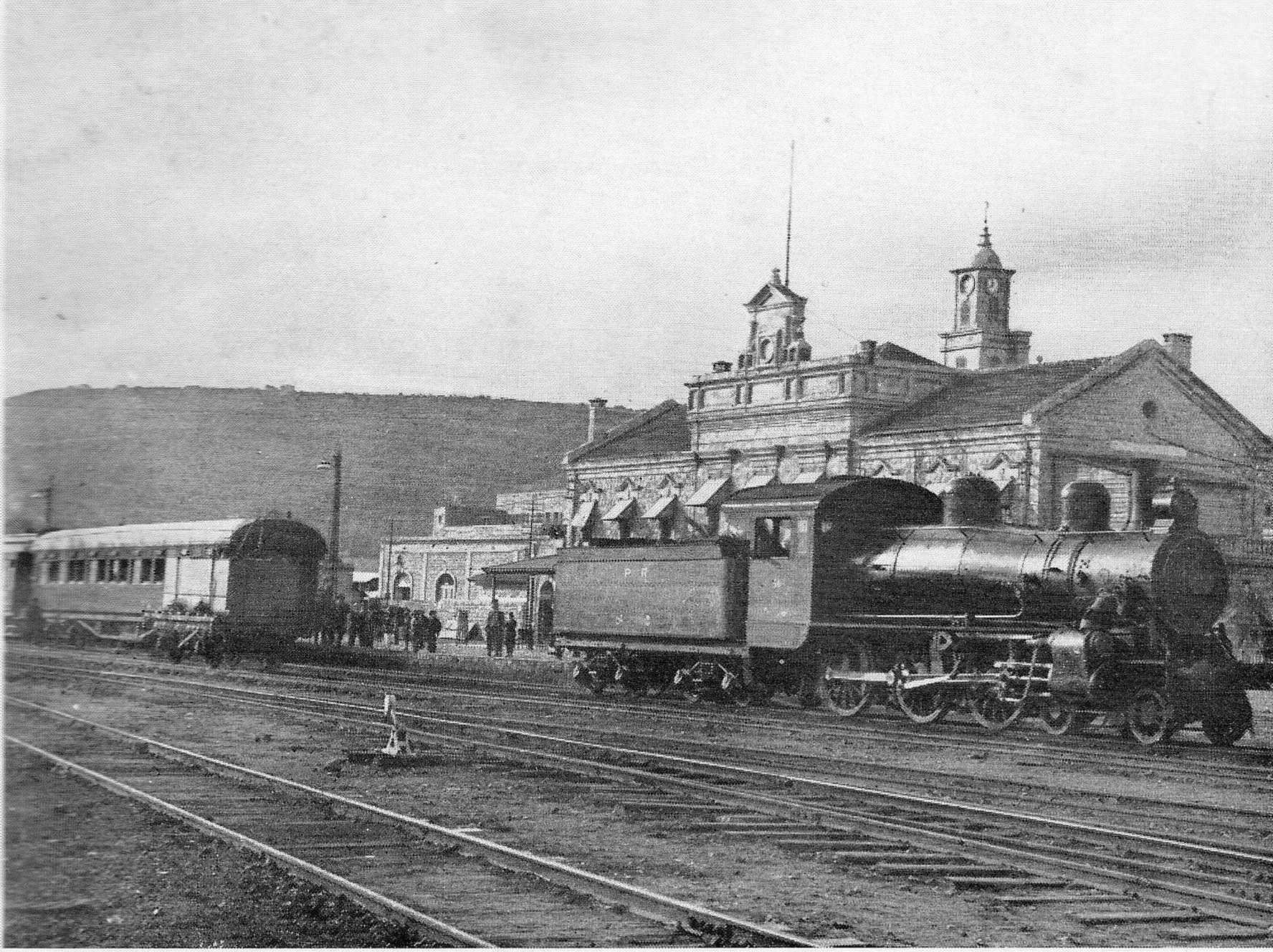
- H class 4-6-0 at Haifa East station in 1931
Type and origin
- Power type: Steam
- Builder: Baldwin Locomotive Works
- Serial number: 50201, 50202, 50311–13, 50315–19, 50347–58, 50446–66, 50618–21, 50634–6
- Build date: 1918
- Total produced: 50
Specifications
- Configuration
  - Whyte: 4-6-0
- Gauge: 1,435 mm (4 ft 8 1/2 in) standard gauge
- Bogies: 6 ft 8 in (2,032 mm) wheelbase
- Leading dia.: 2 ft 9 in (838 mm)
- Driver dia.: 5 ft 2 in (1,575 mm)
- Wheelbase: 24 ft 9 in (7.54 m)
- Length: locomotive 34 ft (10.36 m) from front buffer beam to drawbar; loco & tender 63 ft 1.4 in (19.24 m) over buffers
- Height: 14 ft (4.27 m)
- Axle load: 26 long tons (26.4 t; 29.1 short tons)
- Adhesive weight: 15.8 long tons (16.1 t; 17.7 short tons); 17 long tons (17.3 t; 19.0 short tons); 16.4 long tons (16.7 t; 18.4 short tons)
- Loco weight: 64.75 long tons (65.8 t; 72.5 short tons)
- Total weight: 116.75 long tons (118.6 t; 130.8 short tons) laden
- Fuel type: originally Welsh coal; converted to oil fuel by 1943
- Fuel capacity: 1,732 imperial gallons (2,080 US gal; 7,870 L) (after conversion to oil fuel)
- Water cap.: Class H: 4,800 imperial gallons (5,800 US gal; 22,000 L); Classes H2 & H3: 2,350 imperial gallons (2,820 US gal; 10,700 L)
- Firebox
  - Grate area: 29.2 sq ft (2.71 m^{2})
- Boiler pressure: 190 lbf/in^{2} (1.31 MPa)
- Heating surface: 1,659 sq ft (154.1 m^{2})
- Cylinders: 2, outside
- Cylinder size: 19 in × 26 in (483 mm × 660 mm)
Performance figures
- Tractive effort: 24,479 lbf (108.9 kN)
Career
- Operators: Palestine Military Railway 1919–20; Palestine Railways 1920–48; Israel Railways 1948–60
- Class: H
- Number in class: 50
- Numbers: 871 – 920
- Locale: Mandate Palestine; northern Sinai; latterly Israel
- Delivered: 1919–20
- First run: 1919
- Last run: 1960
- Retired: 1960
- Scrapped: 1960
- Disposition: 6 converted to 4-6-2T in 1926; 5 converted to 4-6-4T in 1933; 6 lost in accidents 1942; all withdrawn by 1960

The Palestine Railways H class was a type of standard gauge mixed traffic steam locomotive on the Palestine Military Railway and its civilian successors Palestine Railways and Israel Railways. The PMR introduced the class in 1919 and Israel Railways withdrew the last ones in 1960.

== Background and delivery ==
The PMR, part of the British Army, was created during World War I to operate all railways in the British and Allied Sinai and Palestine Campaign. It inherited a standard gauge locomotive fleet from the Egyptian Expeditionary Force's Sinai Railway dominated by two classes of 19th-century 0-6-0 requisitioned from railways in Britain: the LNWR 17in Coal Engines and LSWR 395 class. In Palestine the Coal Engines proved unreliable and neither class was powerful enough for PMR traffic.

In 1918 the PMR sought a class of 50 more powerful mixed traffic locomotives to replace the Coal Engines and relegate the 395 class to lighter duties. However, British locomotive builders were so busy with War orders that none could supply a class of 50 locomotives quickly enough.

The UK War Department (WD) had already bought at least 70 4-6-0 locomotives from Baldwin Locomotive Works (BLW) in Eddystone, Pennsylvania in 1917. They carried the WD numbers 801 – 870 of the same class, some of them were fitted with rounded cabs to better fit in the European gauge. All of them were transferred to Belgium at the end of the World War One, and became SNCB/NMBS type 40 in 1926. They hauled passenger trains until 1962. Therefore, in 1918 the PMR ordered a batch of 50 of the same class of 4-6-0 from BLW. The first 10 reached Palestine in 1919 and the remaining 40 followed in 1920. Following on from the batch sent to Europe, this batch received the WD numbers 871 – 920.

In 1920 the San Remo Conference mandated the United Kingdom to administer Palestine. The PMR was duly replaced by a civilian organisation, Palestine Railways, which designated the Baldwins class H. In the 1920s it found the class suitable for most work except shunting and powerful enough for most normal PR traffic.

In service all members of the class were painted black. From 1944 each had its number painted in very large numerals on the side of the tender or tank.

== Modifications ==
The Jerusalem terminus of the Jaffa and Jerusalem line suffered from restricted space, and after conversion to standard gauge never had a facility to turn 4-6-0 tender locomotives. Running tender first was unpopular in any location, but especially on this route which had tight curves and steep gradients through the Judean hills, so PR sought a tank locomotive powerful enough for the job. In 1922 PR introduced the 2-8-4T K class tanks from Kitson & Company in England, which were powerful enough to haul 250 ton trains up the 2% (1 in 50) ruling gradient to Jerusalem but suffered derailments caused by their eight-coupled wheel arrangement.

Therefore, in 1926 PR sent H class locomotives 895, 904, 905, 909, 915 and 918 to Armstrong Whitworth in England whose works at Scotswood in Newcastle-upon-Tyne converted them into 4-6-2T tank locomotives. PR renumbered them consecutively 7 – 12 and designated them class H2. On the steep climb up to Jerusalem these could haul only trains of 200 tons compared with the K class's 250, but this was the best PR could achieve with its limited resources.

Baldwin had built the class with round-topped steel fireboxes but the PR found these unsatisfactory. It therefore sent six more H class to Armstrong Whitworth who fitted copper fireboxes instead. On other H class locomotives PR made modifications themselves, fitting Belpaire fireboxes and reducing the number of domes from three to two.

In 1933 PR opened its own railway workshops in Haifa. In 1937–38, with the help of some parts supplied by Nasmyth, Wilson & Company of Salford, England, the Qishon works converted numbers 881, 896, 897, 910 and 912 to tank locomotives. PR gave this batch a 4-6-4T wheel arrangement, numbered them consecutively 13–17 and designated them class H3.

== Latter years ==
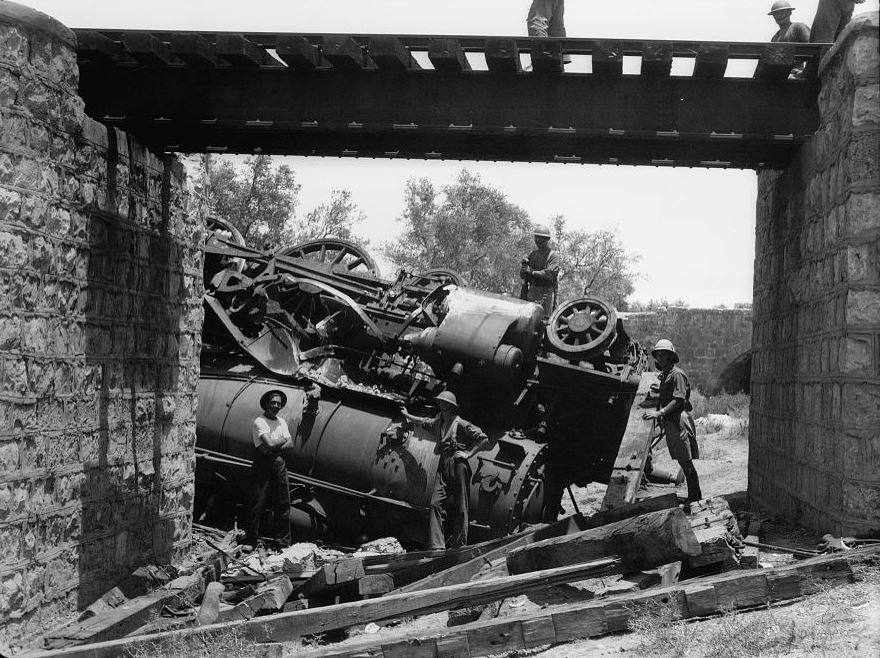
An H-class locomotive wrecked by Arab rebels in 1936

In 1935 the Baldwins were relegated from the heaviest traffic by the arrival of six more powerful P class 4-6-0 locomotives from the North British Locomotive Company in Glasgow, Scotland. During World War II PR carried increasing amounts of British and Allied military traffic. War Department ROD 2-8-0 and LMS Stanier Class 8F 2-8-0 locomotives hauled the heaviest trains but the Baldwins were also worked very hard and in 1942 six were lost to accidents. For example, 888 (works no. 50354) was wrecked by a head-on collision in Gaza and its remains were scrapped two years later.

PR had fuelled its locomotives with Welsh coal but in June 1940 Italy declared war on the Allies, making the Mediterranean extremely dangerous for British merchant shipping. PR therefore began converting its locomotives to burn oil, but it did not complete the conversion programme until 1943.

Despite the more powerful NBL 4-6-0 and 8F 2-8-0 locomotives, after World War II the Baldwins remained PR's most numerous locomotives and its maids of all work. In the 1947–1949 Palestine war PR was a particular target of sabotage and terrorism. When in February 1948 PR's General Manager, Arthur Kirby, recorded that ...locomotives wrecked by mines have been repaired time and time again so that most of them, though blown up several times, are still working after 28 years of service – and working efficiently..., his reference to "28 years" clearly referred to Palestine's surviving Baldwins.

After the UK withdrew from Mandate Palestine in May 1948 all six H2, all five H3 and the 33 surviving H class passed into Israel Railways stock. Baldwin had designed the 4-6-0s to be simple and rugged but not to last particularly long, but the British and Israelis got good service from them for 40 years. By 1956 diesels had taken over the main line services and steam workings were largely confined to the central part of the country around Lod (formerly Lydda). A number of Baldwins remained in service until 1959 and one, H class no. 901 (BLW works no. 50454) was still in traffic six months after steam on Israel Railways had officially ended that year. All 44 of Israel Railways' Baldwins were scrapped by about 1960.

== Sources ==
- Cotterell, Paul (1984). The Railways of Palestine and Israel. Abingdon: Tourret Publishing. ISBN 0-905878-04-3.
- Hughes, Hugh (1981). Middle East Railways. Harrow: Continental Railway Circle. ISBN 0-9503469-7-7.
- Proud, Peter; Smith, C, eds. (1946). The Standard Gauge Locomotives of the Egyptian State Railways and The Palestine Railways 1942–1945. London: Railway Correspondence & Travel Society. p. 7.
- Sherman, A.J. (2001). Mandate Days: British Lives in Palestine, 1918–1948. Baltimore & London: Johns Hopkins University Press. ISBN 0-8018-6620-0.
