= Palestine Railways =

State-owned railway company, 1920–1948

Palestine Railway
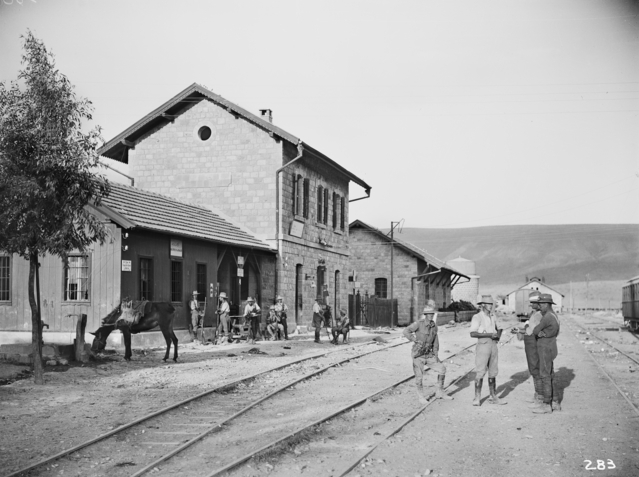
- Samakh station, shortly after being captured by Australian light horsemen on 25 September 1918

Overview
- Headquarters: Khoury House, Haifa
- Locale: British Mandate of Palestine; northern coast of Sinai
- Dates of operation: 1920–1948
- Predecessor: Sinai Military Railway, Jaffa–Jerusalem railway, Jezreel Valley and Acre branches of Hejaz Railway
- Successor: Israel: Israel Railways; Egypt: Egyptian National Railways

Technical
- Track gauge: 1,435 mm (4 ft 8 1/2 in) standard gauge, and 1,050 mm (3 ft 5 11/32 in)
- Previous gauge: 1,050 mm (3 ft 5 11/32 in)

Other

Palestine Railways (Arabic: سكة حديد فلسطين (“Palestine Railways”); Contemporary Hebrew: מסילות ברזל פלשתינה (א"י) (“Palestine (Land of Israel) Railways”) or רכבות ארץ-ישראל (“Land of Israel Railways”); Present-day Hebrew: הרכבת המנדטורית (“Mandate Railways”)) was a government-owned railway company that ran all public railways in the League of Nations mandate territory of Palestine from 1920 until 1948. Its main line linked El Kantara in Egypt with Haifa. Branches served Jaffa, Jerusalem, Acre and the Jezreel Valley.

== Background and predecessors ==
Regional map of past and present railway lines

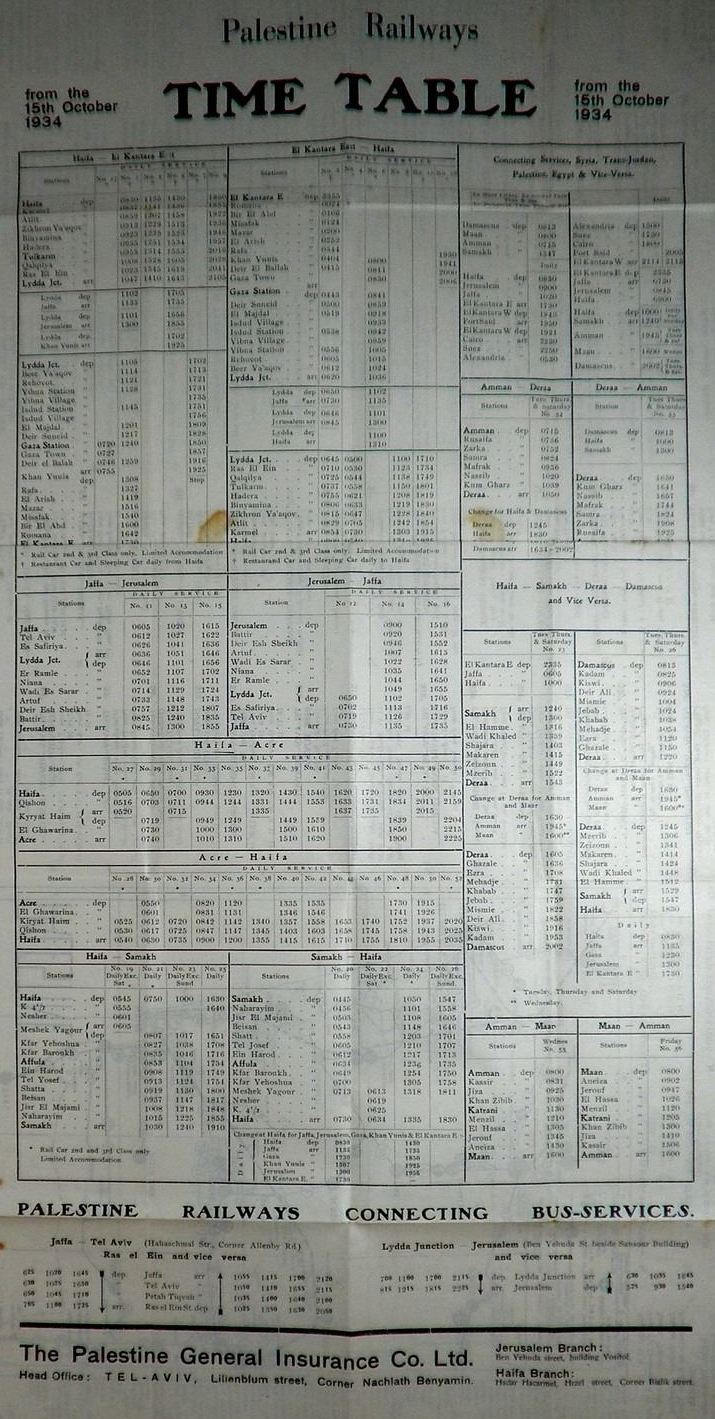
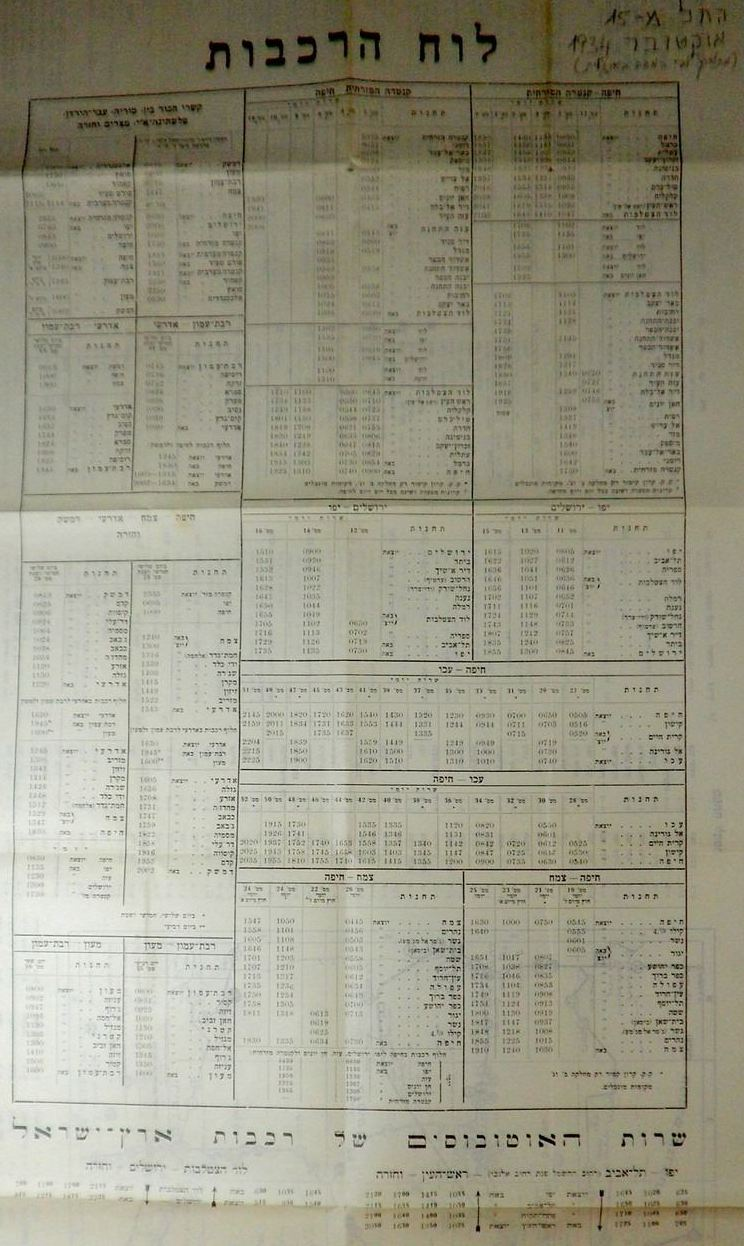
Palestine Railways timetable from October 1934, in English and Hebrew

=== Jaffa–Jerusalem railway ===
The Jaffa–Jerusalem railway, funded by Chemin de Fer Ottoman de Jaffa à Jérusalem et Prolongements, was the first railway to be built in Palestine. Construction started on 31 March 1890 and the line opened on 26 September 1892. It was built to 1,000 mm (3 ft 3 3/8 in) with many tight curves and a ruling gradient of 2% (1 in 50). The eastern part of the line, in the Judean hills between Dayr Aban and Jerusalem, is particularly steep and winding. The "J&J"'s first locomotives were a fleet of five 2-6-0 Mogul tender locomotives from Baldwin in the US, delivered in 1890 and 1892. On a number of occasions the Baldwins' six-coupled driving wheels either spread the rails or became derailed on tight curves. As traffic increased the J&J obtained four 0-4-4-0 Mallet articulated locomotives from Borsig in Germany, delivered between 1904 and 1914. The Mallets were intended to deliver greater tractive effort without spreading the rails, but they too suffered a number of derailments.

In 1915, during World War I, the Ottoman Army widened the track gauge between Lydda and Jerusalem to 1,050 mm (3 ft 5 11/32 in) to allow through running with the Hejaz Railway and removed the track between Lydda and Jaffa for military use elsewhere.

In 1921, the British Government of Palestine seriously considered electrifying the line. Pinhas Rutenberg, the electricity concessionaire of Palestine, had been backed by High Commissioner Samuel in suggesting that the electrification of the line would not only be profitable but also crucial for the successful electrification of the country as a whole. However the Colonial Office backed off, fearing the heavy costs of this project

=== Jezreel Valley railway ===
This was a branch of the Hejaz Railway between Haifa and Daraa in southern Syria where it joined the Hejaz main line. Construction began at Haifa in 1902 and was completed at Daraa in 1905. The Jezreel Valley line, like the Hejaz main line, was built to 1,050 mm (3 ft 5 11/32 in). Construction of a branch from Afula on the Jezreel Valley line to Jerusalem had begun in 1908 and reached Nablus by the outbreak of the First World War in 1914.

=== Ottoman military railways ===
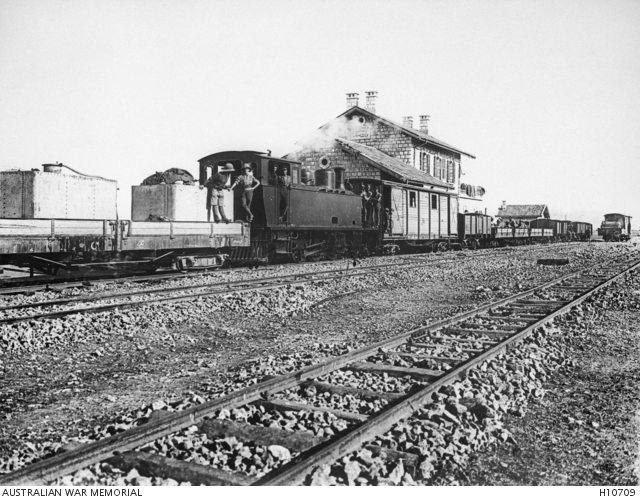
Junction Station, Palestine. c. 1917. The railway station where the Turkish railways to Beersheba and Gaza branch off from the Damascus to Jerusalem main line

The Ottoman Empire needed to supply its forces holding the border of Palestine against British and Empire forces in Egypt. The planned railway from Nablus through hilly country to Jerusalem could not be completed in time, so from 1915 the German railway engineer Heinrich August Meißner oversaw the building of a 1,050 mm (3 ft 5 11/32 in) line westwards from El Mas'udiya to Tulkarm. From Tulkarm the terrain became much easier and a line was built northwards to Hadera and southwards to Lydda where it joined the J&J and later became known as the Eastern Railway. It used the widened J&J track (see above) as far as Wadi Surar where it branched southwards towards the Ottoman front line. By October 1915 the line was operational as far south as Beersheba. A branch was also built from Et Tine just south of Wadi Surar to Deir Seneid, where it branched again to Beit Hanoun and Huj near Gaza. The Ottomans also extended the railway to Beersheba into Sinai as far as Kusseima. Large sections of this line were deliberately targeted and destroyed by British forces in the May 1917 Raid on the Beersheba to Hafir el Auja railway.

=== Sinai Military Railway ===
The Egyptian Expeditionary Force (EEF) of British and British Empire units was formed in March 1916. It began building the standard gauge Sinai Military Railway from El Kantara on the Suez Canal across Sinai, reaching Romani by May 1916, El Arish in January 1917 and Rafah in March 1917.

The SMR borrowed rolling stock and 70 locomotives from Egyptian State Railways including 20 Robert Stephenson & Co. 0-6-0s, 20 Baldwin 2-6-0s and 15 Baldwin 4-4-0s. The SMR also acquired seven small shunting locomotives: two 0-6-0ST saddle tanks built in 1900 and 1902 that J. Aird & Co. had been using on a civil engineering project in Egypt (probably the Assiut Barrage), four 0-6-0ST's that had been built in 1917 for the Inland Waterways and Docks Department in Britain and one German 0-6-0WT that was part of the cargo of a merchant ship that the Royal Navy captured in 1914. The German locomotive had been built by Hanomag in Hanover in 1913 and all the saddle tanks had been built by Manning Wardle in Leeds, England.

=== Palestine Military Railway ===
The EEF captured Beersheba in October 1917 and Gaza in November. EEF engineers extended the SMR to Deir Seneid by the end of November 1917 and a branch to Beersheba by May 1918. From Deir Seneid, EEF engineers worked northwards converting the Ottoman tracks to standard gauge, reaching Lydda by February 1918, converting the branch to Jerusalem by June and continuing as far as Tulkarm on the Eastern Railway. From there they built the standard gauge line on a new route northwest to the coast and then northwards, reaching Haifa by the end of 1918.

As the EEF advanced into Palestine it formed a new organisation, the Palestine Military Railway, to operate the various railways of various gauges that came under its control. Royal Engineers units restored Palestine's railways to working condition. The PMR laid a number of temporary 600 mm (1 ft 11 5/8 in) narrow gauge lines, including one between Lydda and Jaffa on the J&J trackbed from which the Ottoman army had removed the 1,000 mm (3 ft 3 3/8 in) metre gauge track in 1915. The PMR borrowed several 3 ft 6 in (1,067 mm) locomotives to work the 1,050 mm (3 ft 5 11/32 in) narrow gauge tracks, which were a very tight fit.

== Operations ==
In April 1920 the San Remo conference mandated the United Kingdom to administer Palestine: a decision endorsed by a League of Nations mandate in 1922. In October 1920 railway administration was duly transferred from the military PMR to a new company, Palestine Railways (PR), owned by the British Mandate government. Throughout the military operations of the Ottoman and British Empires the Jaffa – Jerusalem railway had remained the property of the French Société du Chemin de Fer Ottoman de Jaffa à Jérusalem et Prolongements. The French sought £1.5 million from the British for the J&J but after arbitration accepted £565,000 paid in instalments. The Lydda – Jaffa section was converted from 600mm gauge to standard gauge and reopened in September 1920.

As PR's north-south main line had laid speedily for military purposes and its Jaffa – Jerusalem and Jezreel Valley lines were steeply graded, its trains were not very fast. Its highest speed limit was 50 miles per hour (80 km/h) and even its best trains achieved less than 30 miles per hour (48 km/h) overall between termini.

From 1920 PR developed a daily Haifa – El Kantara mixed traffic service. Wagons-Lits provided restaurant and sleeping cars three days per week until 1923, when this luxury service was increased to daily.

Palestine lacked a deep-water seaport until 1933 when one was built at Haifa. Until then, cargo that Palestinian ports could not handle would pass through Port Said in Egypt. Egyptian State Railways carried the freight between Port Said and El Kantara and PR carried it between El Kantara East and Palestine. No bridge was built across the Suez Canal until 1941, so freight was ferried across the canal between the ESR and PR stations on opposite banks at El Kantara. This would have included deliveries of locomotives and rolling stock to PR.

PR passenger traffic declined significantly in the 1920s and '30s. The competition from increasing numbers of private cars reduced first-class and then second-class passenger traffic, such that by 1934, 95% of remaining passengers were third-class. The onset of the Great Depression in 1929 badly affected tourist traffic, from which the PR never recovered.

== The Pole Committee ==
As PR's finances deteriorated, in 1934 the United Kingdom government appointed a committee of investigation led by Sir Felix Pole, former chairman of Britain's Great Western Railway. Pole also had the specific task of advising to improve stations and the railway route to improve links between Jaffa, Tel-Aviv and Haifa. The other members of Pole's committee were C. M. Jenkin-Jones of Britain's London and North Eastern Railway and the accountant Sir Laurence Halsey, who was a partner in Price Waterhouse. Jenkin-Jones' specific task was to advise how to develop traffic facilities, traffic organisation and what rates to charge. Halsey was to advise on the accounting system and the establishment of an adequate renewals fund.

In the 1934–35 financial year Palestine Railways suffered a net deficit of £87,940. Later in 1935 Pole's committee published its report, which really was three related reports from the three committee members. Each member's recommendations called for considerable investment. Pole criticised the way the railway was operated around the key central junction at Lydda. It identified serious under-investment, reporting that Jaffa and Tel Aviv stations were "inadequate and unsuitable" and "traffic congestion [was] considerable" around Lydda. Passengers between Haifa and Tel Aviv or Jaffa had to change at Lydda, which was both inadequate for passengers and a source of congestion at Lydda station.

Pole therefore recommended building two new link lines from Tel Aviv to by-pass Lydda: a northerly one to Magdiel on the Haifa main line to create a direct Haifa – Tel Aviv – Jaffa route and a southerly one through Rishon LeZion and over the El Kantara main line at Rehoboth to a junction with the Jerusalem line at Niana.

In July 1935 in the UK House of Commons the Liberal MP Barnett Janner asked Malcolm MacDonald, Secretary of State for the Colonies:

"whether he is aware of the discontent with the present services provided by the Palestine railways; and whether he can now give an assurance that, as a consequence of the recent official inquiry into this matter, remedial action will be set on foot during the current year?"

MacDonald replied:

"Until a few years ago the financial position of Palestine restricted expenditure on the maintenance and improvement of the railways, but additional revenue is now available and considerable sums have already been spent and are about to be spent for this purpose. Any further action which may be found to be necessary arising out of recent expert enquiries will be taken as soon as possible."

Despite MacDonald's promise PR never received the necessary capital and neither of Pole's proposed lines was ever built by Palestine Railways. The only extension that Pole recommended and PR did build was a short extension for freight from Jaffa station to the harbour. Jaffa harbour was so constrained by hazardous rocks that only small vessels dared to enter it; ocean-going cargo ships would lie off-shore and transfer their freight to or from the docks by lighters. Pole's recommendation to rebuild the harbour was not implemented, so as a result PR's new freight line received little use.

== Locomotives ==
=== Palestine Military Railway locomotives ===
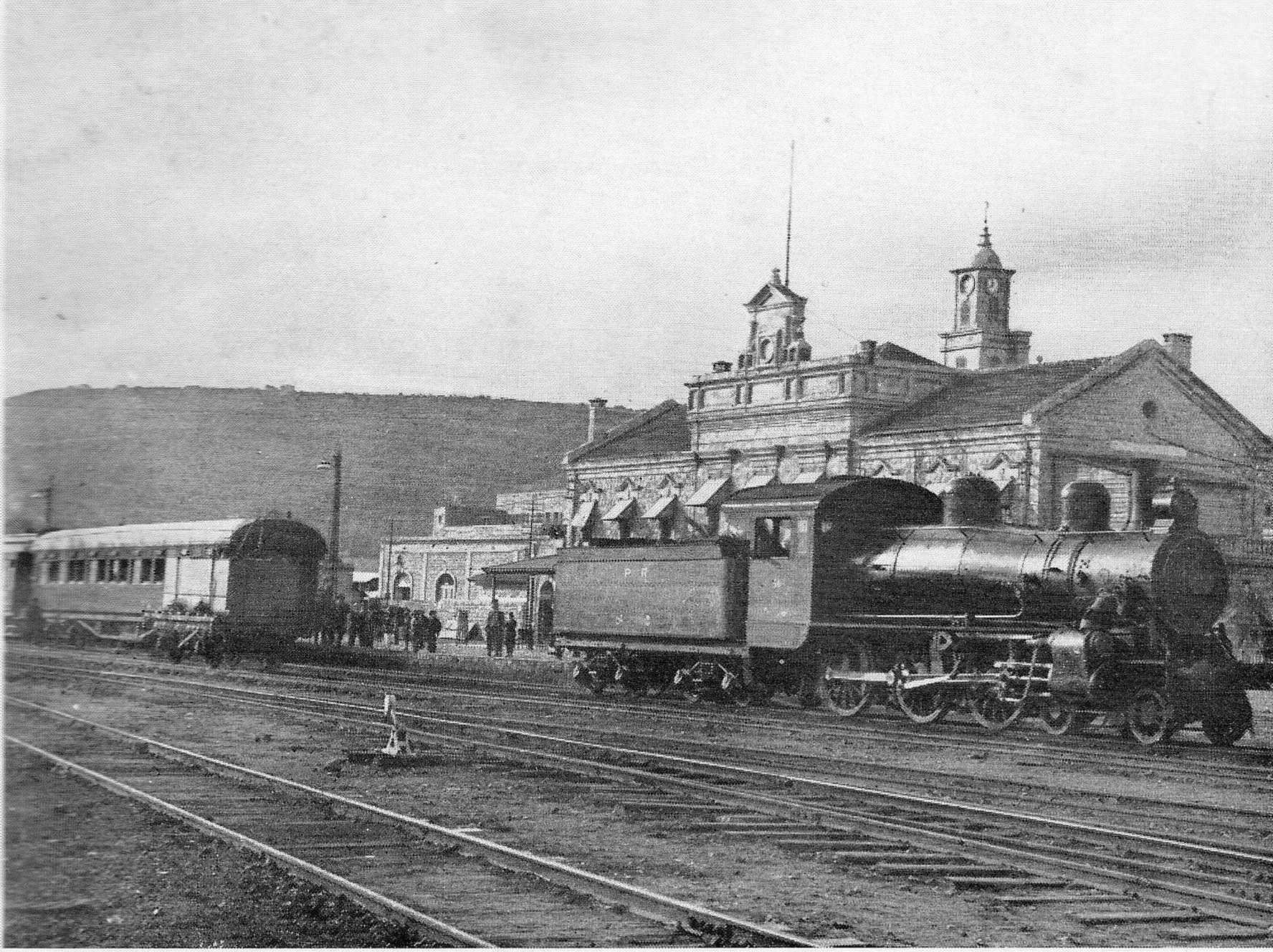
Haifa East station in 1931 with passenger train and 1918 Baldwin H class 4-6-0

For standard gauge use overseas the British Government requisitioned many London and North Western Railway "Coal Engine" 0-6-0s and 50 London and South Western Railway 395 Class 0-6-0s. The British Government sent 42 LNWR and 36 LSWR locomotives to the PMR

In 1918 the PMR ordered 50 new locomotives. British factories were fully occupied so the order was placed with Baldwin in the USA. They were 4-6-0s of a simple wartime design, widely used elsewhere including on railways in Belgium. The first ten were delivered to Palestine in April 1919. They had 5 ft 2 in (1,570 mm) driving wheels suitable for mixed traffic use.

The PMR suffered at least one serious accident. In about 1918 the older of the Manning Wardle saddle tanks that the PMR had acquired from J. Aird & Co. was shunting at Jerusalem when the weight of its train became too much for it to hold on the gradient. The train ran away downhill towards Bittir and collided with an LSWR 395 Class that was climbing towards Jerusalem. The resulting collision "practically demolished" the saddle tank.

=== Palestine Railways locomotives ===
The LNWR 0-6-0s were old, worn out and performed very badly in Palestine, so PR retired all of them for scrap by 1922. The LSWR 0-6-0s performed better, so PR kept most of them in service until 1928 and retained the last nine as shunting locomotives until 1936.

==== M class ====
The four Manning Wardle saddle tanks from the Inland Waterways and Docks Department were identical so PR designated them class M. These were satisfactory as shunting locomotives and PR kept them in service for many years. The J. Aird & Co. Manning Wardles were dissimilar and the PMR had already lost the older one in 1918 in a collision on the Jerusalem branch with an LSWR 395 class (see above). PR disposed of the Hanomag well tank and the former Aird 1902 Manning Wardle for scrap in 1928.

==== K class ====
The Baldwin 4-6-0 locomotives were successful on most of Palestine's standard gauge network but could not haul adequate loads on the steep gradients from Jaffa via Lydda to Jerusalem. In 1922 PR obtained six engines from Kitson and Company in Leeds, England, specifically designed to be powerful enough for the Jerusalem service. They were 2-8-4T tank locomotives designated class K. They had 4 ft 0 in (1,220 mm) driving wheels, a diameter suitable for low-speed freight work and also for mountain gradients. The track gauge on the tight curves on the Jerusalem branch was widened from 1,435 mm (4 ft 8 1/2 in) to as much as 4 ft 9.75 in (1,467 mm) but unfortunately even with this adjustment the heavy eight-coupled class K was unsuitable and suffered a number of derailments.

==== H, H2 and H3 classes ====
PR designated the Baldwin 4-6-0s class H. In 1926 six were shipped to Armstrong Whitworth and Company in Newcastle upon Tyne, England who rebuilt them as 4-6-2T tank locomotives, designated class H2. In 1933 PR opened its own railway workshops in Haifa. In 1937, with the help of some parts supplied by Nasmyth, Wilson and Company in Salford, England, the Qishon works converted five class H 4-6-0s to 4-6-4T tank locomotives, designated class H3.

==== Sentinels ====
In 1928 PR bought one vertical-boilered 0-4-0T shunting locomotive and two vertical-boilered steam-powered railcars for local services from Sentinel-Cammell in Shrewsbury, England. Each railcar unit had two coach bodies articulated over three bogies. The shunter was capable of only light duties and by the end of the Second World War PR had stored it out of use. PR found the railcar format inflexible, as if passenger numbers exceeded the capacity of a railcar it was not practical to couple up an extra coach. In 1945 PR removed the Sentinel engines and converted the railcars to ordinary coaching stock.

==== N class ====
After 1928 PR retained a few 395 class 0-6-0s for shunting, but they were approaching 50 years old so in 1934 PR obtained three purpose-built 0-6-0T shunting locomotives from Nasmyth, Wilson to start replacing them. These were designated class N and PR took delivery of seven more in the period 1935–38.

North British Locomotive Co. P class 4-6-0, built for Palestine Railways 1935, in Israel Railways service on the turntable at Haifa in 1950

==== P class ====
H class 4-6-0s hauled the Haifa – El Kantara service until 1935, when the North British Locomotive Company in Glasgow, Scotland supplied six more powerful 4-6-0s that PR designated class P. These had a tractive effort of 28,470 lbf (126.6 kN): 16% more than the 24,479 lbf (108.9 kN) of classes H, H2 and H3. Class P also had 5 ft 6 3/4 in (1,695 mm) driving wheels: a mixed-traffic diameter by British standards but larger than those of the H series and therefore more suitable for higher speed traffic.

==== Reliability ====
PR suffered frequent locomotive failures. In 1934 its locomotives averaged 7,860 miles (12,650 km) between failures, whereas the figure for locomotives in Great Britain for the same year was 88,229 miles (141,991 km). Staff error caused 17% of failures but far more were caused by poor water, which PR's General Manager reported was "the most pressing of all the railway problems". PR sought to alleviate this by building water softening plants at the main watering points on its network, frequently chemically testing the water and eventually fitting all locomotives with blowing down apparatus with which the driver could purge sludge from the boiler.

=== World War II locomotives ===
==== Steam ====
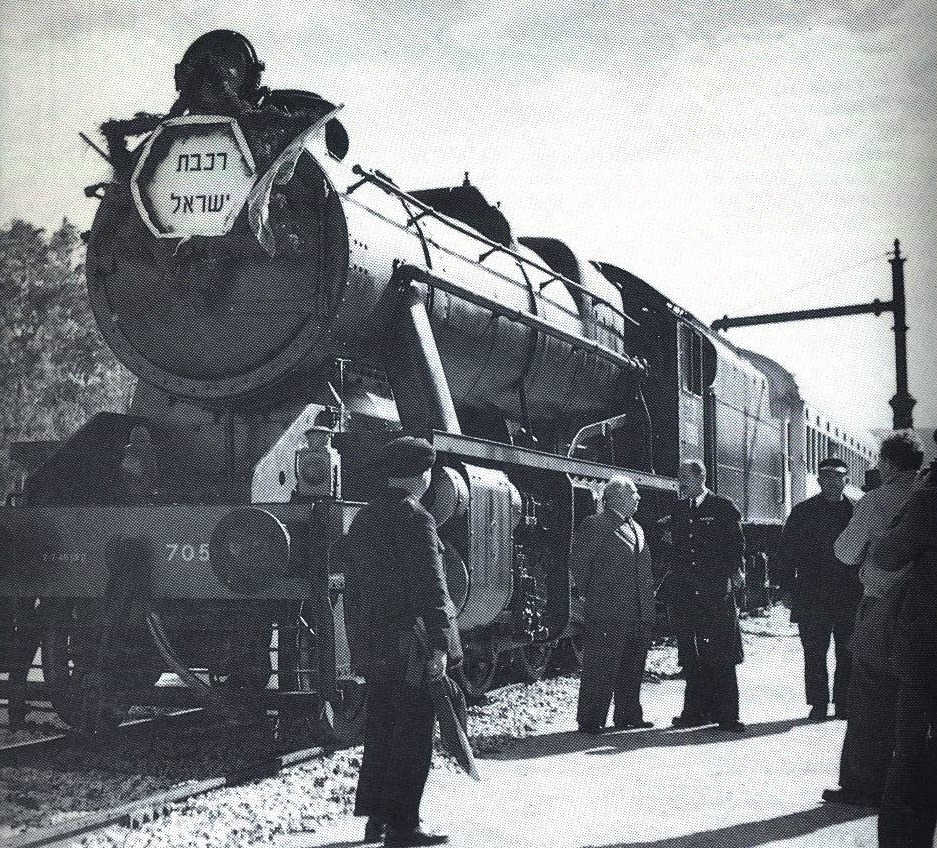
Stanier 8F 2-8-0 70513, built by NBL in Glasgow in 1941, in Israel Railways service taking water at Zichron Ya'akov on 4 January 1949

PR had fuelled its locomotives with Welsh coal but in June 1940 Italy declared war on the Allies and France surrendered to Germany and Italy, leaving the Mediterranean extremely dangerous for British merchant shipping. Early in 1942 PR belatedly began to convert its locomotives to burn oil, but it did not complete the conversion programme until 1943.

In 1941 Britain started to supply two types of 2-8-0 Consolidation freight locomotive to its Middle East Command. One was the ROD 2-8-0 class that had been designed in 1911 as the Great Central Railway Class 8K and that the UK's War Department (WD) had adopted as a standard design to be mass-produced for military traffic in the First World War. The other was the London, Midland and Scottish Railway Stanier 8F that had been designed in 1935 and that the WD now adopted as a standard design to be mass-produced for military use in the Second World War.

As Allied forces concentrated on defending Egypt and the Suez Canal from Italian and German attack the first shipments of 2-8-0s were delivered to Egypt, but in March 1942 both types started to arrive in Palestine and by June 1942 24 ROD locomotives were working on PR and the Haifa – Beirut – Tripoli (HBT) line. In 1944-45 the ROD locomotives were transferred out of Palestine and replaced by LMS locomotives that had been in service on the Trans-Iranian Railway. Other LMS locomotives were overhauled in Palestine in 1944 before being deployed either elsewhere in the Middle East or to the part of Italy now under Allied control.

In the second half of 1942 the USA started to supply locomotives to the British Middle East Command. By December 1942, 27 USATC S200 Class 2-8-2 Mikados were working the PR and HBT main lines and two USATC S100 Class 0-6-0T switchers were supplementing PR's shunting fleet.

==== Diesel ====
,By June 1943 12 Whitcomb 65-DE-14 650 HP diesel-electric locomotives from the US were working on the HBT and by 12 December more were working on the PR. The latter were an effective replacement for PR's Baldwins on the steeply graded Jerusalem line but within a few months all had been transferred to double the diesel fleet on the HBT. Whitcomb diesels were the HBT's principal motive power until the middle of 1944, when they were replaced with ROD 2-8-0s and transferred to Italy.

== 1936–1939 Arab Revolt ==
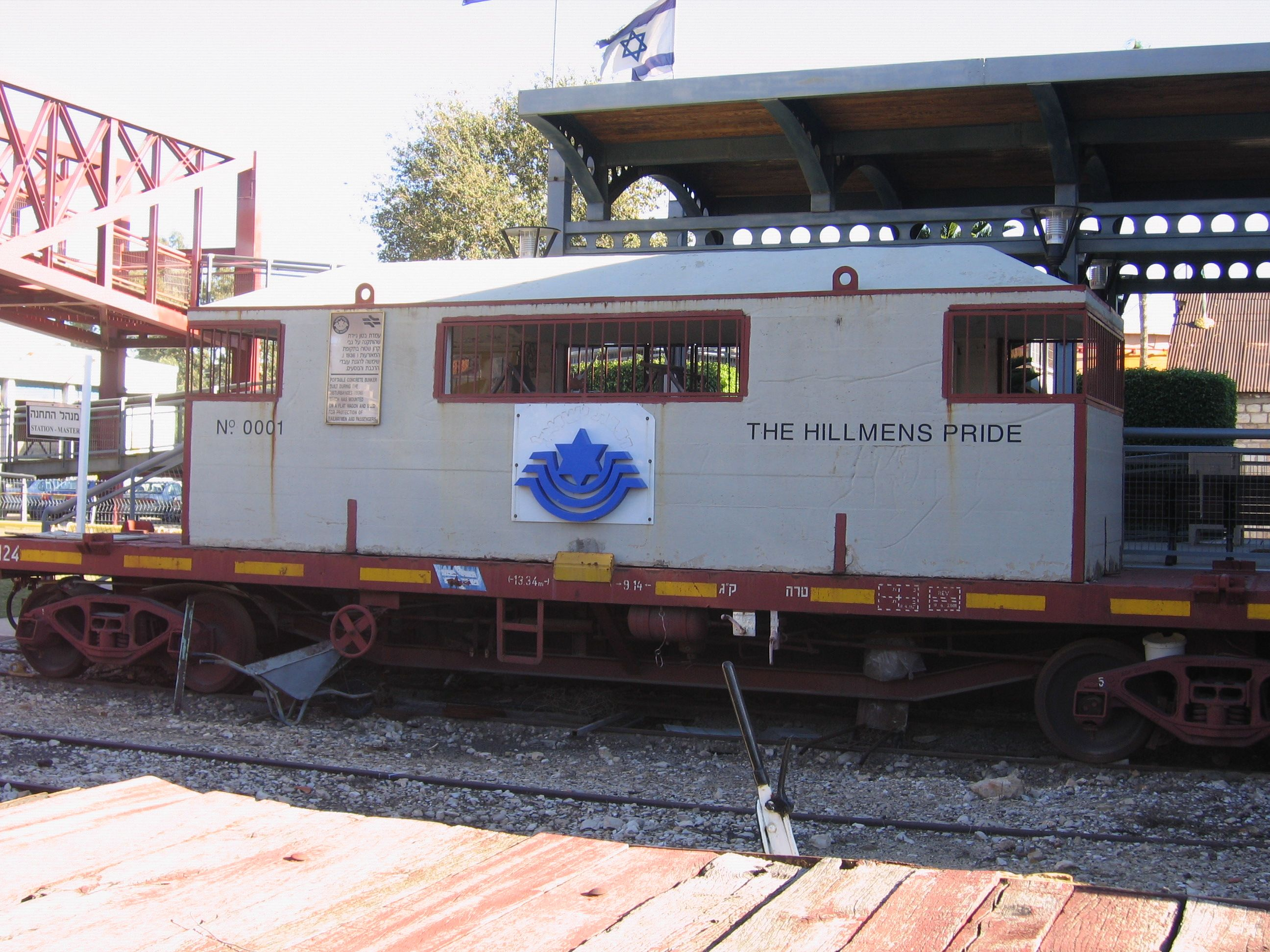
British concrete bunker mounted on flat wagon, 1936, now preserved at the Israel Railway Museum

In 1936–1939 Palestinian Arabs opposed to Jewish mass immigration revolted against British rule. Railways were a particular target for sabotage. The British built blockhouses to protect bridges and regular military patrols of railway lines. Patrols were initially on foot, then in armoured freight vans propelled by locomotives with armoured cabs, and finally with dozens of rail-mounted armoured cars built at Qishon works. After one was blown up by a mine, killing a soldier, the front of each armoured car was fitted with a long bar propelling a pony truck intended to detonate any mine safely without injuring any of the armoured car's occupants. British soldiers made Arab hostages ride on the pony truck so that any mine would be likely to kill them.

Security measures failed to stop attacks on the railway. One attack damaged a Sentinel railcar. In October 1937 a more serious attack damaged a passenger train and prompted a further decline in passenger numbers. In 1938 sabotage derailed 44 trains, damaged 33 rail-mounted armoured cars, destroyed 27 stations and other buildings, damaged 21 bridges and culverts and destroyed telephone and signalling equipment and water supplies. A member of the Survey of Palestine recalled that "nearly all the stations on the railway had been burnt". For more than one period night running became so dangerous that it was suspended. In September 1938 first the Jerusalem line and then El Kantara line were closed by extensive sabotage. After the latter was reopened in October, Haifa – El Kantara trains were run only three days per week compared with the previous daily service. The worst year was 1938, in which 13 railway workers were killed and 123 injured.

== World War II extensions and operations ==
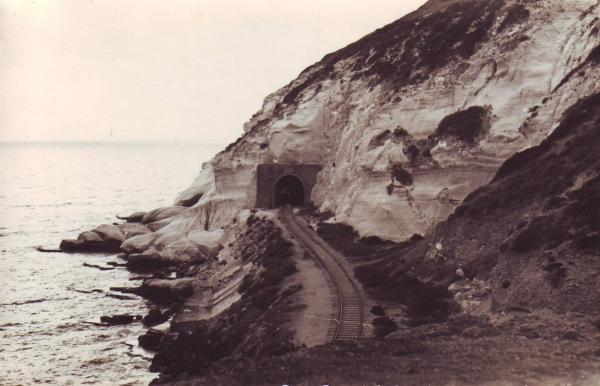
The HBT line, completed in 1942, approaching the south portal of Rosh HaNikra Tunnel on the Lebanese border

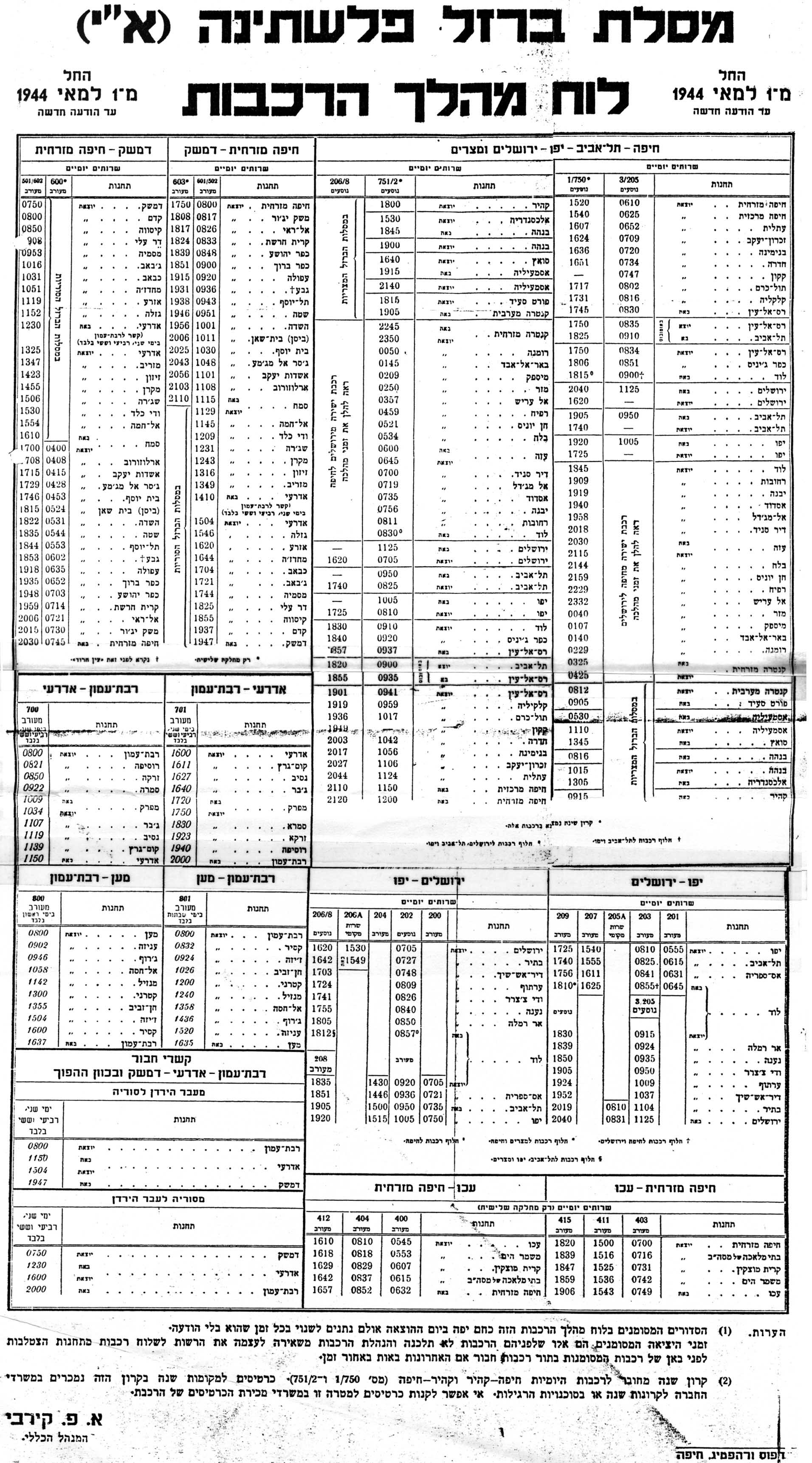
Wartime timetable effective from 1 May 1944

During the Second World War traffic on PR increased dramatically from 1940 to 1945. The PR main line was a supply route for the North African Campaign that lasted from the Italian attack on Egypt in 1940 until the German surrender in Tunisia in May 1943. In April – May 1941 the Italian air force and German Luftwaffe used Vichy French air bases in the mandated territories of Syria and Lebanon as staging posts to support Rashid Ali's coup d'état against Iraq's pro-British government. British and Empire forces landed in southern Iraq and overthrew the coup in the brief Anglo-Iraqi War of May 1941. Then in June and July 1941 PR served as a supply route for the British Empire invasion of Vichy Syria and Lebanon.

PR suffered relatively few enemy air attacks. In 1941 Haifa suffered several air raids, one of which left an unexploded bomb within a few yards of the line. The last significant air attack on the railway was late in 1942, damaging the rail link to Haifa port. The attacks killed one railway worker and wounded ten more.

=== Suez canal area ===
In June 1941 Australian Army Engineers started building a line alongside the Suez Canal southwards from PR's terminus at El Kantara. In July 1941 they connected the new line with Egyptian State Railways (ESR) by a swing bridge at El Ferdan across the canal. In August 1941 PR started operating a through service between Haifa and Cairo. Construction of the line beside the canal continued until July 1942 when it reached El Shatt. ESR then took over operation of the completed route.

=== Haifa – Beirut – Tripoli (HBT) line ===
South African Army engineers built the first section of a new Haifa – Beirut – Tripoli (HBT) railway, branching off the 1050 mm gauge Haifa – Acre line and running along the rocky coast and through two tunnels to Beirut. For its construction the HBT initially used 1050 mm gauge track throughout the Haifa – Beirut section for through running of traffic carrying railway construction materials. The South Africans were transferred to other duties and the Haifa – Beirut section was completed by the New Zealand Railway Group. The New Zealand Railway Group also operated the 1050 mm gauge Jezreel Valley railway between Haifa and Daraa on the Syrian border, the Daraa – Damascus section of the 1050 mm gauge Hejaz Railway main line and 60 miles (97 km) of branch lines including the 1050 mm line between Afula on the Jezreel Valley railway, Nablus, and Tulkarm on the main line between Haifa and Lydda. The Afula – Mas'udiya service ended in 1932, and the Tulkarm – Mas'udiya – Nablus service in 1938, except for a 5 km dual gauge section between Tulkarm and the ballast quarries at Nur Shams.

By August 1942, the Haifa – Beirut section was complete, the track was converted to standard gauge, and the stretch between Haifa and Acre, which was shared with the Jezreel Valley railway, to dual gauge. The new railway line started carrying through military traffic between Egypt, Palestine and Lebanon. By then Australian Royal Engineers were already building the Beirut – Tripoli section, which they completed in December 1942. PR operated the HBT between Haifa and Az-Zeeb just south of the Lebanese border and the British military Middle East Command operated the HBT between Az-Zeeb and Tripoli.

=== Traffic growth ===
Completion of the Ferdan bridge and HBT hugely enhanced PR's strategic role. PR's annual freight traffic grew from 858,995 tons in 1940-41 to 2,194,848 tons in 1943-44. The huge growth in the number of trains increased the potential for accidents. There were three head-on collisions and in 1942 six H class 4-6-0s were written off in accidents. The war effort both increased wear on equipment and reduced resources for maintenance. In November 1944 a downpour derailed an El Kantara – Haifa train, killing seven people and injuring 40.

== 1945–1948 ==
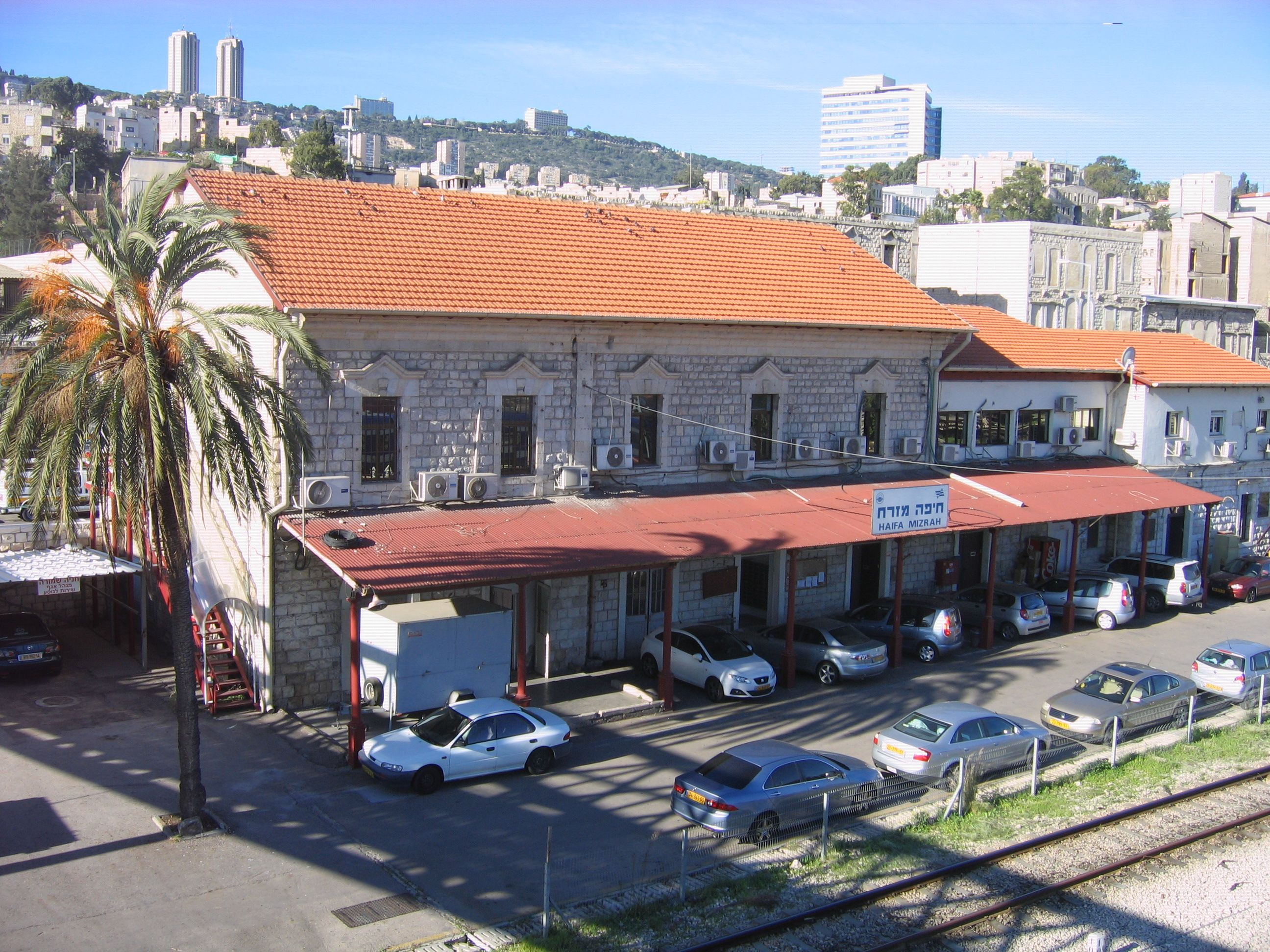
Only part of Haifa East station survived its 1946 terrorist bombing. It is now part of the Israel Railway Museum

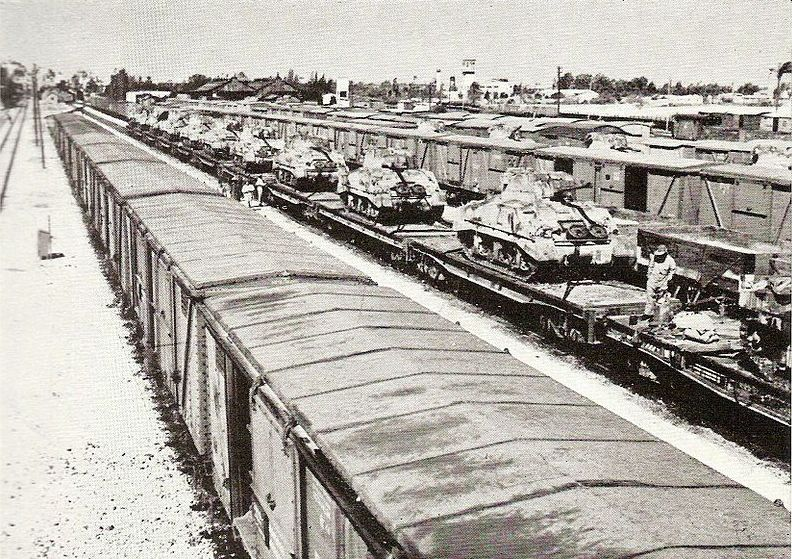
Haifa East freight yard in 1946 with military traffic including two trains of Sherman tanks

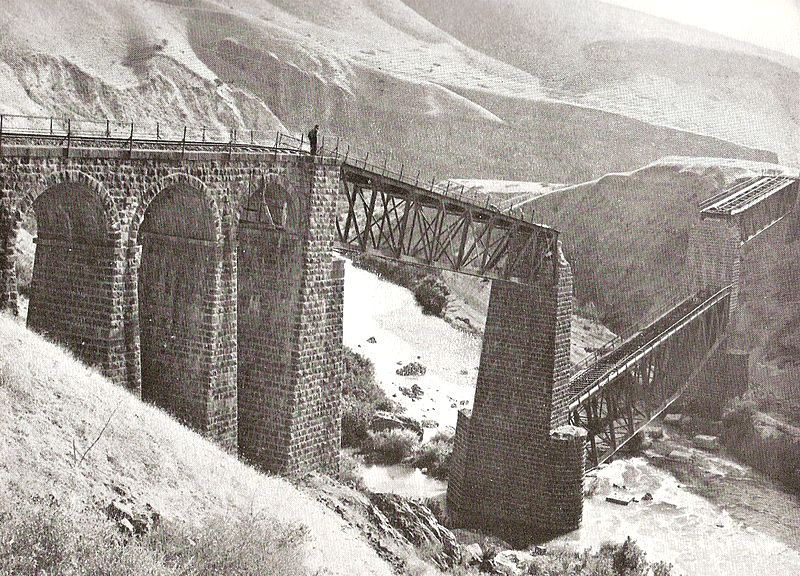
Yarmuk Bridge on the 1050 mm gauge Jezreel Valley line after Palmach sabotage on the Night of the Bridges, 16–17 June 1946

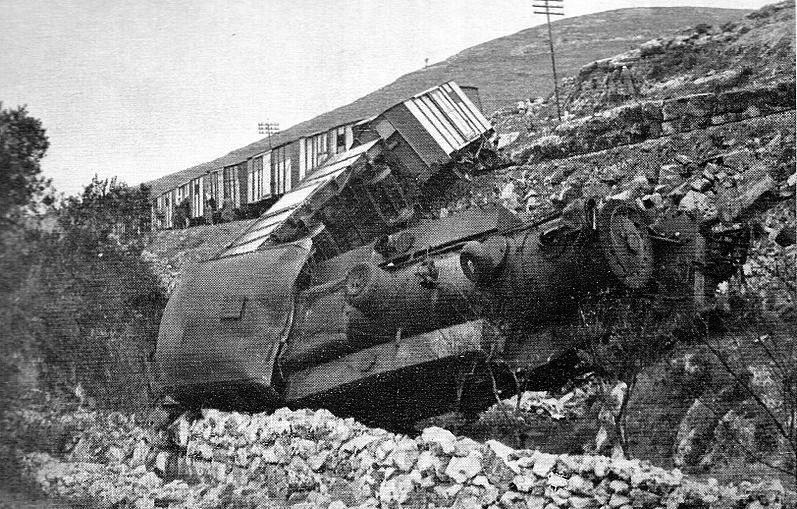
Kitson K-class 2-8-4T and train of 4-wheel freight vans on the Jaffa – Jerusalem line after being sabotaged by Jewish terrorists in 1946

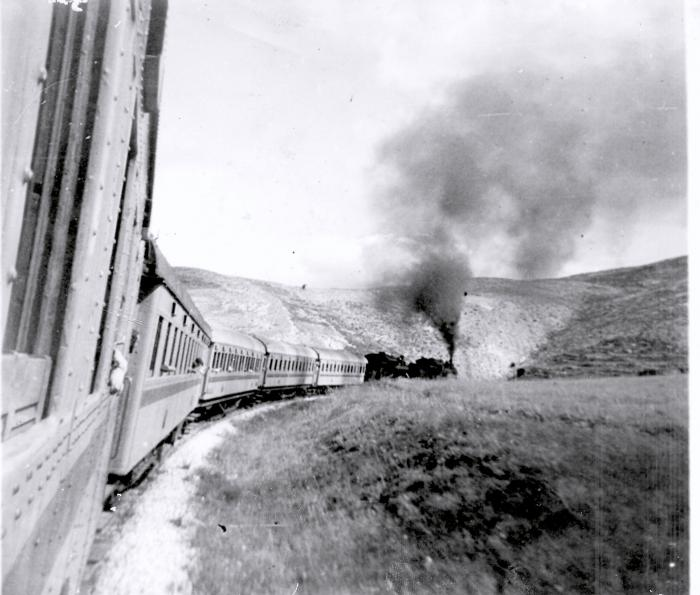
Jaffa to Jerusalem train climbing the Judean hills east of Lydda, 1947

Most ROD and S200 locomotives were withdrawn from Palestine before the end of the Second World War and the remaining few soon followed, but PR took 24 LMS 8F's and the two S100s into its locomotive fleet.

In 1945 Zionist paramilitary organisations formed an alliance, the Jewish Resistance Movement, which launched a war against British administration in which members of the Palmach, Irgun and Lehi organisations sabotaged the PR network at 153 places throughout Palestine. Terrorists robbed a train delivering wages to railway staff. In 1946 a terrorist bomb demolished the main part of the Haifa East station building. In the Night of the Bridges of 16–17 June that year, Palmach saboteurs destroyed 11 road and rail links with neighbouring countries including PR's 1,435 mm (4 ft 8 1/2 in) standard gauge links with Egypt and Lebanon and its 1,050 mm (3 ft 5 11/32 in) gauge link with Syria.

On 22 April 1947, terrorists blew up an El Kantara – Haifa train near Rehovot, killing five British soldiers and a number of civilians. As security deteriorated, theft from the railway increased. British security forces failed to intervene to protect the railway and in some cases took part in looting its assets. In January 1948 the General Manager, Arthur Kirby, vainly pleaded with Sir Henry Gurney, Chief Secretary of the Mandate Government, for adequate armed protection for the railway and its 6,000 staff, otherwise they would cease to do their duty and "I cannot guarantee to keep the railways operating". In February Kirby noted:

...locomotives wrecked by mines have been repaired time and time again so that most of them, though blown up several times, are still working after 28 years of service – and working efficiently... We have no fewer than 50 personnel of the train crews absent from duty, some in hospital, suffering from the effects of having been interfered with while trying to perform their duty. Men have been killed while performing their duties. Running trains are subject to attack and the principal marshalling depot is constantly being fired over by snipers... [but] so long as the present Railway Management exists, it will endeavour to maintain the railways and ports as fully as possible without fear or favour and irrespective of politics.

On 31 March 1948 another train was blown up by a terrorist mine near Binyamina south of Haifa, killing 40 civilians and wounding 60. By April 1948 Kirby described snipers' and saboteurs' killing of railway staff as "incessant". In 1948 terrorists attacked PR's head office, Khoury House in Haifa, and the resulting fire badly damaged the accounts department. PR's telephone and telegraph network was destroyed and Jewish terrorists stole Kirby's car at gunpoint.

Kirby instructed his staff:

The intention of the Management is that the Railways will be kept in operation and handed over on 15th May as a going concern. The severe loss of Khoury House, Headquarters, and the secession of Arab staff in Haifa will not interfere with this intention... All staff reporting for duty will be allocated to the best advantage, irrespective of the Branch in which they have been hitherto employed...

Privately Kirby wrote to Gurney:

I have been expected to carry on the railways and ports under almost impossible conditions; I have taken upon myself risks and responsibilities that have seldom, if ever befallen the General Manager of a Colonial Railway; I have achieved more than could have been hoped for....

== Aftermath ==
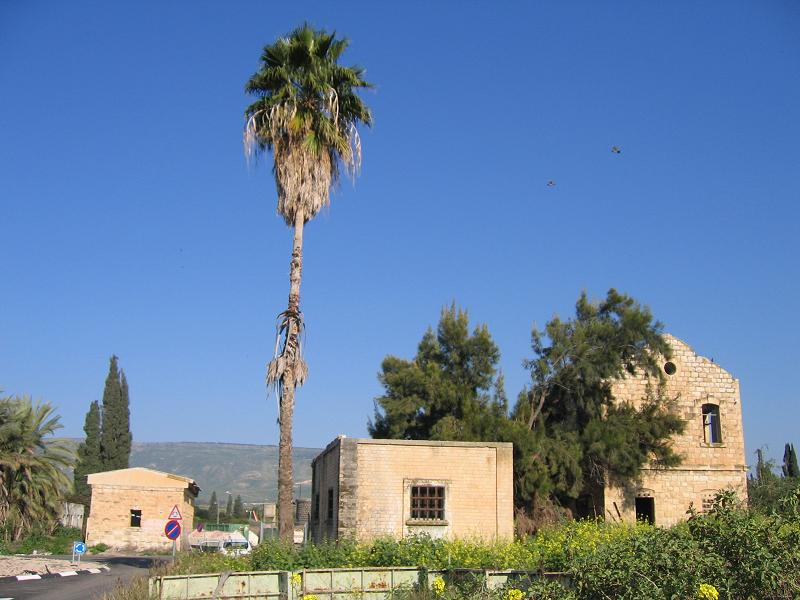
Samakh station on the former Jezreel Valley line, disused since the 1948 Israeli-Arab War

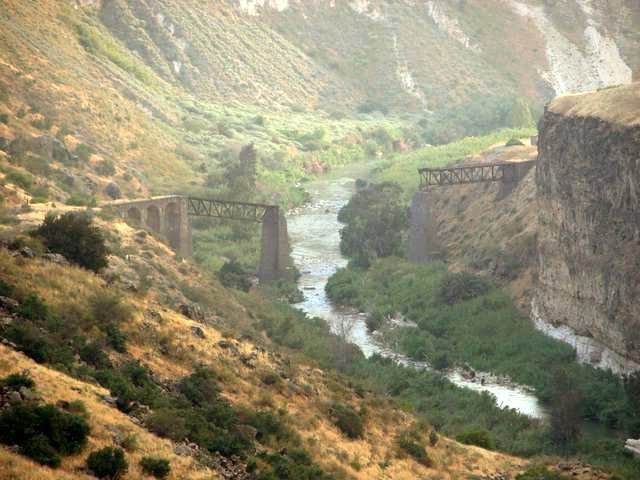
Yarmuk Bridge on the Jezreel Valley line, still in ruins many years after Palmach saboteurs destroyed it on the Night of the Bridges

By the time the British withdrew from the Mandate in May 1948, railway operations had effectively ceased. For the remainder of 1948 railway services in the new State of Israel were confined to the area around Haifa, running southwards on the main line as far as Hadera and northwards to Kiryat Motzkin and later Nahariya.

In the centre of the country, the populations of Ramla on the Jaffa – Jerusalem line and Lydda where this line joined the Haifa – El Kantara main line had large Arab majorities, who blocked Israelis from using railways or roads through this key area. One of the few train movements here after the British withdrawal was in July 1948 when Israeli forces launched Operation Danny to expel the Arab populations of Lydda and Ramla. When the Arab defenders blockaded the railway to help defend Lydda, an Israeli force reportedly used S100 0-6-0T number 21 as a battering ram to breach the fortifications. Although Operation Danny succeeded in forcing at least 50,000 Arab residents to leave Lydda and Ramla, the military situation between Ramla and Jerusalem still prevented the restoration of regular trains on that line until March 1950.

In the south of the country the rail link with Sinai and Egypt was fought over. Israelis ambushed an Egyptian troop train near Rafah, derailing it and inflicting many casualties.

Israeli forces secured nearly all of the Haifa – Ashkelon section of the Haifa – El Kantara main line. However, a short stretch of the Eastern Railway through Tulkarm was held by Jordanian forces and the 1949 Armistice Agreements made this front line part of the Armistice Line between Israeli- and Jordanian-controlled territory. In August 1948, Israel bypassed Tulkarm with a short stretch of new track just west of what was to become the Armistice Line.

The Armistice Line between Israel and Syria left the Haifa – Samakh section of the 1050mm gauge Jezreel Valley line in Israeli-controlled territory. Israel Railways continued using parts of this route on an irregular basis until the early 1950s at which point the entire line was abandoned as it was the only narrow gauge line left in the Israeli network. In 2011–2016 the section between Haifa and Beit She'an was rebuilt in standard gauge along roughly the same route as the Ottoman era one, although the rest of the route along the Jordan River from Beit She'an to Samakh remains dismantled and has not been reopened.

=== Later implementations of the Pole committee recommendations ===
The 1935 Pole committee's proposals were eventually realized, in modified form, decades after Palestine Railways' demise. In the early 1950s Israel Railways finally connected Tel Aviv to Haifa using two northern routes: First through a link to the Eastern Railway via the Bnei Brak railway station and later through a new coastal railway to Hadera where it linked up with the existing line to Haifa. These links however served the new Tel Aviv Central Station and were only connected to the Jaffa-Lydda-Jerusalem railway through the Eastern Railway, essentially the same indirect route used by Palestine Railways, until 1993 when the Ayalon Railway was constructed through the center of Tel Aviv. The railway junction in Niana, now called Na'an, was built, but rather than serving a line to Rehovot and Rishon LeZion, it served a rebuilt Railway to Beersheba. In 2013, Israel Railways opened a new rail line to Ashdod via the southern Tel Aviv suburbs of Rishon LeZion and Yavne, followed by an extension of the Lod-Ashkelon railway to Beersheba via Sderot, Netivot and Ofakim two years later, finally creating a southbound rail route that bypasses Lydda (now called Lod).

== Current status ==
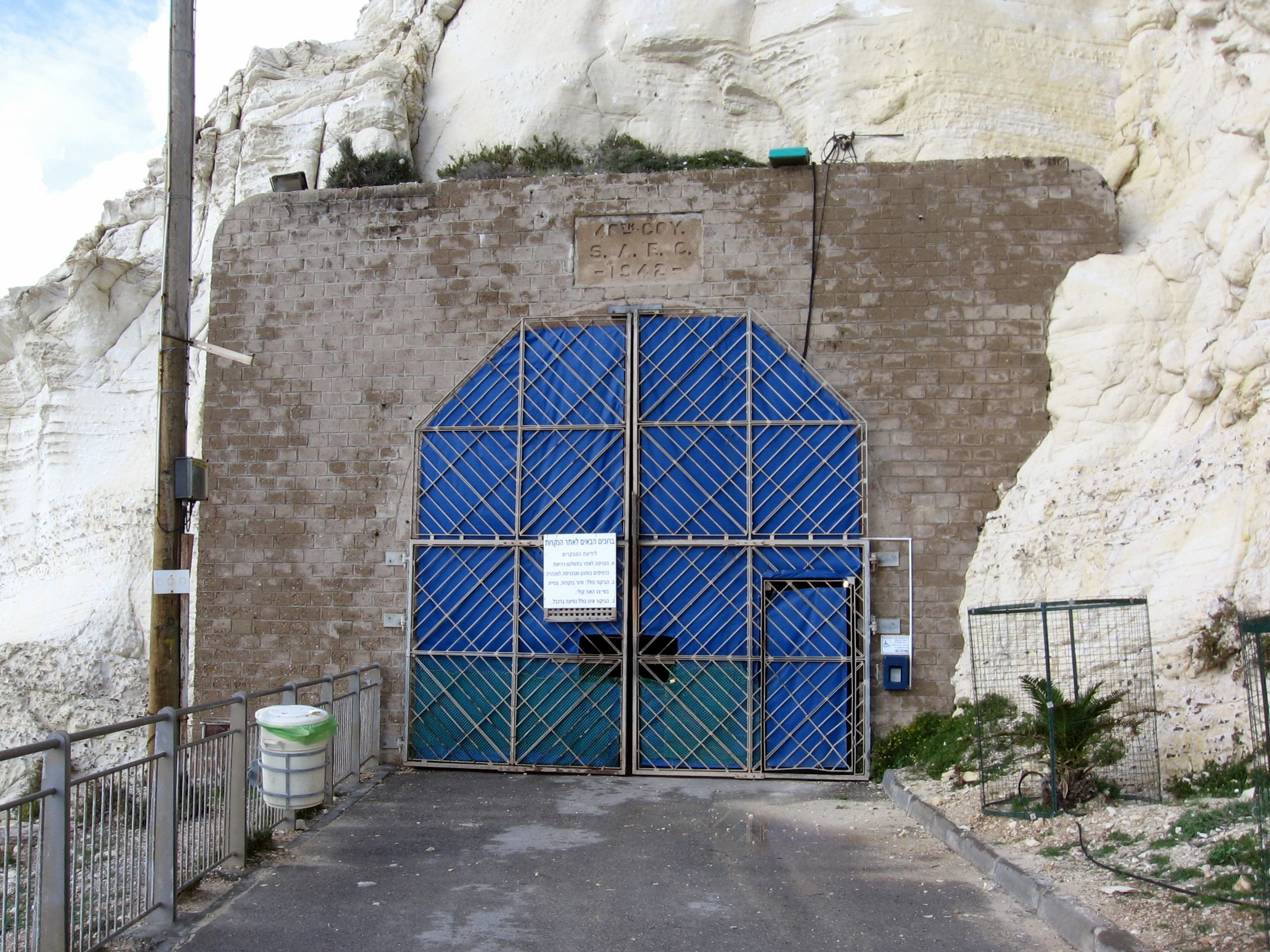
South portal of Rosh HaNikra Tunnel on the now-disused section of the HBT between Israel and Lebanon. An inscription over the portal commemorates its completion by South African Army engineers in 1942.

The former Palestine Railways are currently in three parts:

- Egypt: slowly being rebuilt by Egyptian National Railways.
- Palestine: in the Gaza Strip and West Bank, disused and mostly dismantled.
- Israel: operated by Israel Railways and being expanded.

The HBT Railway is mostly dismantled except for the short section between Haifa and Nahariya (nearby Az-Zeeb). This section has also been double tracked by Israel Railways. As the area north of Nahariya the HBT railway passes through is now a national park, Israel Railway's tenative plans for a new railway to Lebanon foresee a new railway to the east of the HBT railway, branching off the Acre-Karmiel railway at Ahihud.

=== Sinai railway restoration ===
Israel dismantled much of the railway in Sinai in the period between the Six-Day War and the Yom Kippur War, re-using most of the materials to build the Bar Lev Line fortifications along the Suez Canal. In the 21st century, starting from Egypt in the south, Egyptian National Railways opened the El Ferdan swing bridge on 14 November 2001, replacing a bridge destroyed in the Six-Day War in 1967. From El Ferdan, work then started on slowly rebuilding the former route to El Arish, with the possibility of renewing the rest of the route to Gaza. The project includes a branch line to Port Said Container Terminal. In December 2008 Google Earth showed progress with stations as far as Bir el-'Abd while some remnants of the old trackbed towards El Arish and Rafah are still visible. Later in the first decade of the 2000s, the rebuilt line in the Sinai became neglected, disused and overrun by sandstorms in many locations. In July 2012, the Egyptian transportation ministry declared its intention to restore the line to Bir el-'Abd. However, this was not carried out and a few years later the construction of the New Suez Canal had since completely disconnected the Sinai from the rest of Egypt’s rail network until a new rail bridge is built somewhere across the canal.

== Gallery ==
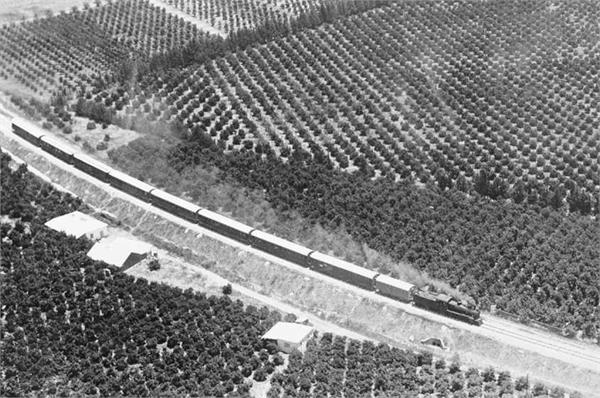
Train passing through Rehovot orchards 1939

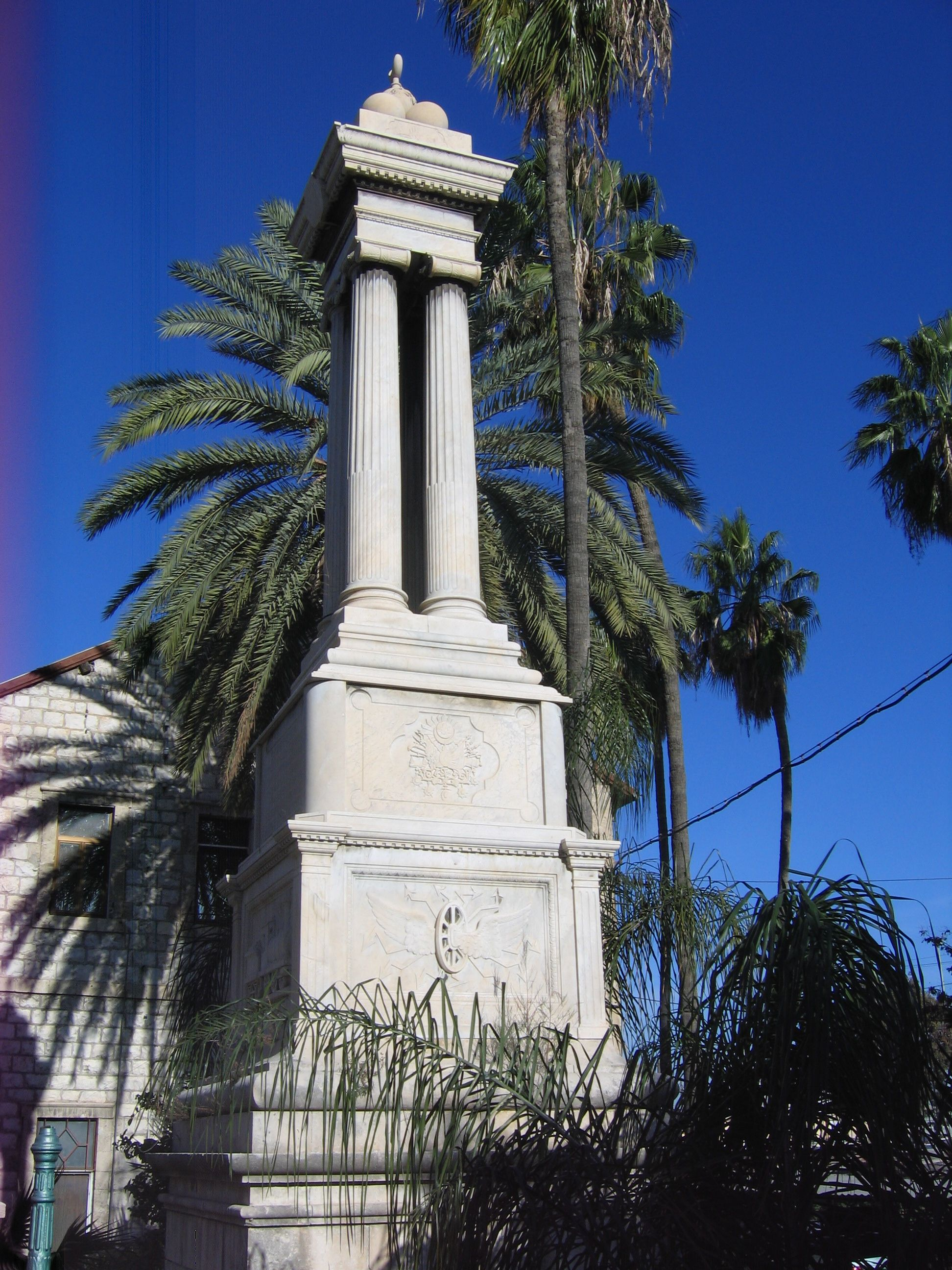
Ottoman monument outside Haifa East station erected in 1905 to commemorate the opening of the Jezreel Valley branch of the Hejaz Railway

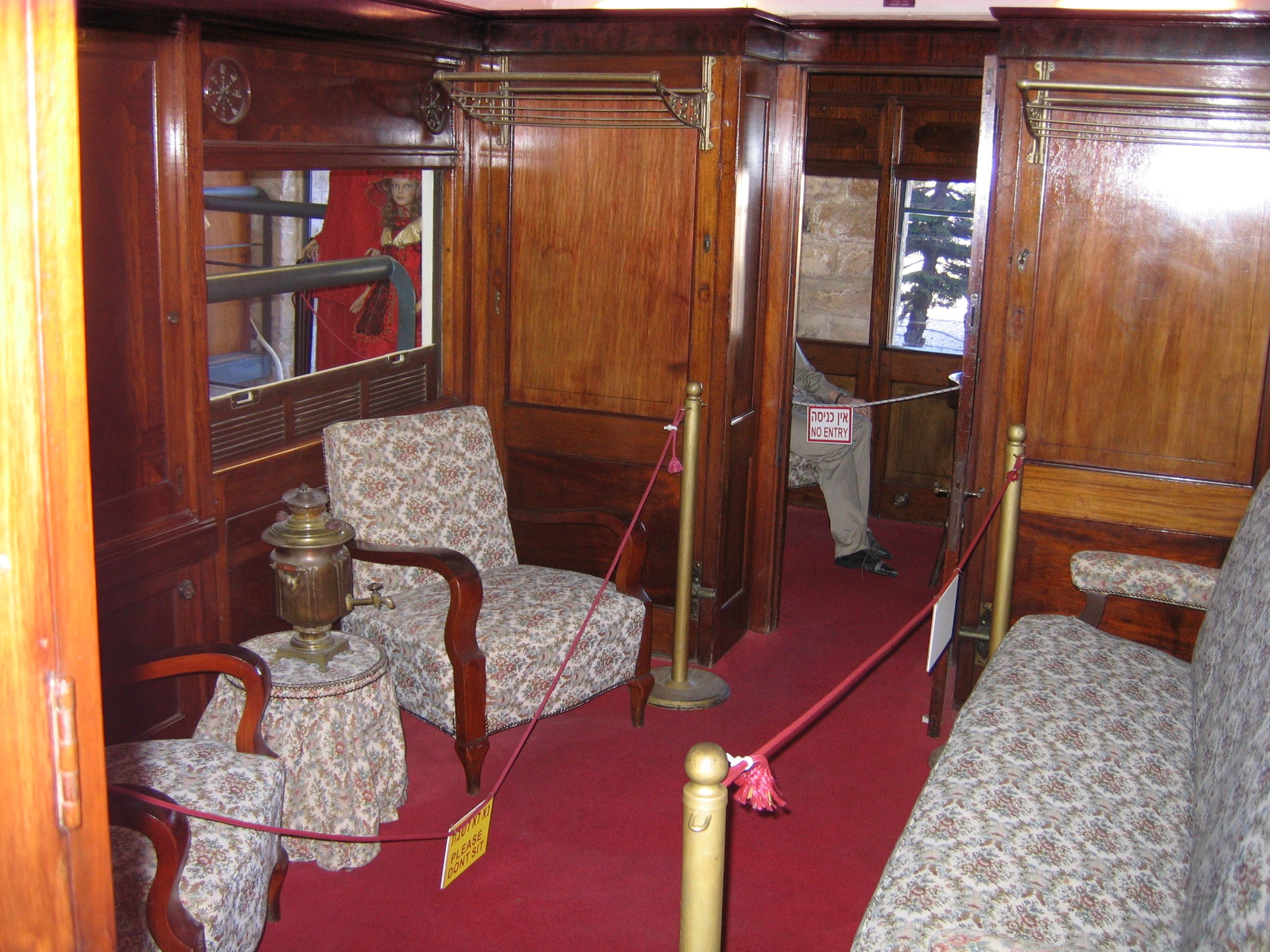
Compartment of BRCW saloon coach 98, built 1922, now preserved at the Israel Railway Museum

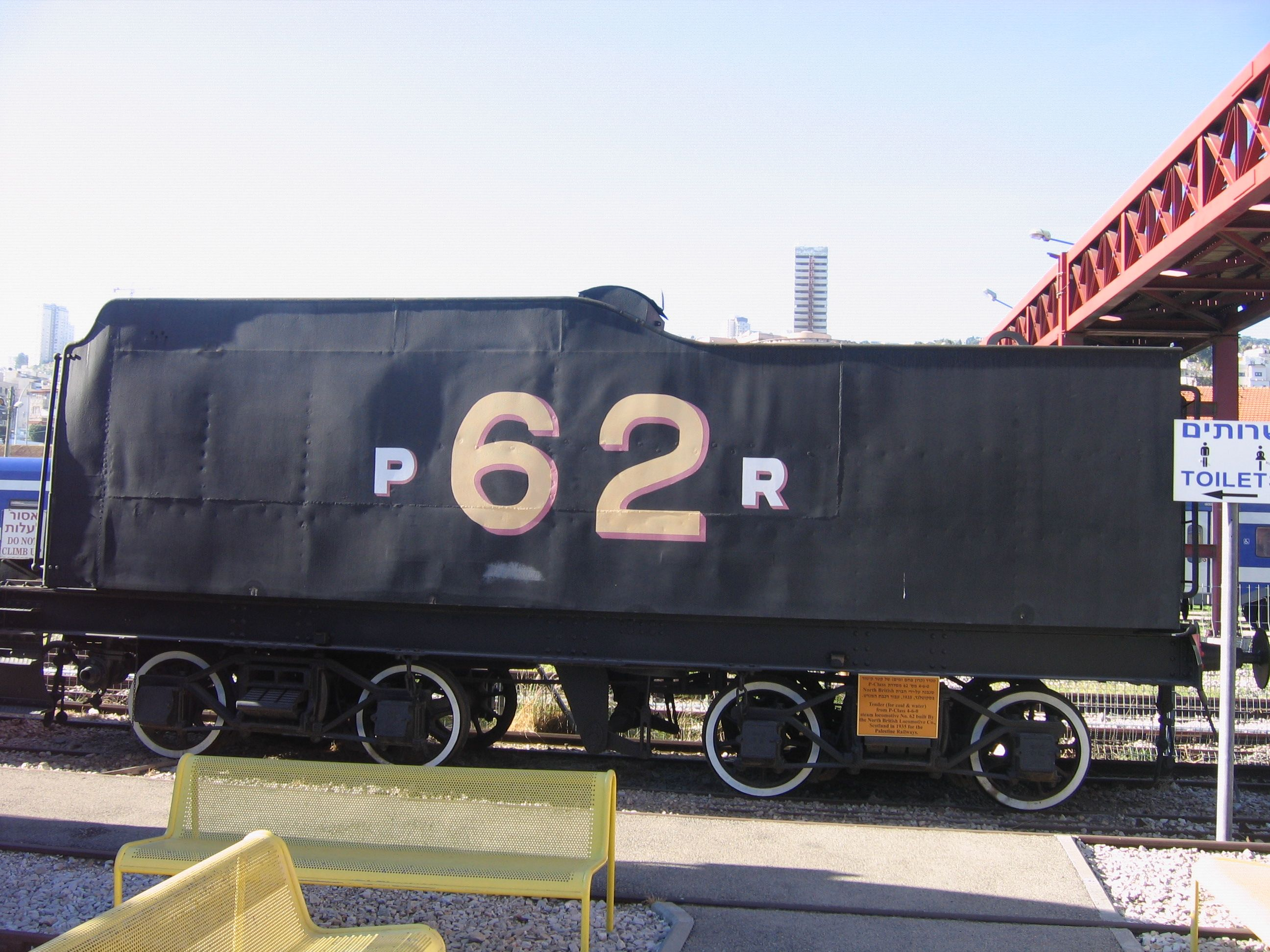
Tender of NBL 4-6-0 no. 62, built 1935, now preserved at the Israel Railway Museum

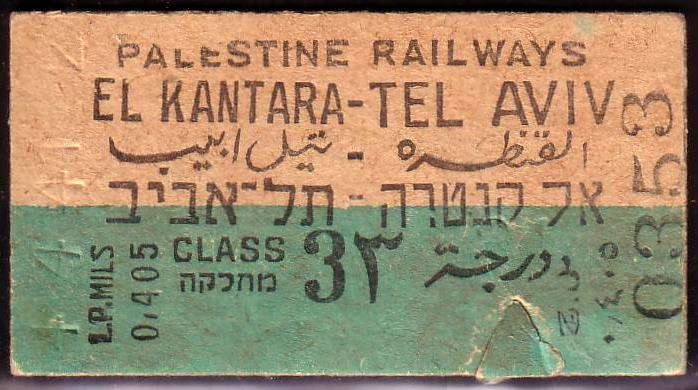
A ticket from El Qantara to Tel Aviv (1941)

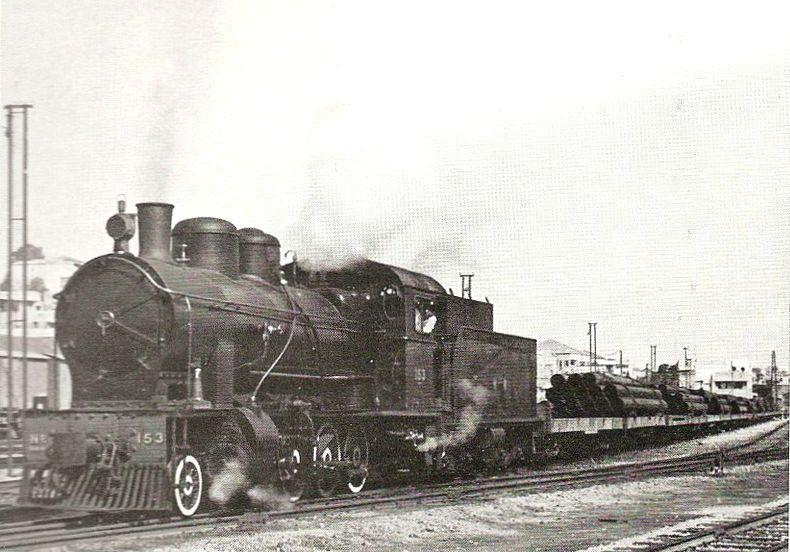
SLM in Switzerland built this 1050mm gauge 2-8-0 for the Hejaz Railway in 1912. It was originally numbered 90 and later renumbered 153. In 1927 it was transferred to Palestine Railways to work the Jezreel Valley railway. It is pictured here in 1946.

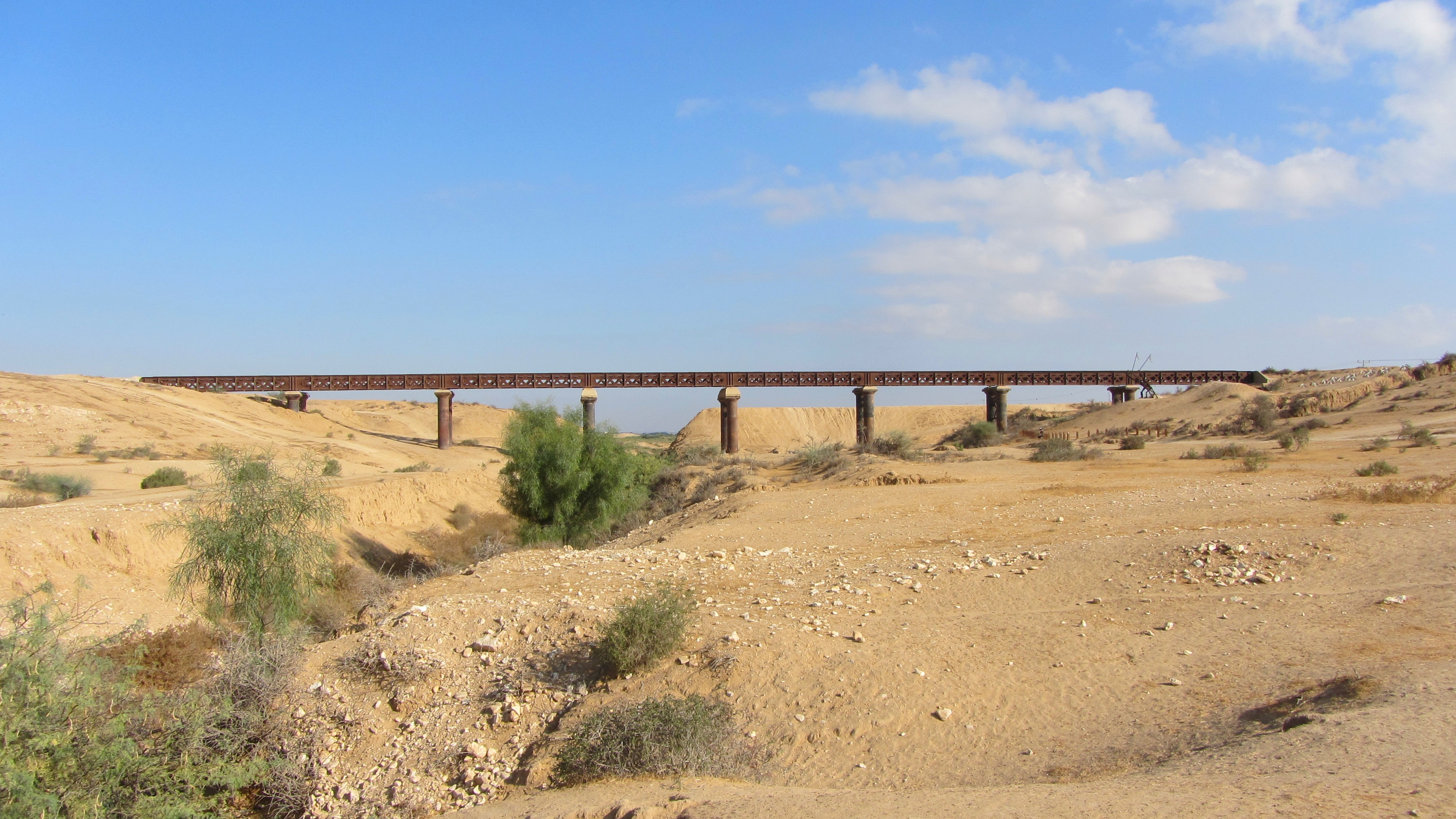
Railway bridge over Nahal Ofakim north of Beer-Sheba.

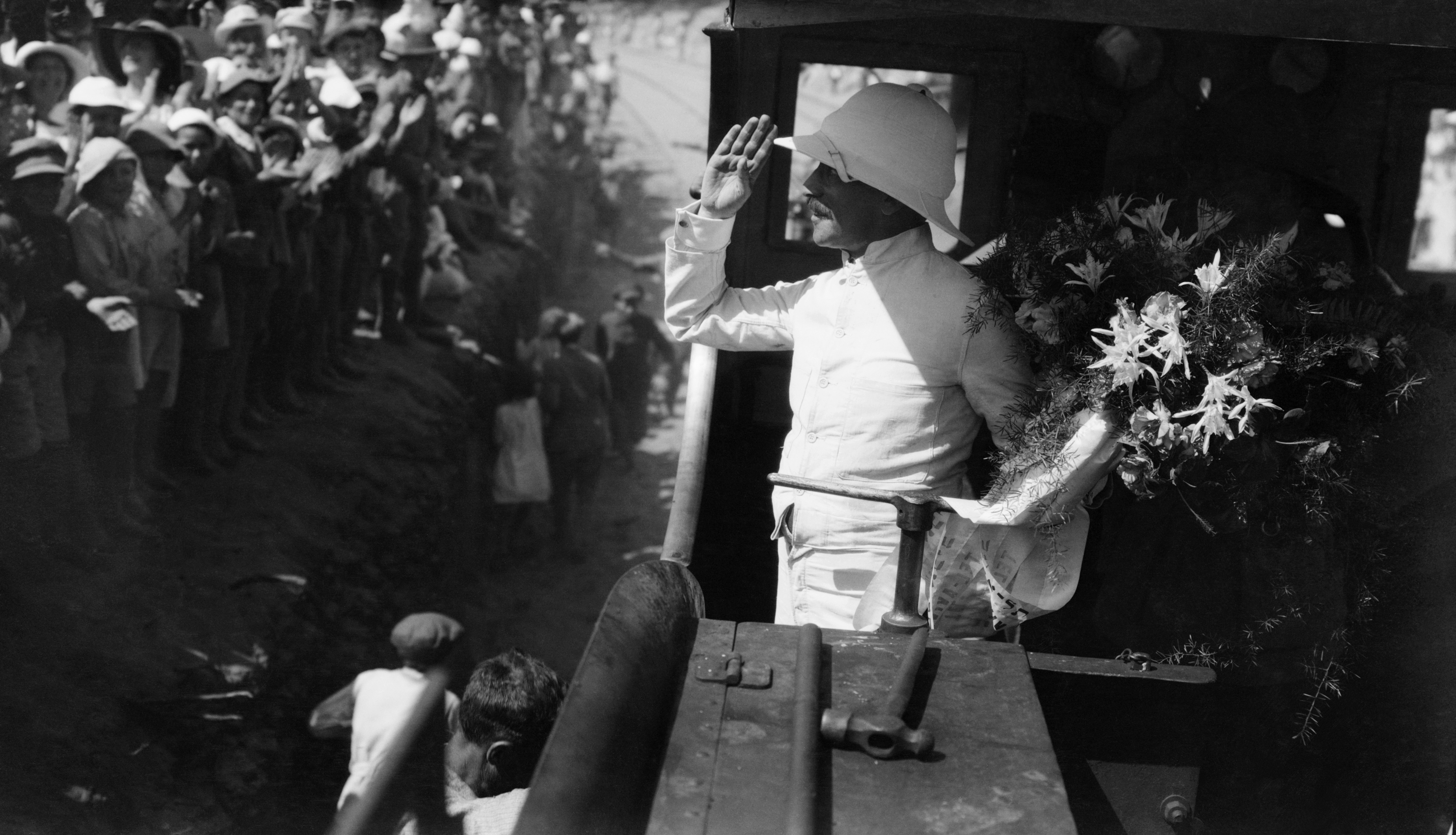
Sir Herbert Samuel, The first British High Commissioner for Palestine, at the ceremony to reopen the Jaffa – Jerusalem line in 1920 after it had been widened to standard gauge

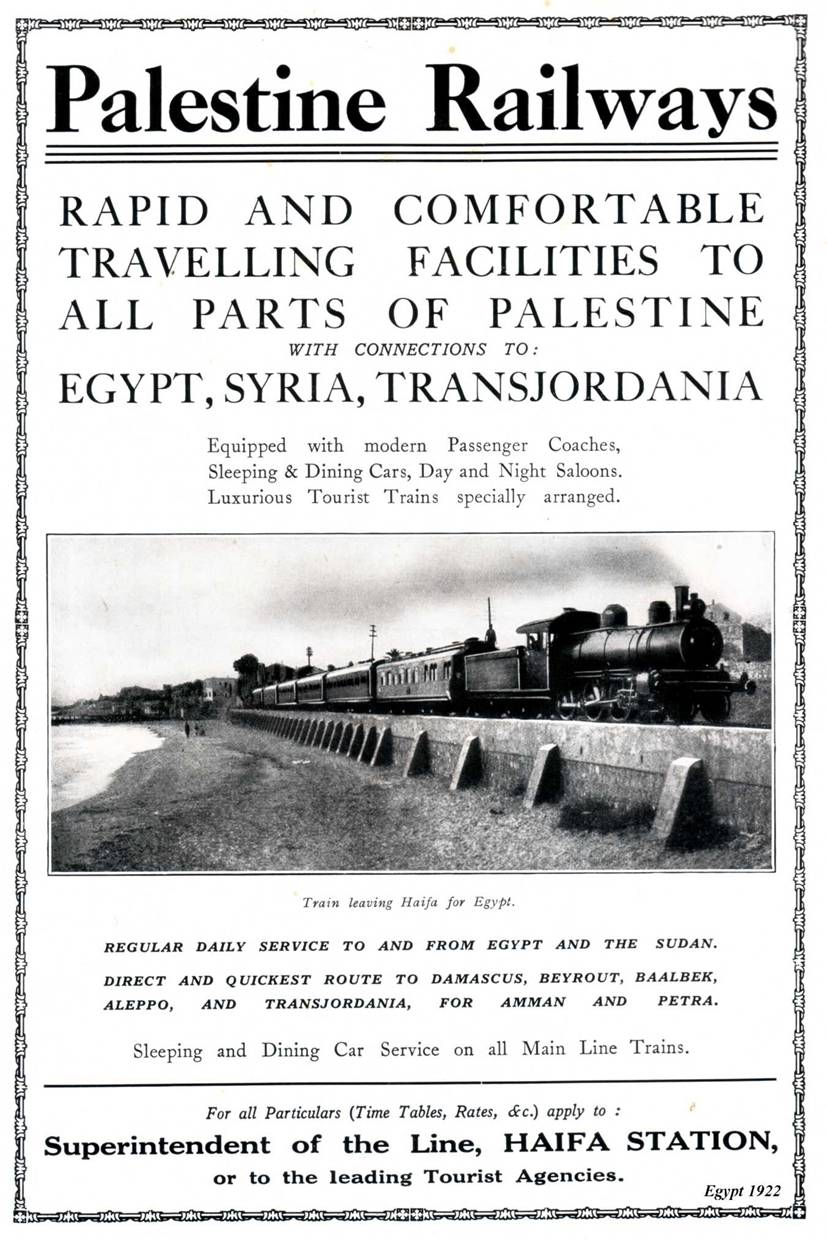
1922 passenger advertisement

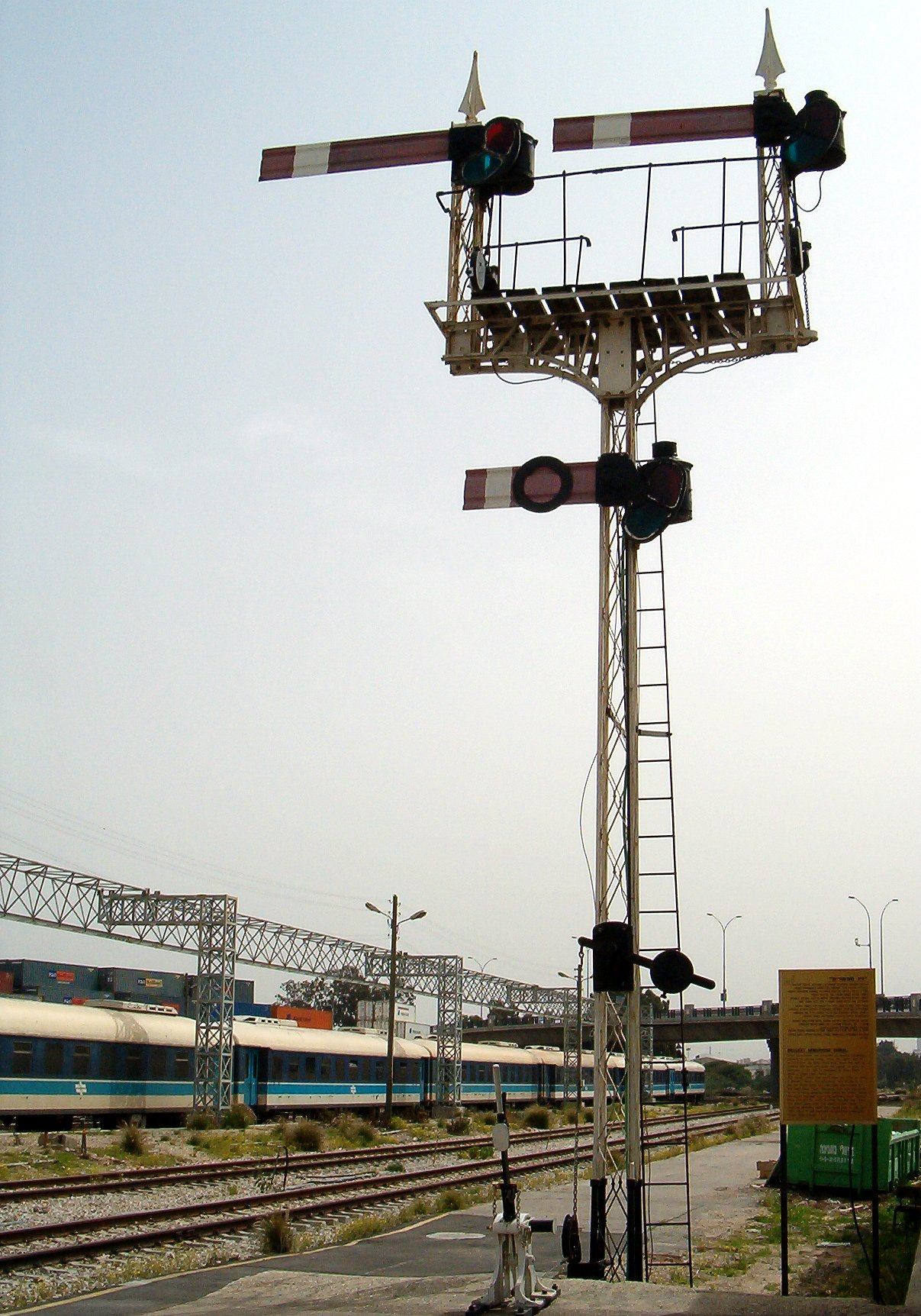
1930s Palestine Railways Semaphore signal at Haifa East, with shunting arm added by Israel Railways in the 1950s, now part of the Israel Railway Museum collection

== See also ==
- Baghdad Railway (built 1903-1940), initially a German-Ottoman project
- Narrow-gauge railway#Similar gauges
- Rail transport in Israel
- Transport in Jordan
