= Palestine Railways P class =

- P class 4-6-0 no. 60 on the turntable at Haifa in 1950
Type and origin
- Power type: steam
- Builder: North British Locomotive Company
- Serial number: 24219 – 24224
- Build date: 1935
- Total produced: 6
Specifications
- Configuration
  - Whyte: 4-6-0
- Gauge: 1,435 mm (4 ft 8 1/2 in) standard gauge
- Bogies: 6 ft 8 in (2,032 mm) wheelbase
- Leading dia.: 2 ft 9 in (838 mm)
- Driver dia.: 5 ft 6 3/4 in (1,695 mm)
- Wheelbase: 25 ft 11 in (7.90 m)
- Length: loco & tender 65 ft 6 in (19.96 m) over buffers
- Height: 14 ft 2 in (4.32 m)
- Axle load: 26 long tons (29.1 short tons; 26.4 t)
- Adhesive weight: 17 long tons (19.0 short tons; 17.3 t); 17 long tons (19.0 short tons; 17.3 t); 16.95 long tons (19.0 short tons; 17.2 t)
- Loco weight: 68.65 long tons (76.9 short tons; 69.8 t)
- Total weight: 127.5 long tons (142.8 short tons; 129.5 t) laden
- Fuel type: originally Welsh coal; converted to oil by 1943
- Fuel capacity: 1,193 imperial gallons (1,433 US gal; 5,420 L) (after conversion to oil fuel)
- Water cap.: 6,500 imperial gallons (7,800 US gal; 30,000 L)
- Firebox
  - Grate area: 29 square feet (2.7 m^{2})
- Boiler pressure: 190 lbf/in^{2} (1.31 MPa)
- Heating surface: 1,949 sq ft (181.1 m^{2})
- Cylinders: 2, outside
- Cylinder size: 20 1/2 in × 28 in (521 mm × 711 mm)
Performance figures
- Tractive effort: 28,470 lbf (126.6 kN)
Career
- Operators: Palestine Military Railway 1919–20; Palestine Railways 1920–48; Israel Railways 1948–60
- Class: P
- Number in class: 6
- Numbers: 60 – 65
- Locale: Mandate Palestine; northern Sinai; latterly Israel
- Delivered: 1935
- First run: 1935
- Last run: 1960
- Retired: 1960
- Scrapped: 1960
- Disposition: All scrapped (tender of No. 62 preserved)

The Palestine Railways P class was a type of standard gauge mixed traffic steam locomotive on Palestine Railways and its successor Israel Railways. The PMR introduced the class in 1935 and Israel Railways withdrew the last ones in 1960.

== Background ==
Palestine Railways was founded in 1920 to operate all railways in the League of Nations Mandate of Palestine. The mainstays of its locomotive fleet were its 50 H class 4-6-0s built by Baldwin in Pennsylvania in 1918, covering most duties on the main line between Haifa in Palestine and El Kantara East on the Suez Canal in Egypt via Lydda, Gaza and El Arish. Its daily Haifa – El Kantara through service was hardly an express, but it included two Wagons-Lits cars and early in the 1930s PR sought a more powerful locomotive to improve its performance.

== Characteristics ==
In 1935 PR bought six new 4-6-0 tender locomotives from the North British Locomotive Company in Glasgow, Scotland and designated them class P. These had a tractive effort of 28,470 lbf (126.6 kN): 16% more power than the 24,479 lbf (108.9 kN) of class H. Class P also had 5 ft 6 3/4 in (1,695 mm) driving wheels: a mixed-traffic diameter by British standards but 4 3/4 inches (120 mm) larger than those of the H class and therefore more suitable for higher speed traffic.

The locomotives were typically British in design but the tenders were not. Most tender locomotives in Britain had six-wheel tenders but PR opted for more American-style bogie tenders, reportedly to carry more water. However, PR's track was not the highest quality so the fact that bogie vehicles ride better and may be less prone to derailment may have been another factor.

In service all members of the class were painted black. From 1944 the number of each locomotive was painted in very large numerals on the side of its tender.

== World War II and after ==
PR had fuelled its locomotives with Welsh coal but in June 1940 Italy declared war on the Allies, making the Mediterranean extremely dangerous for British merchant shipping. PR therefore began converting its locomotives to burn oil, but it did not complete the conversion programme until 1943.

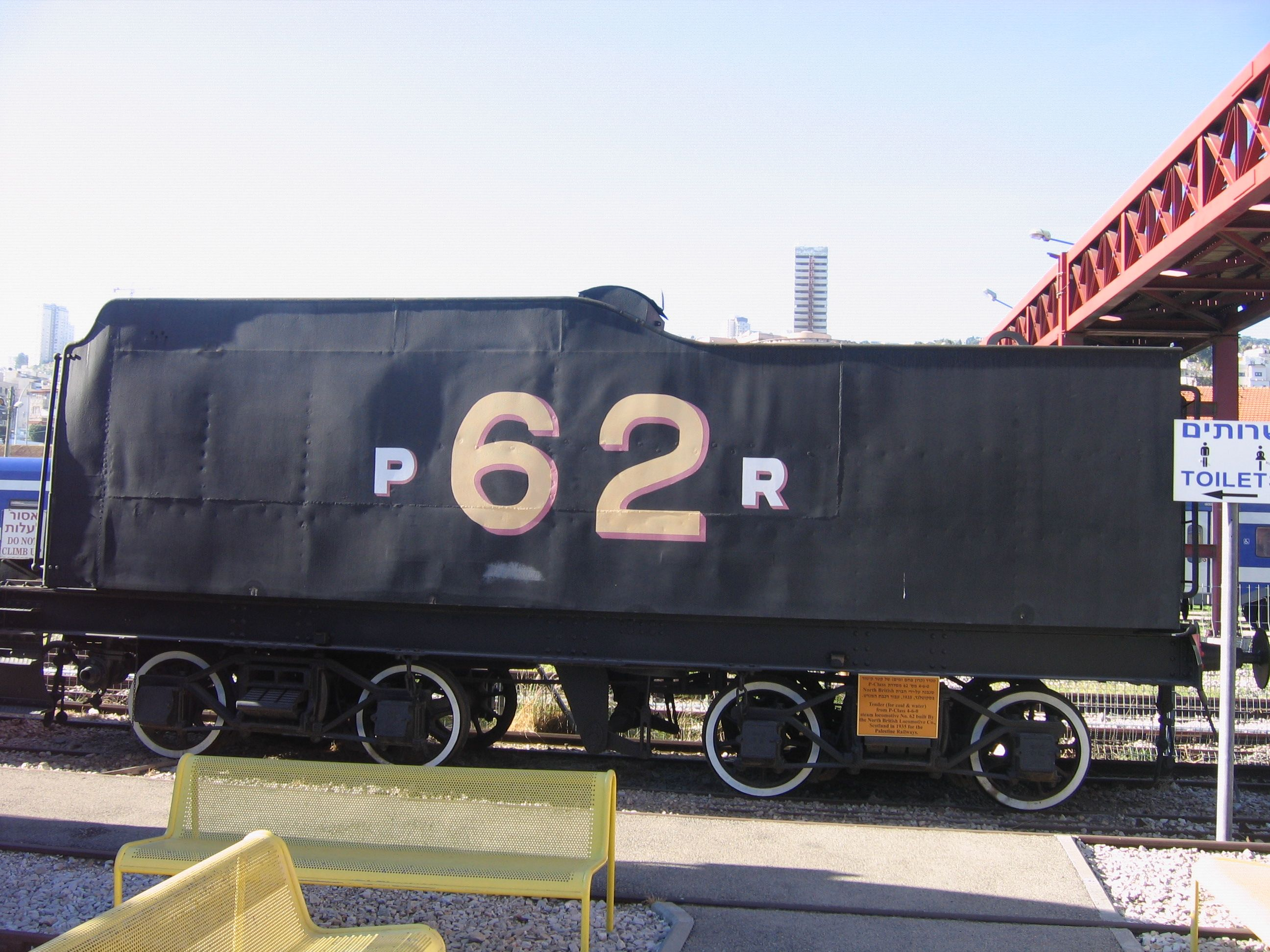
Tender of P class number 62, now preserved at the Israel Railway Museum

Palestine Railways was strategically important to the British Mandate authorities, so paramilitaries frequently attacked it during the 1936–1939 Arab revolt in Palestine and especially the 1946–48 1947–1949 Palestine war. El Kantara – Haifa trains were a particular target and Zionist paramilitaries bombed them three times during the 1947–1949 Palestine war. The P class survived these attacks and PR's Quishon workshops in Haifa managed to repair any damage.

After the UK withdrew from Mandate Palestine in May 1948, all six P class passed into Israel Railways stock. After the War of Independence and subsequent 1948 Arab–Israeli War, mainline services were truncated to the territory within the new State of Israel. By 1956 diesels had taken over the main line services and steam workings were largely confined to the central part of the country around Lod (formerly Lydda). The P class remained in service until the official end of steam on Israel Railways in 1959. All six were scrapped in about 1960 but the tender of number 62 is preserved at the Israel Railway Museum in Haifa.

== Sources ==
- Cotterell, Paul (1984). The Railways of Palestine and Israel. Abingdon: Tourret Publishing. ISBN 0-905878-04-3.
- Hughes, Hugh (1981). Middle East Railways. Harrow: Continental Railway Circle. ISBN 0-9503469-7-7.
- Proud, Peter; Smith, C, eds. (1946). The Standard Gauge Locomotives of the Egyptian State Railways and The Palestine Railways 1942–1945. London: Railway Correspondence & Travel Society. p. 7.
