= Israel Railway Museum =

Museum in Haifa, Israel

Coordinates: 32°48′40″N 35°00′24″E

- Company type: Museum
- Industry: Museum
- Founded: 1983
- Headquarters: Haifa, Israel
- Area served: Israel
- Key people: Paul Cotterell (Curator)
- Parent: Israel Railways
- Website: www.rail.co.il?page=museum

Israel Railway Museum (Hebrew: מוזיאון רכבת ישראל) is the national railway museum of Israel, located in Haifa. The railway museum is owned by Israel Railways and is located at the Haifa East Railway Station which nowadays no longer serves passengers.

== Features ==
The museum features the railway history of Israel, its predecessor states and neighbouring countries back to 1892. The location itself is an attraction, as it was the shed for the Jezreel Valley branch of the former Hejaz Railway. The museum features a collection of rolling stock, signs, tickets and other items. The museum has both an indoor and an outdoor section, with the indoor section having been renovated in 2000.

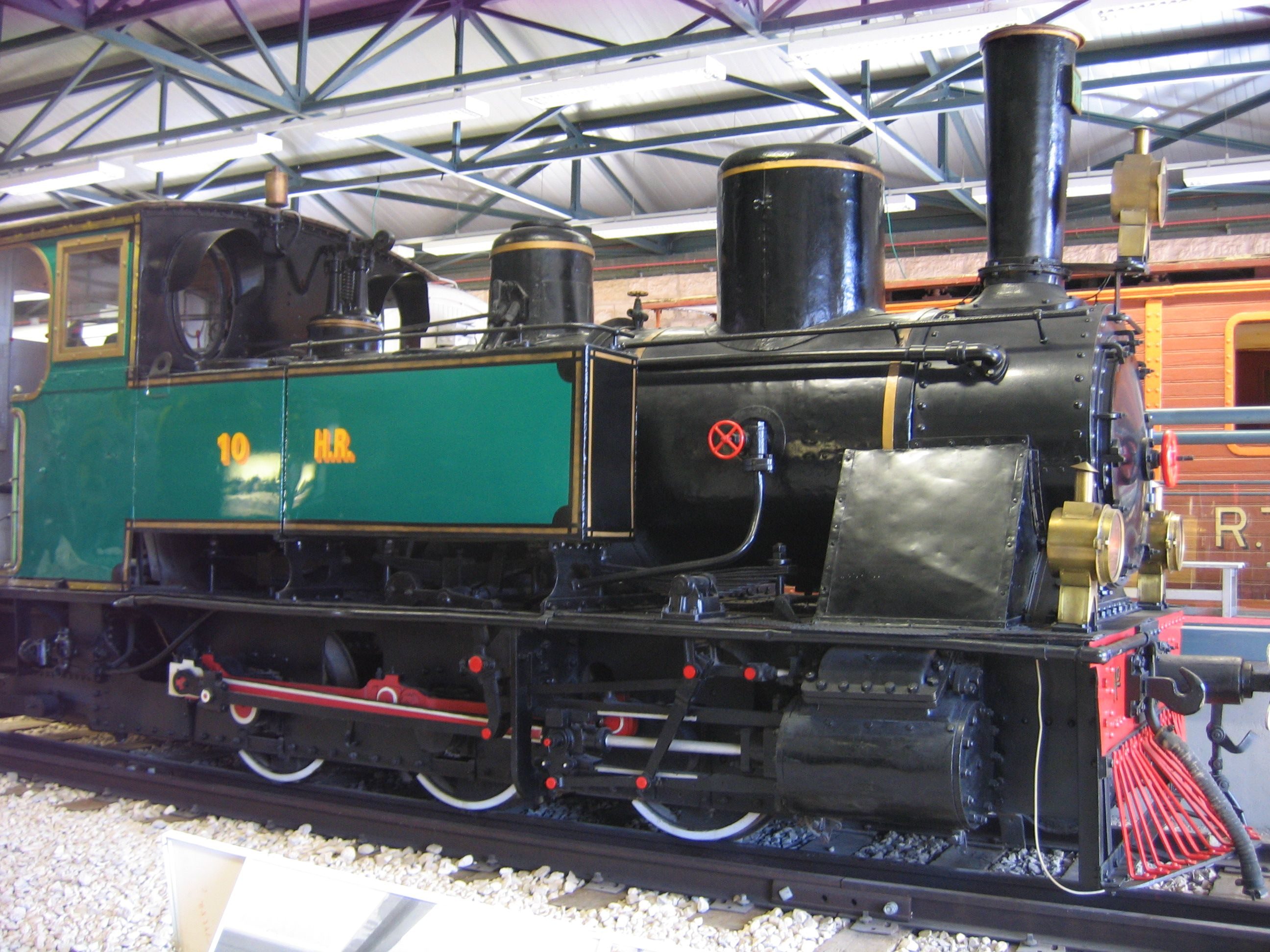
Hejaz Railway locomotive No. 10

=== Some notable exhibits ===
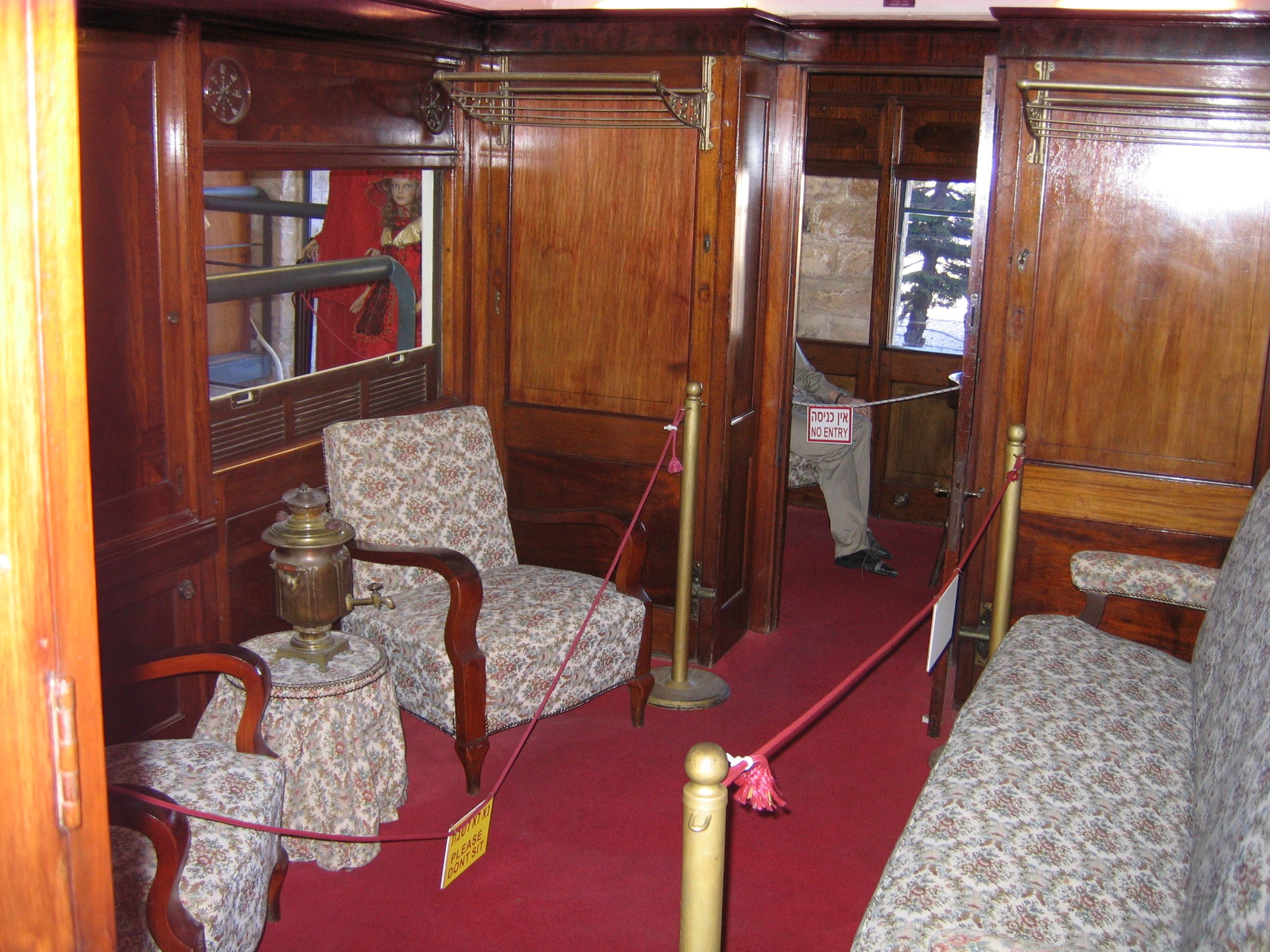
A compartment inside saloon coach No. 98

- Palestine Railways saloon coach No. 98, built by the Birmingham Railway Carriage and Wagon Company in England in 1922. It provided VIP transport for, among others, Emperor Haile Selassie of Ethiopia, Queen Elizabeth of Belgium and Sir Winston Churchill.
- Coach No. 4720 was built in Belgium in about 1893 for Egyptian State Railways. In World War I it was converted into an ambulance coach for the Egyptian Expeditionary Force's Sinai Military Railway. In the 1956 Israeli invasion of Sinai it was captured and transferred to Israel Railways who used it on breakdown trains.
- Hejaz Railway tank locomotive. It is a 1,050 mm (3 ft 5 11/32 in) 0-6-0T shunter built by Krauss in Germany in 1902.
- Tender of Palestine Railways P class locomotive No. 62, built in 1935 by the North British Locomotive Company in Scotland. The locomotive was one of a class of six 4-6-0 tender locomotives that hauled main line trains between Haifa and Kantara East on the Suez Canal via Lydda and El Arish. In 1960 all remaining standard gauge steam locomotives in Israel were scrapped after they had been replaced by diesel trains.
- Steam crane no. C-25-1, built in 1918 by Cowans, Sheldon and Company in England for the Railway Operating Division of the Royal Engineers.
- Steam crane no. C-30-1, built in 1950 for Egyptian State Railways and captured during the 1956 Israeli invasion of Sinai
- EMD G12 1,425 bhp Bo-Bo diesel-electric locomotive no. 107, built in 1954.
- EMD G16 1,950 bhp Co-Co diesel electric no. 163, built for Egyptian Railways in 1961 (ER fleet no. 3361), captured during the 1967 Israeli invasion of Sinai and transferred by Israel Railways to work on freight lines in the Negev desert.

== Opening hours ==
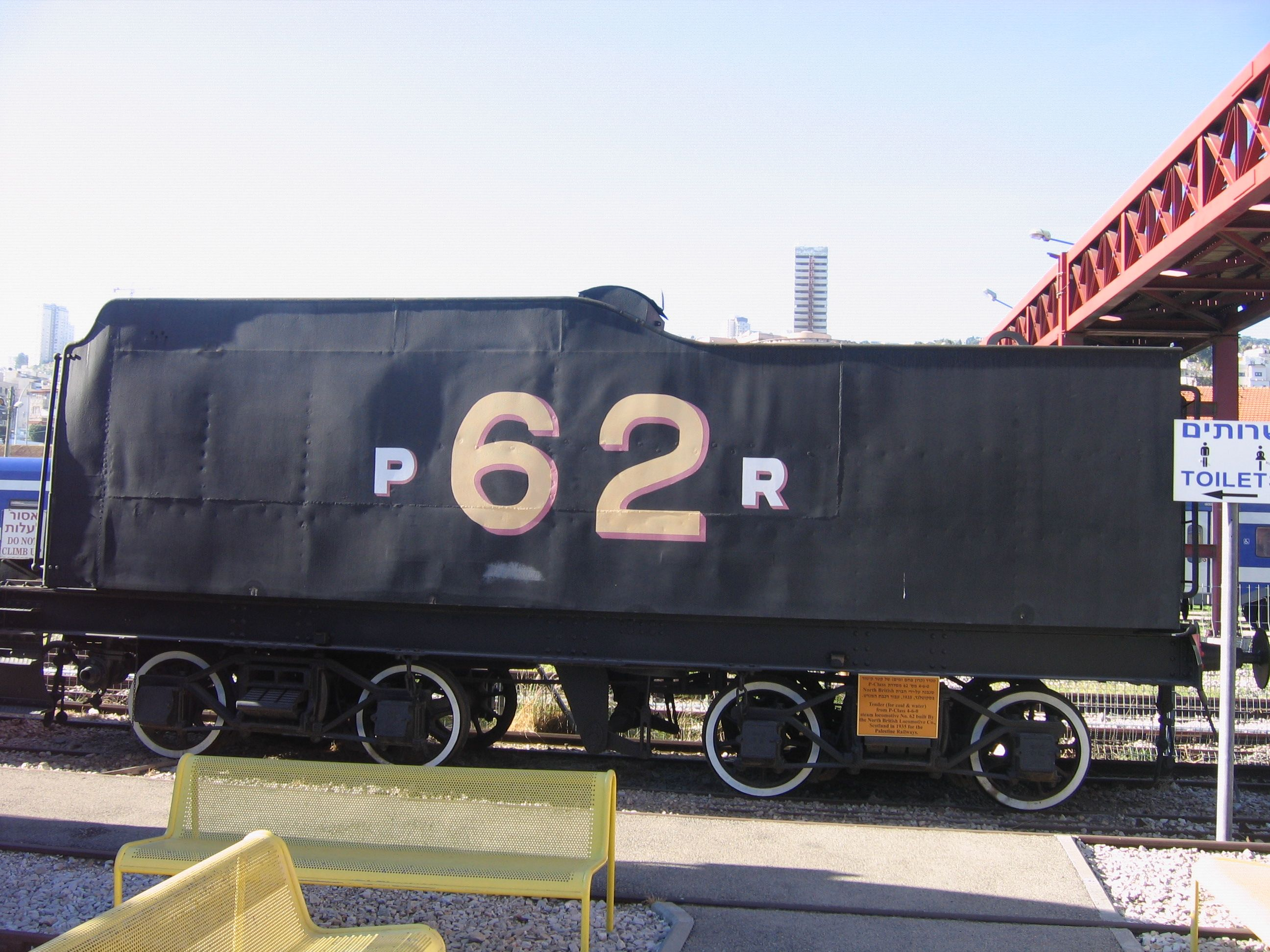
Tender of Palestine Railways P class 4-6-0 steam locomotive No. 62

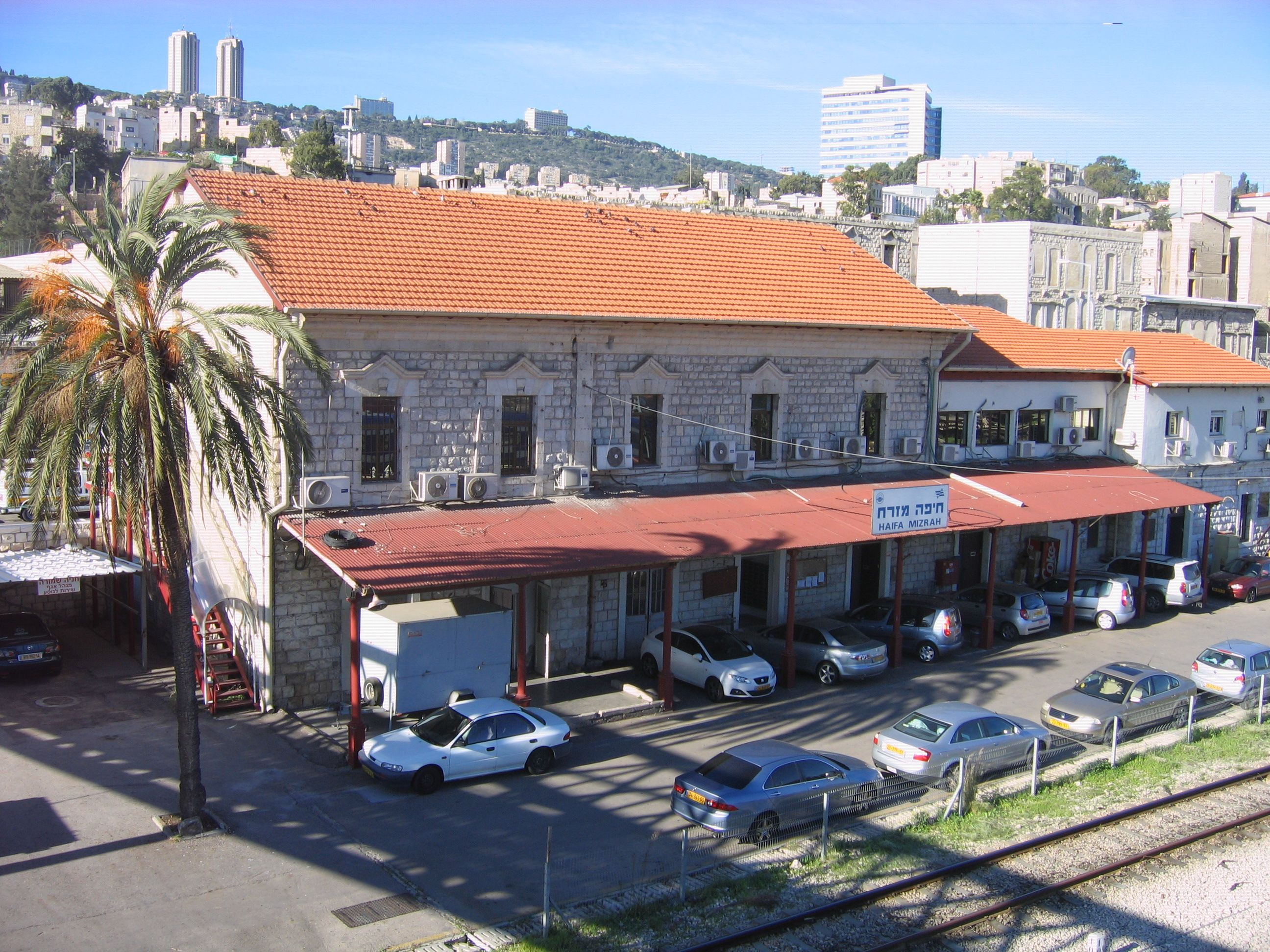
Part of the preserved Haifa East station building at the museum

The museum is open Sunday to Thursday from 8:30 to 15:30. Payment is available by cash or credit card at the door.

The museum is at Haifa East railway station but passenger trains do not stop there. However, by prior arrangement with the museum manager, groups of 25 people or more who are visiting the Railway Museum may arrange for an intercity train to stop at Haifa East.

== See also ==
- List of railway museums
- List of transport museums

== Sources ==
- Cotterell, Paul (1984). The Railways of Palestine and Israel. Abingdon: Tourret Publishing]. ISBN 0-905878-04-3.
