= Mustafa Kemal Atatürk Memorial, Beersheba =

Monument next to the Turkish Soldiers Monument

Mustafa Kemal Atatürk Memorial
- Atatürk Anıtı
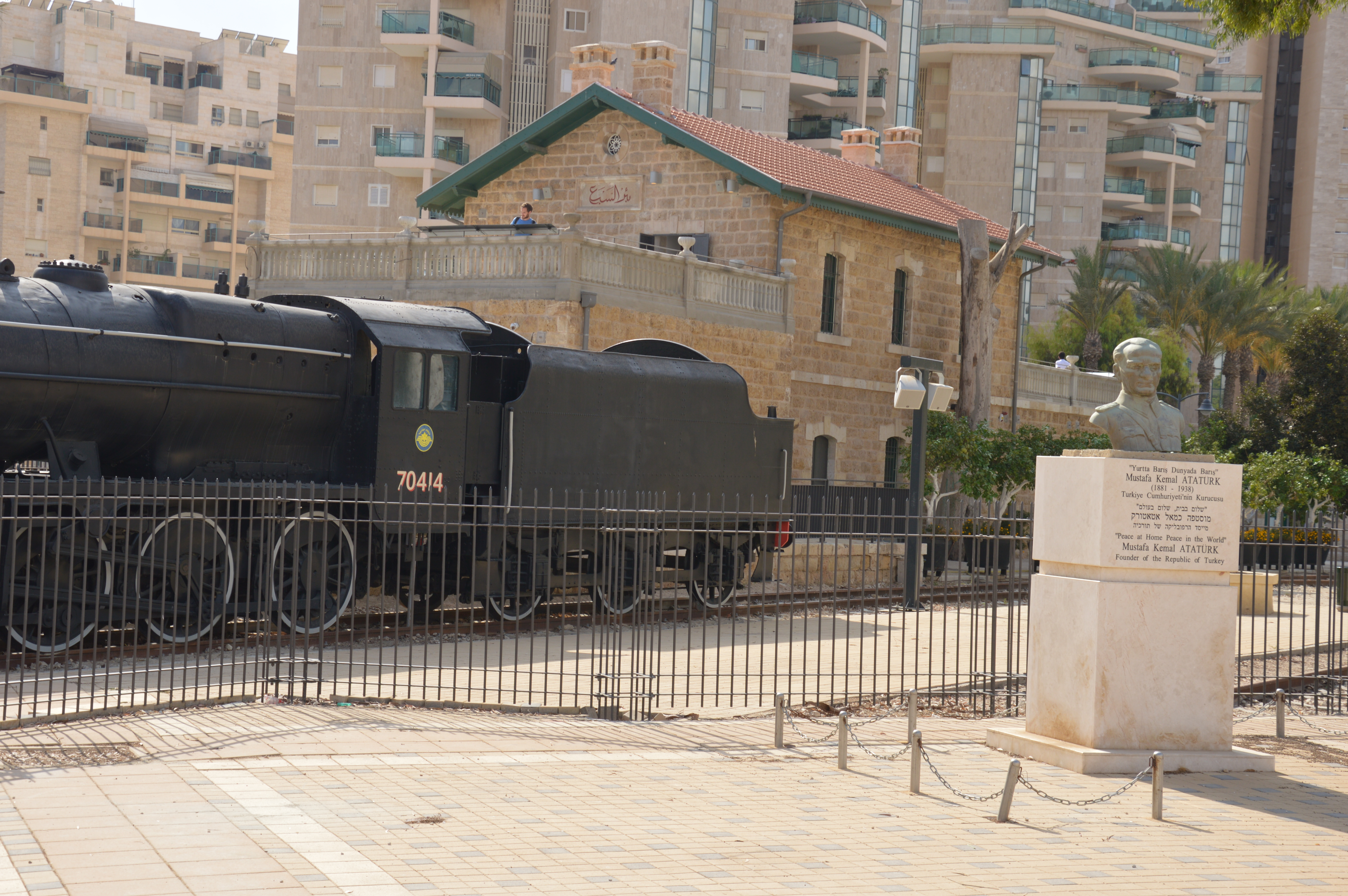
- Mustafa Kemal Atatürk Memorial next to the Turkish railway station in Beersheba
- Interactive map of Mustafa Kemal Atatürk Memorial
- Location: Mustafa Kemal Atatürk Plaza
- Coordinates: 31°14′43.7″N 34°47′08.6″E
- Type: Memorial
- Opening date: 2008
- Dedicated to: Mustafa Kemal Atatürk

The Mustafa Kemal Atatürk Memorial is a monument near the Turkish Soldiers Monument in memory of the Ottoman soldiers who died during the Battle of Beersheba in Beersheba, Israel.

== History ==
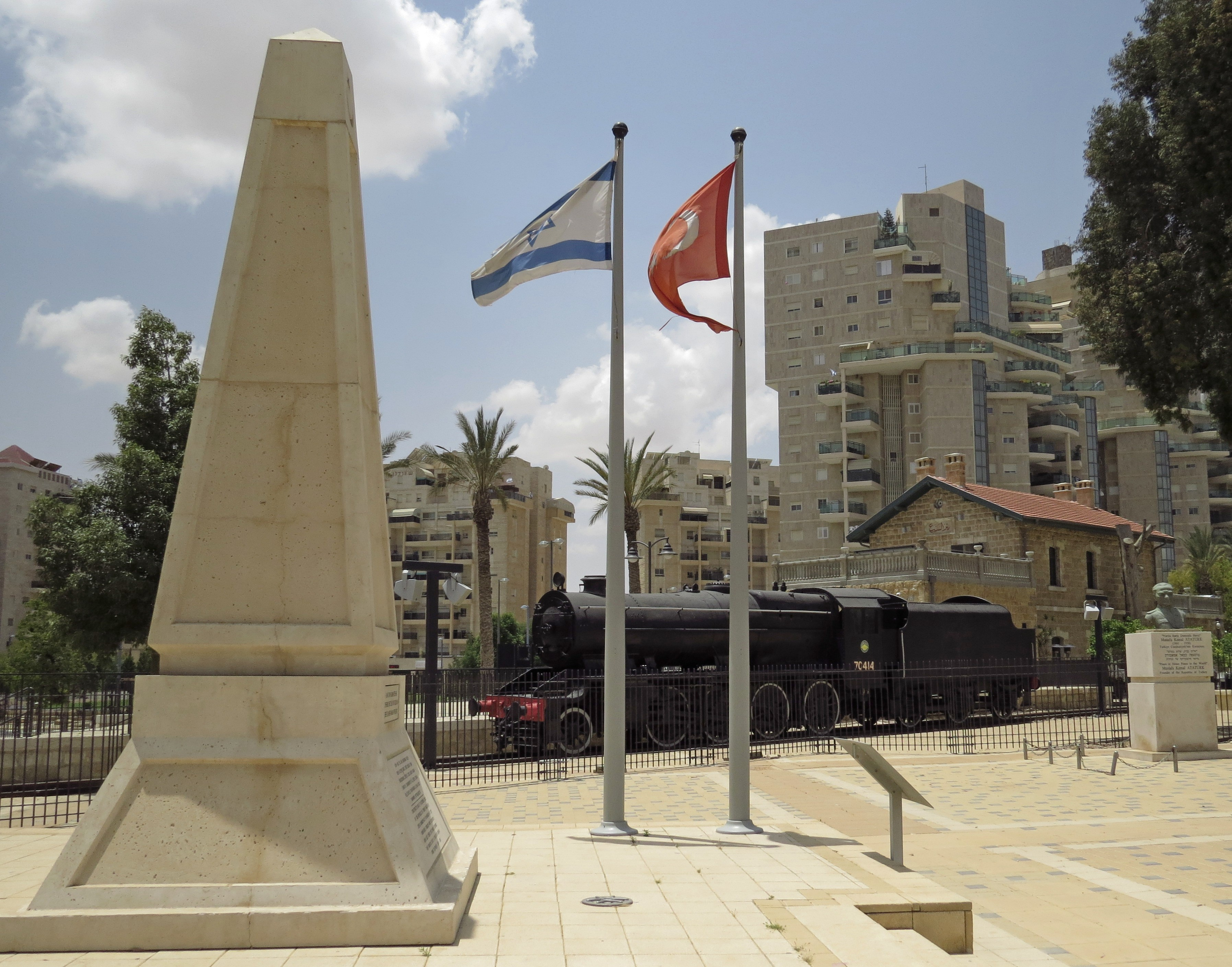
The Turkish Soldiers Monument and Atatürk Memorial

The monument is located between the David Tuviyahu Avenue and the Ali Daivis Street on Mustafa Kemal Atatürk Plaza across from another memorial which is dedicated to the Ottoman soldiers who fell in the Battle of Beersheba (1917). It is next to a memorial commemorating the Allied (Australian and New Zealand) soldiers.

The monument was unveiled in a ceremony in 2008. It was attended by Turkey's Tel Aviv ambassador Namık Tan and other embassy personnel and military attaches. Also the Beersheba mayor Yaakov Terner and the ambassadors of the United Kingdom, Australia, New Zealand, South Africa and many Turkish expatriates attended the ceremony. The ambassador expressed the importance of the Ottoman Empire in the history of Beersheba and that he was glad that the memorial had finally been realized.

== See also ==
- Beersheba Turkish railway station
