= TCDD 45151 Class =

Class of former WD Stanier 2-8-0 locomotives, acquired in 1941

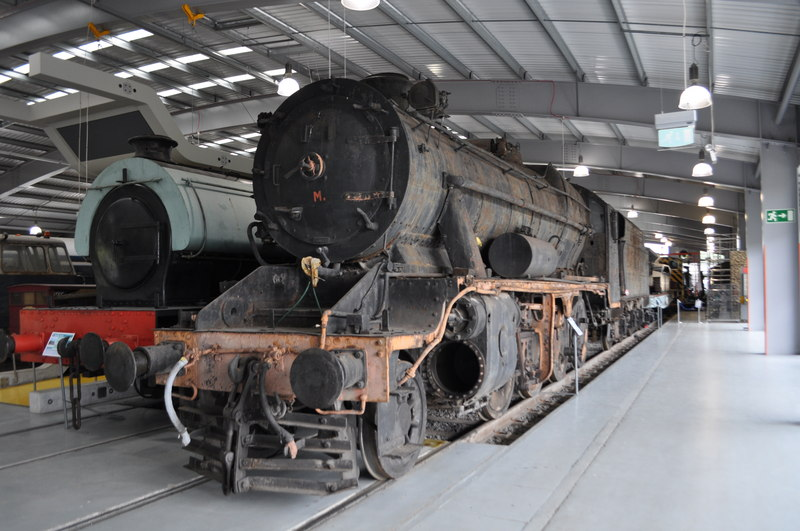

The TCDD (Turkish Republic Railways) 45151 Class is a class of 2-8-0 steam locomotives which were acquired from the British War Department to the LMS Stanier Class 8F design. They had a maximum speed of 43 miles per hour (70 km/h), much like their British counterparts.

== Background ==
On the outbreak of the Second World War British locomotive manufacturers could no longer supply an order for 2-10-0s similar to the TCDD 56001 Class, derived from the German BR 42, for TCDD at the original price and conditions. (These locomotives were eventually delivered after the war as the TCDD 56080 Class). However, Nazi Germany stepped in to offer neutral Turkey DRG BR 52-type Kriegsloks which became the 56501 Class. Diplomatically embarrassed, the British offered the Turks 25 of the LMS Stanier Class 8F 2-8-0s, which had been adopted by the War Department as their standard heavy freight locomotive.

The engines selected were built by the North British Locomotive Company of Glasgow. Originally intended for WD service but the Fall of France saw them earmarked for the LMS before they were diverted to Turkey.

== Shipping ==
The locomotives were shipped as a kit of parts (other 8Fs destined for the Middle East went complete) via the Cape of Good Hope and the Suez Canal since the Mediterranean was too dangerous for Allied shipping. Seven failed to complete the journey. The vessel transporting three of them, the SS Jessmore, was involved in a collision in the Atlantic with another ship in the convoy on 19 February 1941. The Jessmore sank with the loss of its cargo a few days later. Four more received the same watery fate when the MV Berhala was torpedoed by U-38 on 23 May 1941 off Freetown, Sierra Leone. The lost engines were:

WD No.	NBL Works No.	Built	Ship
343	24643	1940	SS Jessmore
344	24644	1940	SS Jessmore
345	24645	1940	SS Jessmore
338	24638	1940	MV Berhala
354	24654	1940	MV Berhala
355	24655	1941	MV Berhala
356	24656	1941	MV Berhala

== Service ==
The remaining 18 locomotives were transhipped at Port Said in Egypt and went overland to Turkey where they were renumbered 45151-68. Re-erection was in Sivas under the direction of R.G. Jarvis of the LMS. In 1943 they were joined by 2 more classmates, (45169/70) taking the class number to 20, in lieu of the lost engines. These were joined by a gift of 29 of the Lend-Lease S200 Class 2-8-2s which formed the TCDD 46201 Class.

WD No.	TCCD No.	NBL Works No.	Built	To Turkey	Image	Notes
524	45151	24672	1941	1941		
523	45152	24671	1941	1941		
357	45153	24657	1941	1941		
358	45154	24657	1941	1941		
359	45155	24657	1941	1941		Preserved
346	45156	24646	1940	1941		
351	45157	24651	1940	1941		
350	45158	24650	1940	1941		
349	45159	24649	1940	1941		
348	45160	24648	1940	1941		Preserved
522	45161	24670	1941	1941		Preserved
347	45162	24647	1940	1941		
339	45163	24639	1940	1941		
342	45164	24642	1940	1941		
353	45165	24653	1940	1941		Preserved
341	45166	24641	1940	1941		Preserved
352	45167	24652	1940	1941		
340	45168	24640	1940	1941		Preserved
552	45169	24749	1942	1943		
554	45170	24755	1942	1943		Preserved

Designed for British conditions, the 8Fs were not suited to Turkish circumstances. Though large for British engines, they were underpowered by Turkish standards and so could not ascend the steep grades unassisted. Their lack of drop grates also prevented them from long-distance working. They were thus relegated to shunting and local trip freights. The Turkish railwaymen referred to them as "Churchills" after British prime minister Winston Churchill.

The locomotives lasted into the 1980s where they became of special interest of British railway enthusiasts venturing abroad after the demise of steam in Britain.

== Preservation ==
Three of the Turkish 8Fs have been preserved. No. 45161 is a static exhibit at the Çamlık Railway Museum. 45168 is preserved and was seen on display at İzmit Station in September 2010. No. 45160 was repatriated to Great Britain in 1989 by the Churchill 8F Locomotive Company Limited where it is Operational on the Gloucestershire Warwickshire Railway.

In October 2010, two of the six remaining derelict examples in Turkey (45166 and 45170) were acquired by the three members of the Churchill 8F Locomotive Company Limited. The two locomotives travelled by rail from Sivas depot to İzmir where they were loaded onto a ship for transport back to the United Kingdom.

They arrived at Royal Portbury Dock on Boxing Day 2010 aboard the MV Grande Scandinavia (Grimaldi Group). The transportation of the locomotives across Turkey was the subject of an episode of the documentary television series Monster Moves in 2011.

45170 is currently stored in the Museum of Scottish Railways at the Bo'ness and Kinneil Railway awaiting restoration by the Scottish Railway Preservation Society.

45166 was sold to the municipality of Beersheba in Israel in December 2012, and has now been cosmetically restored and put on display at the Be'er Sheva Turkish Railway Station, where it bears the number 70414, a number shared by a scrapped classmate used by Israel Railways until 1958. The original 70414 was featured in a popular Hebrew song, originally written to accompany a 1958 short film about the last steam locomotive of Israel Railways, telling the story of its final journey from Beersheba to Israel Railways' workshops in Haifa Bay to be scrapped.

45165 is plinthed outside Sincan railway station.
