= Mustafa Kemal Atatürk Plaza =

Mustafa Kemal Atatürk Plaza may refer to:

- Mustafa Kemal Atatürk Plaza (Beersheba), a square on the Turkish railway station in Beersheba, Israel
- Mustafa Kemal Atatürk Plaza (Santiago), a square in Santiago, Chile
