= TCDD 56501 Class =

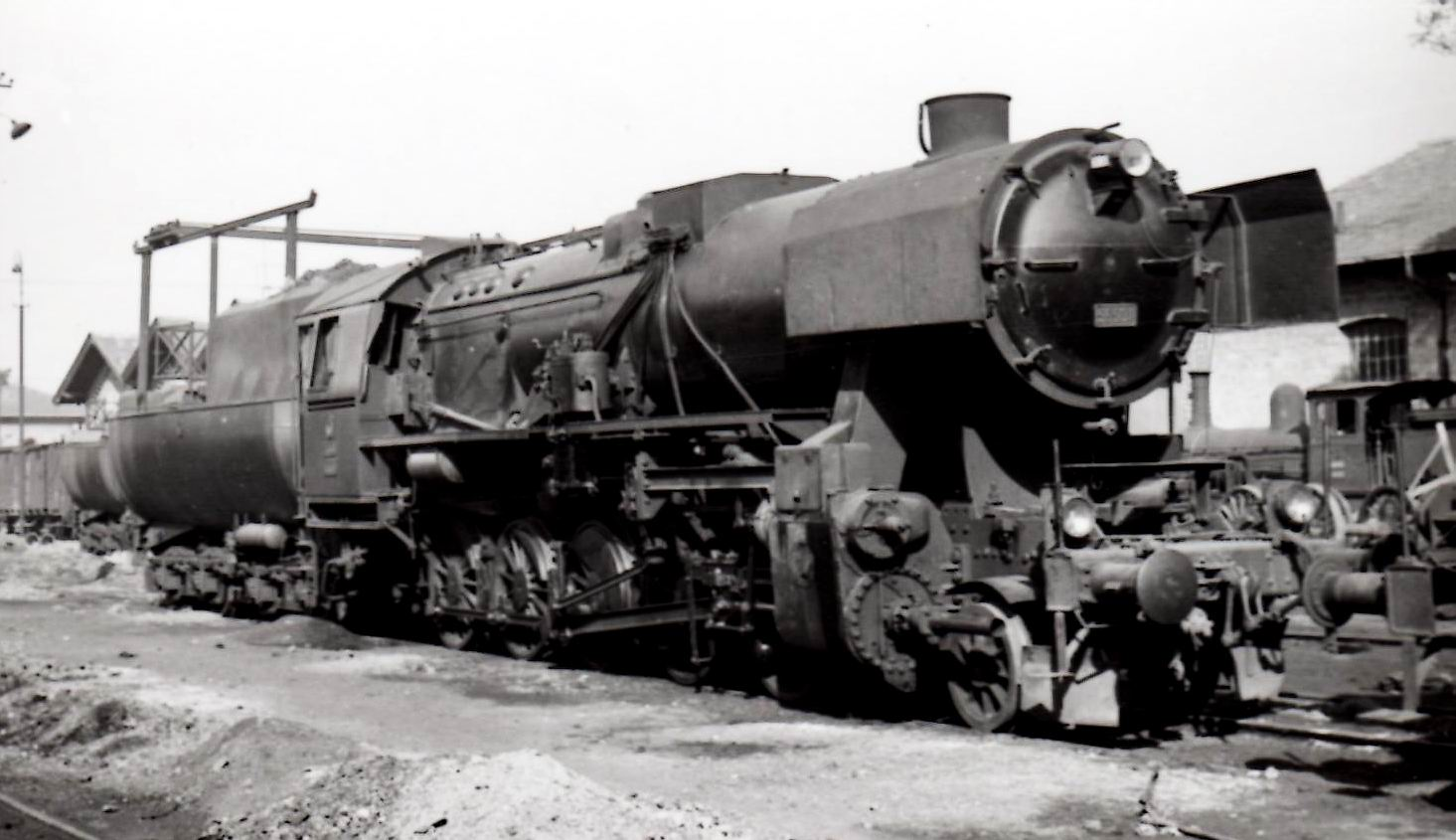
TCDD 56501

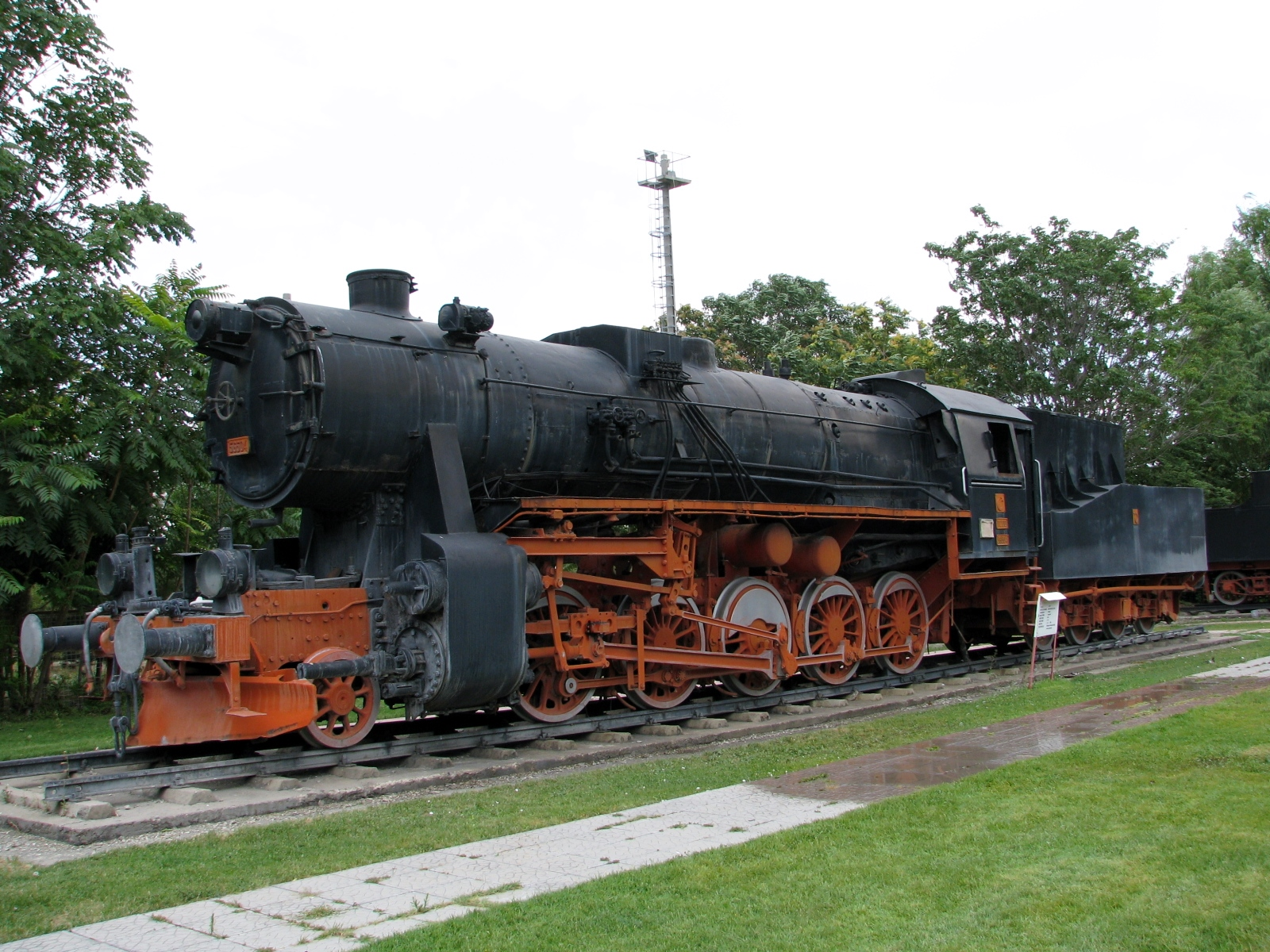
56504 at TCDD Open Air Steam Locomotive Museum

The TCDD (Turkish Republic Railways) 56501 Class is a class of 2-10-0 steam locomotives provided by Germany during the Second World War. They were numbered 56501-56553 .

== Overview ==
After the outbreak of the Second World War, the United Kingdom was unable to supply locomotives ordered by TCDD. Nazi Germany stepped in and offered the Turks DRG BR 52-type Kriegloks. 10 were supplied in 1943, and 43 more were lent to the Turks in 1943/1944, the loan of which was made permanent after Turkey declared war on Germany towards the end of the war in Europe. In response to the initial German move the Allies gave TCDD 20 LMS Stanier Class 8F which formed the 45151 Class and 29 USATC S200 Class which formed the 46201 Class.

All 53 survived into the 1980s.
