= Turkish Soldiers Monument in Beersheba =

Monument to fallen Ottoman soldiers

Coordinates: 31°14′44″N 34°47′09″E

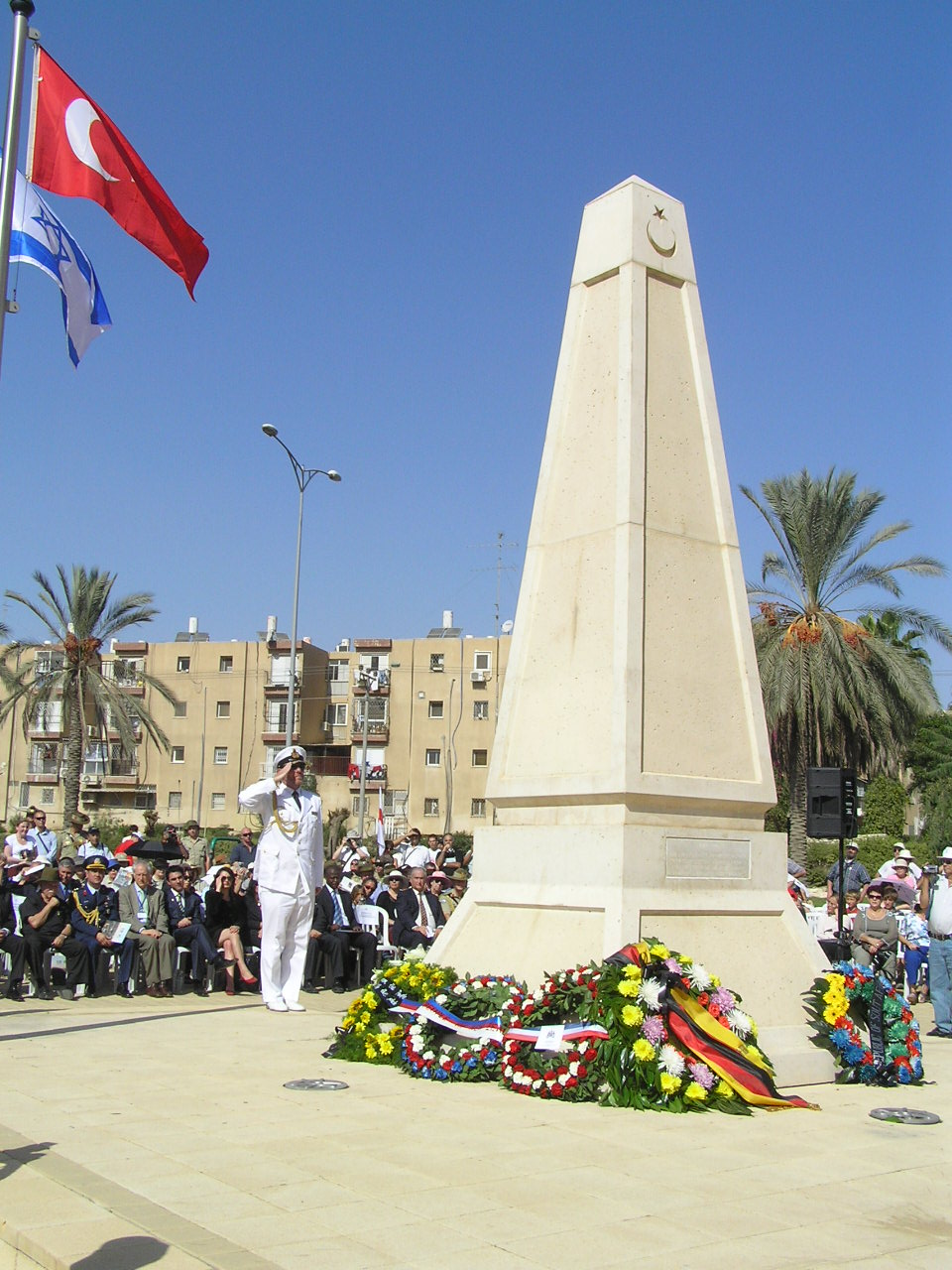
Turkish Soldiers Monument in Beersheba

Turkish Soldiers Monument in Beersheba is a monument that stands on David Tobiahu Boulevard, near the old Turkish railway station in Beersheba. The headstone was placed in 2002 by the Turkish government, in memory of 298 Turkish soldiers who fell in the Battle of Beersheba.

A memorial plaque was placed at the base of the tombstone in memory of the Turkish soldiers who fell in the campaign. The plaque was originally placed by the British on the entrance wall of the British military cemetery, in recognition of the respect for the dead that Turks showed when they placed a tombstone for a British pilot who died in battle against them. Next to the tombstone stands a head statue of Mustafa Kemal Atatürk.

In 2010, the tombstone was vandalized following the events of the flotilla to Gaza, when the inscription "All honor to the IDF" was sprayed on it, and an attempt was made to set fire to the Turkish flag next to it.

== See also ==
- Mustafa Kemal Atatürk Plaza (Beersheba)
