= Mustafa Kemal Atatürk Plaza (Beersheba) =

Square on the Turkish railway station in Beersheba

Coordinates: 31°14′43.7″N 34°47′08.6″E

- City square
- {{{other_names}}}
- Mustafa Kemal Atatürk Meydanı (Turkish)
- Opened: 21 October 2002
- Location: Beersheba
- Interactive map of Mustafa Kemal Atatürk Plaza
- Coordinates

Mustafa Kemal Atatürk Plaza is a square with the Turkish Soldiers Monument and the Atatürk Memorial, dedicated to the Ottoman soldiers who died during the Battle of Beersheba in Beersheba, Israel.

== History ==
The square was completed on 21 October 2002 in collaboration with Israel and Turkey. The square was renamed to Mustafa Kemal Atatürk Plaza in 2008.

== Atatürk Monument ==
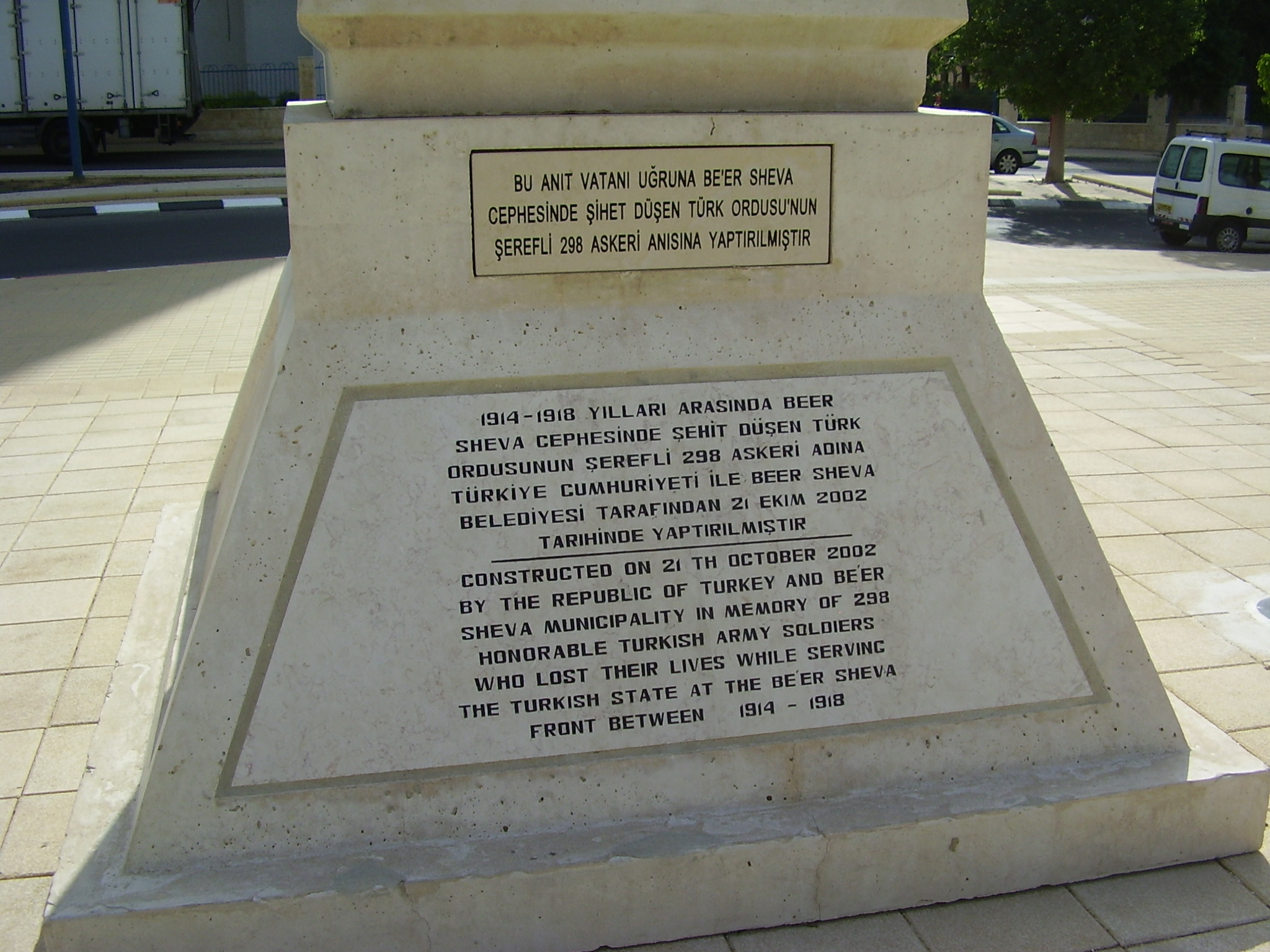
Inscription of the monument

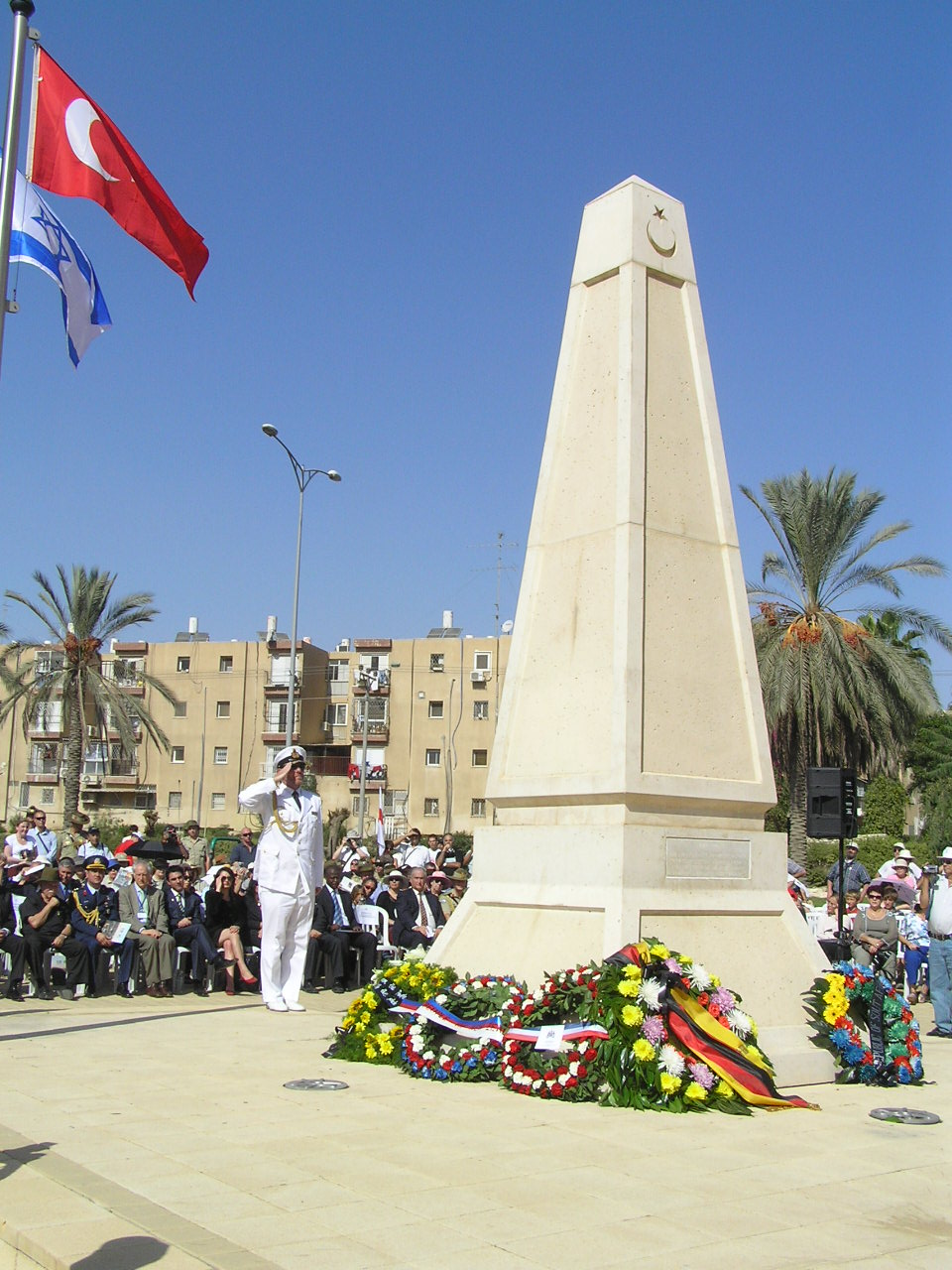
Ceremony at memorial for the fallen Ottoman soldiers

In October 2002, a monument to honor the 298 Turkish soldiers who lost their lives during the Battle of Beersheba in 1917 was erected east of the station in cooperation between the Beersheba Municipality and Turkish authorities.

A commemorative plaque was placed at the base of the monument. This plaque was previously located nearby at the Beer Sheva War Cemetery for British and ANZAC soldiers who died in the same battle.

On the square there is a bust of Mustafa Kemal Atatürk which reads his famous quote:

"Yurtta Barış, Dünyada Barış"
"Peace at Home, Peace in the World"

in three different languages. The original, Turkish, Hebrew and English. This was first pronounced by him publicly on 20 April 1931 during his tour of Anatolia. This stance was later integrated and implemented as the foreign policy of the Republic of Turkey. It was erected in 2008.

== See also ==
- Beersheba Turkish railway station
- Turkish Soldiers Monument in Beersheba
