= DRB Class 52 =

Class of German 2-10-0 locomotives

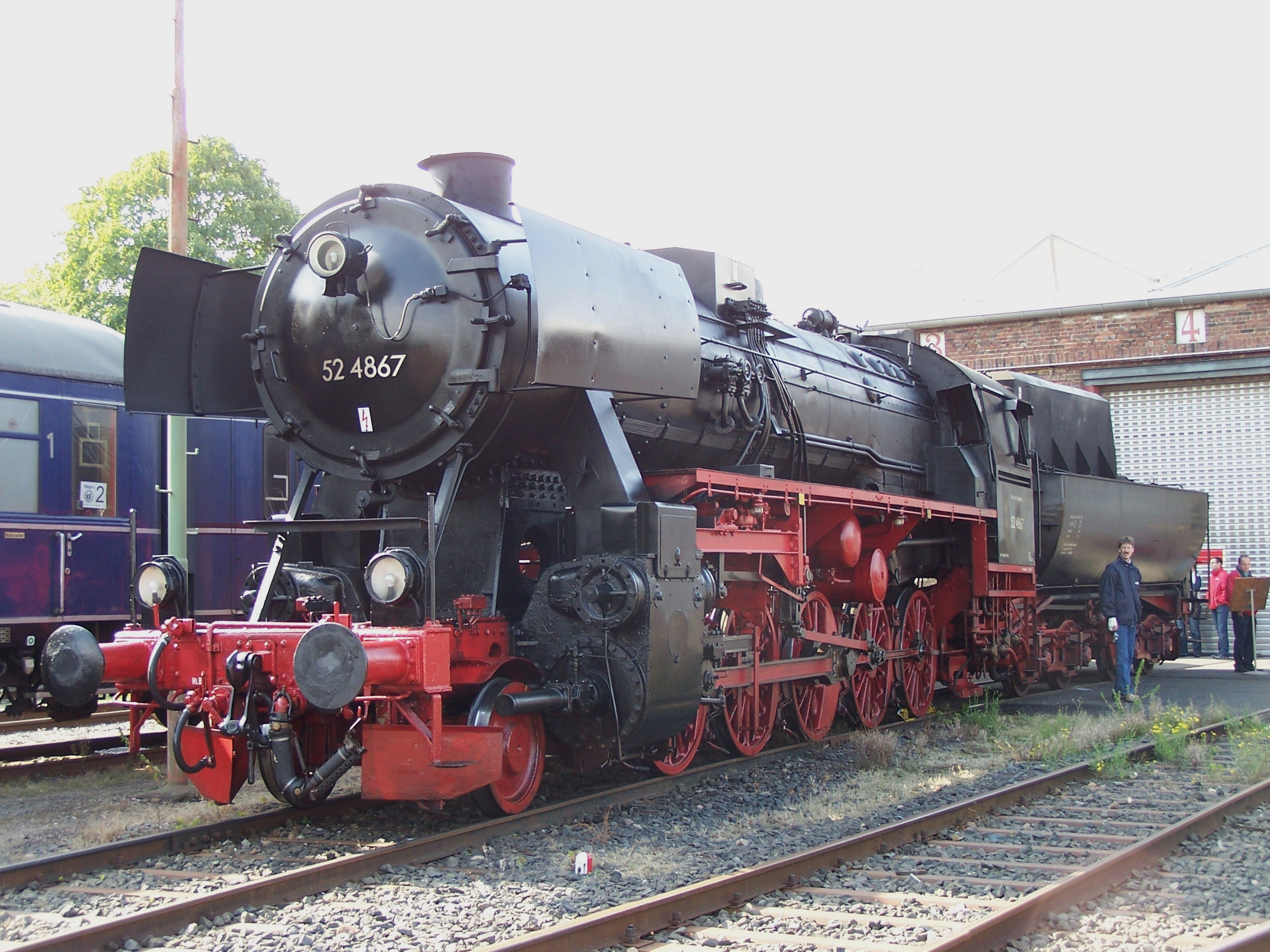
- 52 4867 of the HEF in Frankfurt am Main
Type and origin
- Power type: Steam
- Builder: See text
- Build date: 1942–c. 1950
- Total produced: 7,794
Specifications
- Configuration
  - Whyte: 2-10-0
  - UIC: 1′E h2
  - German: G 56.15
- Gauge: 1,435 mm (4 ft 8 1/2 in)
- Leading dia.: 850 mm (33 1/2 in)
- Driver dia.: 1,400 mm (55 1/8 in)
- Tender wheels: 2′2′ T 30: 930 mm (3 ft 5/8 in); 4 T 30: 1,000 mm (3 ft 3 3/8 in)
- Wheelbase
  - Axle spacing (Asymmetrical): 2,600 mm (8 ft 6 3/8 in) +; 1,650 mm (5 ft 5 in) +; 1,650 mm (5 ft 5 in) +; 1,650 mm (5 ft 5 in) +; 1,650 mm (5 ft 5 in) =
  - Engine: 9,200 mm (30 ft 2 1/4 in)
  - Tender: 2′2′ T 30: 1,800 mm (5 ft 10 7/8 in) +; 2,300 mm (7 ft 6 1/2 in) +; 1,800 mm (5 ft 10 7/8 in) =; 5,900 mm (19 ft 4 1/4 in); 4 T 30: 1,500 mm (4 ft 11 in) +; 1,600 mm (5 ft 3 in) +; 1,500 mm (4 ft 11 in) =; 4,600 mm (15 ft 1 1/8 in)
  - incl. tender: 2′2′ T 30: 19,000 mm (62 ft 4 in); 4 T 30: 18,220 mm (59 ft 9 3/8 in)
- Length
  - Over buffers: 2′2′ T 30: 22,975 mm (75 ft 4 1/2 in); 4 T 30: 22,830 mm (74 ft 10 7/8 in)
- Height: 4,400 mm (14 ft 5 1/4 in)
- Axle load: 15.1 t (14.9 long tons; 16.6 short tons)
- Adhesive weight: 75.7 t (74.5 long tons; 83.4 short tons)
- Empty weight: 75.9 t (74.7 long tons; 83.7 short tons)
- Service weight: 84.0 t (82.7 long tons; 92.6 short tons)
- Total weight: 102.7 t (101.1 long tons; 113.2 short tons)
- Tender type: 2′2′ T 30; 4 T 30
- Fuel type: Coal
- Fuel capacity: 10 t (9.8 long tons; 11 short tons)
- Water cap.: 30 m^{3} (6,600 imp gal; 7,900 US gal)
- Firebox
  - Grate area: 3.9 m^{2} (42 sq ft)
- Boiler
  - Pitch: 3,050 mm (10 ft 1/8 in)
  - Tube plates: 5,200 mm (17 ft 3/4 in)
  - Small tubes: 54 mm (2 1/8 in), 113 off
  - Large tubes: 133 mm (5 1/4 in), 35 off
- Boiler pressure: 16 bar (16.3 kgf/cm^{2}; 232 psi)
- Heating surface
  - Firebox: 15.9 m^{2} (171 sq ft)
  - Tubes: 90.4 m^{2} (973 sq ft)
  - Flues: 71.3 m^{2} (767 sq ft)
  - Total surface: 177.6 m^{2} (1,912 sq ft)
- Superheater
  - Heating area: 63.7 m^{2} (686 sq ft)
- Cylinders: Two, outside
- Cylinder size: 600 mm × 660 mm (23 5/8 in × 26 in)
- Valve gear: Heusinger Valve Gear (Kuhn Slide)
- Valve type: Piston Valve
- Train heating: Steam
- Loco brake: Knorr Air
- Train brakes: Knorr Air
- Couplers: Screw Link
Performance figures
- Maximum speed: 80 km/h (50 mph)
- Indicated power: 1,620 PS (1,190 kW; 1,600 hp)
Career
- Operators: DRB
- Numbers: DRB: 52 001…52 7794 (Germany); JŽ: 33 001 – 33 341, 33 501 – 33 505 (Yugoslavia); BDŽ: 15.01–16.50 (Bulgaria)
- Retired: BDŽ: 1969-1975 (Bulgaria); ČSD: 1976 (Czechoslovakia); DB: 1962; DR: 1988; ÖBB: 1976; JŽ: 1988-1992
- Preserved: Many preserved
- Weights are for locos with plate frames

DRB Class 52 (condensing tender)
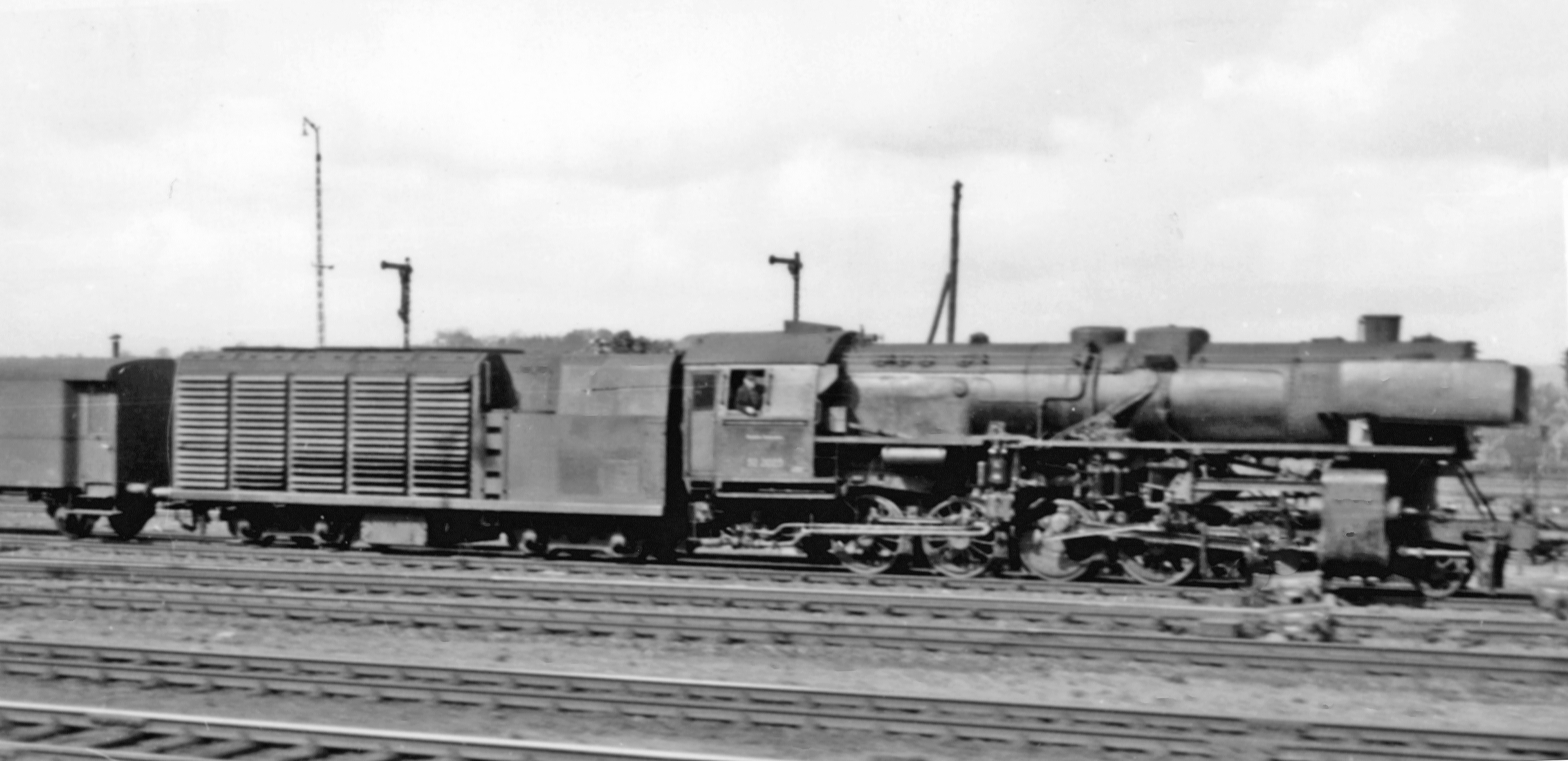
- Class 52 at Altenbeken in March 1953 with a 2′2′ T 13.5 Kon tender
Type and origin
- Only changes from standard version are shown
- Power type: Steam
- Builder: Henschel & Sohn
- Build date: 1943–1945
- Total produced: 3′2′ T 16 Kon: 140; 2′2′ T 13.5 Kon: 38
Specifications
- Wheelbase
  - Tender: 3′2′ T 16 Kon: 1,500 mm (4 ft 11 in) +; 1,500 mm (4 ft 11 in) +; 4,385 mm (14 ft 4 5/8 in) +; 2,000 mm (6 ft 6 3/4 in) =; 9,385 mm (30 ft 9 1/2 in); 4 T 30: 1,800 mm (5 ft 10 7/8 in) +; 3,650 mm (11 ft 11 3/4 in) +; 1,800 mm (5 ft 10 7/8 in) =; 7,250 mm (23 ft 9 3/8 in)
  - incl. tender: 3′2′ T 16 Kon: 23,185 mm (76 ft 3/4 in); 2′2′ T 13.5 Kon: 21,755 mm (71 ft 4 1/2 in)
- Length
  - Over buffers: 3′2′ T 16 Kon: 27,535 mm (90 ft 4 in); 2′2′ T 13.5 Kon: 26,205 mm (85 ft 11 3/4 in)
- Axle load: 15.7 t (15.5 long tons; 17.3 short tons)
- Adhesive weight: 78.7 t (77.5 long tons; 86.8 short tons)
- Empty weight: 81.2 t (79.9 long tons; 89.5 short tons)
- Service weight: 89.1 t (87.7 long tons; 98.2 short tons)
- Tender type: 3′2′ T 16 Kon; 2′2′ T 13.5 Kon
- Fuel type: Coal
- Fuel capacity: 9 t (8.9 long tons; 9.9 short tons)
- Water cap.: 16 or 13.5 m^{3} (3,520 or 2,970 imp gal; 4,230 or 3,570 US gal)
- Cylinders: 2
- Valve gear: Heusinger (Kuhn Slide)
- Valve type: Piston Valve
- Train heating: Steam
- Loco brake: Knorr
- Train brakes: Knorr
- Couplers: Screw Link
Performance figures
- Maximum speed: 80 Kmh (50 mph)
- Power output: 1,620 PS (1,600 HP)
Career
- Numbers: 3′2′ T 16 Kon: 52 1850 – 52 1989; 2′2′ T 13.5 Kon: 52 1990 – 52 2027

The Deutsche Reichsbahn's Class 52 (Note: Wartime locomotives classes are prefixed DRB (Deutsche Reichsbahn) to distinguish them from those introduced by the DRG (prefixed DRG), which became defunct in 1937, and those introduced later by the East German Deutsche Reichsbahn (prefixed DR).) is a German coal-fired steam locomotive built in large numbers after 1941 to supply the extended Eastern Front. It was the most produced type of the so-called Kriegslokomotiven or Kriegsloks (war locomotives). The Class 52 was a wartime development of the pre-war DRG Class 50, using fewer parts and less expensive materials to speed production. They were designed by Richard Wagner who was Chief Engineer of the Central Design Office at the Locomotive Standards Bureau of the DRG. About a dozen classes of locomotive were referred to as Kriegslokomotiven; however, the three main classes were the Class 52, 50 and 42. They were numbered 52 1-52 7794. A total of 20 are preserved in Germany.

Many locomotives passed into Russian ownership after the Second World War. In the USSR, the class were designated TE (TЭ). Other operators of the type included Poland, Romania, Bulgaria, Norway and Turkey, among others.

== Design ==
The Class 52 was a simplified version of the prewar Reichsbahn class 50 locomotive (produced 1938–1942). The simplified design of the class 52 was intended to reduce the man-hours and skills needed to manufacture it and to adapt to wartime shortages of strategic materials. Additional design changes gave the locomotives and their crew better protection against the cold. Between 1942 and the end of the war in May 1945, over 6,300 Class 52 locomotives were built. Additional locomotives were built post-war, giving a class total of probably 6719 units, delivered by seventeen manufacturers. The Class 42 was a larger version of the Class 52, but was produced in smaller numbers.

Wagner had wanted locomotives which were long-lasting and easy to maintain, and unlike British engineers did not consider a high power-to-weight ratio a priority. The resulting Kriegslokomotive had a low axleload of 15 tonnes (14.8 long tons; 16.5 short tons) and could haul 40 percent more freight than the old Prussian locomotives they replaced. The Class 52 could haul 1,200 tonnes (1,180 long tons; 1,320 short tons) at 65 km/h (40 mph) without significant strain. On a 3% grade they could haul 800 tons at 5 km/h.

== Manufacture ==
Over 7,794 locomotives of DRB Class 52 type were built across Europe for use on the Eastern Front during the Second World War. Thus it was one of the most numerous steam locomotives in the world. To achieve such numbers, the German locomotive manufacturers were merged into the 'Community of Greater German Locomotive Manufacturers', Gemeinschaft Grossdeutscher Lokomotivhersteller (GGL), which was a subdivision of the 'Rail Vehicles Main Committee', Hauptausschuss Schienenfahrzeuge (HAS) founded in 1942. Key HAS figures were the Reichsminister for munition and armament, Albert Speer and the Reich transport minister, Julius Dorpmüller.

Following the invasion of Poland in September 1939, Nazi Germany disbanded the Polish State Railways (PKP). Polish rail officials were either executed in mass shootings or imprisoned, and some 8,000 managerial positions were staffed with German officials. Former Polish companies began producing German engines BR44, BR50 and BR86 as early as 1940, some using forced labor. By 1944, the factories in Poznań and Chrzanów were producing the redesigned Kriegslok BR52 locomotives for the Eastern Front. These locomotives were made almost entirely of steel; locomotives in that battlespace were not expected to survive for long, so managers eliminated the use of higher-value non-ferrous metals like bronze, chrome, copper, brass, and nickel.

The GGL included the following locomotive manufacturers (including an approximate number of Class 52s produced):

1. LOFAG, Vienna: 1,053 units
2. Henschel, Kassel (Henschel Flugzeugwerke AG): 1,050 units (forced labor)
3. Schwartzkopff, Berlin: 647 units
4. Krauss-Maffei, Munich: 613 units
5. Borsig, Berlin; branches: Borsig-Rheinmetall AG Düsseldorf (in Siemianowice, Poland), Borsig Lokomotivwerke Hennigsdorf, Borsig Werke Breslau-Hundsfeld (now Wrocław-Psie Pole, Poland): 542 units (forced labor, incl. KL Auschwitz)
6. Schichau-Werke Elbing (now Elbląg, Poland): 505 units (forced labor, incl. KZ Stutthof, and its subcamps).
7. Maschinenbau und Bahnbedarfs AG (MBA) formerly Orenstein & Koppel, Babelsberg: 400 units
8. DWM Posen, Poznań (occupied Poland), German takeover of Polish manufacturer H. Cegielski – Poznań: 314 units (forced labor)
9. Oberschlesische Lokfabrik Krenau, Chrzanów (occupied Poland), German takeover of Polish manufacturer Fablok: 264 units (forced labor)
10. Maschinenfabrik Esslingen: 250 units
11. Jung, Jungenthal, Kirchen: 231 units
12. Škoda Works, Plzeň: 153 units
13. Grafenstaden, Strasbourg: 139 units

== Post-war use ==
In the early postwar years, Class 52s were used by many European countries. Western European countries replaced them with more modern locomotives as soon as possible, with the exception of Austria where they were used until 1976. The simplicity and effectiveness, plus the large production total, meant that many eastern European countries were slow to withdraw their Kriegslokomotiven. Poland used them into the 1990s; some in Bosnia are still in use as of 2023.

- Belgium, SNCB Type 26 – 100 locomotives originally ordered by the DRG from Belgian manufacturers during the occupation but not completed until after liberation.
- Bosnia – some still in industrial service transporting brown coal from the Kreka mine in Bosnia as of 2023.
- Bulgaria, BDŽ class 15 – over 150 locomotives numbered 15.01-1650 .
- Czechoslovakia, ČSD class 555.0 – Some rebuilt as Class 555.3 to burn mazut fuel oil, a large surplus of which was generated in synthetic fuel plants in occupied Czechoslovakia from brown coal. The 555.3 differed visibly by having a lid on the smokestack to slow down cooling of the lining of the flue passage, to prevent cracking.
- East Germany – around 800 locomotives. 200 rebuilt as DR Class 52.80
- Hungary, MÁV class 520 – 100 locomotives acquired from the Soviet Union in 1963 and used into the 1980s.
- Luxembourg, CFL 5600-series – 20 locomotives, half ex-SNCB Type 26, half built by SACM in 1946.
- Norway, NSB class 63 – 74 locomotives sent during the German occupation and seized post-war. Nicknamed Stortysker ("big German"). One engine, restored by the Norwegian Railway Club, is preserved at the Norwegian Railway Museum in Hamar.
- Poland, PKP class Ty2 – 1,200 locomotives after the end of the war, a further 200 acquired from the Soviet Union in 1962–64. Began to be phased out in the 1980s; its last regular use was in 1999.
- Romania, CFR class 150.1000 – about 100 locomotives.
- Soviet Union, Class TE (Russian: ТЭ, from Trophy, equivalent to E-class) – over 2,100 locomotives captured or seized.
- Turkey, TCDD class 56501 – 10 locomotives purchased from Germany in 1943, a further 43 loaned from Germany in 1943-44, which were permanently seized when Turkey declared war on Germany.
- Yugoslavia, Yugoslav Railways JŽ 33 – nearly 350 including 15 supplied directly to Serbia and 24 to Croatia during the occupation.

== Gallery ==
Several Class 52s have been preserved in operating condition. One is at the Nene Valley Railway in Peterborough, England. Another one is in service with the Franconian Museum Railway in Bavaria, Germany.

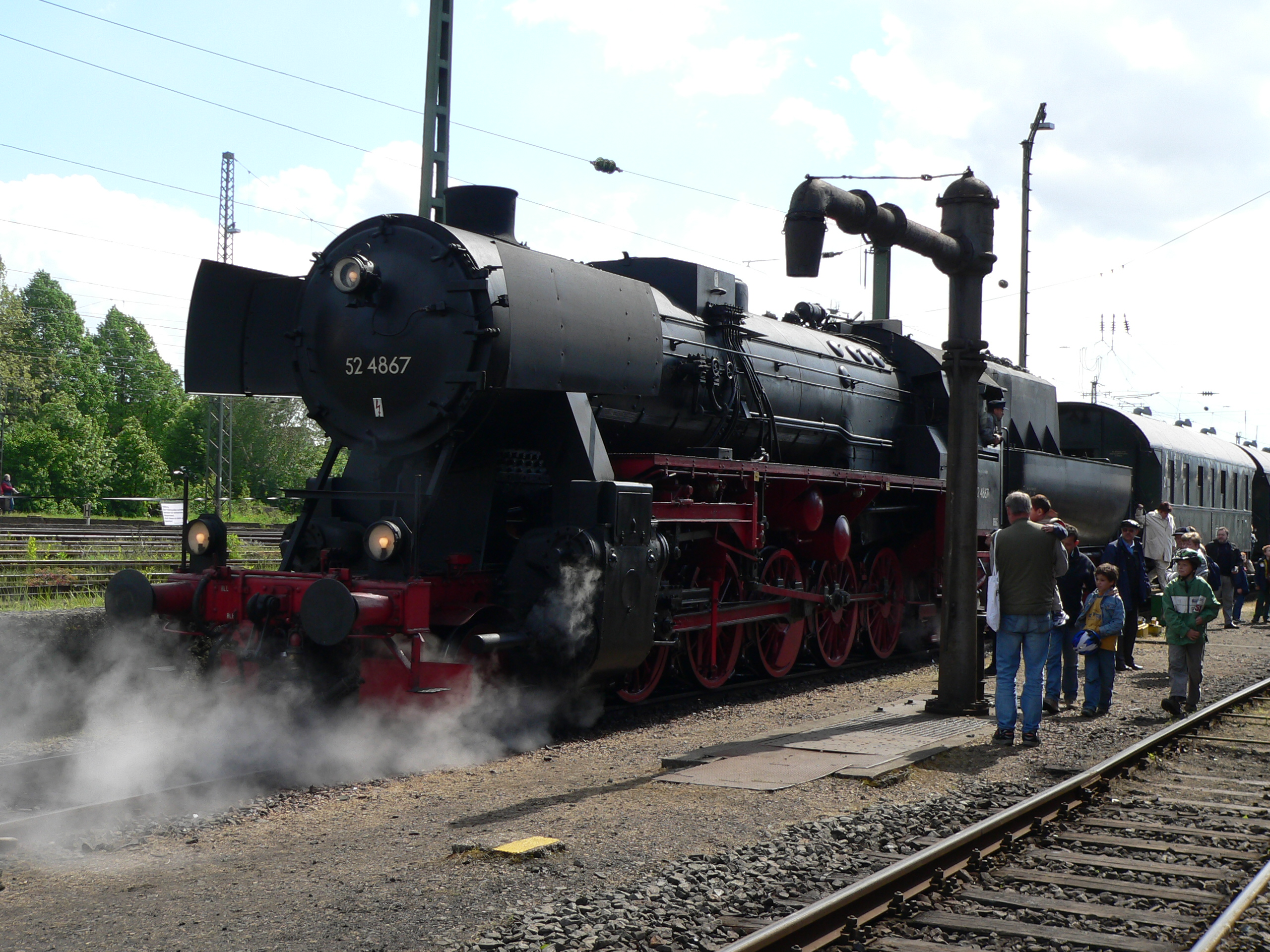
DB 52 4867 at the Eisenbahnmuseum Kranichstein (2005)

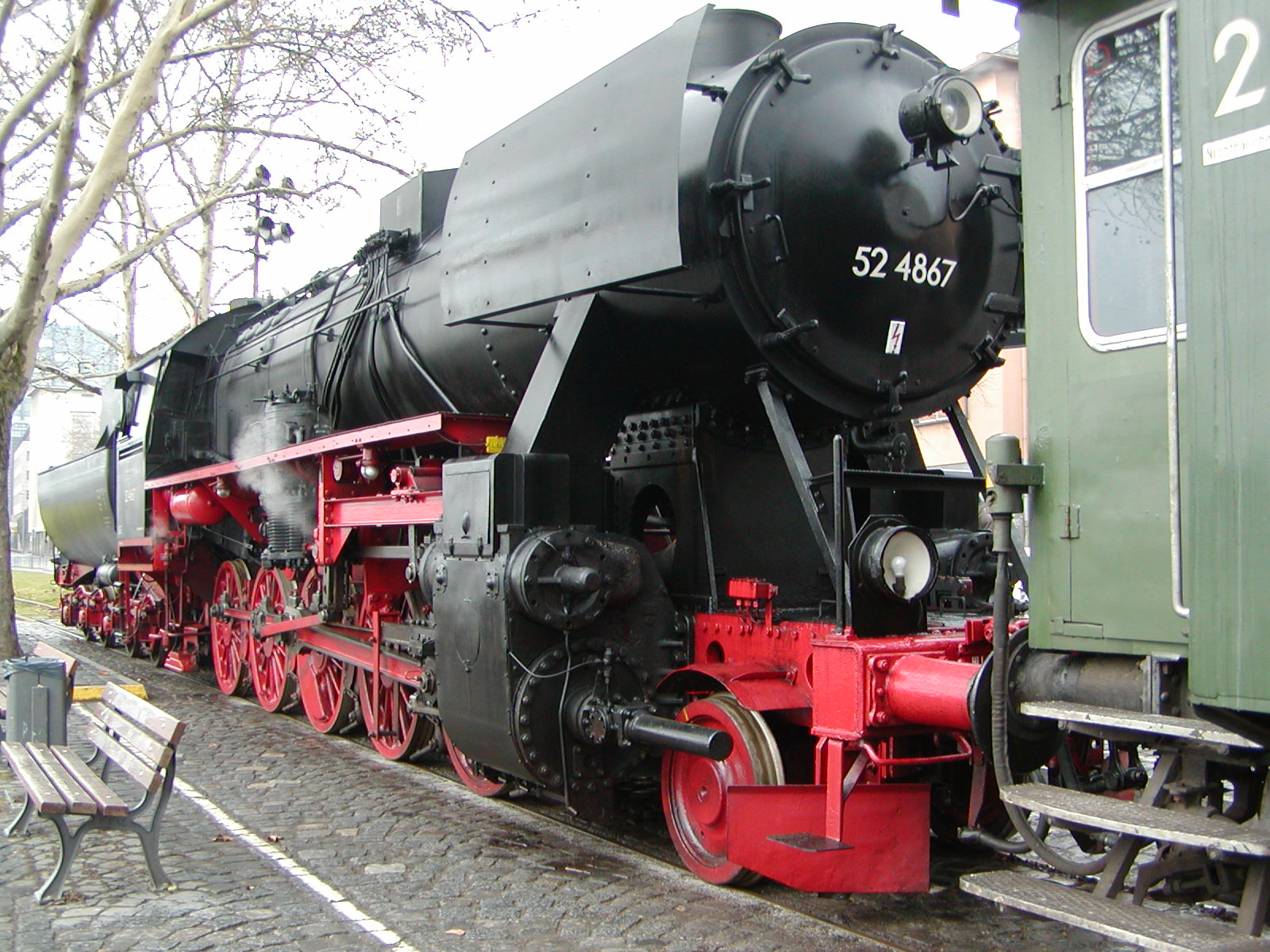
DB 52 4867 of the Historische Eisenbahn Frankfurt (2004)

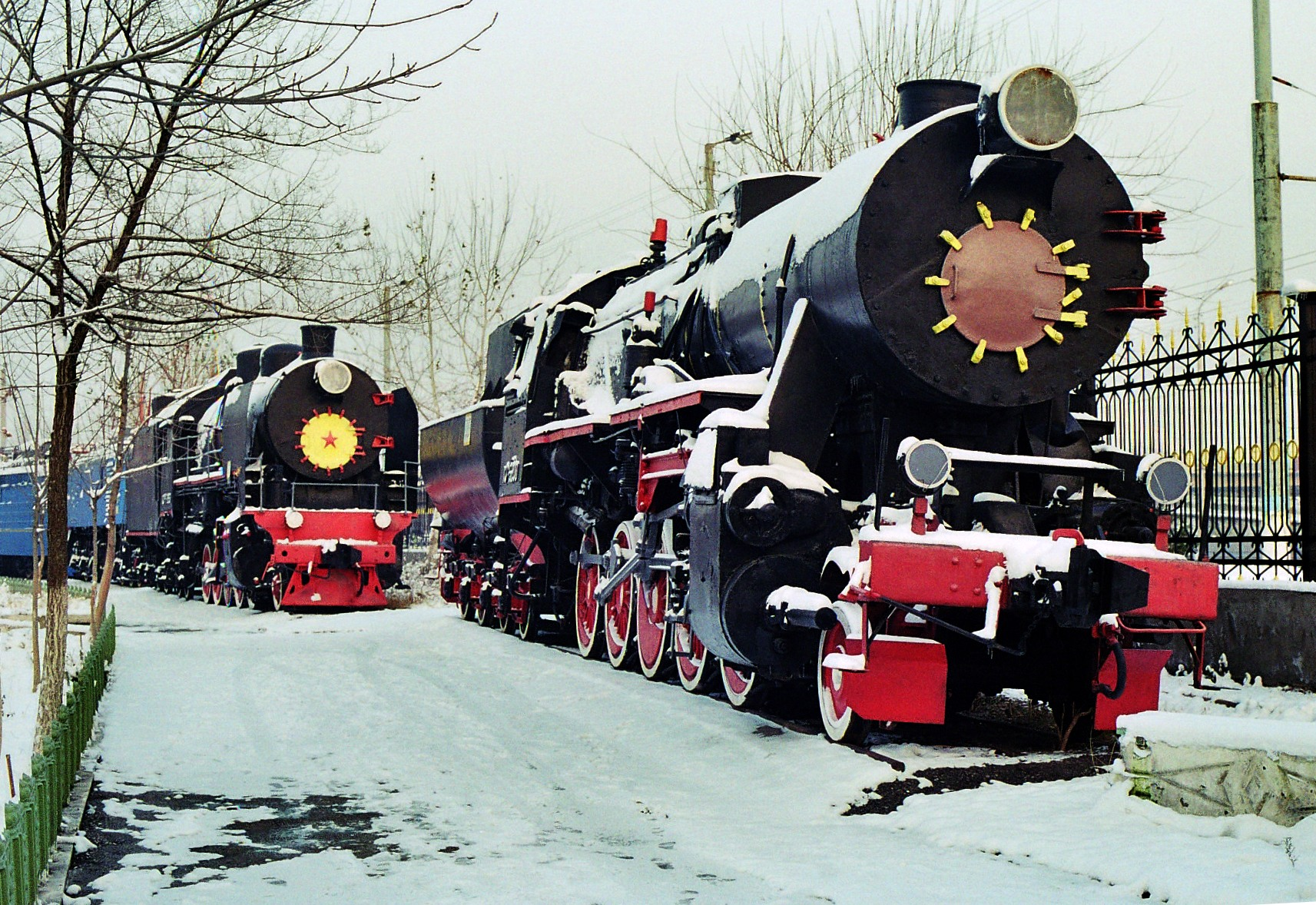
Soviet TЭ-5200 in Tashkent, Uzbekistan (2003)

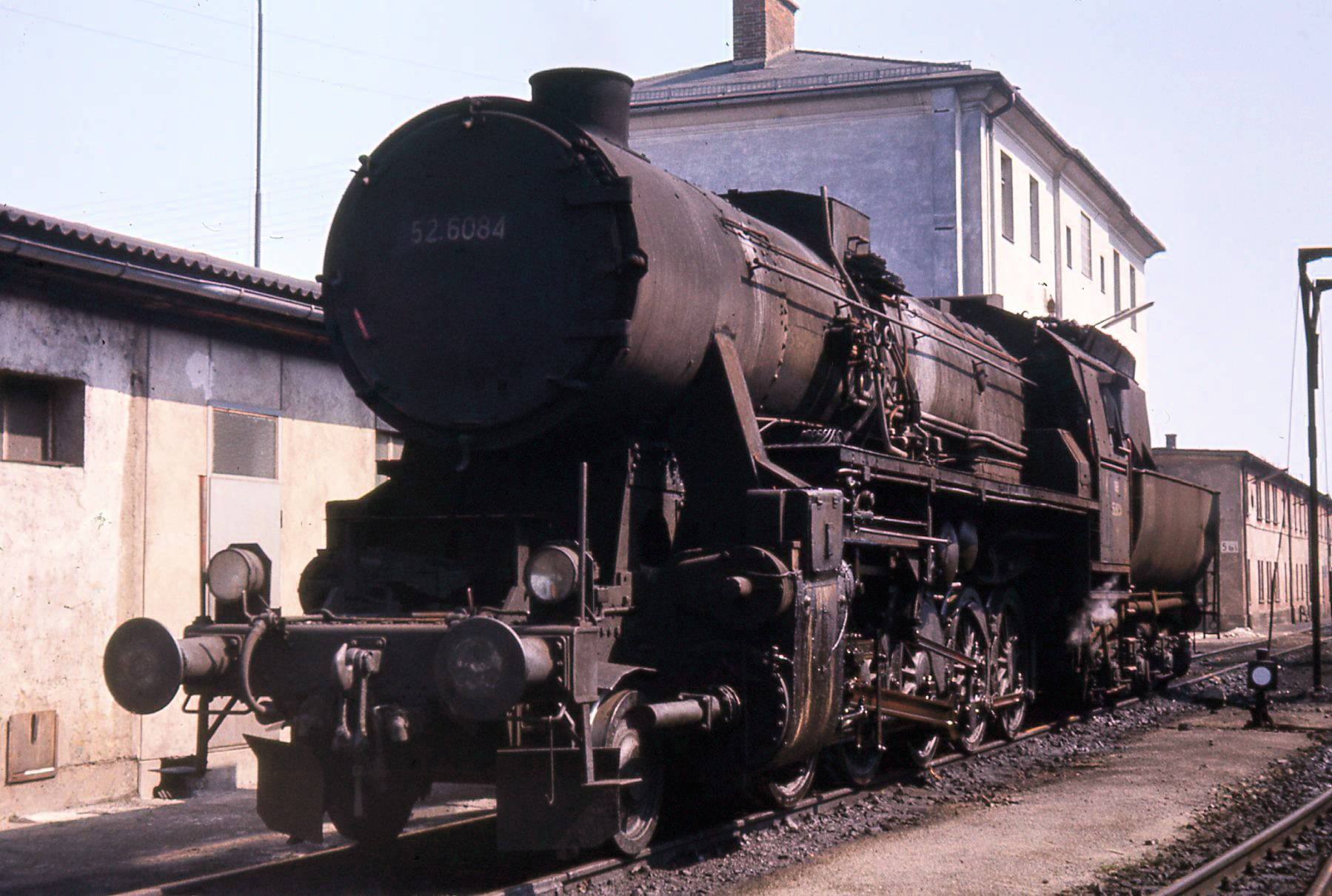
Austrian (ÖBB) 52 6084 (1971)

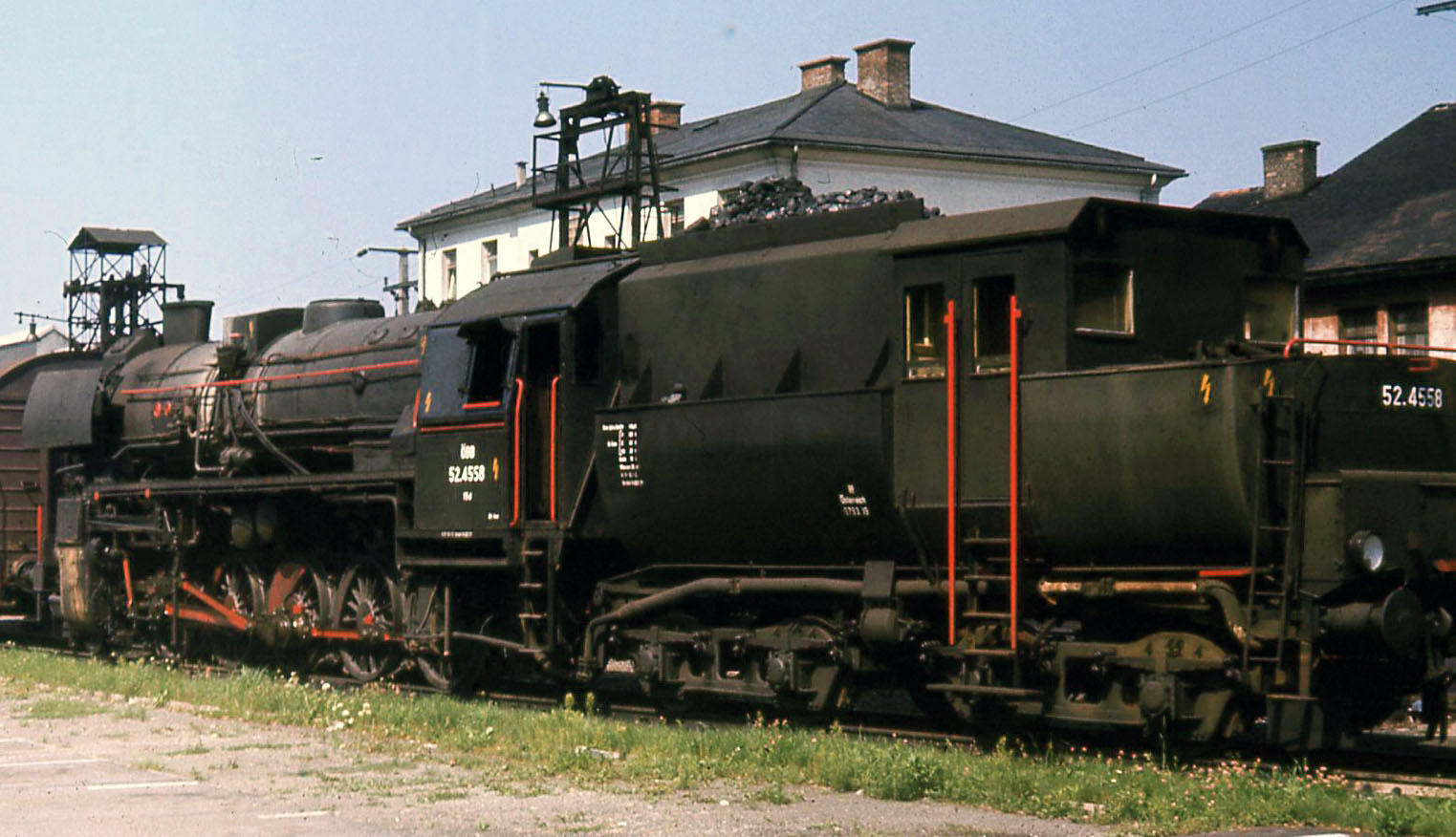
Austrian (ÖBB) 52 class rebuilt with tender cab, Giesl ejector, Graz (1971)

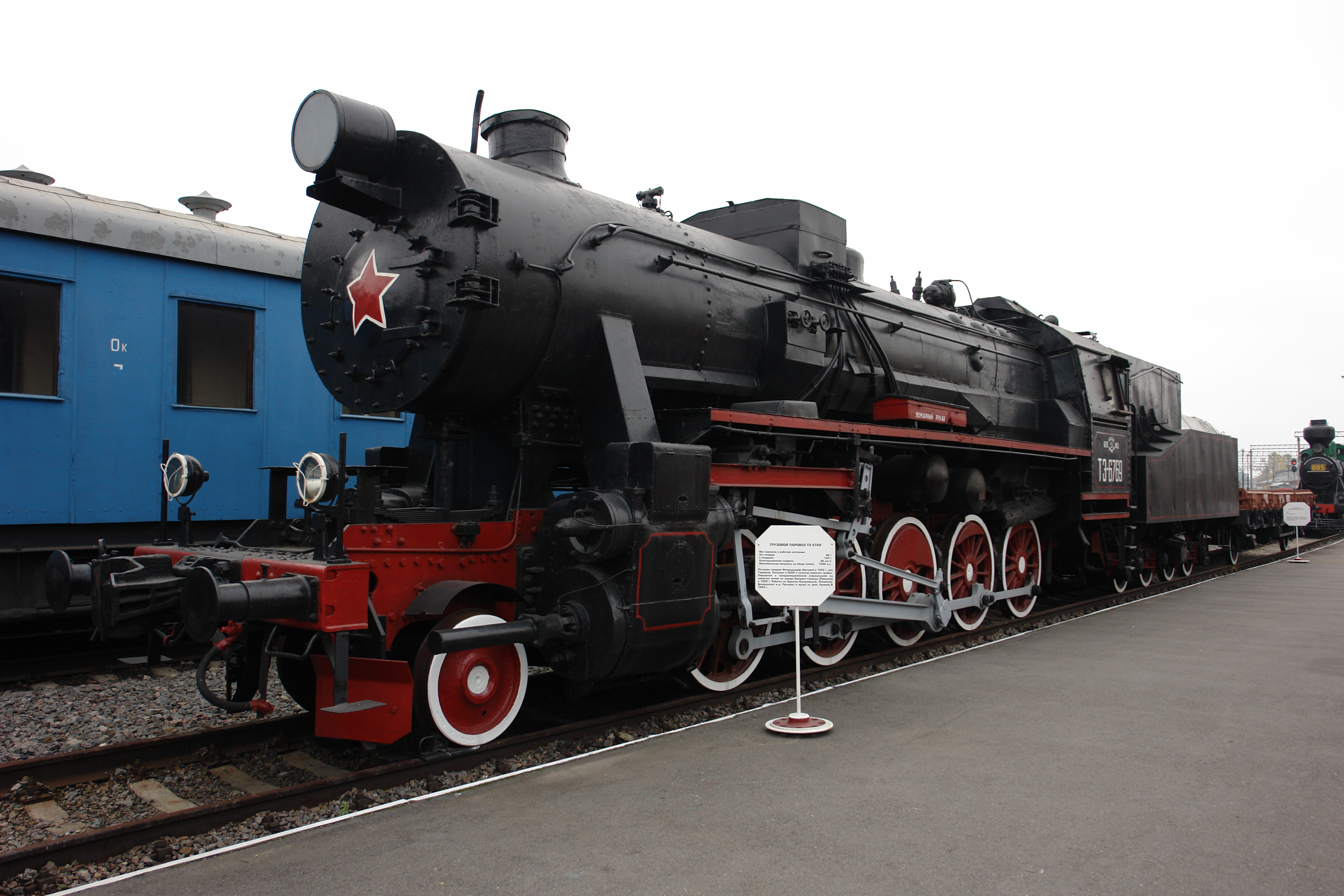
Soviet ТЭ-6769 (ex-Class 52) preserved at St. Petersburg (2007)

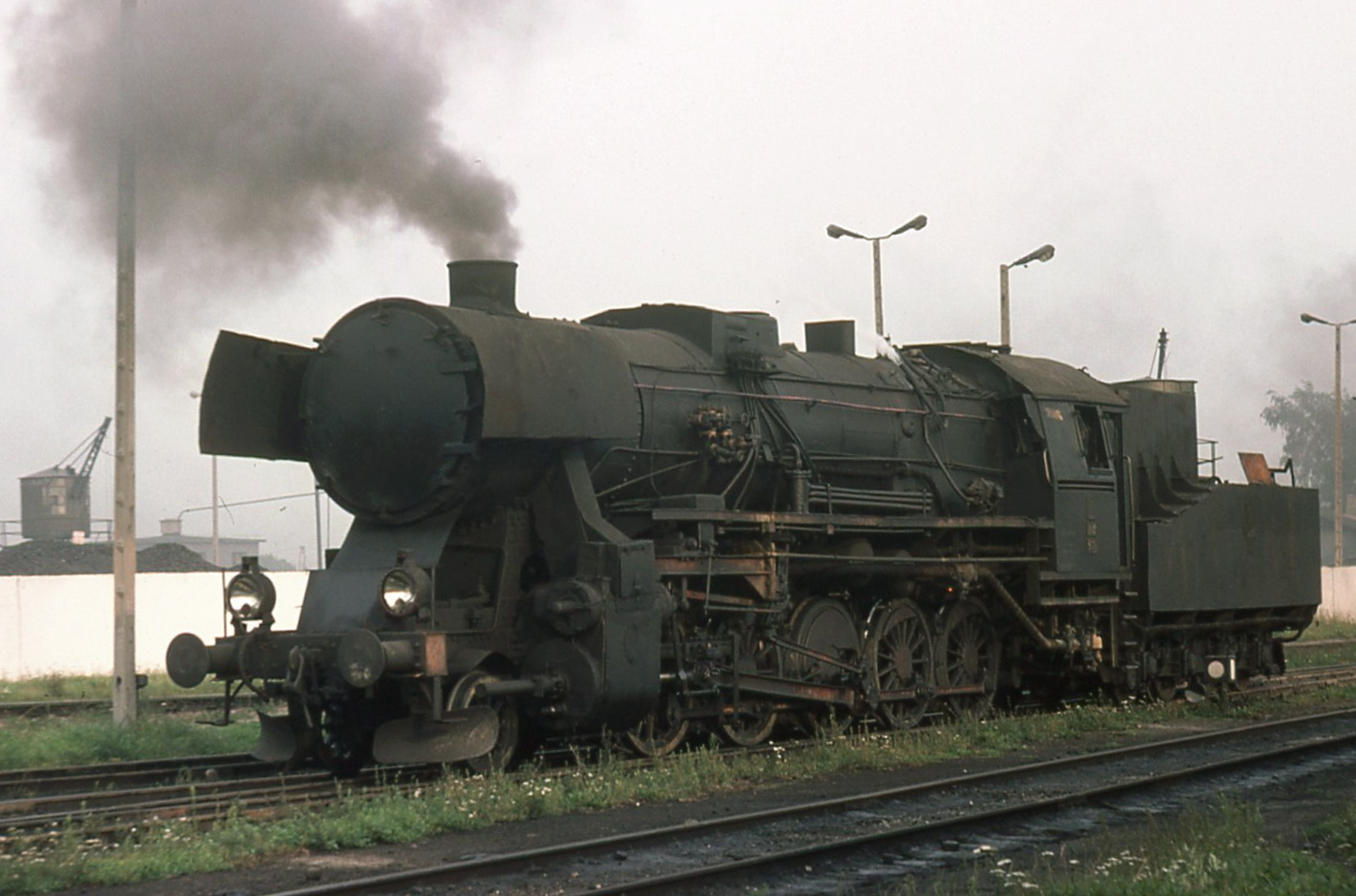
52 class as running after the War on PKP as class Ty2 (August 1976)

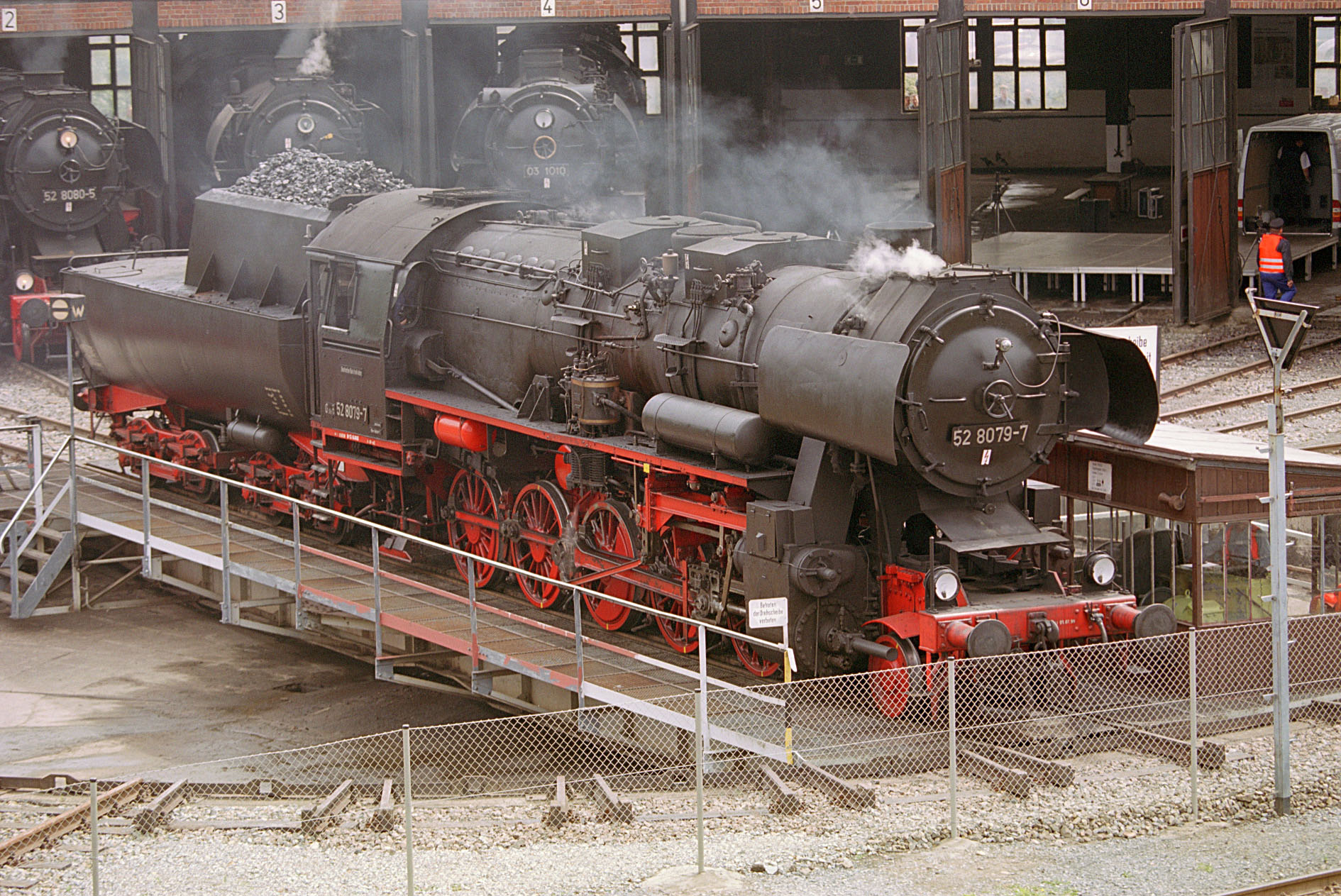
Reconstructed DR 52 8177-9 in Dresden (2003).

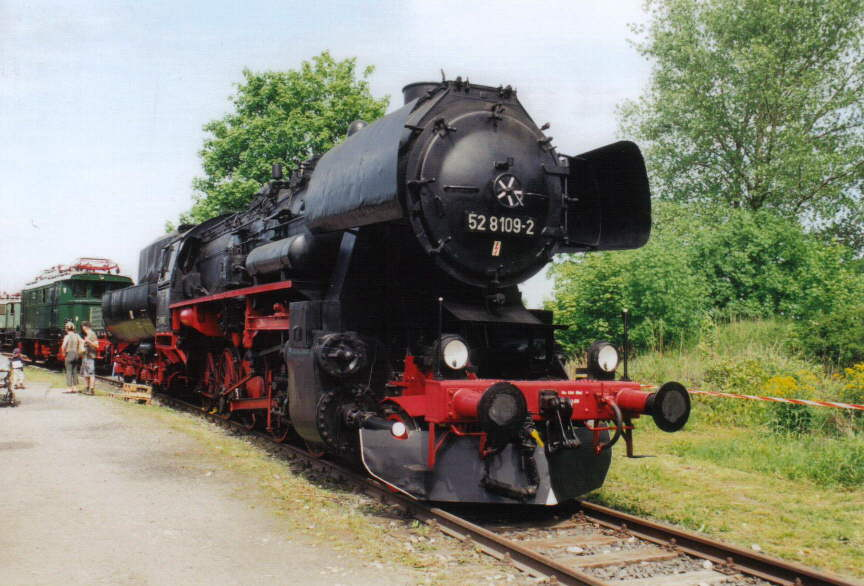
Reconstructed DR 52 8109-2 in Weimar (2003)

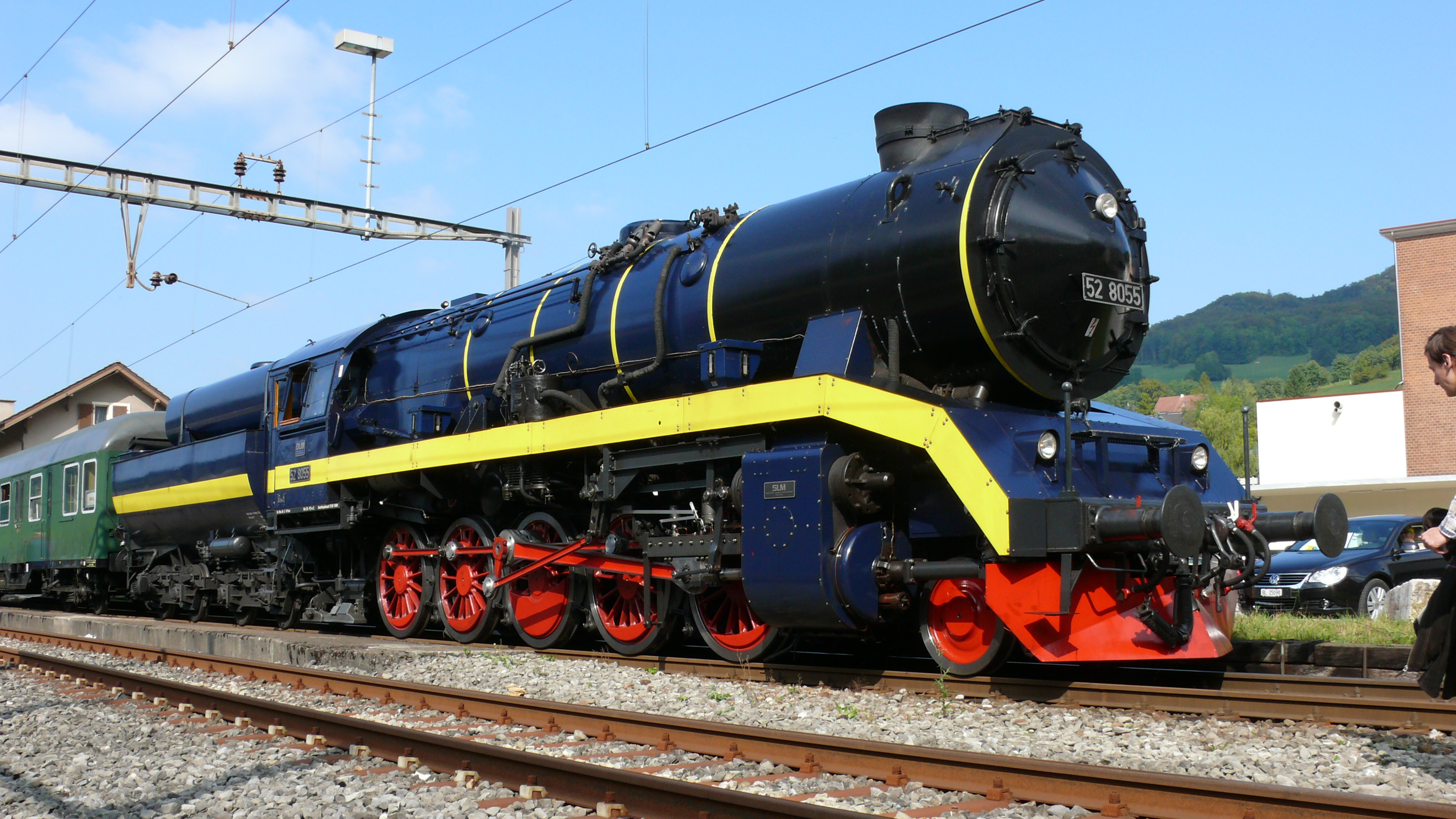
The most up to date class 52, 52 8055 completely rebuilt, Hauenstein

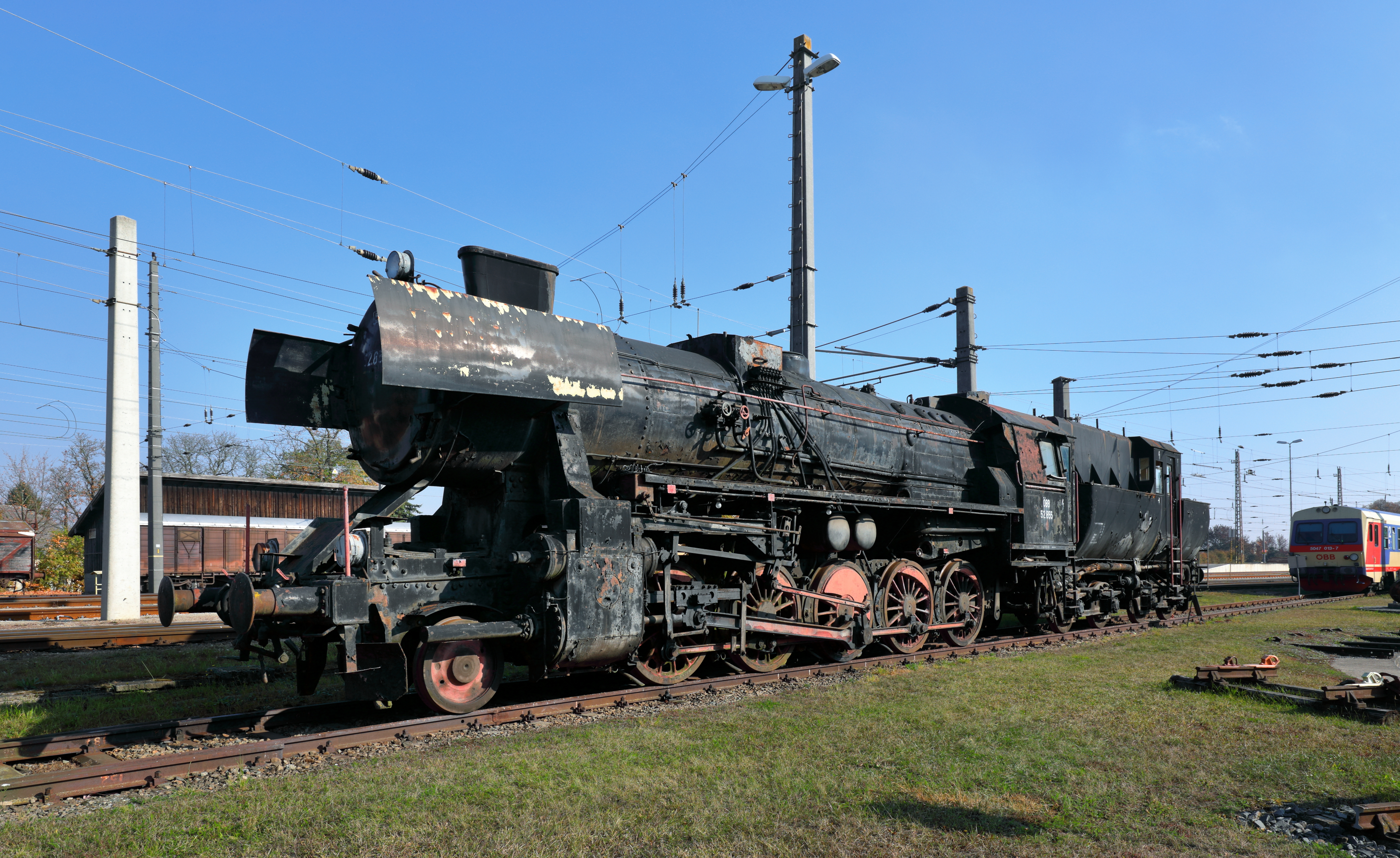
Steam locomotive 52.855 in the Railway Museum Sigmundsherberg, Lower Austria

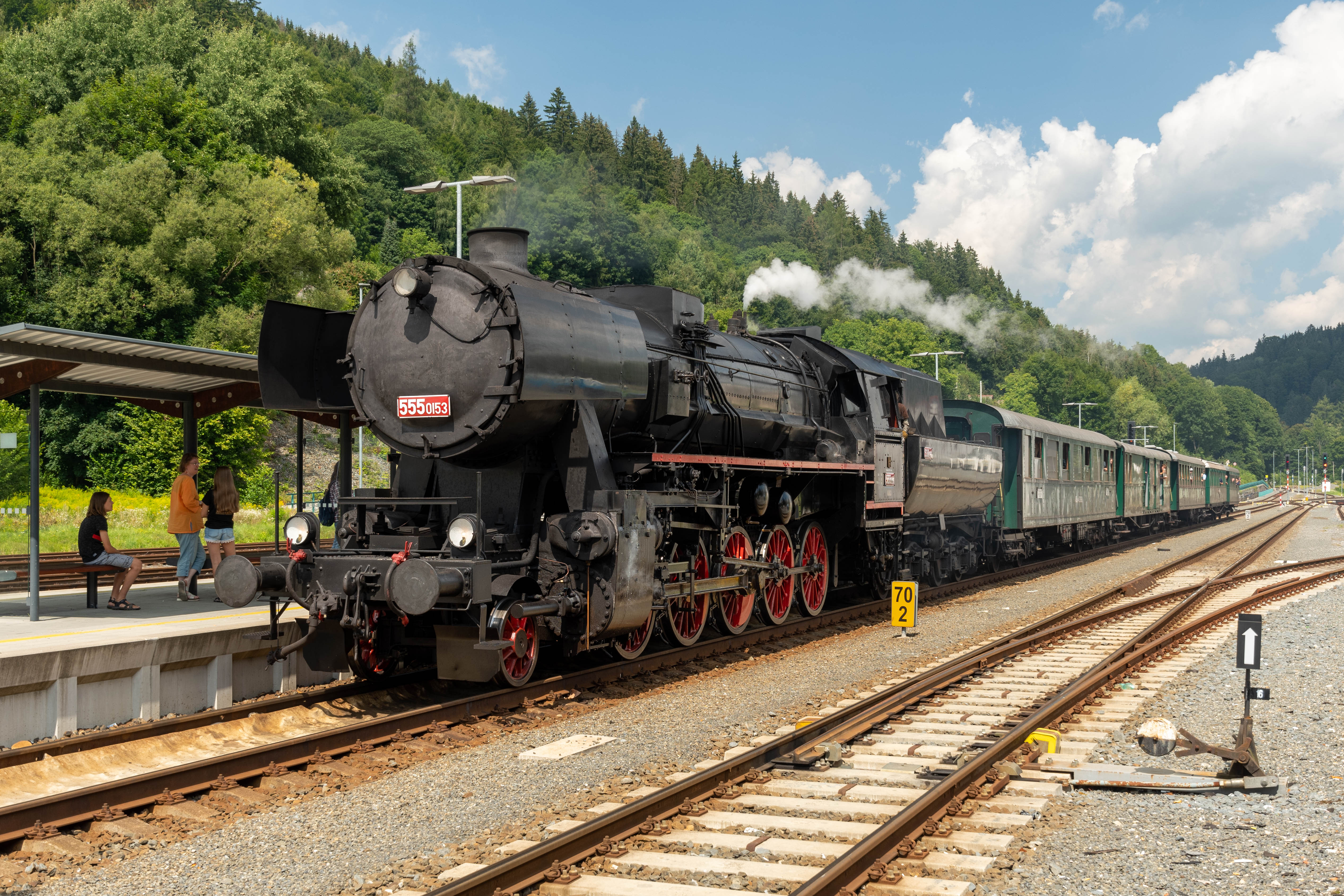
Czechoslovak (ČSD) 555.0 class in Hanušovice (2021)

== See also ==
- The Museum of the Moscow Railway, at Paveletsky Rail Terminal, Moscow
- Rizhsky Rail Terminal, Moscow, Home of the Moscow Railway Museum
- History of rail transport in Russia
- List of railway museums (worldwide)
- Russian Railway Museum, Saint Petersburg

== Literature ==
- Hütter, Ingo (2012). Die Dampflokomotiven der Baureihen 50 bis 53 der DRG, DRB, DB, und DR (in German). Werl: DGEG Medien. pp. 158–393, 395–409. ISBN 978-3-937189-63-5.
- Peter Slaughter; Alexander Vassiliev; Roland Beier (1996). The German Class 52 Kriegslok (in English and German). Frank Stenvalls Förlag. ISBN 91-7266-140-2.
- Weisbrod, Manfred; Müller, Hans; Petznik, Wolfgang (1978). Dampflokomotiven deutscher Eisenbahnen, Baureihe 41–59 (EFA 1.2) (in German) (3rd ed.). Düsseldorf: Alba. pp. 63–71. ISBN 3-87094-082-4.
