= Beersheba Turkish railway station =

Former railway station in Beersheba, Israel

Beersheba Turkish railway station תחנת הרכבת הטורקית בבאר שבע
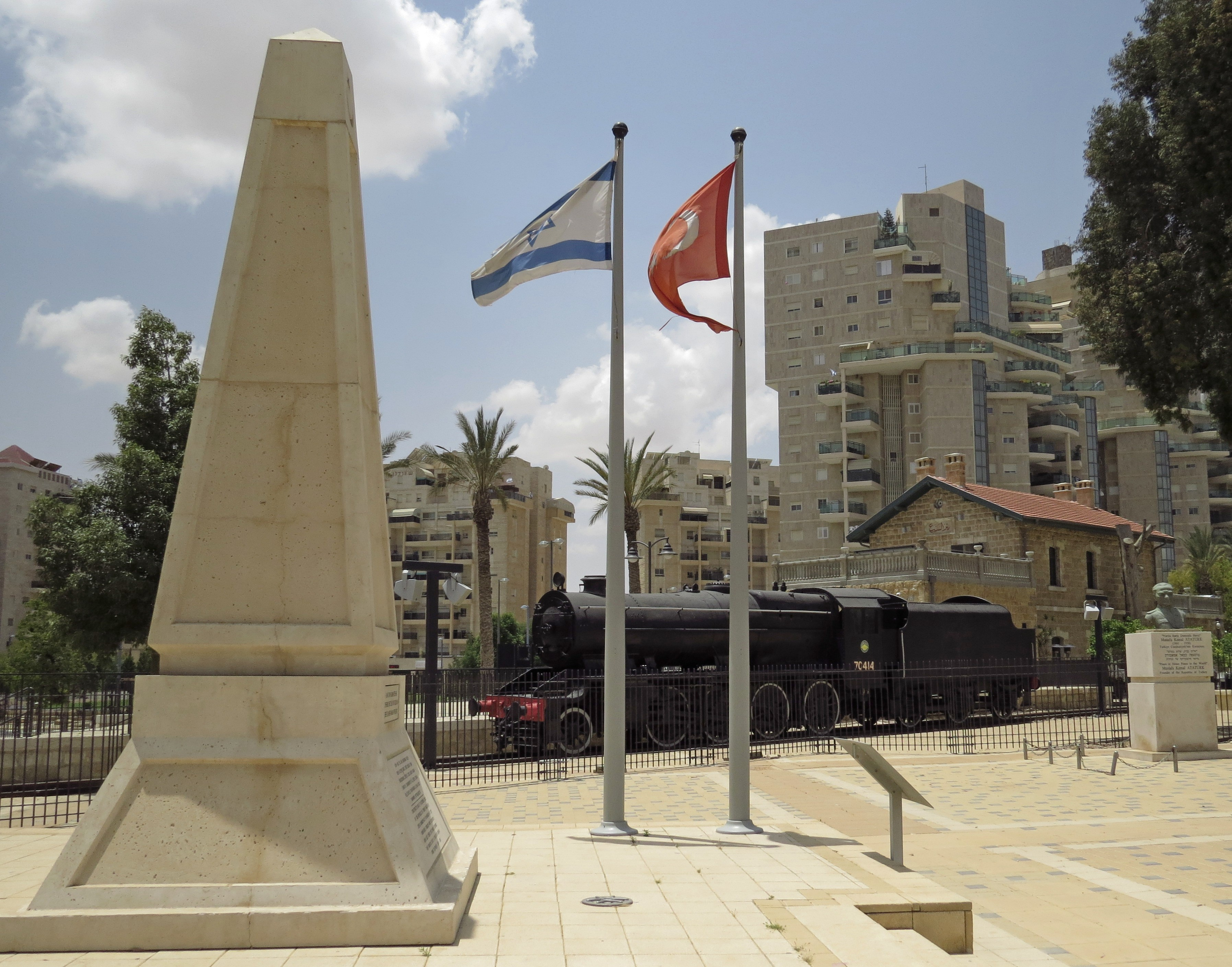
- The station photographed in 2015

General information
- Location: Ali Daivis Street, Beersheba
- Coordinates: 31.245370°N 34.784879°E
- Line: Railway to Beersheba

History
- Opened: 1915
- Closed: 1927
- Rebuilt: 2013
- Former names: 1915–1917: Birüssebi; 1917–1927: Beersheba
Location

The Beersheba Turkish railway station (Hebrew: תחנת הרכבת הטורקית בבאר שבע, Turkish: Beerşeba Türk Demiryolu İstasyonu) is an Ottoman railway station in the city of Beersheba, Israel, west of the Old City.

== History ==
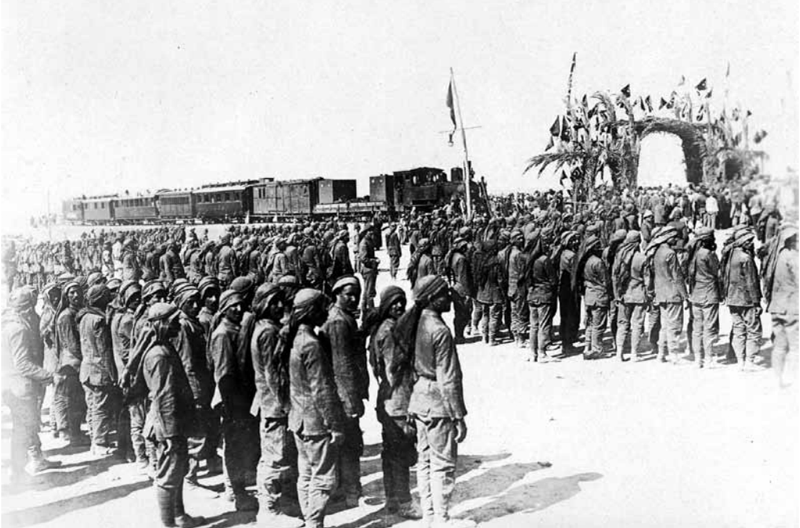
The Arab battalion at the opening of the train station in Bersheeba, by Khalil Raad

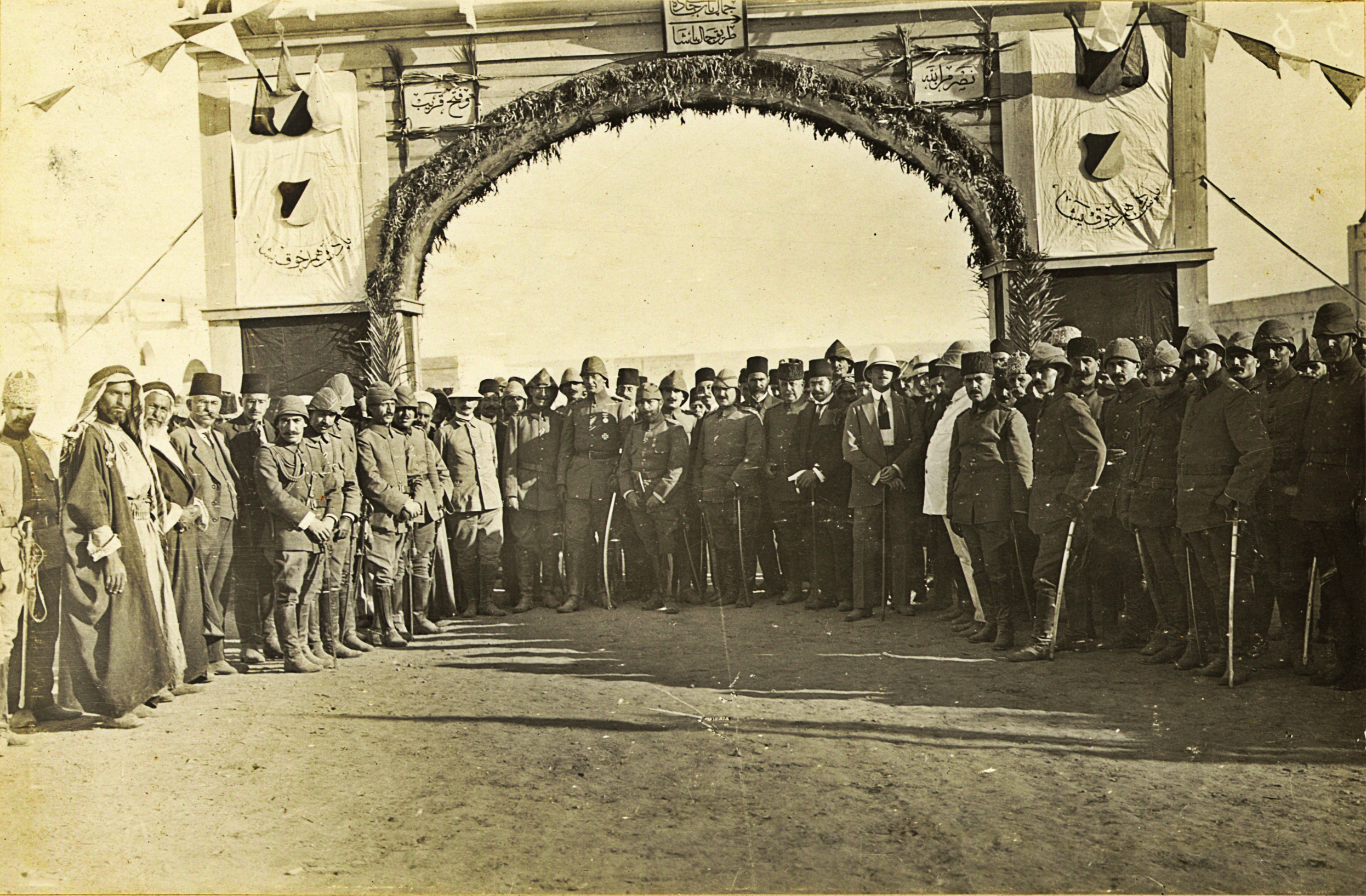
Opening of the Beersheba R.R.

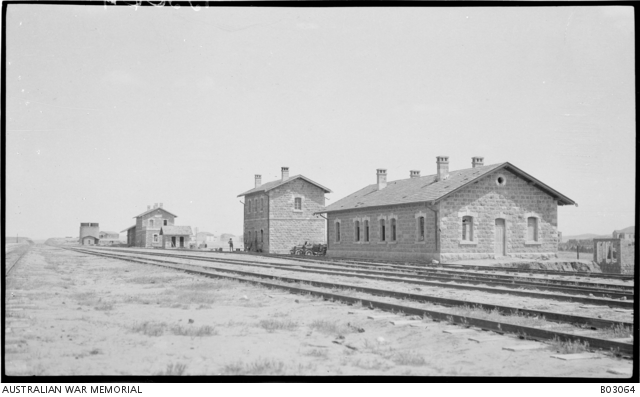
Beersheba Turkish railway station, 1918

=== Ottoman Empire ===
The station was opened in October 1915 during the Ottoman rule in Palestine and the Sinai and Palestine military campaign of World War I. The main Turkish objective in the Middle East during World War I was to either capture or disable the Suez Canal, which would have put the British Empire at a great disadvantage. However, transporting troops and supplies from Constantinople to the front lines took months by camel caravan.

After his ill-fated assault on the British garrison along the canal in January–February, 1915, Jamal Pasha enlisted the help of the German engineer Heinrich August Meissner, who also planned the Hejaz Railway, to help him find a more efficient method of logistics. Meissner started constructing a railway to the south of the Palestine region, with the Wadi Surar (Nahal Sorek) station serving as the starting point. Two railways were originally built: one to Beit Hanoun, and the other to Beersheba. The two lines were collectively called the 'Egyptian Branch'.

The Railway to Beersheba opened for traffic just nine months from the start of construction. The rest of the planned Egyptian branch was never completed, although Meissner managed to continue the line from Beersheba further south to Kusseima in the Sinai Peninsula.

The station complex included: a station building, similar in style and design as other Ottoman railway stations in Palestine, a water tower, an accommodation building for the Station master and a maintenance depot. The railway to Be'er Sheva enabled the Ottomans to quickly resupply their forces in the area, and made the station a major military center during the war.

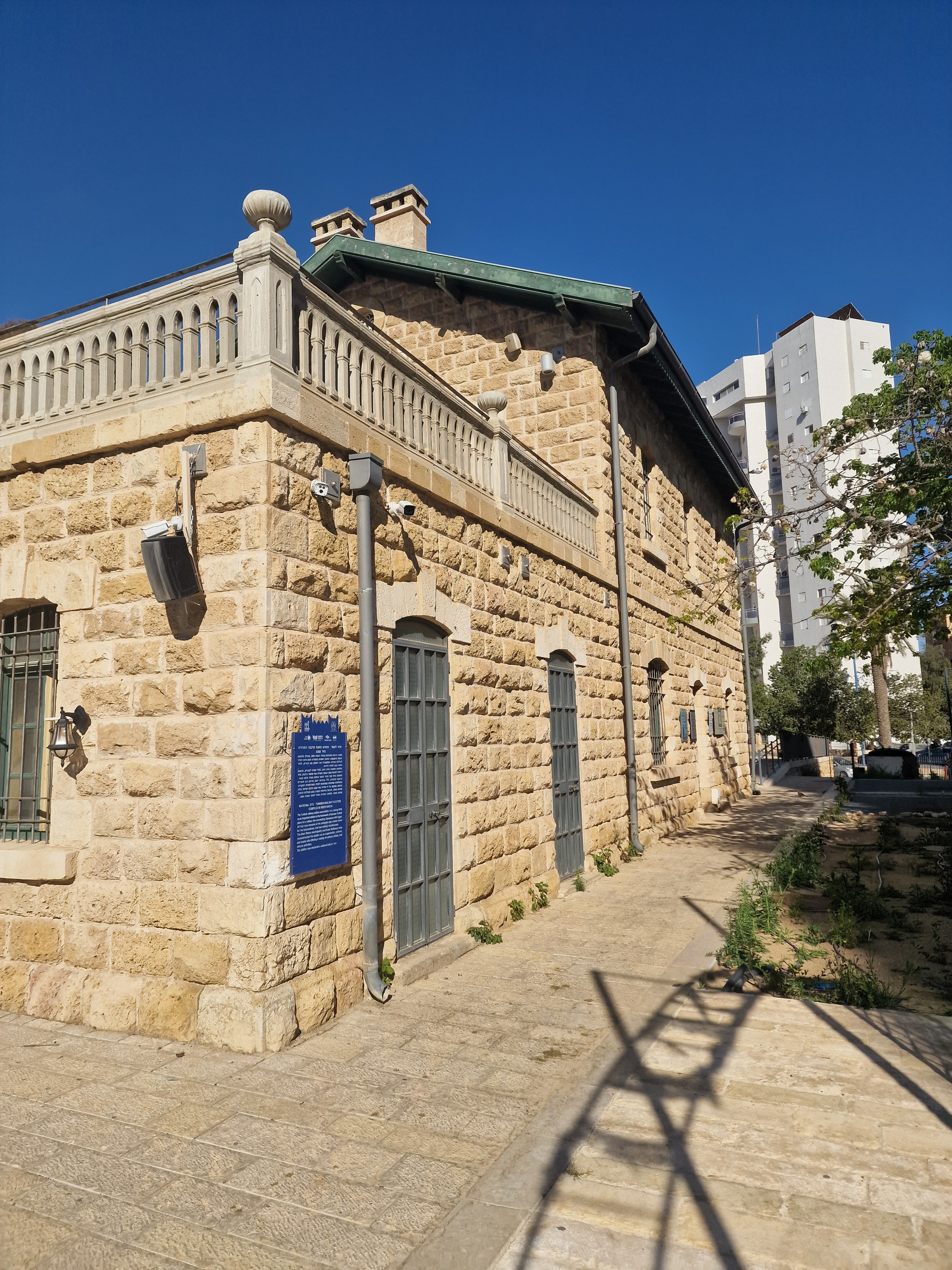
The Ottoman Railway Station in Beer Sheva.

=== British Mandate ===
In October 1917, after the Stalemate in Southern Palestine from April to October 1917, the British forces led by General Edmund Allenby captured Beersheba defended by the III Corps (which had fought at Gallipoli). The British connected the Railway to Beersheba to the coastal line in Qantara near Rafah by 3 May 1918, and the old connection to the north through Wadi Surar was discarded because it was not standard gauge. In July 1927, the line between Beersheba and Qantara was also discontinued and the station was closed, citing low usage and high maintenance costs.

=== Israel ===
Following Israeli independence, Israel Railways reconstructed the railway to Beersheba in standard gauge along an improved route. This railway did not reach the old Turkish station. Instead, a new station, Be'er Sheva North, was opened in the northeastern part of town in 1956, with the new railway extending from it then skirting Beersheba from the east and continuing towards Dimona. In 2000 Israel Railways built a spur from the railway heading to Dimona to a new passenger terminal in Beersheba named Be'er Sheva Center Railway Station. This station is located approximately 1250 meters east of the old Turkish station.

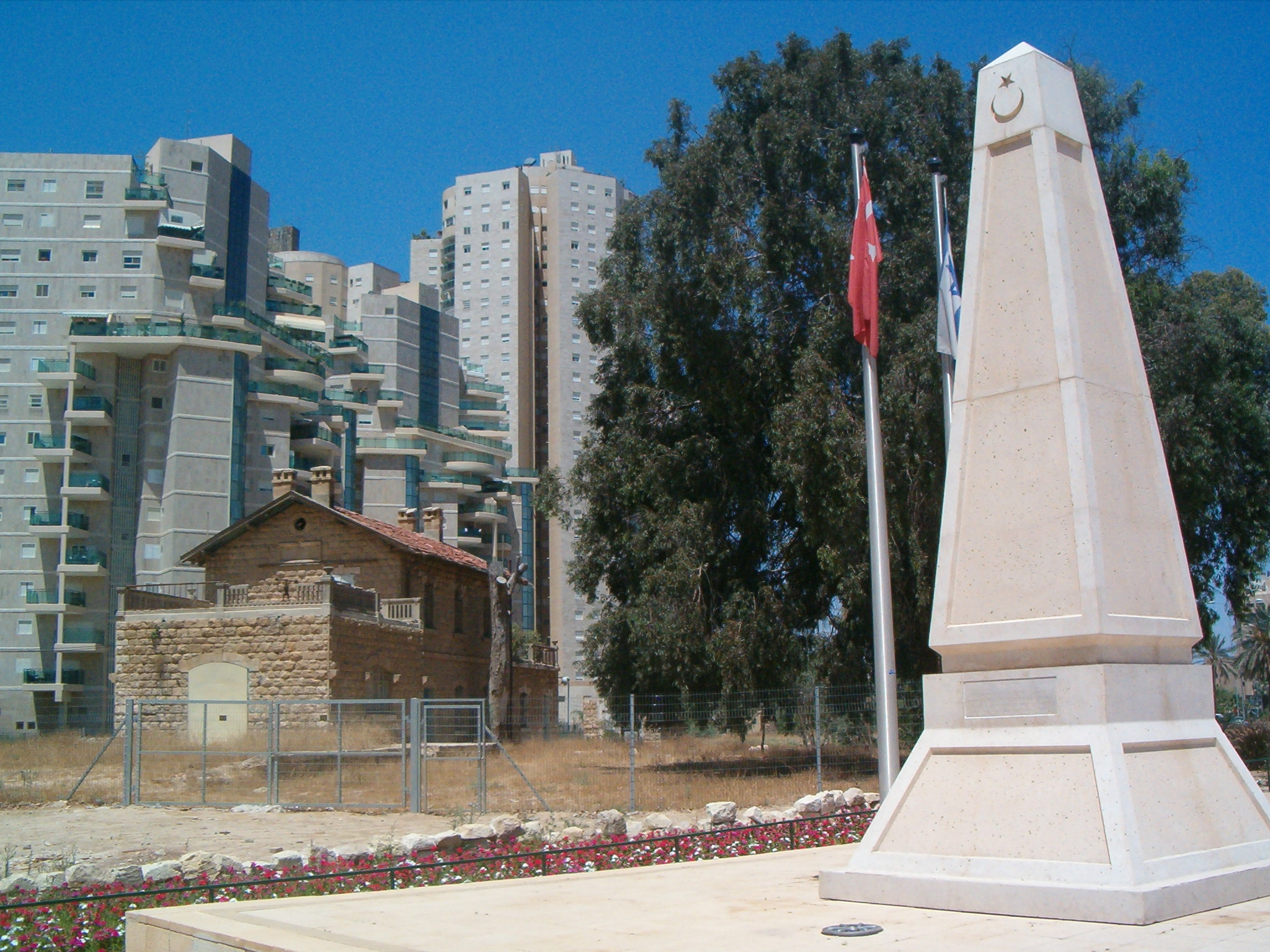
The Turkish soldiers monument near the station

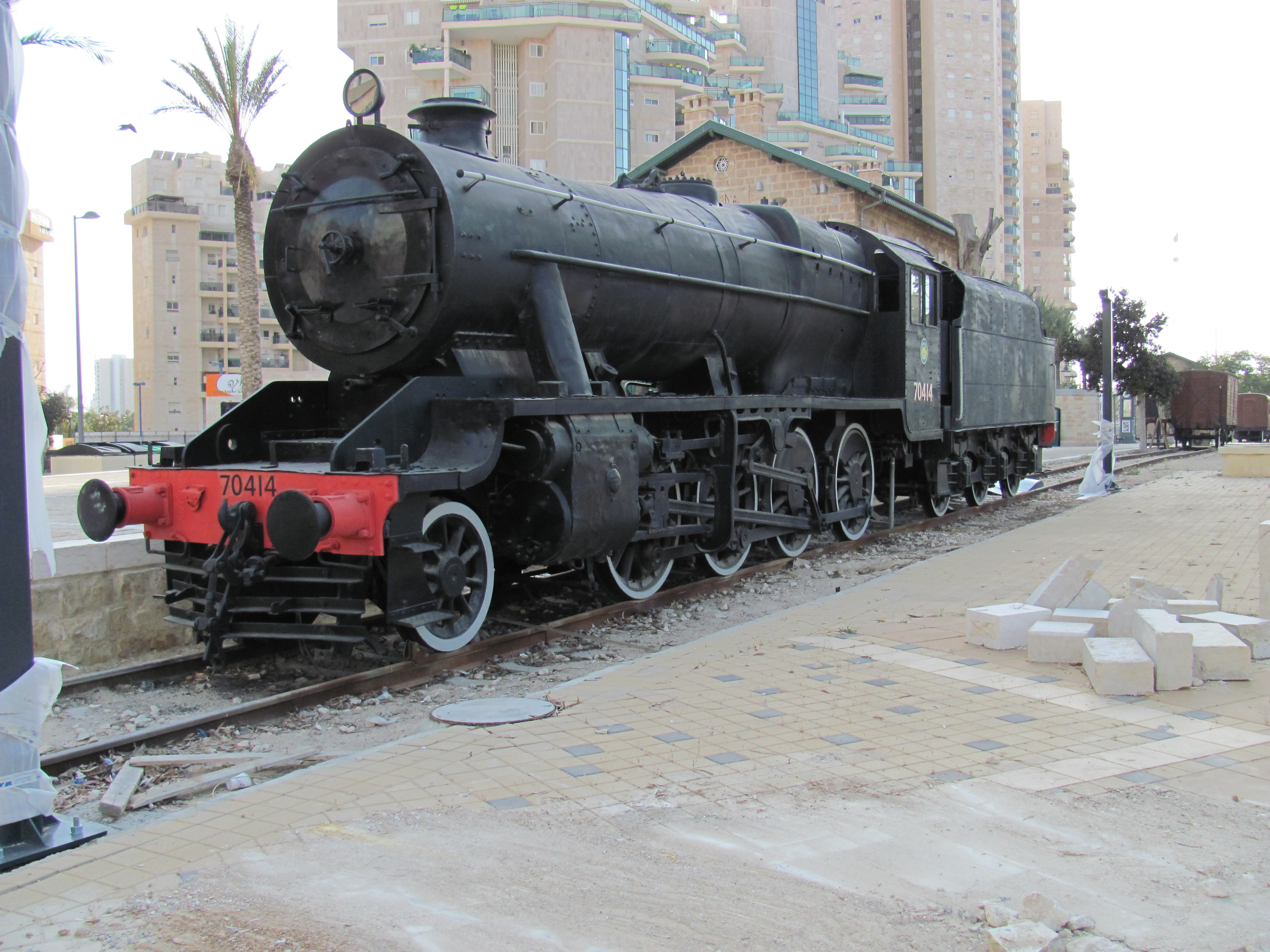
The TCDD 45151 Class locomotive on site while undergoing cosmetic restoration

Declared a National Historic Site in 1991, in 2013 the station complex and buildings were renovated and opened as small rail heritage museum.

The site's key exhibit is a TCDD 45151 Class steam locomotive, which was acquired by the municipality of Beersheba in December 2012 and cosmetically restored. Many examples of this type (Class 8F of British origin) were operated by Israel Railways in its early years. One of those, number 70414, was featured in a popular Hebrew song and a short film of the 1950s performed by Arik Lavie and written and directed by Haim Hefer about the last steam locomotive of Israel Railways, telling the story of its final journey from Beersheba to Israel Railways' workshops in Haifa Bay to be scrapped. This ballad is titled "The Locomotive Song" (שיר הקטר) and begins with the words "In the train station in Beersheba stood a locomotive, whose number was 70414...". In recognition of the famous song the locomotive on display is also numbered 70414; however, the train station in Beersheba referred to in the song is the Beersheba North railway station.

== See also ==
- Turkish soldiers' monument
