= USATC S200 Class =

Class of steam locomotives

USATC S200
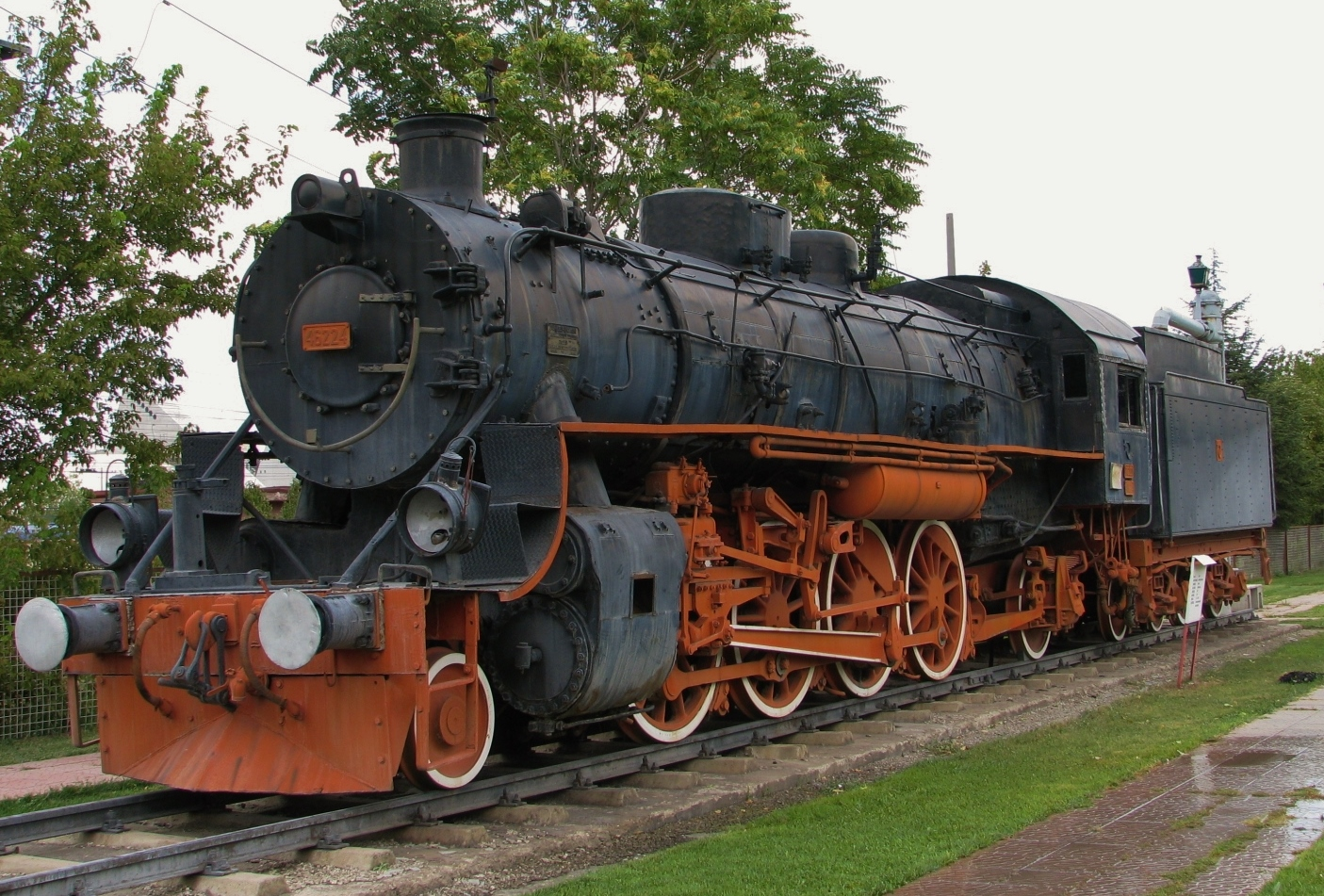
- No. 46224 at TCDD Open Air Steam Locomotive Museum, Ankara, Turkey
Type and origin
- Power type: Steam
- Builder: American Locomotive Company (60), Baldwin Locomotive Works (70), Lima Locomotive Works (70)
- Build date: 1941–1942
- Total produced: 200
Specifications
- Configuration
  - Whyte: 2-8-2
  - UIC: 1′D1′ h2
- Gauge: 4 ft 8 1/2 in (1,435 mm) standard gauge
- Leading dia.: 30 in (0.762 m)
- Driver dia.: 60 in (1.524 m)
- Trailing dia.: 42 in (1.067 m)
- Minimum curve: 21° (274.37 ft or 83.63 m)
- Length: 68 ft 4 in (20.83 m)
- Adhesive weight: 143,000 lb (65,000 kg)
- Loco weight: 200,000 lb (91,000 kg)
- Tender weight: 123,000 lb (56,000 kg)
- Fuel type: Coal or Oil
- Fuel capacity: 18,000 lb (8,200 kg) coal or 2,500 US gallons (9,500 L; 2,100 imp gal) oil
- Water cap.: 6,500 US gallons (25,000 L; 5,400 imp gal)
- Firebox
  - Grate area: 47 sq ft (4.4 m^{2})
- Boiler pressure: 200 psi (1.38 MPa)
- Heating surface
  - Firebox: 179 sq ft (16.6 m^{2})
  - Tubes and flues: 1,985 sq ft (184.4 m^{2})
  - Total surface: 2,164 sq ft (201.0 m^{2})
- Superheater
  - Heating area: 625 sq ft (58.1 m^{2})
- Cylinders: Two, outside
- Cylinder size: 21 in × 28 in (533 mm × 711 mm)
- Valve gear: Walschaerts
- Valve type: 10-inch (254 mm) piston valves
Performance figures
- Tractive effort: 35,000 lbf (155.7 kN)
- Factor of adh.: 4.08
Career
- Operators: USATC; War Department; TCDD; China Railway
- Numbers: USATC & WD: 1000–1199
- Locale: Middle East, Iran, Iraq, Turkey, Italy, China
- Preserved: 2
- Scrapped: 1959 (UK) 1959-1972 (Italy) 1973-1981 (Turkey) 1982-1983 (Iran) 1984-1986 (Iraq) 1988-1990 (China)
- Disposition: 2 preserved, all mostly scrapped

The United States Army Transportation Corps (USATC) S200 Class is a class of 2-8-2 "Mikado" type steam locomotive. They were introduced in 1941 and lent-leased to the United Kingdom for use in the Middle East during World War II.

== Service ==
=== Middle East ===
At least 85 S200s operated in the Middle East, including Egypt, Palestine and Lebanon. One was destroyed by fire at El Arish in Egypt in 1942. 29 of this batch was later supplied to Turkey where they became the TCDD 46201 Class. In 1946, another 24 were transferred to TCDD which added them to the same number series 46201–46253. 51 S200s built in 1942 served on the Trans-Iranian Railway, where they became Iranian class 42.

=== Europe ===
After the Allied invasion of Italy, 31 S200s were transferred and used there. 30 of these entered FS stock as FS Class 747 Nos. 747.001–747.030; the other one caught fire and was destroyed.

=== Asia ===
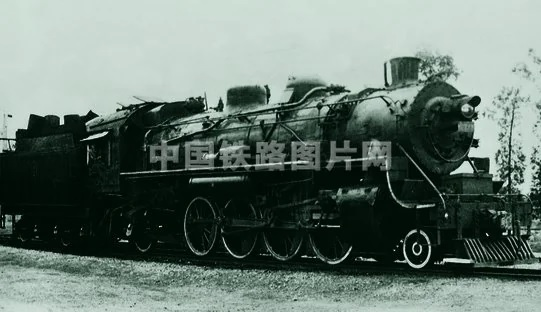
JF10 of China Railway

Thirty were donated to China by the UNRRA. China Railway designated these as class ㄇㄎ10 (MK10) in 1951, then reclassifying them as class 解放10 (JF10, Jiefang, "Liberation") and numbering them 3711−3740.

== Survivors ==
Two of the Turkish locomotives survive: 46224 at Ankara and 46244 at the Çamlık Railway Museum.
