= Sentetsu Mikani-class locomotive =

2-8-2 steam locomotive

Chosen Government Railway Mikani class (ミカニ) Korean National Railroad Mika2 class (미카2) Korean State Railway Migadu class (미가두)
Type and origin
- Power type: Steam
- Builder: ALCo
- Build date: 1919
- Total produced: 12
Specifications
- Configuration
  - Whyte: 2-8-2
- Gauge: 1,435 mm (4 ft 8 1/2 in)
- Driver dia.: 1,450 mm (57.09 in)
- Length: 22,094 mm (869.8 in)
- Width: 3,023 mm (9 ft 11.0 in)
- Height: 4,254 mm (13 ft 11.5 in)
- Loco weight: 93.40 t (91.92 long tons)
- Tender weight: 57.50 t (56.59 long tons)
- Fuel capacity: 9.4 t (9.3 long tons)
- Water cap.: 22.7 m^{3} (6,000 US gal)
- Firebox
  - Grate area: 4.45 m^{2} (47.9 sq ft)
- Boiler
  - Small tubes: 164 x 51 mm (2.0 in)
  - Large tubes: 28 x 137 mm (5.4 in)
- Boiler pressure: 13.0 kgf/cm^{2} (185 psi)
- Heating surface
  - Firebox: 17.50 m^{2} (188.4 sq ft)
  - Tubes: 222.30 m^{2} (2,392.8 sq ft)
  - Total surface: 239.80 m^{2} (2,581.2 sq ft)
- Superheater
  - Heating area: 69.00 m^{2} (742.7 sq ft)
- Cylinders: 2
- Cylinder size: 620 mm × 711 mm (24.409 in × 27.992 in)
- Valve gear: Walschaerts
Performance figures
- Maximum speed: 70 km/h (43 mph)
- Tractive effort: 204.0 kN (45,900 lb_{f})
Career
- Operators: Chosen Government Railway; Korean National Railroad; Korean State Railway
- Class: Sentetsu: ミカニ; KNR: 미카2; KSR: 미가두
- Number in class: Sentetsu: 12; KNR: at least 1 KSR: at least 1
- Numbers: Sentetsu: ミカニ1–ミカニ12; KNR: see text KSR: 62xx (see text)
- Delivered: 1919

The Mikani-class (ミカニ) locomotives were a group of steam tender locomotives of the Chosen Government Railway (Sentetsu) with 2-8-2 wheel arrangement. The "Mika" name came from the American naming system for steam locomotives, under which locomotives with 2-8-2 wheel arrangement were called "Mikado" in honour of the Emperor of Japan, as the first 2-8-2 locomotives in the world were built for Japan.

Of all Mika classes, 131 went to the Korean National Railroad in South Korea and 292 to the Korean State Railway in North Korea. Of these 423 locomotives, 356 were from Sentetsu; the other 67 were South Manchuria Railway Mikai-class engines on loan to Sentetsu along with Mika-type locomotives which had previously belonged to the twelve privately owned railways in Korea before 1945. Not included in this number, however, are the six SMR Mikai-class locomotives that were assigned to SMR's Rajin depot for operation on SMR's lines in northeastern Korea, and the eight SMR Mikaro-class locomotives likewise assigned to the Rajin depot; these fourteen locomotives were taken over by the Korean State Railway. Despite the DPRK government's extensive anti-Japanese propaganda, the railway nevertheless continues to use the "Mika" name officially for these locomotives even though it refers to the Japanese emperor.

== Description ==
By the late 1910s, existing multipurpose locomotives were proving insufficient for the increasingly heavy freight trains being run in Korea. To fill the need for dedicated freight locomotives, in 1919 Sentetsu imported twelve Mikai-class and twelve Mikani-class locomotives from the United States in 1919.

The second of the original two groups of 2-8-2 locomotives to be delivered to Sentetsu in 1919 was the Mikani class built by ALCo in 1919. Originally numbered ミカニ801–ミカニ812, they became ミカニ1–ミカニ12 in Sentetsu's 1938 general renumbering.

== Postwar ==
After the partition of Korea, both the Korean State Railway in the North and the Korean National Railroad in the South operated Mikani class locomotives, but the exact disposition between the two is uncertain. However, it is known that ミカニ4 went to the Korean State Railway after the 1947 division of Sentetsu assets. It was destroyed during the Korean War, then captured by the US Army and taken south to strip for parts. In the South they were designated 미카2 (Mika2) class, in the North they were initially designated 미가두 (Migadu) class, and later renumbered in the 6200 series.

== Construction ==
Original number	1938–1945 number	Builder	Year	Postwar owner	Postwar number	Notes
ミカイ801	ミカイ1	ALCo	1919	?	?	
ミカイ802	ミカイ2	ALCo	1919	?	?	
ミカイ803	ミカイ3	ALCo	1919	?	?	
ミカイ804	ミカイ4	ALCo	1919	KSR	미가두4	Destroyed during the Korean War, captured and taken south to strip for parts.
ミカイ805	ミカイ5	ALCo	1919	?	?	
ミカイ806	ミカイ6	ALCo	1919	?	?	
ミカイ807	ミカイ7	ALCo	1919	?	?	
ミカイ808	ミカイ8	ALCo	1919	?	?	
ミカイ809	ミカイ9	ALCo	1919	?	?	
ミカイ810	ミカイ10	ALCo	1919	?	?	
ミカイ811	ミカイ11	ALCo	1919	?	?	
ミカイ812	ミカイ12	ALCo	1919	?	?	
