= Sentetsu Mikashi-class locomotive =

2-8-2 steam locomotive

Chosen Government Railway Mikashi class (ミカシ) Korean National Railroad Mika4 class (미카4) Korean State Railway Miganŏ class (미가너)
Type and origin
- Power type: Steam
- Builder: Kawasaki
- Build date: 1939–1942
- Total produced: 24
Specifications
- Configuration
  - Whyte: 2-8-2
- Gauge: 1,435 mm (4 ft 8 1/2 in)
- Driver dia.: 1,370 mm (54 in)
- Length: 21,168 mm (833.4 in)
- Width: 2,995 mm (9 ft 9.9 in)
- Height: 4,244 mm (13 ft 11.1 in)
- Loco weight: 88.29 t (86.90 long tons)
- Tender weight: 58.48 t (57.56 long tons)
- Fuel capacity: 9.6 t (9.4 long tons) (1st); 12.0 t (11.8 long tons)
- Water cap.: 24.0 m^{3} (6,300 US gal) (1st); 28.0 m^{3} (7,400 US gal)
- Firebox
  - Grate area: 4.57 m^{2} (49.2 sq ft)
- Boiler
  - Small tubes: 139 x 51 mm (2.0 in)
  - Large tubes: 24 x 137 mm (5.4 in)
- Boiler pressure: 14.0 kgf/cm^{2} (199 psi)
- Heating surface
  - Firebox: 19.10 m^{2} (205.6 sq ft)
  - Tubes: 152.40 m^{2} (1,640.4 sq ft)
  - Total surface: 171.90 m^{2} (1,850.3 sq ft)
- Superheater
  - Heating area: 42.80 m^{2} (460.7 sq ft)
- Cylinders: 2
- Cylinder size: 530 mm × 710 mm (20.866 in × 27.953 in)
- Valve gear: Walschaerts
Performance figures
- Maximum speed: 70 km/h (43 mph)
- Tractive effort: 170.0 kN (38,200 lb_{f})
Career
- Operators: Chosen Government Railway; Korean National Railroad; Korean State Railway
- Class: Sentetsu: ミカシ; KNR: 미카4; KSR: 미가너
- Number in class: Sentetsu: 24
- Numbers: Sentetsu: ミカシ1–ミカシ24; KNR: see text KSR: 64xx (see text)
- Delivered: 1939–1942
- Data from the nearly identical Mantetsu Mikaro-class locomotives.

The Mikashi-class (ミカシ) locomotives were a group of steam tender locomotives of the Chosen Government Railway (Sentetsu) with 2-8-2 wheel arrangement. The "Mika" name came from the American naming system for steam locomotives, under which locomotives with 2-8-2 wheel arrangement were called "Mikado" in honour of the Emperor of Japan, as the first 2-8-2 locomotives in the world were built for Japan.

Of all Mika classes, 131 went to the Korean National Railroad in South Korea and 292 to the Korean State Railway in North Korea. Of these 423 locomotives, 356 were from Sentetsu; the other 67 were South Manchuria Railway Mikai-class engines on loan to Sentetsu along with Mika-type locomotives which had previously belonged to the twelve privately owned railways in Korea before 1945. Not included in this number, however, are the six SMR Mikai-class locomotives that were assigned to SMR's Rajin depot for operation on SMR's lines in northeastern Korea, and the eight SMR Mikaro-class locomotives likewise assigned to the Rajin depot; these fourteen locomotives were taken over by the Korean State Railway. Despite the DPRK government's extensive anti-Japanese propaganda, the railway nevertheless continues to use the "Mika" name officially for these locomotives even though it refers to the Japanese emperor.

== Description ==
The Mikashi class locomotives were very similar to the South Manchuria Railway's Mikaro-class locomotives. 24 were built by Kawasaki between 1939 and 1942, numbered ミカシ1 through ミカシ24.

== Postwar ==
The exact distribution of the Mikashi-class locomotives after the partition of Korea is uncertain, but they were operated by both the Korean National Railroad in the South and by the Korean State Railway in the North.

=== Korean National Railroad 미카4 (Mika4) class ===
In Korean National Railroad service in South Korea the Mikashi class was known as the 미카4 (Mika4) class. The numbers of the locomotives operated by the KNR is uncertain, however 미카4-23 is known to have been operated by the KNR.

=== Korean State Railway 미가너 (Miganŏ)/6400 series ===
The Korean State Railway initially designated its Mikashi class locomotives as 미가너 (Miganŏ) class, retaining the previous serial identity, and later renumbered them in the 6400 number series. The identities of two Mikashis that went north after the partition are known for certain - ミカシ9 and ミカシ15: ミカシ9 ended up in the North and was operated by the Korean State Railway as 미가너9, but was destroyed during the Korean War; it was subsequently captured by Southern forces and taken south; 6415 (previously 미가너15) was still in daily service in 2004 around Taegŏn, Ŭnsan and Changsŏn'gang on the P'yŏngra Line.
