= Sentetsu Mikai-class locomotive =

2-8-2 steam locomotive

Chosen Government Railway Mikai class (ミカイ) Korean National Railroad Mika1 class (미카1) Korean State Railway Migaha class (미가하)
Type and origin
- Power type: Steam
- Builder: Baldwin
- Build date: 1919
- Total produced: 12
Specifications
- Configuration
  - Whyte: 2-8-2
- Gauge: 1,435 mm (4 ft 8 1/2 in)
- Driver dia.: 1,450 mm (57.09 in)
- Length: 22,032 mm (867.4 in)
- Width: 3,023 mm (9 ft 11.0 in)
- Height: 4,383 mm (14 ft 4.6 in)
- Loco weight: 89.75 t (88.33 long tons)
- Tender weight: 57.50 t (56.59 long tons)
- Fuel capacity: 9.4 t (9.3 long tons)
- Water cap.: 22.7 m^{3} (6,000 US gal)
- Firebox
  - Grate area: 4.39 m^{2} (47.3 sq ft)
- Boiler
  - Small tubes: 168 x 51 mm (2.0 in)
  - Large tubes: 26 x 137 mm (5.4 in)
- Boiler pressure: 13.0 kgf/cm^{2} (185 psi)
- Heating surface
  - Firebox: 17.70 m^{2} (190.5 sq ft)
  - Tubes: 221.50 m^{2} (2,384.2 sq ft)
  - Total surface: 239.20 m^{2} (2,574.7 sq ft)
- Superheater
  - Heating area: 64.00 m^{2} (688.9 sq ft)
- Cylinders: 2
- Cylinder size: 559 mm × 711 mm (22.0 in × 28.0 in)
- Valve gear: Walschaerts
Performance figures
- Maximum speed: 70 km/h (43 mph)
- Tractive effort: 170.0 kN (38,200 lb_{f})
Career
- Operators: Chosen Government Railway; Korean National Railroad; Korean State Railway
- Class: Sentetsu: ミカイ; KNR: 미카1; KSR: 미가하
- Number in class: Sentetsu: 12; KNR: 9 KSR: 3
- Numbers: Sentetsu: ミカイ1–ミカイ12; KNR: see text KSR: 60xx (see text)
- Delivered: 1919

The Mikai-class (ミカイ) locomotives were a group of steam tender locomotives of the Chosen Government Railway (Sentetsu) with 2-8-2 wheel arrangement. The "Mika" name came from the American naming system for steam locomotives, under which locomotives with 2-8-2 wheel arrangement were called "Mikado" in honour of the Emperor of Japan, as the first 2-8-2 locomotives in the world were built for Japan.

Of all Mika classes, 131 went to the Korean National Railroad in South Korea and 292 to the Korean State Railway in North Korea. Of these 423 locomotives, 356 were from Sentetsu; the other 67 were South Manchuria Railway Mikai-class engines on loan to Sentetsu along with Mika-type locomotives which had previously belonged to the twelve privately owned railways in Korea before 1945. Not included in this number, however, are the six SMR Mikai-class locomotives that were assigned to SMR's Rajin depot for operation on SMR's lines in northeastern Korea, and the eight SMR Mikaro-class locomotives likewise assigned to the Rajin depot; these fourteen locomotives were taken over by the Korean State Railway. Despite the DPRK government's extensive anti-Japanese propaganda, the railway nevertheless continues to use the "Mika" name officially for these locomotives even though it refers to the Japanese emperor.

== Description ==
By the late 1910s, existing multipurpose locomotives were proving insufficient for the increasingly heavy freight trains being run in Korea. To fill the need for dedicated freight locomotives, in 1919 Sentetsu imported twelve Mikai-class and twelve Mikani-class locomotives from the United States in 1919.

The Mikai class was one of the original two groups of 2-8-2 locomotives to be delivered to Sentetsu in 1919, the other being the Mikani class built by ALCo. Built by Baldwin in 1919, the Mikai class were used primarily on the Gyeongui Line. Originally numbered ミカイ701-ミカイ712, in Sentetsu's general renumbering of 1938 they became ミカイ1-ミカイ12

== Postwar ==
After the division of Sentetsu's assets in 1947, three remained in the North with the Korean State Railway as class 미가하 (Migaha) and later renumbered in the 6000 series, and nine in the South with the Korean National Railroad as class 미카1 (Mika1);

Some of the KNR's Mika1s were rebuilt in the early 1950s by Kawasaki to use lignite as fuel, becoming the KNR Mika6 (미카6) class.

Both the KNR and the Korean State Railway operated Mikai class locomotives that formerly belonged to the South Manchuria Railway (Mantetsu). These were very distinct from the Sentetsu Mikai class, but in both North and South they were grouped together with the Sentetsu Mikais as class Migaha and Mika1 respectively.

== Construction ==
Original number	1938–1945 number	Builder	Year	Postwar owner	Postwar number	Notes
ミカイ701	ミカイ1	Baldwin	1919	KNR	미카1-1	Cannibalised for parts for 미카1-10 in 1953-1954.
ミカイ702	ミカイ2	Baldwin	1919	KNR	미카1-2	Rebuilt by Kawasaki in 1952.
ミカイ703	ミカイ3	Baldwin	1919	?	?	
ミカイ704	ミカイ4	Baldwin	1919	?	?	
ミカイ705	ミカイ5	Baldwin	1919	?	?	
ミカイ706	ミカイ6	Baldwin	1919	KSR	미가하6 (6006)	Appeared in the 1971 DPRK film, Son of an Engineer (기관사의 아들). Still in service in the early 2000s.
ミカイ707	ミカイ7	Baldwin	1919	KNR	미카1-7	
ミカイ708	ミカイ8	Baldwin	1919	KNR	미카1-8	Rebuilt by Kawasaki in 1952.
ミカイ709	ミカイ9	Baldwin	1919	?	?	
ミカイ710	ミカイ10	Baldwin	1919	KNR	미카1-10	Named "Mt. Tamalpias" (with incorrect spelling), used in the post-armistice prisoner exchange.
ミカイ711	ミカイ11	Baldwin	1919	?	?	
ミカイ712	ミカイ12	Baldwin	1919	?	?	
