= Sentetsu Mika class locomotives =

Sentetsu Mika-class
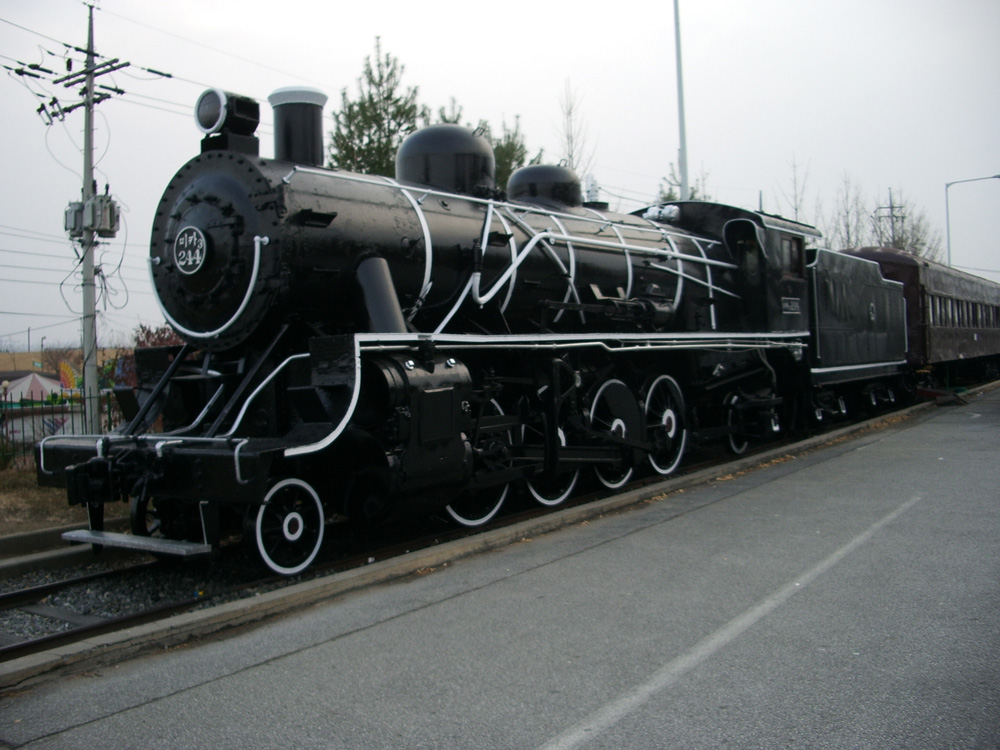
- KNR 미카3-244 preserved at Imjingak
Type and origin
- Power type: Steam
Specifications
- Configuration
  - Whyte: 2-8-2
- Gauge: 1,435 mm (4 ft 8 1/2 in)

The Mika (Japanese ミカ, Korean 미카) type was made up of four distinct classes of steam tender locomotives of the Chosen Government Railway (Sentetsu) with 2-8-2 wheel arrangement. The "Mika" name came from the American naming system for steam locomotives, under which locomotives with 2-8-2 wheel arrangement were called "Mikado" in honour of the Emperor of Japan, as the first 2-8-2 locomotives in the world were built for Japan.

There were four classes of the Mika type built for Sentetsu:

- Mikai
- Mikani
- Mikasa
- Mikashi

Of these, the Mikasa class was by far the most numerous. The Mikasa class was also used by the privately owned West Chosen Central Railway in Korea, and some were also exported to the Central China Railway, which after the war were used by the China Railway. Following the partition of Korea, these locomotives were all divided between the Korean National Railroad in the South and the Korean State Railway in the North;

In addition to the four classes built for Sentetsu, Sentetsu also operated around 54 Mantetsu Mikai-class locomotives taken on loan from the South Manchuria Railway (Mantetsu) and the Manchukuo National Railway

Of all Mika classes in Korea, including the 54 on loan to Sentetsu from Mantetsu and 13 owned by private railways, 131 went to the KNR and 292 to the Korean State Railway. Note that this number does not include the 14 Mantetsu Mikai and 8 Mikaro-class locomotives that were assigned to Mantetsu's Rajin depot in 1945 and were subsequently taken over by the Korean State Railway.

Despite the DPRK government's extensive anti-Japanese propaganda, the railway nevertheless continues to use the "Mika" name officially for these locomotives even though it refers to the Japanese emperor.
