= China Railways JF6 =

2-8-2 steam locomotive

China Railways JF6 (解放6) Mantetsu Mikaro class (ミカロ) Manchukuo National Mikaro class (ミカロ) North China Mikaro class (ミカロ) Korean State Railway Migayu class (미가유) Korean National RR Mika 1600 class (미카 1600호대) Vietnam Railways Giải Phóng 6 class
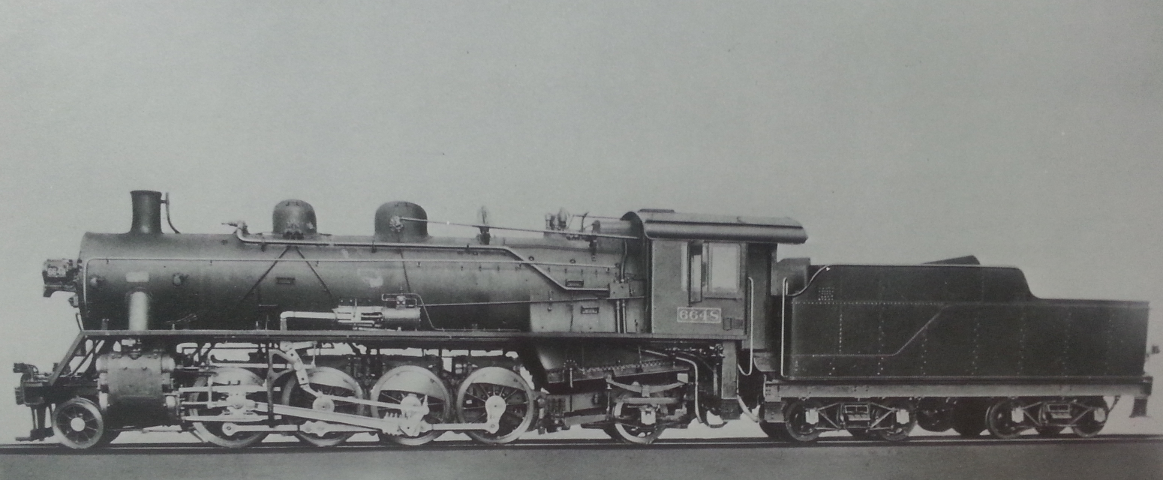
- Builder's photo of Manchukuo National Ry ミカロ6648
Type and origin
- Power type: Steam
- Builder: Kawasaki; Hitachi; Shahekou; Kisha Seizō; Nippon Sharyō; Shenyang Works (postwar)
- Total produced: 475 (1934−1959)
Specifications
- Configuration
  - Whyte: 2-8-2
- Gauge: 1,435 mm (4 ft 8 1/2 in)
- Driver dia.: 1,370 mm (54 in)
- Length: 21,200 mm (69 ft 7 in)
- Height: 4,244 mm (13 ft 11.1 in)
- Adhesive weight: Mikasa: 64.10 t (63.09 long tons); Mikaro: 66.26 t (65.21 long tons)
- Loco weight: Mikasa: 146.77 t (144.45 long tons)
- Tender weight: Mikasa: 87.10 t (85.72 long tons); Mikaro: 88.29 t (86.90 long tons)
- Fuel type: Coal
- Tender cap.: 9.60 t (9.4 long tons) (coal), 24 m^{3} (6,300 US gal) (water)
- Firebox
  - Grate area: Mikasa: 4.07 m^{2} (43.8 sq ft); Mikaro: 4.57 m^{2} (49.2 sq ft)
- Boiler pressure: 14.0 kgf/cm^{2} (199 psi)
- Cylinders: Two, outside
- Cylinder size: 530 mm × 710 mm (21 in × 28 in) bore x stroke
Performance figures
- Maximum speed: 80 km/h (50 mph)
- Power output: 1,258 hp (938 kW) (at wheels)
- Tractive effort: 240.3 kN (54,000 lb_{f})
Career
- Operators: South Manchuria Railway; Manchukuo National Railway; North China Transport; China Railway; Korean State Railway; Korean National Railroad; Vietnam Railways
- Class: SMR: ミカサ (Mikasa), ミカロ (Mikaro); MNR: ミカロ (Mikaro); NCTC: ミカロ (Mikaro); CR: ㄇㄎ陸 (MK6; 1951−59); CR: 解放6 (JF6; 1959−end); KSR: 미가유 (Migayu)/6600 srs KNR: 미카형 1600호대 (Mika6); VR: Giải Phóng 6
- Number in class: SMR: 43 (Mikasa), 58 (Mikaro); MNR: 48 (國小ミカ), 171 (新國小ミカ); NCTC: ~120; CR: 475; KSR: 78; KNR: 5 VR: 60
- Numbers: 3001–3043, JF6 3044–3100, 3101–3149, 3150–3475
- Preserved: 2
- Disposition: 2 preserved, remainder scrapped

The China Railways JF6 (解放6, Jiěfàng, "liberation") class steam locomotive was a class of 2-8-2 "Mikado" type steam locomotives for freight trains operated by the China Railway. They were originally built in Japan and Manchukuo between 1934 and 1944 for the South Manchuria Railway (Mantetsu), the Manchukuo National Railway, and the North China Transportation Company.

== History ==
=== Mantetsu Mikasa class (ミカサ) ===
Needing a replacement for the Sorii-class locomotives transferred to the Manchukuo National in 1933, Mantetsu ordered the construction of replacements for use on light freight trains and for shunting duties. The result was the Mikasa (ミカサ) class, which was a smaller, lighter version of the Mikai-class 2-8-2s already in service, and 43 were built in Japan for Mantetsu in 1934 by Kawasaki, Kisha Seizō, Hitachi, and Nippon Sharyō. Numbered 1400 through 1442, the last 22 - 1421 through 1442 - were built with a sloped tender designed to allow greater rearwards visibility during shunting operations. Later, some were fitted with a booster engine for use on mountainous lines.

26 of the design were built in the same year for the Manchukuo National, which designated them Mikaro (ミカロ) class. Numbered 6600 through 6625, these were known as the "National Small Mika" (國小ミカ), distinguishing them from the Mikana-class "National Big Mika" (国大ミカ) introduced the previous year. After some modifications to the design, another 22 were built in 1935 for the Manchukuo National; these were known as the "New National Small Mika" (新國小ミカ) and were numbered 6626 through 6647.

Under the unified classification system of 1938, the Mantetsu Mikasa and Mikaro classes, and the Manchukuo National Mikaro classes were grouped together and classified Mikaro class.

Owner	Class & numbers (1934–1938)	Class & numbers (1938–1945)	Builder	Year	Notes
Mantetsu	ミカサ1400–ミカサ1442	ミカロ1–ミカロ43	Kawasaki, Kisha Seizō, Hitachi, Nippon Sharyō	1934	Last 22 built with sloped tenders for shunting duties.
Manchukuo National	ミカロ6600–ミカロ6625	ミカロ501–ミカロ526	Kawasaki, Kisha Seizō, Hitachi, Nippon Sharyō	1934	"National Small Mika" (國小ミカ)
Manchukuo National	ミカロ6626–ミカロ6647	ミカロ527–ミカロ548	Kawasaki, Kisha Seizō, Hitachi, Nippon Sharyō	1935	"New National Small Mika" (新國小ミカ)

=== Mantetsu Mikaro class (ミカロ) ===
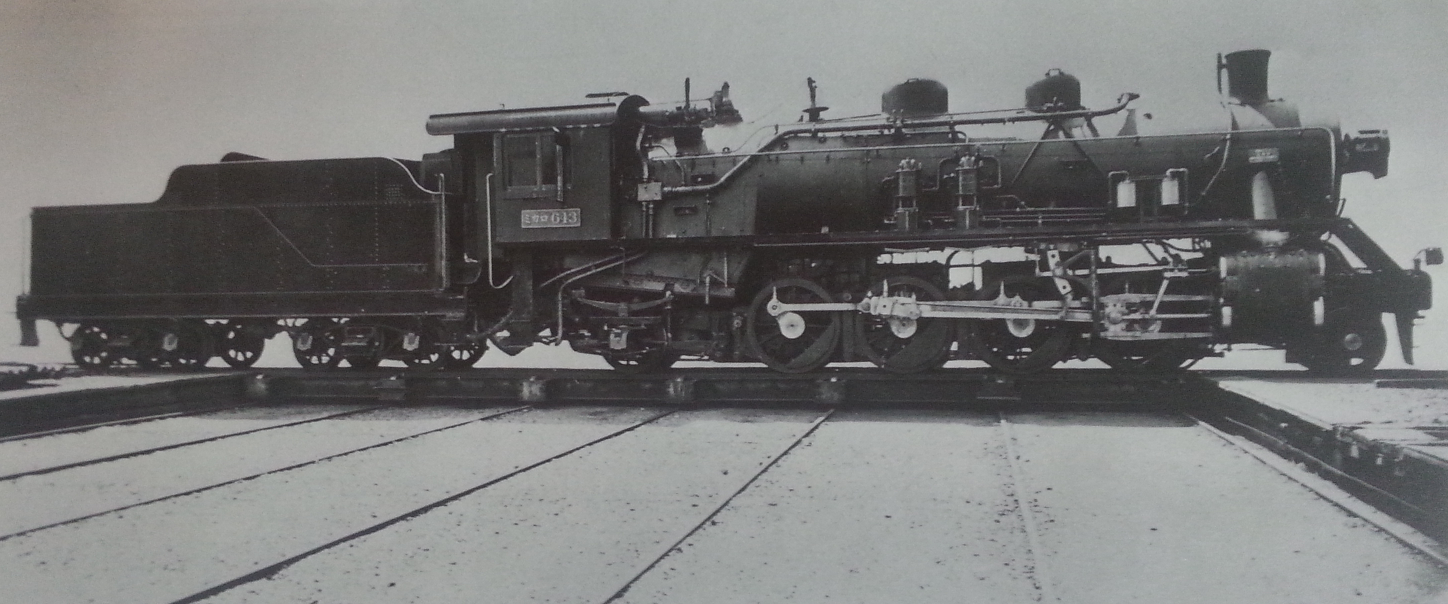
Builder's photo of Manchukuo National ミカロ643 - one of the five diverted to North China Transport

To operate on its North Chosen Line in the north-eastern part of Korea, Mantetsu ordered a number of locomotives designed to burn the low-calorie lignite found in abundance in Korea. To accomplish this, the area of the firegrate was increased by 0.5 m^{2} (5.4 sq ft) as compared to that of the Mikasa class. Along with the Puresa-class 2-6-2 tank locomotives and the Pashisa-class 4-6-2 passenger locomotives, Mantetsu's Mikaro (ミカロ) class formed the backbone of the power in use on the North Chosen Line. Although the Mikaro class was based on the Mikasa design, care was taken during the design process to maximise the number of parts shared between the Mikaro and Pashisa class locomotives.

The Mikaro class entered production in 1935, with 22 being built between then and 1938, for use on the North Chosen Line. As more were built after 1938, they were put into service on other Mantetsu lines as well, and between 1935 and 1944, a total of 58, initially numbered 1480 through 1499, 11400, and 11401, were built for Mantetsu by Kawasaki, Kisha Seizo, Nippon Sharyo, Mantetsu's Shahekou Works, and the Dalian Machine Works; these were the first locomotives built by the Dalian Machine Works.

The Manchukuo National also ordered the new design with the larger firegrate, taking delivery of 171 between 1936 and 1944. Like the Sorisa-class, they were fitted with a regauging device to allow operation on Russian 1,524 mm (5 ft 0 in) gauge lines, in anticipation of a possible Japanese invasion of the Soviet Far East. Given the Mikaro classification too and initially numbered 6648 through 6699 and 16600 through 16638, in the 1938 unified numbering system they became Mikaro class 549 through 629; the units built after the renumbering were numbered 630 through 639 and 645 through 724; the missing numbers, 640-644, are those that were assigned to locomotives that were diverted to the North China Transportation Company before they could be delivered to the Manchukuo National.

In addition to the five diverted from the Manchukuo National, 72 Mikaro class locomotives were built by Kisha Seizō for North China Transport in 1938−1939 and 1943−1944; North China Transport operated over 100 locomotives of the class.

A number of Mikaro-class locomotives were loaned to the West Chosen Central Railway in 1944–45 to alleviate power shortages on that line.

Owner	Class & numbers (1934–1938)	Class & numbers (1938–1945)	Builder	Year	Notes
Mantetsu	ミカロ1480–ミカロ1499 ミカロ11400−ミカロ11401	ミカロ44–ミカロ101	Kawasaki, Kisha Seizō, Hitachi, Nippon Sharyō, Shahekou, Dalian Machine	1935−1944	
Manchukuo National	ミカロ6648–ミカロ6699 ミカロ16600–ミカロ16638	ミカロ549–ミカロ639 ミカロ645–ミカロ724	Kawasaki, Kisha Seizō, Hitachi, Nippon Sharyō, Shahekou, Dalian	1936−1944	Variable gauge.
North China Transport	-	ミカロ1501–ミカロ1620	Kisha Seizō (72), others?	1938−1944	Estimated total of 120, 72 built by Kisha Seizō 1938−1939 and 1943−1944

=== Mikaku class (ミカク) ===
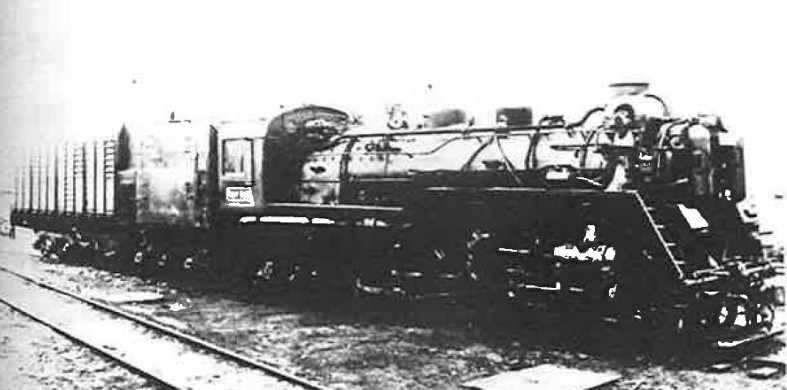
Builder's photo of ミカク501.

At the request of the Kwantung Army, the Dalian Machine Works (other sources say Mitsubishi's Kobe Shipyards) built a single experimental condenser version of the Mikaro class in 1941. This was designated the ミカク (Mikaku) class and numbered ミカク501, as a Manchukuo National unit. A flue gas turbine was installed in front of the locomotive's chimney, with the exhaust pipe leading to a condenser on the tender, where the steam was cooled down and recycled into water again, to allow for operations over long distances without having to take on water; this was a major concern in the northern part of Manchuria, where it was difficult to secure water for the locomotives. In tests, Mikaku 501 recorded 1,600 km (990 mi) without taking on more water, but the design was never put into production.

== Postwar ==
=== China Railways 解放6 (JF6) class ===
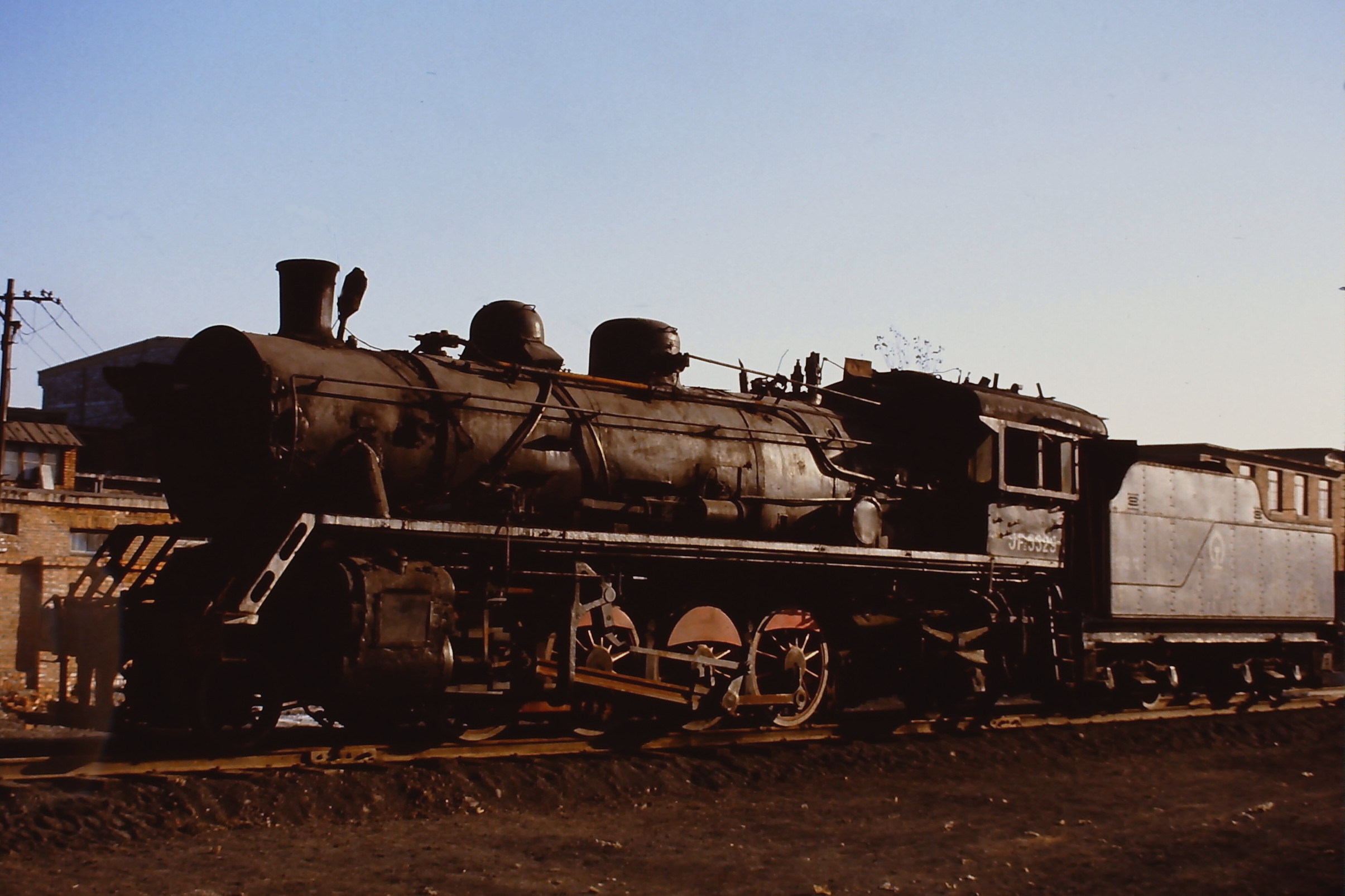
JF6-3329 at the Shenyang Steam Locomotive Museum

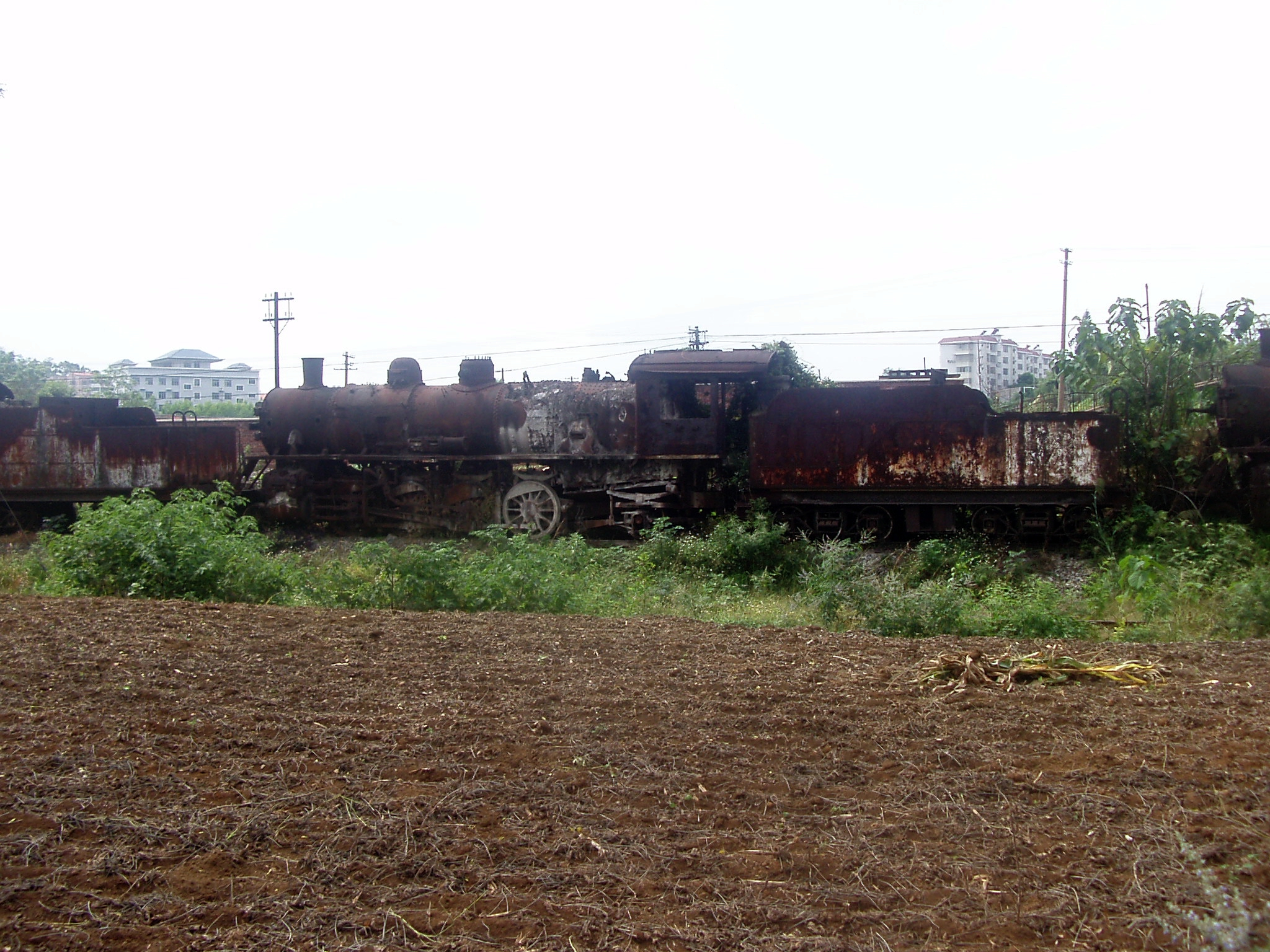
A JF6 Steam Locomotives in Heshan, Laibin, China, 2014

Of the 320 Mikaro class locomotives owned by Mantetsu and the Manchukuo National Railway, at the end of the Pacific War 20 were assigned to the Dairen Port Railway Bureau, 38 to the Mukden Bureau, 32 to the Jinzhou Bureau, 68 to the Mudanjiang Bureau, 29 to the Harbin Bureau, and 50 to the Qiqihar Bureau, whilst a further 75 were loaned out to other railways in China. These 312 locomotives were handed over to the Republic of China Railways in 1945; the remaining eight were on loan to the West Chosen Central Railway and ended up in North Korea.

After the establishment of the People's Republic of China, China Railways designated these the ㄇㄎ陸 (MK6) class in 1951, and in 1959 they were reclassified 解放6 (JF6) class; all former Mika-class locomotives were grouped together in the 解放 Class (Jiěfàng, "liberation"). A final batch of five JF6 were built in China between 1958 and 1960. The Mikaro class locomotives inherited from Mantetsu, the Manchukuo National and North China Transport, along with the five built new after the war, were numbered by China Railways in the 3001−3475 range. Although Chinese sources quote a number series of JF6 3001−3600, 3475 is the highest number to have been reported. It is probable that the last 120 locos were never built as the highest number reported, JF6 3475, is one of the final batch and carries Shenyang 1959 plates.

Those in industrial use were active until the late 1990s.

The JF6 was the predecessor of the more modern SY class, which was a further development of the JF6 design.

Currently, JF6 3022 is preserved at the China Railway Museum in Beijing, whilst JF6 3329 is preserved at the Shenyang Steam Locomotive Museum.

=== Korean State Railway 미가유 (Migayu) class/6600 series ===
Due to locomotive shortages, a number (believed to be eight) of Mikaro class locomotives were loaned from Mantetsu to the West Chosen Central Railway; these were taken over by the Korean State Railway of North Korea after the end of the war. In addition to these, the Korean State Railway also received around 70 JF class locomotives, including JF6s, from China as aid during the Korean War. Regardless of origin, the Mikaro class locomotives were initially designated 미가유 class (Migayu), and later renumbered in the 6600 series.

Known Korean State Railway 미가유
KSR number	Mantetsu number (post-1938)	Mantetsu number (pre-1938)	Builder	Year built	Notes
미가유18 (6618)	ミカロ18	ミカサ1417	Japan	1934	Regular tender. Operational on the Tŏksŏng Line in 2004.
미가유21 (6621)	ミカロ21	ミカサ1422	Japan	1934	Sloped tender. Operational on the Tŏksŏng Line prior to 2004.
미가유28 (6628)	ミカロ28	ミカサ1429	Japan	1934	Regular tender. Operational in Ch'ŏngjin in 2019.

=== Korean National Railroad 미카6 (Mika6) class ===
In 1934, sentetsu ordered ten Mikaro-class locomotives for the Korean National Railroad of South Korea from Kisha Seizō; These, together with the former Sentetsu Mika1 and Mika2 class locomotives that the KNR had converted to run on lignite in the early 1950s, were designated Mika6 (미카6) class by the KNR.

=== Vietnam Railways Giải Phóng 6 (GP6) class ===
During the Vietnam War, China supplied around sixty JF6 class locomotives to the Vietnam Railways as aid, which designated them class Giải Phóng 6 ("liberation"). Two dumped locos at Laibin, (Note: Actually three JF6s were dumped in Heshan.) are said to be ex-Vietnam.

== See also ==
- China Railways JF
- China Railways SY
