= China Railways JF1 =

2-8-2 steam locomotive

China Railways JF1 (解放1) Mantetsu Mikai class (ミカイ) Manchukuo National Mikai class (ミカイ) North China Transport Mikai class (ミカイ) Central China Railway KD100 class North Chosen Colonial Railway Class 1 Korean State Railway Migaha class (미가하) Korean National RR Mika1 class (미카1) Korean National RR Mika5 class (미카5) US Army Transportation Corps 9400 srs
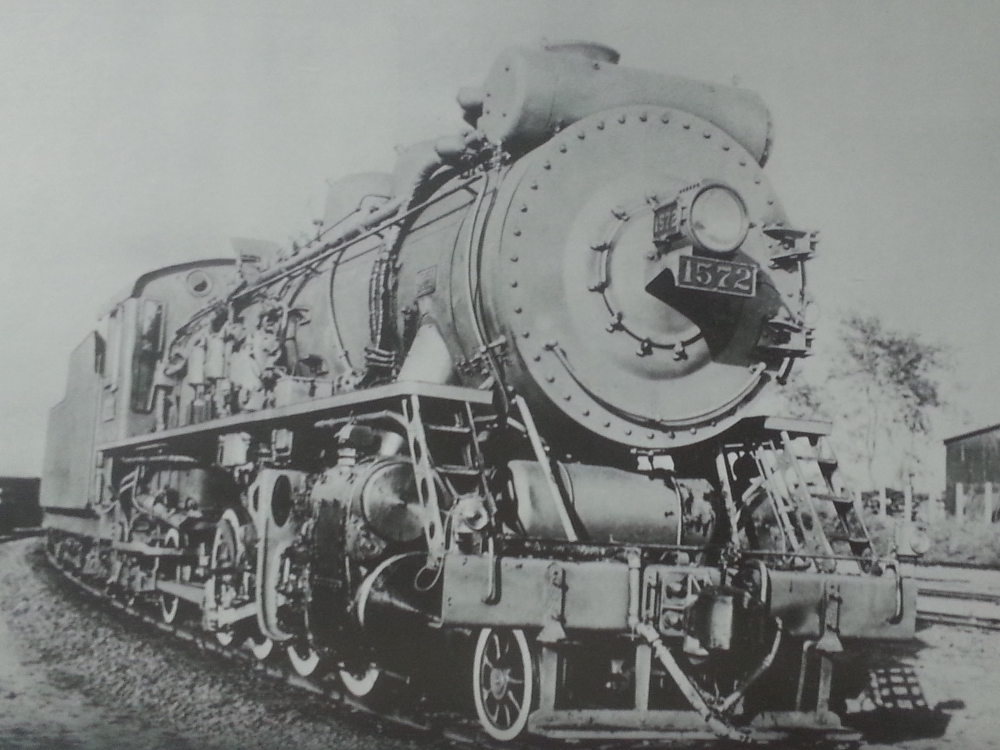
- Mantetsu ミカコ1572, later ミカイ73, finally China Rys JF1 73
Type and origin
- Power type: Steam
- Builder: ALCO (Schenectady); Shahekou; Kawasaki; Kisha Seizō; Nippon Sharyō; Hitachi; Sifang; Dalian; Qiqihar; Taiyuan; Mitsubishi (postwar)
- Build date: 1918−1928 (Mikai); 1933−1935 (国大ミカ); 1935−1945 (Mikako); 1950−1960 (JF1)
- Total produced: 70 (Mikai); 77 (国大ミカ); 271 (Mikako); 709 (新国大ミカ); 409 (NCTC Mikai); 19 (KD100); 12 (NCCR); 475 (JF1); 44 (미카5); Total: 2,095
Specifications
- Configuration
  - Whyte: 2-8-2
- Gauge: 1,435 mm (4 ft 8 1/2 in) standard gauge
- Driver dia.: 1,370 mm (54 in)
- Length: 23,750 mm (77 ft 11 in) (Mikako); 21,906 mm (71 ft 10 1/2 in) (新国大ミカ/JF1); 22,634 mm (74 ft 3 1/8 in) (JF1 mod)
- Height: 4,510 mm (14 ft 9 1/2 in) (JF1)
- Axle load: 20.00 t (19.68 long tons; 22.05 short tons)
- Adhesive weight: 76.17 t (74.97 long tons; 83.96 short tons) (Mikai); 78.62 t (77.38 long tons; 86.66 short tons) (国大ミカ); 79.88 t (78.62 long tons; 88.05 short tons) (Mikako); 79.94 t (78.68 long tons; 88.12 short tons) (新国大ミカ/JF1)
- Loco weight: 98.72 t (97.16 long tons; 108.82 short tons) (Mikai); 102.27 t (100.65 long tons; 112.73 short tons) (国大ミカ); 103.10 t (101.47 long tons; 113.65 short tons) (Mikako); 103.85 t (102.21 long tons; 114.48 short tons) (新国大ミカ/JF1)
- Total weight: 185.11 t (182.19 long tons; 204.05 short tons) (Mikai); 174.85 t (172.09 long tons; 192.74 short tons) (JF1)
- Fuel type: Coal
- Fuel capacity: 14.00 t (13.78 long tons; 15.43 short tons)
- Water cap.: 30.00 m^{3} (7,930 US gal; 6,600 imp gal)
- Tender cap.: 9.60 t (9.4 long tons; 10.6 short tons) (coal), 24 m^{3} (6,300 US gal; 5,300 imp gal) (water)
- Firebox
  - Grate area: 5.06 m^{2} (54.5 sq ft) (Mikai/国大ミカ/新国大ミカ); 5.08 m^{2} (54.7 sq ft) (Mikako); 5.09 m^{2} (54.8 sq ft) (JF1)
- Boiler pressure: 13.4 kgf/cm^{2} (191 psi; 1,314 kPa) (Mikai/国大ミカ); 14.0 kgf/cm^{2} (199 psi; 1,373 kPa) (Mikako/新国大ミカ/JF1)
- Heating surface: 337.79 m^{2} (3,635.9 sq ft) (Mikai); 338.10 m^{2} (3,639.3 sq ft) (国大ミカ); 274.30 m^{2} (2,952.5 sq ft) (Mikako/新国大ミカ); 299.80 m^{2} (3,227.0 sq ft) (Mikako 1575−76); 282.11 m^{2} (3,036.6 sq ft) (JF1)
- Superheater: Type A (all types); Type E (Mikako 1575−1576)
- Cylinders: Two, outside
- Cylinder size: 584 mm × 711 mm (22.99 in × 27.99 in) (Mikai); 584 mm × 710 mm (22.99 in × 27.95 in) (国大ミカ); 580 mm × 710 mm (22.83 in × 27.95 in) (Mikako); 584 mm × 710 mm (22.99 in × 27.95 in) (新国大ミカ); 580 mm × 710 mm (22.83 in × 27.95 in) (JF1)
Performance figures
- Maximum speed: 80 km/h (50 mph)
- Power output: 1,545 hp (1,152 kW) (Mikai/国大ミカ); 1,545 hp (1,152 kW) (Mikako/新国大ミカ); 1,545 hp (1,152 kW) (JF1); 1,945 hp (1,450 kW) (JF1 mod) (at wheels)
- Tractive effort: 235.6 kN (53,000 lb_{f}) (JF1)
Career
- Operators: South Manchuria Railway; Manchukuo National Railway; North China Transport; Central China Railway; North Chosen Colonial; China Railway; Korean State Railway; Korean National Railroad
- Class: SMR: ミカイ (Mikai), ミカコ (Mikako); MNR: ミカ (Mika); ミカナ (Mikana); NCTC: ミカイ (Mikai); CCR: KD100; NCCR: 1 srs; CR: ㄇㄎ壹 (MK1; 1951−59); CR: 解放1 (JF1; 1959−end); KSR: 미가하/6000/6100 srs; KNR: 미카1 (Mika1), 미카5 (Mika5); USATC: 9400 srs
- Number in class: SMR Mikai: 70; SMR Mikako: 271; MNR 國大ミカ: 74; MNR 新國大ミカ: 709; NCTC Mikai: 409; CCR KD100: 19; NCCR: 22; CR: 2027; KSR: ?; KNR: 56; USATC: 56
- Numbers: SMR: ミカイ1−70 (Mikai); SMR: ミカイ71−341 (Mikako); MNR: ミカイ501−574 (國大ミカ); MNR: ミカイ575−1283 (新國大ミカ); NCTC: ミカイ1501−1909; CCR: KD10001−KD10019; NCCR: 1-22; CR: JF1 1−341 (ex Mantetsu Mikai); CR: JF1 342−500 (ex ?); CR: JF1 501−574 (國大ミカ); CR: JF1 575−1283 (新國大ミカ); CR: JF1 1284−1500 (ex ?); CR: JF1 1501−2100 (ex NCTC/CCR/etc); CR: JF1 2101−2500 (new build); CR: JF1 4001−4101 (new build); KSR: 미가하x, 60xx, 61xx; KNR: 미카1x, 미카5-1 − 미카5-56; USATC: 9401−9432, others
- Preserved: 13
- Disposition: 13 preserved (9 in China, 4 in South Korea), remainder scrapped

The China Railways JF1 (解放1, Jiěfàng, "liberation") class steam locomotive was a class of 2-8-2 "Mikado" type steam locomotives for freight trains operated by the China Railway. They were originally built in the United States, Japan and Manchukuo between 1918 and 1945 for the South Manchuria Railway (Mantetsu), the Manchukuo National Railway, the North China Transportation Company, and the Central China Railway. After the end of the Pacific War, they were taken over by the China Railway, the Korean State Railway in North Korea and by the Korean National Railroad in South Korea, and more were built in China after 1949 for the China Railway, which ultimately operated over 2,000 of the type.

As well, more were built in Japan for the US Army Transportation Corps during the Korean War; these were later taken over by the Korean National Railroad. Similarly, China supplied some to the Korean State Railway as war aid.

== History ==
=== Mantetsu Mikai (ミカイ) and MNR "Big Mika" (國大ミカ) classes ===
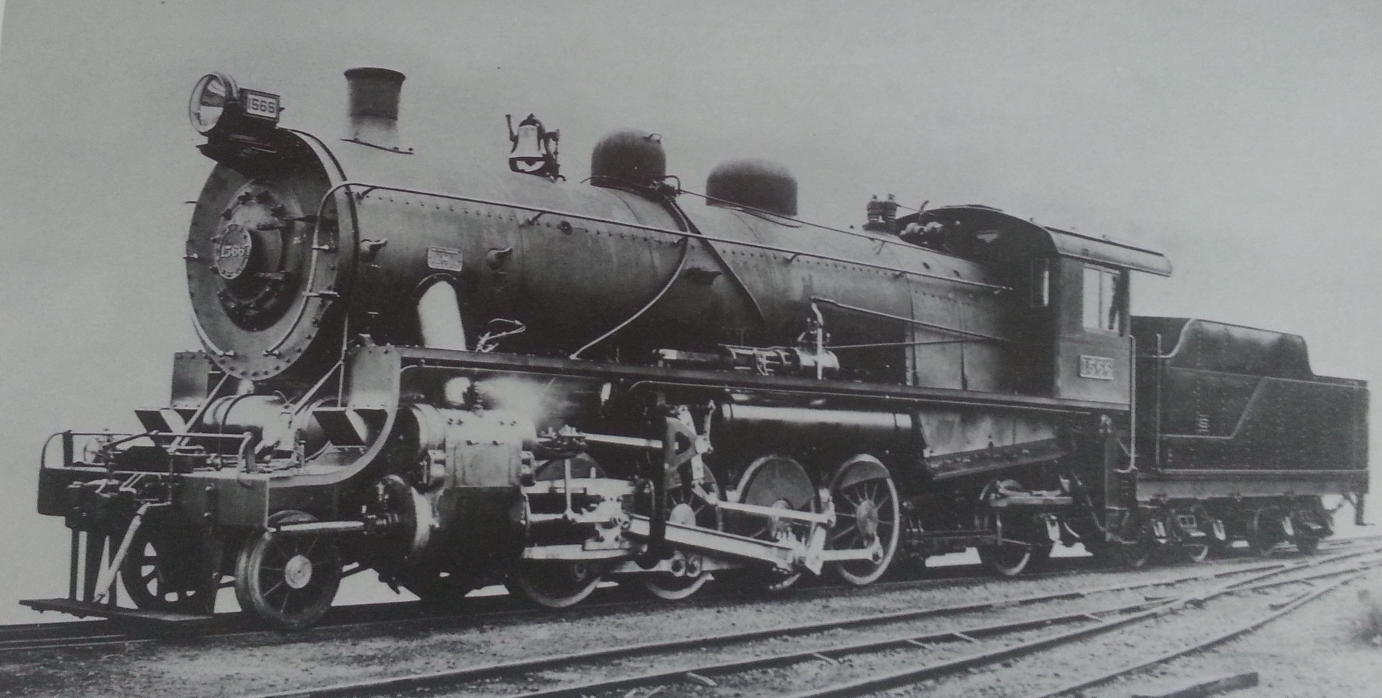
Mantetsu ミカイ1566, later ミカイ40, finally China Rys JF1 40

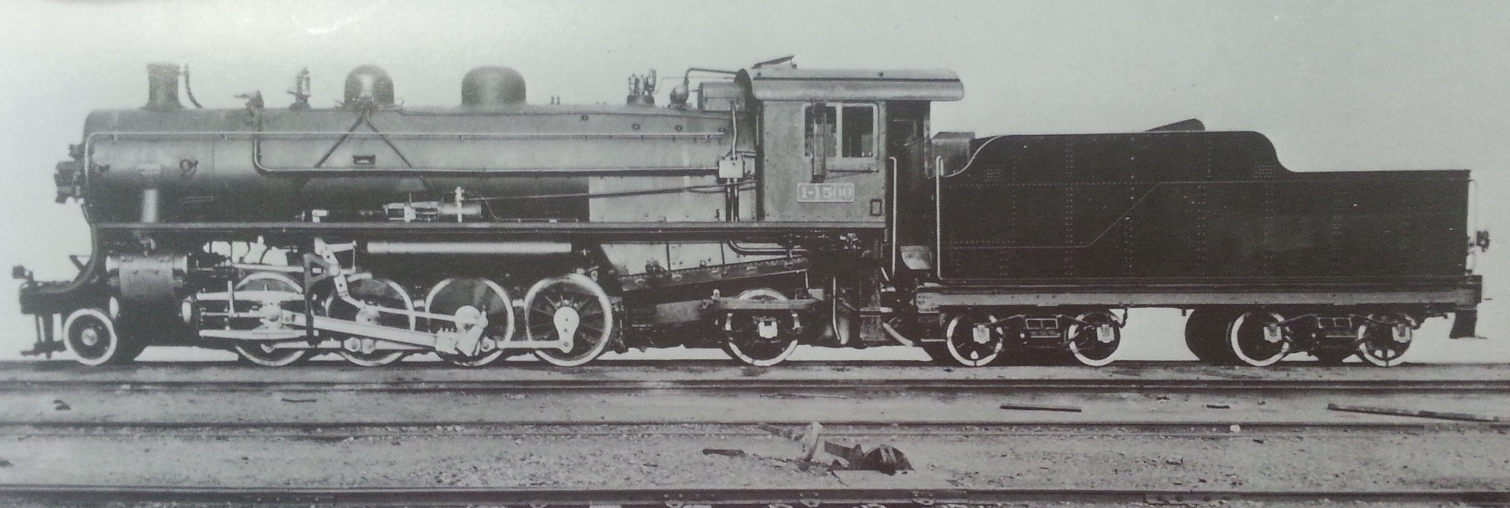
Manchukuo National ミカ1-1500, later ミカナ6700, later ミカイ501, finally China Rys JF1 501

In order to cope with the increase in freight traffic during the First World War, the South Manchuria Railway (Mantetsu) ordered 25 2-8-2 tender locomotives from ALCo of the United States in 1918. Designated M class and numbered 1500 through 1524, they were put to use primarily on coal trains south of Mukden; in 1920 they were reclassified, becoming the Mikai (ミカイ) class, retaining the same numbers.

Satisfied with the type, between 1924 and 1928 Mantetsu took delivery of 45 copies built by Kawasaki, Kisha Seizō, Nippon Sharyō, and Hitachi in Japan, as well as its own Shahekou Works in Dairen. These copies were classified together with the American-made originals, and were numbered 1524 through 1569. They soon became the mainstay for freight power, and after 1931 was also used on the Anfeng Line between Mukden and Andong on the border with Korea. As well as the use on freight trains, they were also used to tow the Kwantung Army's Type 94 Armoured Train.

The Manchukuo National Railway was formed in 1933 and immediately placed an order for 34 of Mantetsu's Mikai class for use on the Duntu Line between Xinjing and Tumen. Known as the "National Big Mika" (國大ミカ) in Manchukuo National service, they were initially designated Duntu Mika (敦圖ミカ) class, with the first batch of eighteen being numbered 1-1500 through 1-1517, and the second batch of sixteen numbered 敦圖ミカ1518 through 敦圖ミカ1533, but they were soon reclassified Mikana (ミカナ) class and numbered 6700 through 6733. A further forty, numbered 6734 through 6773, were added in 1934 and 1935. Though nearly identical to the Mikai class locomotives, the Mikana class were equipped with shorter tenders, as the Manchukuo National used shorter turntables than Mantetsu.

Under the unified classification scheme of 1938, Mantetsu's Mikai class and Manchukuo National's Mikana classes were merged as the Mikai class; under this system, Mantetsu's locomotives became ミカイ1 through ミカイ70, whilst the Manchukuo National units became ミカイ501 through ミカイ574.

	Class & numbers			Postwar		
Owner	1918–1920	1920–1938	1938–1945	CR numbers	Builder	Year
Mantetsu	M 1500−1524	ミカイ1500−ミカイ1569	ミカイ1−ミカイ70	JF1 1−70	1−25: ALCo; 26−70: various	1−25: 1918; 26−70: 1924−28
Manchukuo National "National Big Mika" (國大ミカ)		敦圖ミカ1-1500 − 敦圖ミカ1-1517 ミカ1518−ミカ1533 then: ミカナ6700−6773	ミカイ501−ミカイ574	JF1 501−574	various	1933−1935

=== Mantetsu Mikako (ミカコ) and MNR "New Big Mika" (新國大ミカ) classes ===
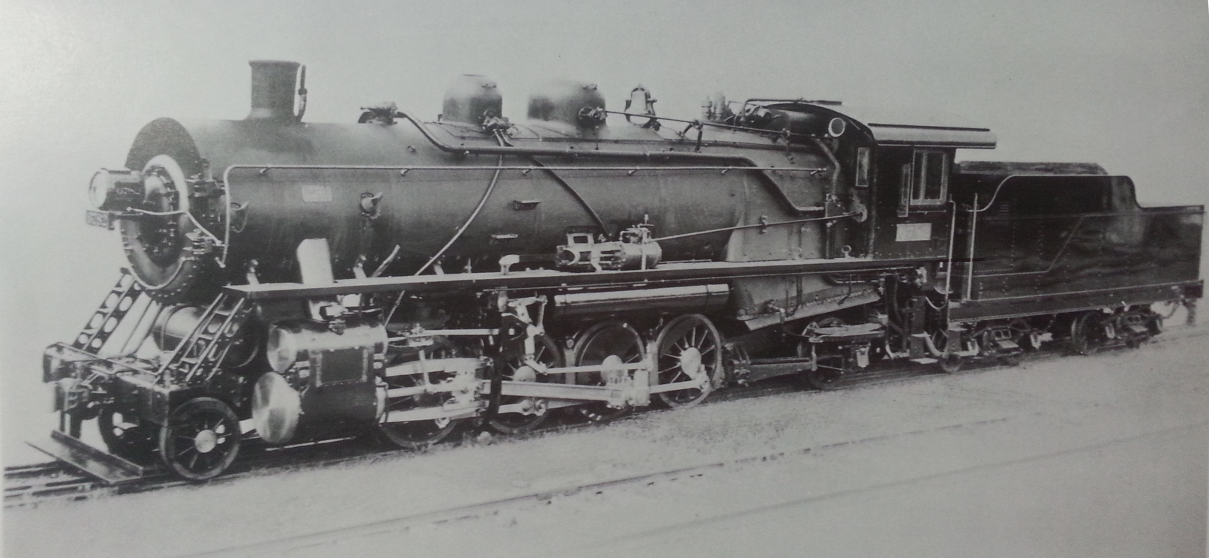
Manchukuo National ミカナ6782, later ミカイ583, finally China Rys JF1 583

After Mantetsu transferred its Dekai-class locomotives to the Manchukuo National Railway, it ordered an improved version of the Mikai class locomotives as a replacement. The new type, called Mikako (ミカコ) class, featured a combustion chamber firebox and a feedwater heater, and eighteen locomotives, built by Kawasaki, Kisha Seizō, Hitachi, the Shahekou Works, and the Dalian Machine Works, were delivered between 1935 and 1937; these were numbered ミカコ1570−ミカイ1587. Like the Mikai class, these used a Type A superheater, but experimentally, ミカコ1577 and ミカコ1587 were fitted with a Schmidt Type E superheater. A further 243 were built between 1938 and 1945.

The Manchukuo National also ordered the new design, where it became the mainstay of the MNR's locomotive fleet - the 709 units delivered accounted for over half of the 1,393 locomotives of all types rostered by the Manchukuo National. Known as the "New National Big Mika" (新國大ミカ) and grouped in the Mikana class, they were initially numbered ミカナ6774−ミカナ6899, ミカナ16700−ミカナ16717, and ミカナ16737−ミカナ16738. Twenty units, ミカナ16718−ミカナ16736 and ミカナ16739, were built for the Manchukuo National but were diverted to the North China Transportation Company prior to delivery. In addition to the 146 built between 1935 and 1937, a further 563 were delivered to the Manchukuo National by the collapse of Manchukuo in 1945.

In the unified classification scheme of 1938, Mantetsu's Mikako class and Manchukuo National's Mikana classes were merged with Mantetsu's Mikai class as the Mikai class; under this system, Mantetsu's Mikako class locomotives became ミカイ71 through ミカイ341, and the MNR's units became ミカイ575 through ミカイ1283.

The North China Transportation Company, a subsidiary of Mantetsu established in 1938 to operate railways and busses in the territory controlled by the Provisional Government of the Republic of China (part of the collaborationist Republic of China from 1940 to 1945), received twenty "New National Big Mika" type locomotives that had been built for the Manchukuo National in 1938. The NCTC was included in the unified classification system of 1938, with their locomotives being distinguished by being numbered starting from 1500. Thus, these diverted locomotives became ミカイ1501 through ミカイ1520. A further 249 were built for NCTC between 1939 and 1945 by Kisha Seizō (84), Kawasaki (24), Hitachi (78), and Nippon Sharyō (63). These were numbered ミカイ1521 through ミカイ1909.

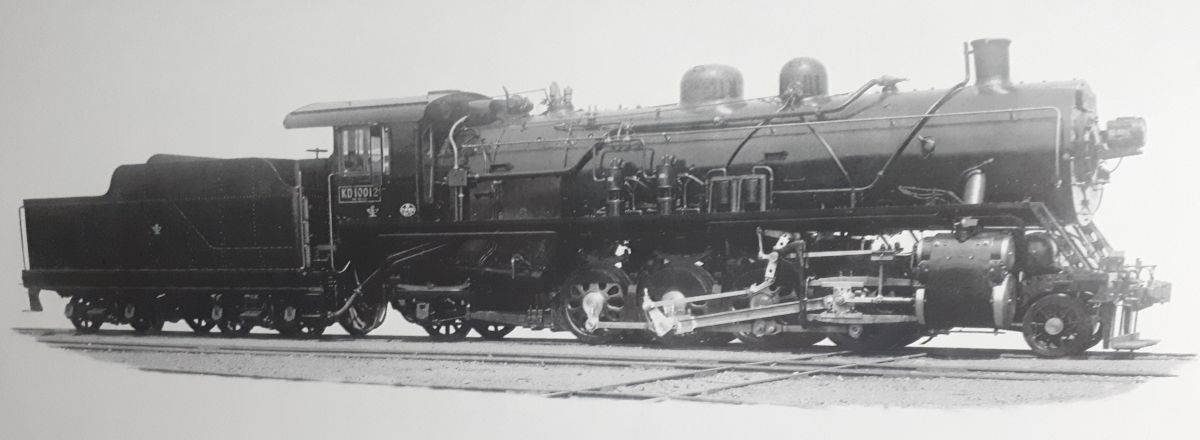
Builder's photo of Central China Railway locomotive KD10012

Following the model of the North China Transportation Company, the Japanese authorities in the territory allocated to the puppet state Reformed Government of the Republic of China (later part of the collaborationist Republic of China from 1940 to 1945) established the Central China Railway to operate the railways in the east-central part of China. Although the Central China Railway used locomotives primarily of Chosen Government Railway and Japanese Government Railway design, in 1940−1941 it did take delivery of nineteen engines of Mantetsu's Mikako design; these were designated the KD100 class, and were numbered KD1001 through KD10019. Five of these, KD1008 through KD10012, were built by Kisha Seizō in 1941 (works numbers 2055 through 2059).

	Class & numbers		Postwar		
Owner	1920–1938	1938–1945	CR numbers	Builder	Year
Mantetsu	ミカコ1570−ミカコ1587	ミカイ71−ミカイ341	JF1 71−341	various	1935−45
Manchukuo National "New National Big Mika" (新國大ミカ)	ミカナ6774−ミカナ6899, ミカナ16700−ミカナ16717, ミカナ16737−ミカナ16738	ミカイ575−ミカイ1283	JF1 575−1283	various	1935−1945
North China Tpt.		ミカイ1501−ミカイ1909	JF1 1501−1909	various	1939−1945
Central China Ry		KD1001−KD1007	within JF1 1910−2023	?	1940−1941
Central China Ry		KD1008−KD10012	within JF1 1910−2023	Kisha Seizō	1940−1941
Central China Ry		KD10013−KD10019	within JF1 1910−2023	?	1940−1941

A total of 1,144 locomotives of the Mantetsu Mikai, Mantetsu Mikako, "National Big Mika" and "New National Big Mika" designs were built for Mantetsu and the Manchukuo National Railway (including those 20 diverted to North China Transport, but not counting those built expressly for NCTC. Of these, almost half - 527 - were built by Mantetsu's own Shahekou Works in Dairen, but the bulk of production, 617 units, was in Japan: 198 from Kisha Seizō, 167 from Kawasaki, 132 from Hitachi, and 95 from Nippon Sharyō. Only the initial 25 from ALCo of the US were built outside the Japanese Empire.

=== North Chosen Colonial Railway ===
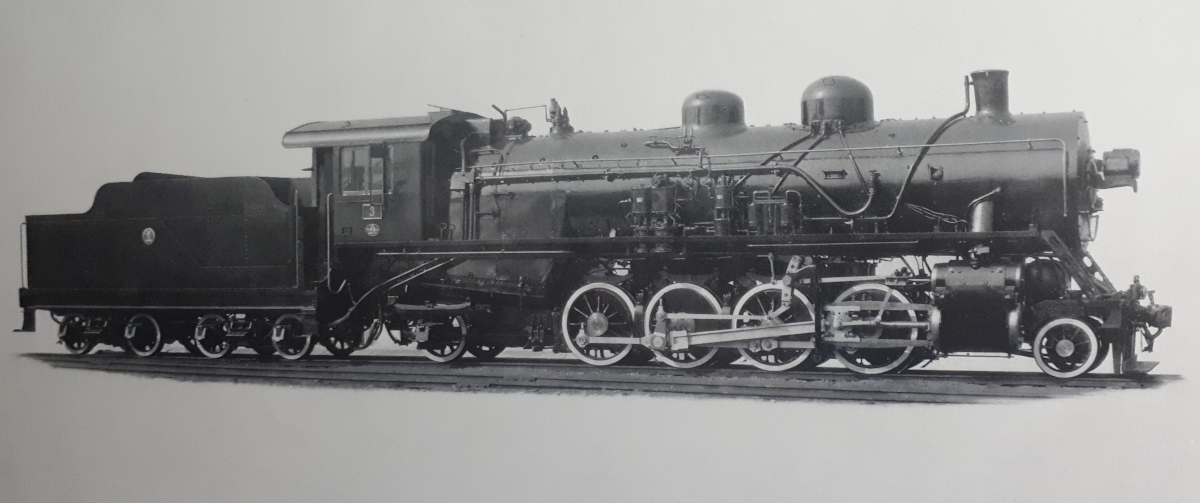
Locomotive number 3 of the North Chosen Colonial Railway

Kisha Seizō built 22 such locomotives for the North Chosen Colonial Railway between 1940 and 1942; these were numbered 1 through 22. After the North Chosen Colonial Railway was nationalised in 1944, these locomotives were taken over by Sentetsu, but their subsequent numbering is unknown.

Road numbers	Year	Builder	Works numbers
1-5	1940	Kisha Seizō	1891-1895
6-11	1940	Kisha Seizō	1987-1992
12-16	1941	Kisha Seizō	2100-2104
17-22	1942	Kisha Seizō	2203-2208

== Postwar ==
=== China Railways 解放1 (JF1) class ===
At the end of the Pacific War, the Mikai class locomotives belonging to Mantetsu and the Manchukuo National were assigned to the Railway Bureaux of Dalian Port (26), Fengtian (319), Jinzhou (154), Jilin (157), and Harbin (188), along with six at Rajin in Korea for use on Mantetsu's North Chosen Line, and 59 that were loaned out to other railways - most (possibly as many as 54) to the Chosen Government Railway. These, along with those belonging to the North China Transportation Company and the Central China Railway together which the total number of the type was over 1400, were taken over by the Republic of China Railways in 1945.

After the establishment of the People's Republic of China, the newly formed China Railway designated the former Mikai class ㄇㄎ壹 (MK1) class in 1951, whilst retaining their previous road numbers. Mantetsu ミカイ1 − ミカイ341 became ㄇㄎ壹1 − ㄇㄎ壹341, MNR ミカイ501 − ミカイ1283 became ㄇㄎ壹501 − ㄇㄎ壹1283, the North China Transport ミカイ1501 − ミカイ1909 became ㄇㄎ壹1501 − ㄇㄎ壹1901, whilst the locomotives from the Central China Railway and other railways became ㄇㄎ壹1902 − ㄇㄎ壹2023.

In 1950, the Sifang Works began assembling new Mikako type locomotives using parts that remained on hand after the war. The first of these, ㄇㄎ壹2101國慶號 (MK1 2101 "National Day"), was completed in September 1950, as the first locomotive to be built in the People's Republic of China. The second, ㄇㄎ壹2102八一號 (MK1 2012 "1 August"), was completed on 26 July 1952, and subsequently another eighteen, numbered 2103 through 2120, were built out of parts on hand.

The first ㄇㄎ壹 to be built new in the PRC using newly made parts was ㄇㄎ壹2121, completed at Sifang in December 1952, after which a further 57 were built, numbered 2122 through 2177.

Under the direction of Jiu Qu (瞿赳), Deputy Chief of the Rolling Stock Industry Authority of the Ministry of Machinery Industry, extensive work to revise the Mikako design was undertaken in 1953. This included converting all dimensions from Imperial measures to metric, improving tolerances, and ensuring that everything met domestic materials standards. The first locomotive built to the refined standards was ㄇㄎ壹2178, completed in December 1954 at the Dalian Works. The new design was slightly longer (22,634 mm (74 ft 3.1 in) vs 21,906 mm (71 ft 10.4 in)) and had a power output rated at 1,945 hp (1,450 kW) compared to the 1,545 hp (1,152 kW) of the previous designs. In 1957 engineers at the Dalian Works further improved the design, leading to the 建設 (JS) (Jiànshè, "Construction") class locomotives.

In 1958, the first locomotive to be built by a locomotive depot in China, as opposed to at a factory, was ㄇㄎ壹4101; this was built in ten days in October of that year, as part of a Great Leap Forward speed challenge. In 1959, China Railways introduced a new classification system, under which all locomotives with 2-8-2 wheel arrangement were named 解放 (Jiefang, "Liberation") class; the ㄇㄎ壹 class thus became the 解放1 (JF1) class.

The JF1 remained in production until 1960, with a total of 455 being built post-war, numbered JF1 2121 through JF1 2500, and in the 4001−4101 range. Most were built at Sifang (216) and Dalian (187), with Qiqihar Works and other factories producing another 32, in addition to the one unit assembled by the crew of Taiyuan depot in 1958. The JF1 class became the mainstay for freight operations, lasting in mainline service until 1996, whilst some in industrial service remained in operation into the 2000s. At least nine have been preserved, including five in Beijing.

China Railways JF1 class locomotives
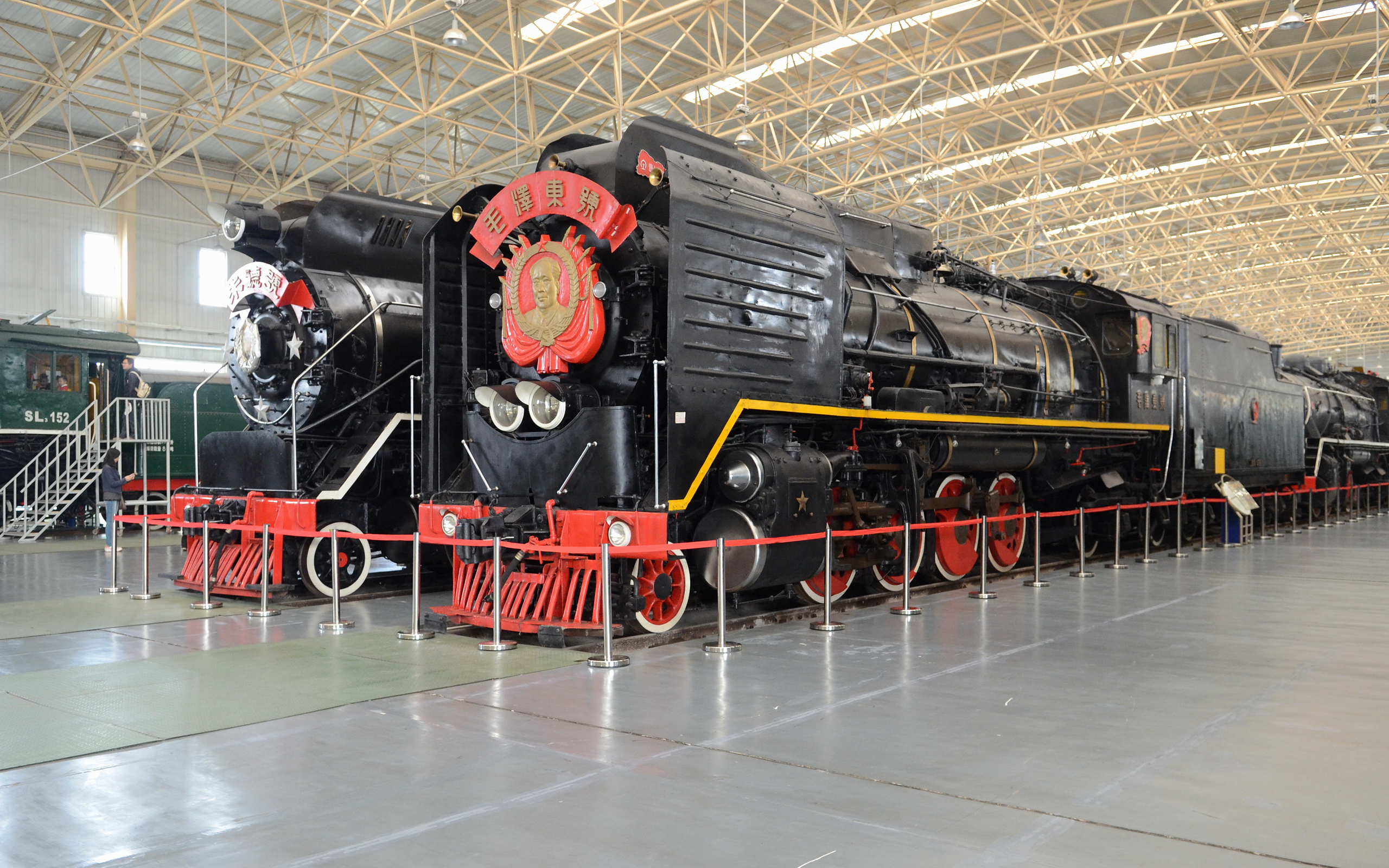
Mikako-type JF1 304 (ex Mantetsu ミカイ304) at the China Railway Museum

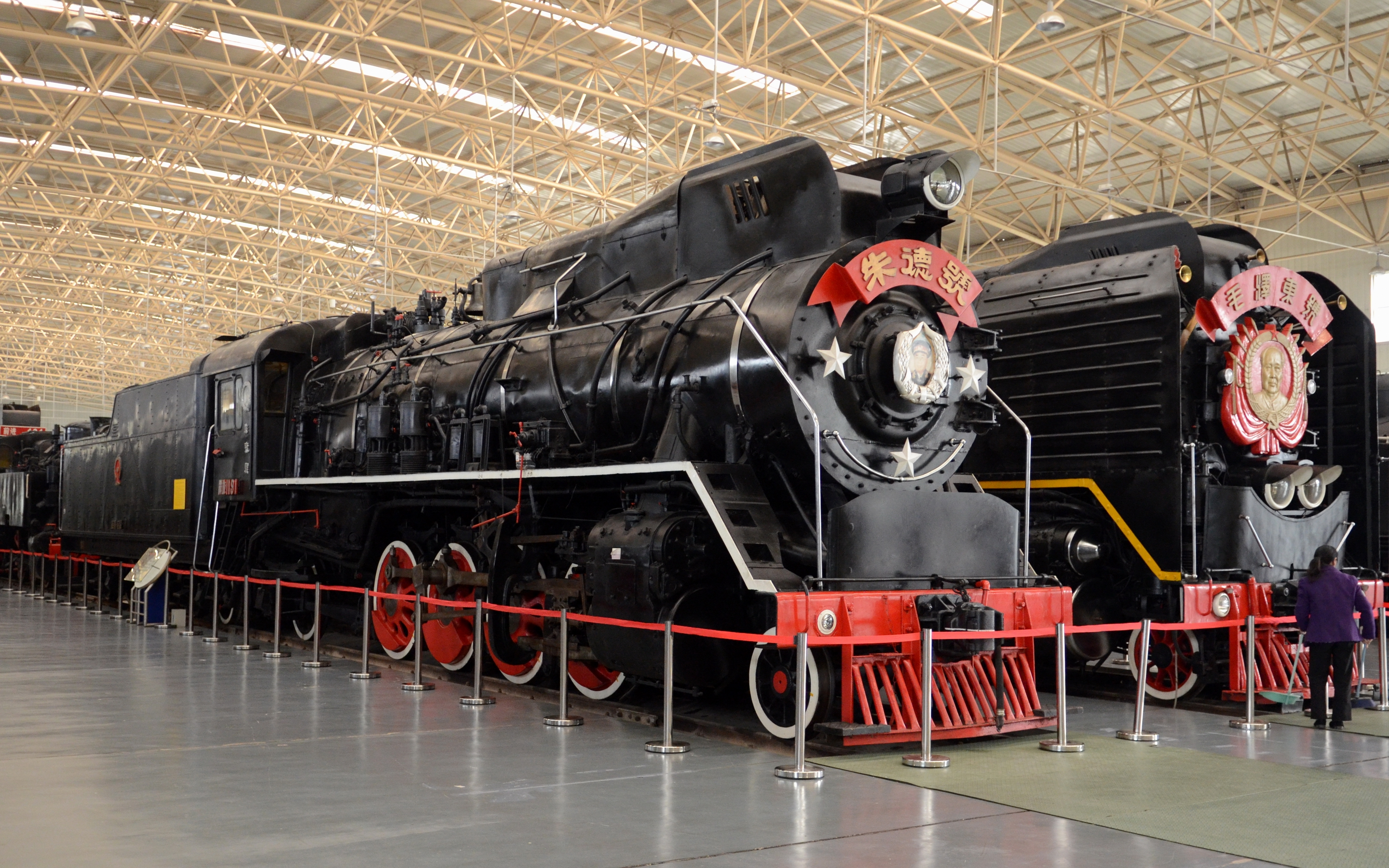
"New National Big Mika" type JF1-1191 (ex Manchukuo National ミカイ1191) at the China Railway Museum

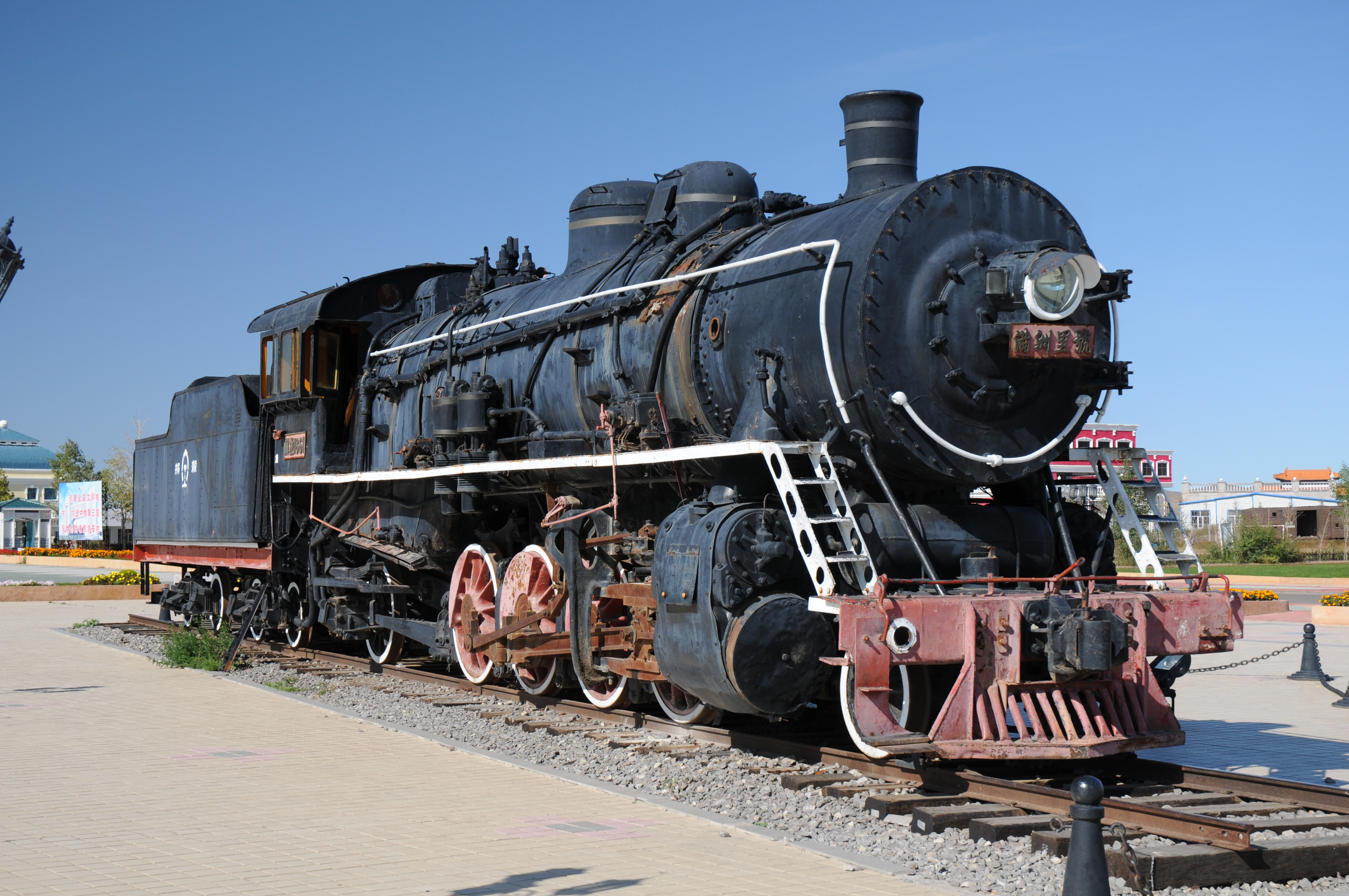
JF1 1861 (ex North China Transport ミカイ1861) at Manzhouli

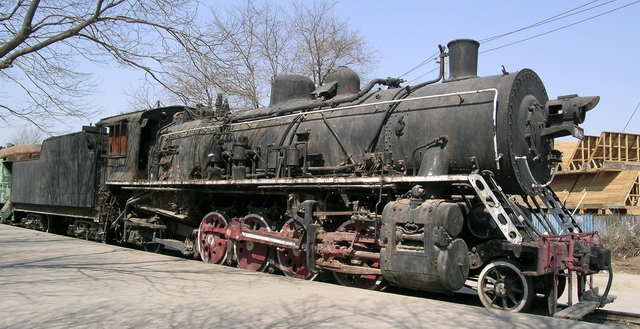
JF1 2023 at Linglong Park, Beijing, one of those Mikako class locomotives built before 1945 for the Central China Railway or an unidentified private railway

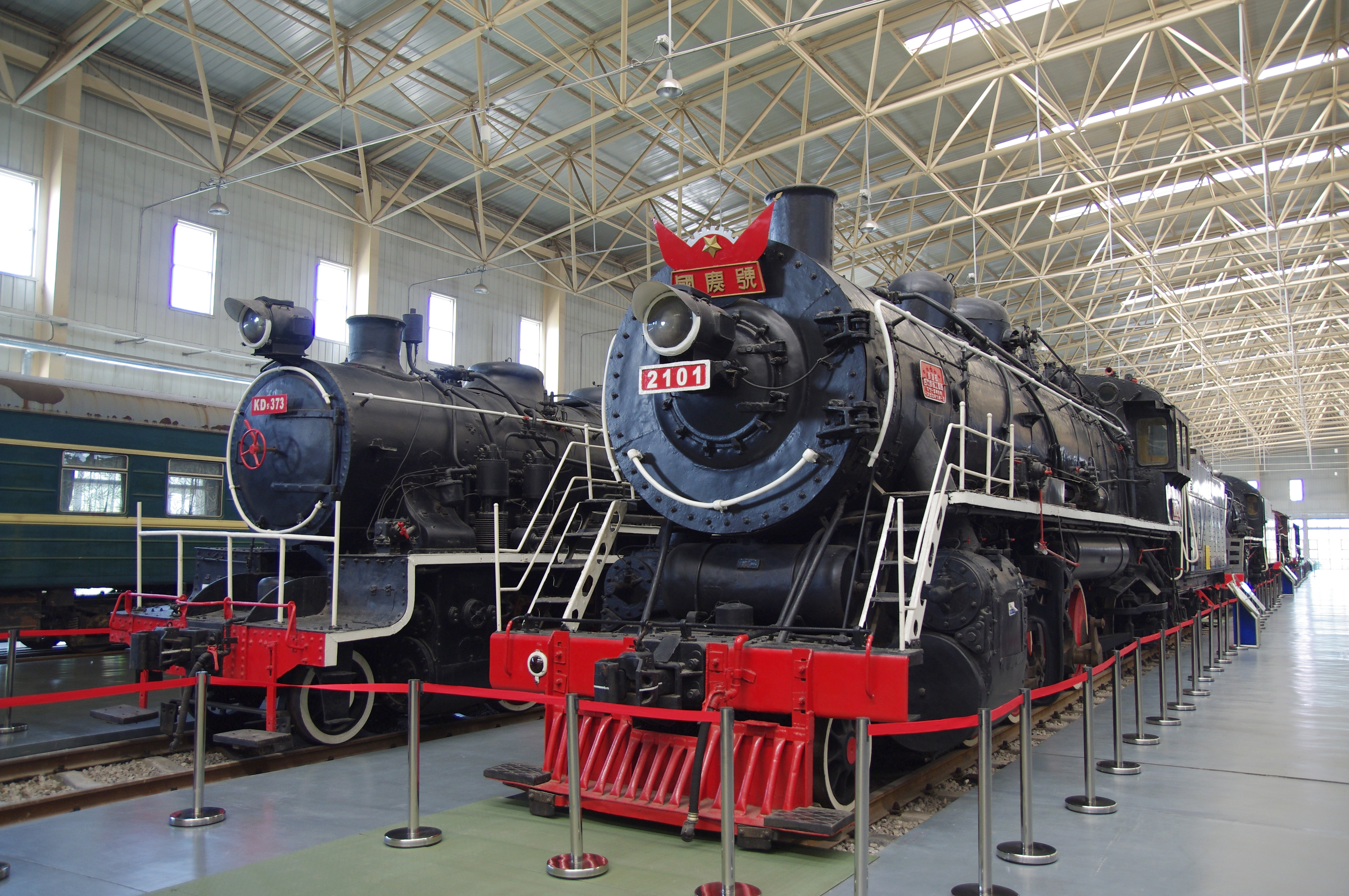
JF1 2101 at the China Railway Museum - the first JF1 built in China after the war

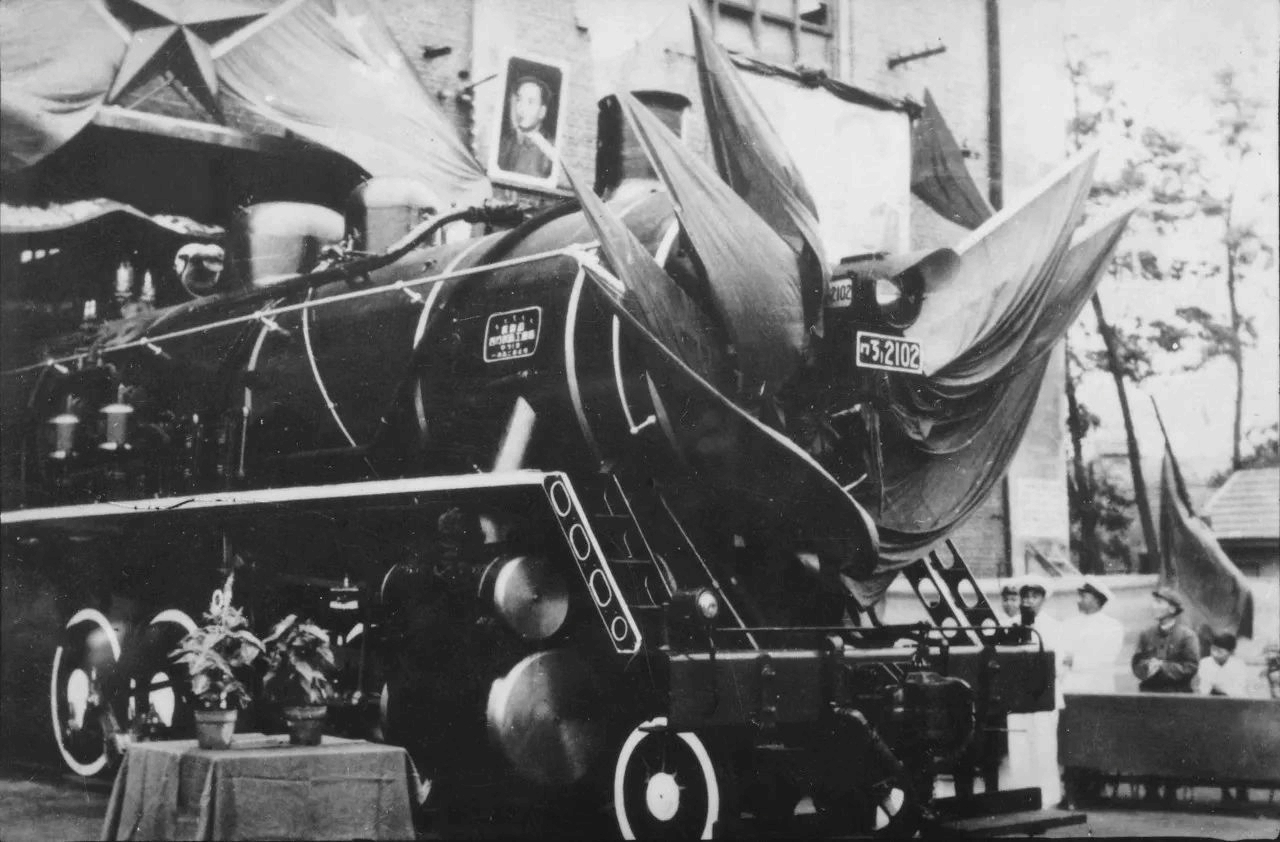
Rollout ceremony of JF1 2102 at Sifang Works

=== Korean State Railway 미가하 (Migaha) class/6000 & 6100 series ===
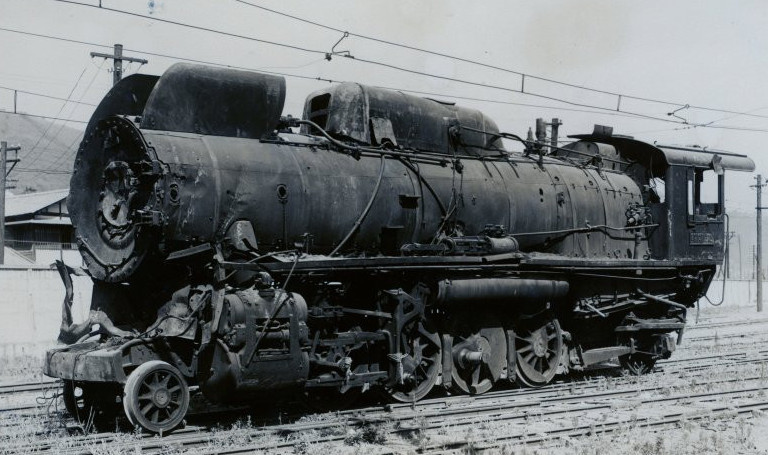
미가하1578 in South Korea in 1951. Originally NCTC ミカイ1578, to (North) Korean State Railway in 1945 as 미가하1578, captured by South Korean forces in 1951 and taken south for repair.

After the end of the Pacific War, up to as many as 54 Mikai class locomotives which had been on loan from Mantetsu to the Chosen Government Railway (Sentetsu) found themselves in Korea; these were divided between North and South when Korea was partitioned, but the exact numbers are unknown. When the war ended, six Mikai-class locomotives had been assigned to Mantetsu's Rajin depot for operations on the North Chosen Line; these remained in North Korea, where they were put into service by the Korean State Railway. Additionally, China supplied more to North Korea as aid during the Korean War - at least seventy of various JF classes, including JF1s. The 22 engines that had originally belonged to the North Chosen Colonial Railway and that had been taken over by Sentetsu probably all ended up with the Korean State Railway.

These locomotives were originally designated 미가하 class (Migaha), and retained their original running number. Later, around the early 1970s, they were renumbered in the 6000 and 6100 series, simply replacing the "미가하" designation with a "6". The following are known to have operated with the Korean State Railway.

		Running number				
KSR number	Original owner	in 1945	Original	Builder	Year	Notes
미가하20 → 6020	Mantetsu	ミカイ20	ミカイ1519 (M 1519)	ALCo	1918	Mantetsu Mikai
미가하21 → 6021	Mantetsu	ミカイ21	ミカイ1520 (M 1520)	ALCo	1918	Mantetsu Mikai
미가하23 → 6023	Mantetsu	ミカイ23	ミカイ1522 (M 1522)	ALCo	1918	Mantetsu Mikai
미가하26 → 6026	Mantetsu	ミカイ26	ミカイ1525	Japan or Shahekou	1924	Mantetsu Mikai
미가하38 → 6038	Mantetsu	ミカイ38	ミカイ1537	Japan or Shahekou	1924~1928	Mantetsu Mikai
미가하53 → 6053	Mantetsu	ミカイ53	ミカイ1552	Japan or Shahekou	1924~1928	Mantetsu Mikai
미가하63 → 6063	Mantetsu	ミカイ63	ミカイ1563	Japan or Shahekou	1924~1928	Mantetsu Mikai; Active in P'yŏngyang in 1992.
미가하83 → 6083	Mantetsu	ミカイ83	ミカコ1582	Japan or Shahekou	1937	Mantetsu Mikako
미가하112 → 6112	Mantetsu	ミカイ112	ミカイ112	Japan or Shahekou	1938~1945	Mantetsu Mikako
미가하121 → 6121	Mantetsu	ミカイ121	ミカイ121	Kawasaki?	1940	Mantetsu Mikako
미가하126 → 6126	Mantetsu	ミカイ126	ミカイ126	Kawasaki?	1940	Mantetsu Mikako
미가하128 → 6128	Mantetsu	ミカイ128	ミカイ128	Kawasaki	1940	Mantetsu Mikako
미가하131 → 6131	Mantetsu	ミカイ131	ミカイ131	Kawasaki	1940	Mantetsu Mikako; Active around Namp'o in 1992.
미가하152 → 6152	Mantetsu	ミカイ152	ミカイ152	Japan or Shahekou	1938~1945	Mantetsu Mikako. Fitted with smoke deflectors.
미가하153 → 6153	Mantetsu	ミカイ153	ミカイ153	Japan or Shahekou	1938~1945	Mantetsu Mikako
미가하154 → 6154	Mantetsu	ミカイ154	ミカイ154	Japan or Shahekou	1938~1945	Mantetsu Mikako
미가하159 → 6159	Mantetsu	ミカイ159	ミカイ159	Japan or Shahekou	1938~1945	Mantetsu Mikako
미가하163 → 6163	Mantetsu	ミカイ163	ミカイ163	Japan or Shahekou	1938~1945	Mantetsu Mikako.
미가하172 → 6172	Mantetsu	ミカイ172	ミカイ172	Japan or Shahekou	1938~1945	Mantetsu Mikako. Fitted with smoke deflectors. Active in the 1990s around Sinŭiju with number plates marked 172 and plaques commemorating an inspection of the locomotive by Kim Il Sung.
미가하584 → ?	Manchukuo National	ミカイ584	ミカナ6783	Japan	1935~1945	"New National Big Mika" (新國大ミカ). Featured in the 1971 film On the Railway (철길우에서)
미가하619 → ?	Manchukuo National	ミカイ619	ミカナ6818	Japan	1935~1945	"New National Big Mika" (新國大ミカ). Featured in the 1971 film On the Railway (철길우에서)
미가하1578	North China Transport	ミカイ1578	ミカイ1578	Japan	1939~1940	"New National Big Mika" (新國大ミカ); Captured by South Korean/UN forces and taken South in 1951.

ミカイ1578 of North China Transport found itself in North Korea after the war, where it became 미가하1578, and then, during the Korean War, was captured by UN forces and taken south for repair.

Note that the 6000 series/미가하 class also included the three Mikai class locomotives inherited from Sentetsu, which were a distinct design from the Mantetsu class of the same name.

Many were still in regular service in the 1990s, with a few remaining in use into the 21st century.

=== Korean National Railroad 미카1 (Mika1) class ===
An unknown number of the up to 54 Mikai class on loan to Sentetsu at the end of the war were in South Korea after the division, where they were put into service by the Korean National Railroad. The KNR classified these 미카1 (Mika1) class, and at least seven of these were taken up by the KNR, retaining their original road numbers:

		Running number				
KNR number	Original owner	in 1945	Original	Builder	Year	Notes
미카1-32	Mantetsu	ミカイ39	ミカイ1538	Japan or Shahekou	1924~1928	Mantetsu Mikai
미카1-125	Mantetsu	ミカイ125	ミカイ125	Kawasaki	1940	Mantetsu Mikako
미카1-539	Manchukuo National	ミカイ539	ミカナ6738	Kisha Seizō (w/n 1258)	1934	"National Big Mika" (國大ミカ)
미카1-618	Manchukuo National	ミカイ618	ミカナ6817	Kisha Seizō (w/n 1329)	1935	"New National Big Mika" (新國大ミカ)
미카1-826	Manchukuo National	ミカイ826	ミカイ826	Japan	?	"New National Big Mika" (新國大ミカ)
미카1-1094	Manchukuo National	ミカイ1094	ミカイ1094	Japan	1942	"New National Big Mika" (新國大ミカ)
미카1-1170	Manchukuo National	ミカイ1170	ミカイ1170	Dalian Machine	?	"New National Big Mika" (新國大ミカ)
미카1-1578	North China Transport	ミカイ1578	ミカイ1578	Japan	1939~1940	"New National Big Mika" (新國大ミカ); In North Korea as KSR 미가하1578 from 1945 to 1951

In addition, twelve more of these were delivered to South Korea from Japan after the war; these were numbered 미카1-1101 through 미카1-1112. 1101 and 1102 are known to have been built by Hitachi in 1947, whilst 1104 through 1109 were built by Kawasaki in 1950.

=== Korean National Railroad 미카5 (Mika5) class ===
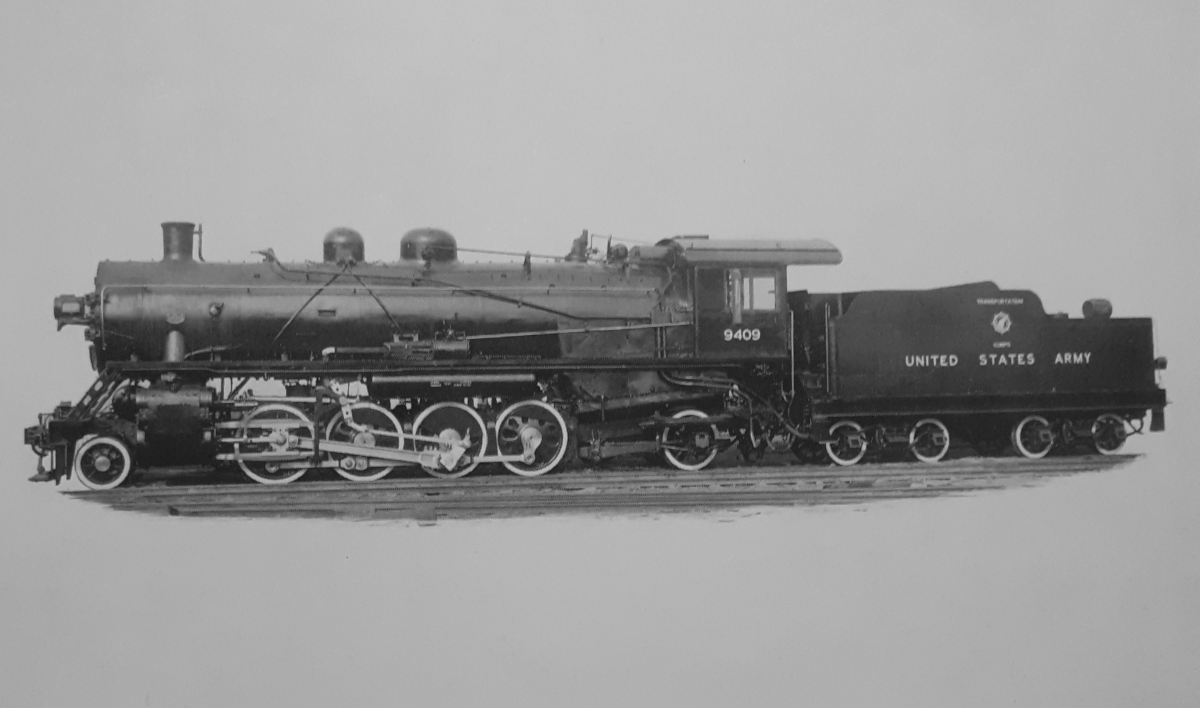
Mikai-class locomotive no 9409 built by Kisha Seizō for the US Army Transportation Corps (w/n 2604), later KNR 미카5-26)

After the partition of Korea, the US military administration in Korea ordered the construction of new Mikako type locomotives in Japan for use in South Korea; 49 were delivered, of which 33, numbered in the 9400 series, were taken up by the US Army Transportation Corps. The original assignments of the other eleven locomotives is unclear.

US Military designation	Build date	Builder	Works numbers	Number of units
(Unknown)	April−July 1947	Kawasaki	3150−3154	5
1995−1997	February 1948	Hitachi	1883−1885	3
1998−1999	March 1948	Hitachi	1911−1912	2
N.1−N.5	July 1950	Nippon Sharyō	1543−1547	5
N.6	November 1950	Nippon Sharyō	1548	1
9400−9403 (USATC)	November 1950	Nippon Sharyō	1549−1552	4
9404−9408 (USATC)	November 1950	Kawasaki	3209−3113	5
9409−9411 (USATC)	Nov−Dec 1950	Kisha Seizō	2604−2606	3
9412−9415 (USATC)	November 1950	Hitachi	1937−1938, 1941−1942	4
9416−9418 (USATC)	November 1950	Mitsubishi	709−711	3
9419−9428 (USATC)	July 1951	Nippon Sharyō	1553−1562	10
9429−9432 (USATC)	July 1951	Kawasaki	3214−3217	4

After the end of the Korean War, these were passed on to the KNR. In addition, UN forces captured a number of Mikako-type locomotives that had been provided to North Korea from China during the war; these, along with a few Mikako type locomotives that remained in the South after the partition, were grouped together with the 49 built in Japan between 1947 and 1951, and the KNR grouped these 56 locomotives into 미카5 class and numbered them 미카5-1 through 미카5-56.

A further twenty were built in Japan in 1952 (ten by Nippon Sharyō, five each by Hitachi and Kisha Seizō), but these were never delivered to South Korea. Due to the different standards in Japan and Korea (track gauge, axle load, clearance profiles), these were not taken up by the Japanese National Railways, and instead sat unused for many years until finally being scrapped, brand-new, in 1965.

== Preservation ==
Thirteen of the JF1 class have been preserved.

=== China ===
At the China Railway Museum in Beijing:

- JF1 304 - named "Mao Zedong"; previously Mantetsu ミカイ304.
- JF1 1191 - "Zhu De"; "New National Big Mika" type previously Manchukuo National ミカイ1191.
- JF1 2101 - "National Day"; first steam locomotive built in China after the establishment of the PRC.
- JF1 2121
- JF1-4101 - built by Taiyuan Locomotive Depot in 1958, the first locomotive to be built at a locomotive depot in China.

At Qingdao Sifang Locomotive Works:

- JF1 2102 - named "1 August"; second steam locomotive built in China after the establishment of the PRC.

At Manzhouli Railway Station, Manzhouli:

- JF1 1861 - previously North China Transport ミカイ1861.

At the Memorial of the War to Resist US Aggression and Aid Korea:

- ㄇㄎ1-1115 - This locomotive was assigned to the Siping Locomotive Depot of the Changchun Railway Bureau, and during the Korean War it was used to transport materiel to North Korea. Under the direction of Engineer Li Guoheng (李国珩), this locomotive broke through enemy blockades four times in order to complete its deliveries, working for ten months on the P'yŏngbu Line between Sariwŏn and Sinmak. Li Guoheng was awarded the Meritorious Service Medal, 1st Class and the Heroic Exemplar Medal, 2nd Class, as well as the North Korean Soldier's Medal of Honour, 2nd Class.

At Linglong Park, Beijing:

- JF1 2023

=== South Korea ===
- Mika5-31, at Yeongsanpo Station on the Honam Line
- Mika5-37, at the headquarters of Hyundai Rotem
- Mika5-48, at the Daegu Children's Centre
- Mika5-56, at the Seoul Hwarangdae station (Gyeongchun Line)
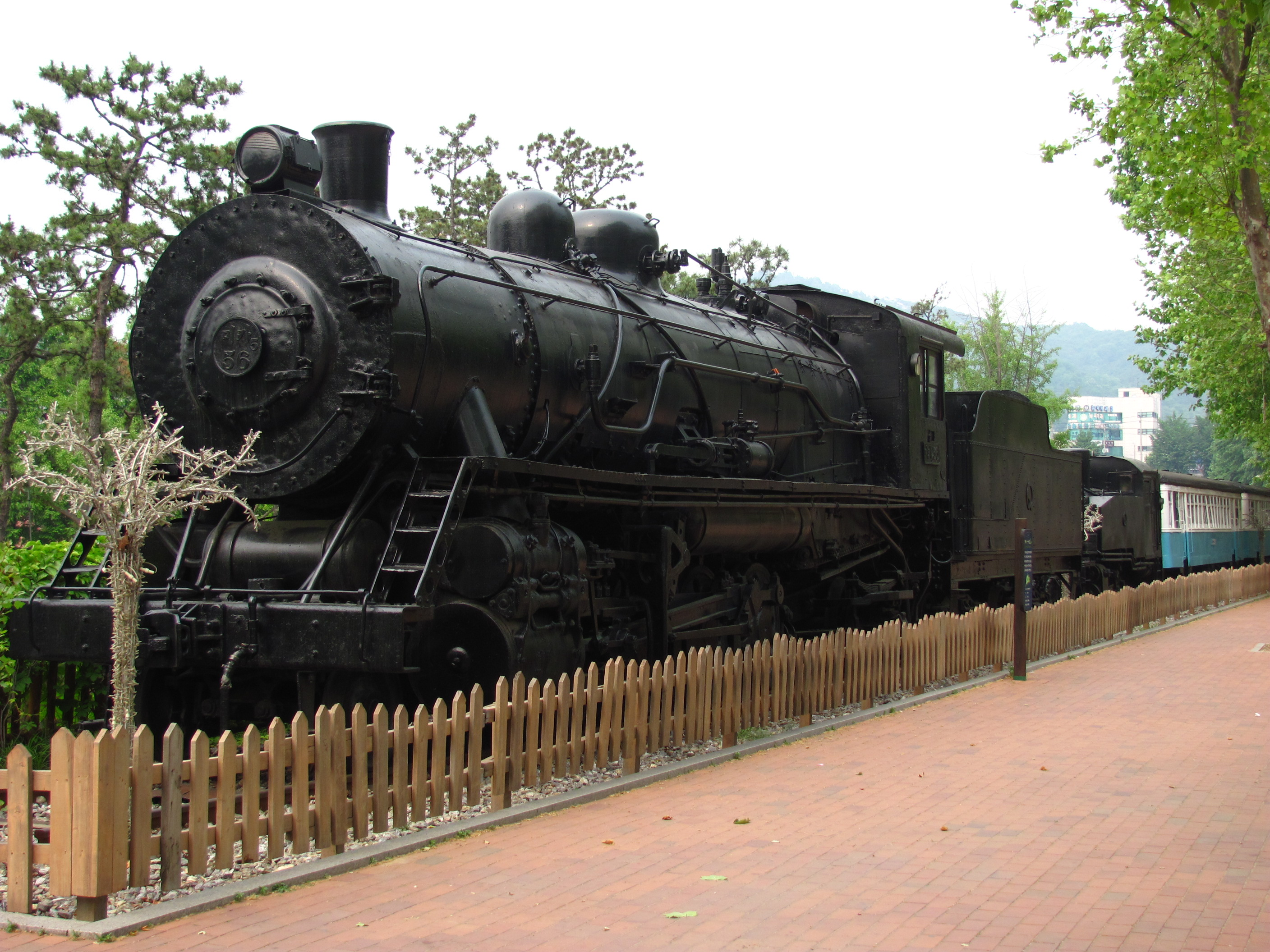
Mika5-56

=== North Korea ===
- At least one (6163) is still operational, though likely used only for railfan tours as opposed to regular service.
