= Koto station =

Railway station in North Korea

Kot'o 고토

Korean name
- Hangul: 고토역
- Hanja: 古土驛
- Revised Romanization: Goto-yeok
- McCune–Reischauer: Kot'o-yŏk

General information
- Location: Hwangch'o-rodongjagu, Changjin-gun, South Hamgyŏng; North Korea
- Owner: Korean State Railway
- Platforms: 2 (1 island)
- Tracks: 4

History
- Opened: 1 November 1934
- Original company: Sinhŭng Railway

Services
Preceding station	Korean State Railway	Following station
Sangp'yŏng towards Sasu	Changjin Line	Hwangch'oryŏng towards Yŏnggwang
Location

Kot'o station is a railway station in Hwangch'o-rodongjagu, Changjin County, South Hamgyŏng province, North Korea on the Changjin Line of the Korean State Railway. There is a spur from the station to a factory.

== History ==
The station was opened on 1 November 1934 by the Sinhŭng Railway as part of the second section of its Changjin Line between Samgŏ and Kujin. The Sinhŭng Railway was bought and absorbed by the Chosen Railway on 22 April 1938.
