= Namheung Line =

Railway line in colonial Korea

Overview
- Native name: 남흥선 (南興線)
- Status: Operational (see text)
- Owner: Sinheung Railway (1934–1938); Chōsen Railway (1938–1945)
- Locale: South Hamgyeong
- Termini: West Hamhung; Seohojin
- Stations: 10

Service
- Type: Heavy rail, Regional rail Passenger/Freight
- Operator(s): Sinheung Railway; Chōsen Railway
- Depot(s): Singuryong

History
- Opened: 1934–1936

Technical
- Line length: 18.5 km (11.5 mi)
- Number of tracks: Single track
- Track gauge: 762 mm (2 ft 6 in)

The Namheung Line (南興線, Nankō-sen) was a 762 mm (30.0 in) narrow gauge railway line of the Chōsen Railway (Chōtetsu) of colonial-era Korea, located in South Hamgyeong Province, serving an industrial area south of the city of Hamheung.

== History ==
The Chōsen Forestry Railway extended its Hamnam Line from Oro to Jangpung on 25 August 1923, and at the same time opened West Hamheung Station between Hamheung and Heungsang, 1.1 km (0.68 mi) from Hamheung.; later that year, it merged with five other companies to form the Chōsen Railway. Eleven years later, this new station would become the starting point for a new line to serve factories being opened to the south of the city. The first section, running 14.9 km (9.3 mi) from West Hamheung to Cheongiri, was opened on 11 May 1934. Two years later the line was extended, first with a 1.7 km (1.1 mi) section from Cheongiri to Naeho on 5 March, followed by another 1.7 km (1.1 mi) section from Naeho to Seohojin on the Chōsen Government Railway's Hamgyeong Line opened on 15 December. The Sinheung Railway was absorbed by Chōtetsu on 22 April 1938, which continued to operate the line until the end of the Pacific War.

After the establishment of North Korea and the nationalisation of its railways, the Namheung Line was renamed Sŏho Line by the Korean State Railway, which subsequently rebuilt the section between Unjung and Seohojin on a new, shorter alignment.

== Services ==
In the November 1942 timetable, the last issued prior to the start of the Pacific War, Chōtetsu operated the following schedule of commuter services:

Dist. ↓	Price K. yen	3	5	7	9		47	49	51	53	Station name	Dist. ↑	Price K. yen	2	4	8	10		50	52	54	58
0.0	-	...	...	06:20	07:00	every 20 min.	20:05	21:00	22:00	23:00	West Hamheung	18.5	0.50	05:51	06:31	07:11	07:51	every 20 min.	21:11	...	22:39	...
11.8	0.35	05:40	06:20	06:55	07:35	every 20 min.	20:37	21:35	22:35	23:31	Singuryong	6.7	0.25	05:20	06:00	06:40	07:20	every 20 min.	20:40	21:09	22:05	23:55
18.5	0.50	06:05	06:45	07:21	08:00	every 20 min.	21:02	22:00	23:01	...	Seohojin	0.0	-	...	...	...	06:50	every 20 min.	20:10	20:43	21:32	23:30

== Route ==
南興線 - 남흥선 - Nankō Line - Namheung Line
Distance		Station name				
Total; km	S2S; km	Transcribed, Korean	Transcribed, Japanese	Hunminjeongeum	Hanja/Kanji	Connections
0.0	0.0	Seohamheung; West Hamheung	Nishi-Kankō	서함흥	西咸興	Hamnam Line
1.2	1.2	Sapo	Shaho	사포	沙浦	
3.5	2.3	Sangsu	Jōsui	상수	上水	
5.9	2.4	Seongcheongang	Jōsenkō	성천강	城川江	
7.6	1.7	Heungdeok	Kōtoku	흥덕	興徳	
10.0	2.4	Unjung	Unchū	운중	雲中	
11.8	1.8	Singuryong	Shinkyūryū	신구룡	新九龍	
14.9	1.6	Cheongiri	Tenkiri	천기리	天機里	
16.6	1.7	Naeho	Naiko	내호	内湖	
18.5	1.7	Seohojin	Seikoshin	서호진	西湖津	Sentetsu Hamgyeong Line
