= Pumin station =

Railway station in North Korea

Pumin 부민

Korean name
- Hangul: 부민역
- Hanja: 富民驛
- Revised Romanization: Bumin-yeok
- McCune–Reischauer: Pumin-yŏk

General information
- Location: Pumil-li, Tonghŭngsan-guyŏk, Hamhŭng-si, South Hamgyŏng; North Korea
- Owner: Korean State Railway
- Platforms: 1
- Tracks: 2

History
- Opened: 10 June 1923
- Original company: Sinhŭng Railway

Services
Preceding station	Korean State Railway	Following station
Yŏnggwang towards Sinhŭng	Sinhŭng Line (1435 mm)	Kadam towards Hamhŭng
Location

Pumin station is a railway halt in Pumil-li, Tonghŭngsan-guyŏk, Hamhŭng city, South Hamgyŏng province, North Korea, on the Sinhŭng Line of the Korean State Railway.

== History ==
The station was opened on 10 June 1923 by the Sinhŭng Railway as part of the 17.0 km (10.6 mi) first section of its Hamnam Line between Hamhŭng and Oro. The Sinhŭng Railway was bought and absorbed by the Chosen Railway on 22 April 1938.
