= Jangjin Line =

Railway line in colonial Korea

Overview
- Native name: 장진선 (長津線)
- Status: Operational (see text)
- Owner: Sinheung Railway (1934–1938); Chōsen Railway (1938–1945)
- Locale: South Hamgyeong
- Termini: Sangtong; Sasu (after 1935) Gujin (until 1935)
- Stations: 11 (14)

Service
- Type: Heavy rail, Regional rail Passenger/Freight
- Operator(s): Sinheung Railway; Chōsen Railway

History
- Opened: 1934

Technical
- Line length: 59.5 km (37.0 mi)
- Number of tracks: Single track
- Track gauge: 762 mm (2 ft 6 in)

The Jangjin Line (長津線, Chōshin-sen) was a 762 mm (2 ft 6.0 in) narrow gauge railway line of the Chōsen Railway of colonial-era Korea, located in South Hamgyeong Province. There is a 7.4 km (4.6 mi) cable-hauled section between Samgo and Hwangch'oryong; between Pojang and Hwangch'oryong the grade reaches 370‰.

== History ==
In 1934, to aid in the construction of a new hydroelectric power plant on the Jangjin River, and to exploit forestry and other resources in the area, the Sinheung Railway, a subsidiary of the Chōsen Railway began construction of a new line from Sangtong, terminus of its Hamnam Line. The first section, from Sangtong to Samgeo, was opened on 1 September 1934, followed by an extension from Samgeo to Gujin on 1 November of the same year.

Later, the Sindae—Gujin section was closed on 15 July 1935, followed by the closure of the Sasu—Sindae section on 30 August 1935.

The Sinheung Railway was absorbed by Chōtetsu on 22 April 1938, which divided the Hamnam Line, naming the Sangtong–Sasu line Jangjin Line.

After the partition of Korea, the line was located in the territory of North Korea, and was nationalised to become part of the Korean State Railway. The Jangjin Line was subsequently merged with part of the Hamnam Line to create the present-day Changjin Line.

== Services ==
In the November 1942 timetable, the last issued prior to the start of the Pacific War, Chōtetsu operated the following schedule of third-class-only local passenger services:

Distance (read down)	Price Korean yen	301	303	305	307	311	383	Station name	Distance (read up)	Price Korean yen	300	302	304	306	308	310
-	-	from Oro	from Hamheung	from Hamheung	from Hamheung	from Hamheung	...		75.6	3.50	to Hamheung	to Hamheung	to Hamheung	to Hamheung	to Hamheung	...
30.3	1.25	08:05	09:35	12:26	15:17	18:56	...	Sangtong	45.0	1.85	07:10	09:36	12:31	15:21	18:52	...
45.4	1.85	09:21	10:54	13:45	16:34	20:12	...	Samgeo	29.9	1.25	06:05	08:30	11:26	14:18	17:50	...
58.2	2.80	...	12:45	15:50	17:50	...	08:32	Goto	17.1	0.70	...	...	09:50	12:40	16:03	18:31
75.6	3.50	...	13:46	16:51	19:46	...	09:36	Sasu	0.0	-	...	...	08:20	11:10	14:35	18:28

== Route ==
長津線 - 장진선 - Chōshin Line - Jangjin Line
Distance		Station name				
Total; km	S2S; km	Transcribed, Korean	Transcribed, Japanese	Hunminjeongeum	Hanja/Kanji	Connections
0.0	0.0	Sangtong	Jōtsū	상통	上通	Hamnam Line
4.1	4.1	Yongsu	Ryūsui	용수	龍水	
10.1	6.0	Hagicheon	Kagisen	하기천	下岐川	
15.1	5.0	Samgeo	Sankyo	삼거	三巨	
18.7	3.6	Bojang	Hōshō	부장	堡庄	
22.5	3.8	Hwangchoryeong	Kōsōrei	황초령	黄草嶺	
27.9	5.4	Goto	Kodo	고토	古土	
33.1	5.2	Buseong	Fusei	부성	富盛	
35.9	2.8	Sangpyeong	Jōhei	상평	上坪	
41.0	5.1	Jangjin	Chōshin	장진	長津	
45.0	4.0	Sasu	Shisui	사수	泗水	
49.1	4.1	Sindae	Shintai	신대	新垈	Closed 30 August 1935
54.3	5.2	Chungnam	Chūnan	중남	中南	Closed 15 July 1935
59.5	5.2	Gujin	Kyūshin	구진	旧津	Closed 15 July 1935
