= Hamnam Line (Chōtetsu) =

Railway line in colonial Korea

Overview
- Native name: 함남선 (咸南線)
- Status: Operational (see text)
- Owner: Chōsen Forestry Railway (1923); Chōsen Railway (1923–1930); Sinheung Railway (1930–1938); Chōsen Railway (1938–1945)
- Locale: South Hamgyeong
- Termini: Hamheung; Hamnam Sinheung, Jangpung
- Stations: 28

Service
- Type: Heavy rail, Regional rail Passenger/Freight

History
- Opened: 1923–1926

Technical
- Line length: 56.6 km (35.2 mi)
- Number of tracks: Single track
- Track gauge: 762 mm (2 ft 6 in)

Hamnam Line (咸南線, Kan'nan-sen) was the name given by the Chōsen Railway (Chōtetsu) of colonial-era Korea to a small network of 762 mm (30.0 in) narrow gauge railway lines in South Hamgyeong Province.

== History ==
A line from Hamheung on the Hamgyeong Line of the Chōsen Government Railway to Oro, to exploit forestry and other resources in the area, was originally planned by the Chosen Forestry Railway as part of a trunk line connecting Hamhung to Manpo via Changjin and Huju. The first section, 17.0 km (10.6 mi) from Hamheung to Oro, was opened on 7 June 1923, and on 25 August 1923, the 11.2 km (7.0 mi) Oro–Jangpung section and West Hamheung Station were opened.

On 1 September 1923, the Chōsen Forestry Railway merged with five other private railway companies to form the Chōsen Railway (Chōtetsu); Chōtetsu subsequently named the Hamheung–Jangpung line Hamnam Line.

On 1 October 1926, Chōtetsu opened a 15.1 km (9.4 mi) section of line from Oro to Sangtong; this was followed on 1 February 1928 by the 20.0 km (12.4 mi) section from Pungsang to Hamnam Songheung. Two years later, on 1 February 1930 the Hamnam Line was taken over by a newly established subsidiary company, the Sinheung Railway.

The Sinheung Railway continued to expand the network, and on 15 January 1932, after the existing Hamnam Songheung Station was renamed Hasonghung Station, the present Hamnam Songheung Station was opened 1.0 km (0.62 mi) from Hasongheung, and on 10 September 1933, the line was extended 31.6 km (19.6 mi) to Bujeonhoban.

The Sinheung Railway was absorbed by Chōtetsu on 22 April 1938, and Chōtetsu separated the Hamnam Sinheung–Bujeonhoban section from the Hamnam Line, naming that portion the Songheung Line.

After the establishment of North Korea and the nationalisation of its railways, the Hamnam Line was split up, with the Hamheung - Oro - Sinheung section becoming the Sinhŭng Line, and the Oro - Sangtong section becoming part of the Changjin Line. At the same time, the Songheung Line was merged into the Sinhŭng Line.

== Services ==
In the November 1942 timetable, the last issued prior to the start of the Pacific War, Chōtetsu operated the following schedule of third-class-only local passenger services:

Hamheung ~ Oro
Distance (read down)	Price K. yen	303/ 503	305	505	307	507	311	313	315	317	Station name	Distance (read up)	Price K. yen	400	402	300	302	502	304	306/ 504	308	506
0.0	-	07:10	09:30	10:30	12:00	15:00	16:10	19:10	22:24	23:15	Hamheung	17.0	0.70	05:39	07:54	09:09	11:39	13:44	14:34	17:49	20:59	22:23
2.5	0.15	07:24	09:55	10:55	12:29	15:26	16:30	19:37	22:45	23:35	West Hamheung	14.5	0.55	05:30	07:45	09:00	11:30	13:35	14:25	17:40	20:50	22:14
6.6	0.30	07:35	10:07	11:07	12:41	15:38	16:41	19:49	22:57	23:47	Heungsang	10.4	0.40	05:09	07:12	08:34	11:11	12:58	14:04	17:17	20:24	21:53
9.3	0.40	07:44	10:16	11:16	12:50	15:47	16:50	19:58	23:06	23:50	Bumin	7.7	0.35	05:01	07:04	08:26	11:02	12:49	13:55	17:08	20:15	21:45
12.3	0.55	07:52	10:25	11:25	12:59	15:56	16:59	20:07	23:15	00:05	Jangheung	4.7	0.25	04:52	06:55	08:17	10:53	12:40	13:46	17:00	20:06	21:36
17.0	0.70	08:04	10:37	11:37	13:11	16:08	17:11	20:19	23:27	00:17	Oro	0.0	-	04:40	06:43	08:05	10:40	12:27	13:33	16:47	19:53	21:24
Cont. to:		303: Sasu; 503: B-hoban	Sasu	B-hoban	Sasu	H. Songheung	Samgeo	-	-	-		Arr from:		-	-	Samgeo	Samgeo	H. Songheung	Sasu	306: Sasu; 504: B-hoban	Sasu	B-hoban

Oro ~ Jangpung/Hamnam Sinheung
Distance (read down)	Price K. yen	501	503	505	507	Station name	Distance (read up)	Price K. yen	500	502	504	506
Arr. from		-	Hamheung	Hamheung	Hamheung		Cont. to:		-	Hamheung	Hamheung	Hamheung
17.0	0.70	05:05	08:10	12:12	17:15	Oro	74.6	3.60	08:59	12:03	16:28	21:06
25.9	1.05	05:39	08:34	12:36	17:38	arr. Pungsang dep.	65.7	3.20	08:36	11:40	16:05	20:44
0.0	-	↓	09:50	↓	↓	dep. Pungsang arr.	2.3	0.15	↑	10:30	↑	↑
2.3	0.15	↓	10:00	↓	↓	Jangpung	0.0	-	↑	10:20	↑	↑
25.9	1.05	05:40	08:39	12:46	17:40	dep. Pungsang arr.	65.7	3.20	08:34	11:35	16:03	20:42
33.5	1.40	06:09	09:08	13:15	18:10	Cheonbulsan	58.5	2.80	08:12	11:16	15:41	20:21
41.0	1.65	06:56	09:55	14:14	19:09	Hamnam Sinheung	50.6	2.10	07:45	10:50	15:15	19:55
Cont. to:		H. Songheung	B-hoban	B-hoban	H. Songheung	Songheung Line	Arr. from:		H. Songheung	H. Songheung	B-hoban	B-hoban

Oro ~ Sangtong
Distance (read down)	Price K. yen	301	303	305	307	311	Station name	Distance (read up)	Price K. yen	300	302	304	306	308
Arr. from:		-	Hamheung	Hamheung	Hamheung	Hamheung		Cont. to:		Hamheung	Hamheung	Hamheung	Hamheung	Hamheung
17.0	0.70	06:51	08:25	11:12	13:48	17:40	Oro	58.6	2.80	07:51	10:17	13:12	16:03	19:33
22.1	0.95	07:09	08:42	11:30	14:06	17:58	Tongyang	53.5	2.20	07:37	10:03	12:58	15:49	19:19
26.1	1.10	07:24	08:57	11:45	14:21	18:13	Songdang	49.5	2.00	07:24	09:50	12:45	15:36	19:06
30.3	1.25	08:05	09:35	12:26	15:17	18:56	Sangtong	43.3	1.80	07:10	09:36	12:31	15:21	18:52
Cont. to:		Samgeo	Sasu	Sasu	Sasu	Samgeo	Jangjin Line	Arr. from:		Samgeo	Samgeo	Sasu	Sasu	Sasu

== Route ==
咸南線 - 함남선 - Kan'nan Line - Hamnam Line
Distance		Station name				
Total; km	S2S; km	Transcribed, Korean	Transcribed, Japanese	Hunminjeongeum	Hanja/Kanji	Connections
0.0	0.0	Hamheung	Kankō	함흥	咸興	Sentetsu Hamgyeong Line
1.0	1.0	Seohamheung; West Hamheung	Nishi-Kankō	서함흥	西咸興	Namheung Line
6.6	5.6	Heungsang	Kōshō	흥상	興祥	
9.3	2.7	Bumin	Fumin	부민	富民	
12.3	3.0	Jangheung	Chōkō	장흥	長興	
17.0	4.7	Oro	Gorō	오로	五老	Sangtong branch
25.9	8.9	Pungsang	Hōjō	풍상	豊上	Jangpung branch
30.7	4.8	Jeondong	Tentō	전동	典洞	
33.5	2.8	Cheonbulsan	Senbutsuzan	천불산	千仏山	
41.0	7.5	Hamnam Sinheung	Kan'nan-Shinkō	함남신흥	咸南新興	Songheung Line

上通支線 - 상통지선 - Jōtsū Branch - Sangtong Branch
Distance		Station name				
Total; km	S2S; km	Transcribed, Korean	Transcribed, Japanese	Hunminjeongeum	Hanja/Kanji	Connections
0.0	0.0	Oro	Gorō	오로	五老	Main line
5.6	5.6	Dongyang	Tōyō	동양	東陽	
9.1	3.5	Songdang	Shōdō	송당	松堂	
11.4	2.3	Dongcheong	Tōsei	동정	東井	
13.3	4.2	Sangtong	Jōtsū	상통	上通	Songheung Line

咸南支線 - 함남지선 - Chōhō Branch - Jangpung Branch
Distance		Station name				
Total; km	S2S; km	Transcribed, Korean	Transcribed, Japanese	Hunminjeongeum	Hanja/Kanji	Connections
0.0	0.0	Pungsang	Hōjō	풍상	豊上	Main line
2.3	2.3	Jangpung	Chōhō	장풍	長豊	
