= CSIC HK-5000G =

Chinese carrier-based attack aircraft

The HK-5000G is a carrier-based unmanned combat aerial vehicle developed by China Shipbuilding Industry Corporation for reconnaissance and precision strike missions. It features folding wings, uses catapult assisted takeoff, has an endurance of 12 hours and weighs about 5 metric tons.

== See also ==
Related development

- Guizhou Soar Dragon

Aircraft of comparable role, configuration, and era

- BAE Systems Mantis
- Chengdu Sky Wing
- General Atomics MQ-9 Reaper

Related lists

- List of military aircraft of the PRC
- List of unmanned aerial vehicles of the People's Republic of China
