= Korean Empire won =

1900–1910 currency of the Korean Empire

圓 / 원 (Korean)
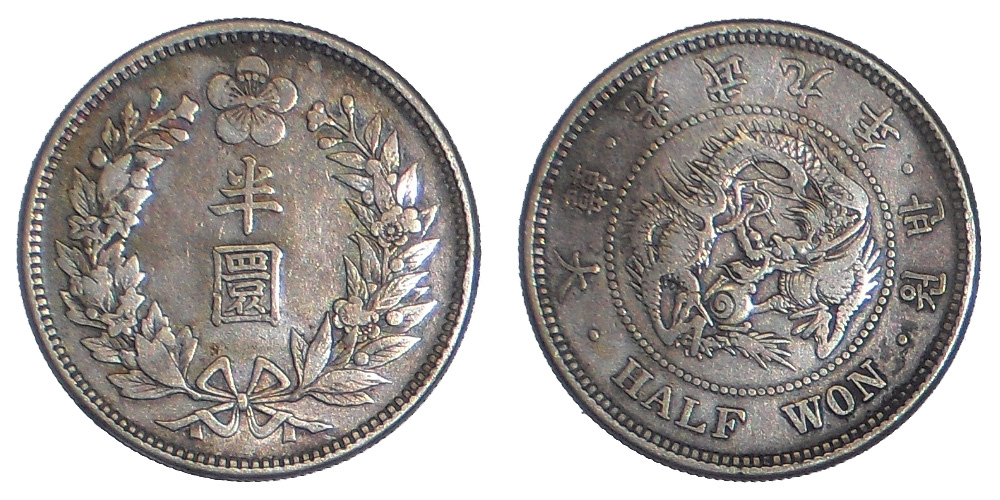
- A half won (半圜) coin issued in 1905.

Units of account
- Subunit
- 1/100: jeon (錢)

Demographics
- Date of introduction: 1900
- Replaced: Korean yang
- Replaced by: Korean yen and Japanese yen
- User(s): Korean Empire

Valuation
- Pegged with: (Empire of Japan) Japanese yen = 1 won

Korean name
- Hangul: 원; 전
- Hanja: 圓; 錢
- RR: won; jeon
- MR: wŏn; chŏn
- This infobox shows the latest status before this currency was rendered obsolete.

The Korean won (/wɒn/ won Korean: 원; Hanja: 圓, Korean pronunciation: [wʌn]) or Korean Empire won (대한제국 원), was the official currency of the Korean Empire between 1900 and 1910. It was subdivided into 100 jeon (/dʒʌn/ jun; 전; 錢, Korean pronunciation: [tɕʌn]).

== Etymology ==
Won is a cognate of the Chinese yuan and Japanese yen, which were both derived from the Spanish-American silver dollar. It is derived from the hanja 圓 (원, won), meaning "round", which describes the shape of the silver dollar.

== History ==
The Korean won, Chinese yuan and Japanese yen were all derived from the Spanish-American silver dollar, a coin widely used for international trade between Asia and the Americas from the 16th to 19th centuries.

On May 22, 1901 the Korean Empire adopted the gold standard in response to many other countries doing the same. The won was introduced in 1902, replacing the yang at a rate of 1 won = 10 yang. Units: 1 won = 100 jeon (錢), 1 jeon = 5 bun (分, "fun" ec. yesteryear spellings) of the preceding currency. Gold coins were produced in the denominations of 5, 10, and 20 won. All of these coins had a composition of 90% gold and 10% copper. Another notable feature of these coins is that they, unlike the earlier yang coinage, contained no English inscriptions as they only contained Chinese and Hangul legends.

As a part of the Russian influence in Korea at the time, the Koreans introduced a small number of "Russified" coins between the years 1901 and 1902, but these coins would prove to be unsuccessful as they were swept away by the flood of cupronickel coins.

The disagreements between the Japanese and Russian Empires led to the Russo-Japanese War when Japan attacked Port Arthur in Russian Dalian and Incheon in Korea, the war ended in a Japanese victory, Japan occupied the Kwantung Leased Territory and the Korean Peninsula. The Japanese immediately took control over Korean financial matters. On October 16, 1904 the Koreans accepted Baron Megata Tanetarō from the Japanese Ministry of Finance as financial adviser to their government, Megata was assigned to assume complete jurisdiction over Korea's finances. When Megata arrived in Korea, he told Sir John Newell Jordan, the British Minister-Resident in Korea at the time, that the Japanese protectorate over Korea was being modeled on British rule in Egypt. One of the first recommendations by Baron Megata was to close all Korean Mints and commence a reform of the Korean currency. One of the primary policies he proposed was removing the cupronickel coins from circulation.

After the Japanese had pressured the Korean Mint Bureau, which had been striking coins for 20 years, to close in November of the year 1904, all gold coins of the won were produced at the Japan Mint in Osaka (日本大阪造幣局). In 1905 the Japan Mint began to produce the Korean won's new coinage, this entirely new series was modeled almost exactly on the patterns of contemporary Japanese coins and even used the same planchets.

As the coins of the Korean won were being struck on the same planchets as the Japanese yen, when the Japanese would reduce the weight of the minor coinages of the yen in 1906, the weights and sizes of Korean coins were also reduced in 1907. This was also because the Japanese and Korean coins were circulating as equivalents to each other in exchange at the time.

In the year 1907 the imperial Korean government had designated the Japanese Dai-Ichi Bank to carry out the monetary reforms that were suggested by the Japanese adviser to Korea Baron Megata Tanetarō. The Dai-Ichi Bank attempted to withdraw the cupronickel coinage, recall the yeopjeon, and help circulate the newly introduced coinage that was minted in Osaka. During this era Korean cash coins were still largely circulating in the regions of southern and north-eastern Korea. The task of withdrawing the cupronickel coinage from circulation proved to not be an easy one because of the substantial number of counterfeit cupronickel coins that were circulating in Korea at the time, these counterfeit coins were redeemed by the Dai-Ichi Bank at reduced rates from the "official" cupronickel coins; during the exchange process, it was assumed by everybody that theirs cupronickel were "official" cupronickel coins and demanded the maximum exchange rate. The withdrawal of copper-alloy Korean cash coins was made easier due to a global rise in the price of copper, during this era thousands of pounds of copper-alloy Korean cash coins were exported at a profit.

In the year 1908, Korea was hit by a panic when the value of nickel dropped significantly, this led to the Korean public quickly exchanging their cupronickel at the banks. A staggering amount of 266.480,000 of cupronickel coins were exchanged during this panic. This panic would lead to the demonetisation of the Korean cupronickel coinage in November 1908. In the year 1909 there were supposedly 4,000,000 of 5 jeon nickel coins that were struck at the Japan Mint, however, most were melted down due to their demonetised status. Copper coins during this period were not affected by the panic exchange. Older coins collected by the banks from July 1905 to October 1907 resulted to be more than 375 tonnes. If it assumed that only cupronickel 5 fun coins of 7 grams were collected by the banks, more than 53,000,000 would have been collected from general circulation.

After 1908, circulation of the old cupronickel coins was outlawed by the imperial Korean government, while the cast copper-alloy cash coins remained to be legal tender in Korea at a value of 0.2 jeon, which meant that they had a nominal value of 1/500 won.

Prince Hirobumi Ito pointed out to the Korean government the anomalous situation of having a foreign (Japanese) commercial bank as the central bank of their government and recommended that the Koreans create their own central bank in the same way that others nations had, and so in 1909, the Bank of Korea (한국은행; 韓國銀行) was founded in Seoul as a central bank and began issuing currency of a modern type. And on 10 November 1909 many of the functions of the Dai-Ichi Bank were passed onto the newly established Bank of Korea.

The Bank of Korea assumed responsibility for the banknotes issued by the Dai-Ichi Bank that were still in circulation (which totalled 12,000,000 yen), the Dai-Ichi Bank would further transfer to the Bank of Korea the 4,000,000 yen in specie reserves which backed its banknotes. The balance was converted by the Bank of Korea to an interest-free 20-year loan to the Dai-Ichi Bank.

In the year 1910 the Japanese had formally annexed Korea, this meant that Korea's native currency system would become an arm of the Japanese currency system. As a part of the reforms of Korea during the colonial period Korean coinage was suspended; Japanese coinage was then introduced to the peninsula to replace it, although the Japanese created no "crash" program of recall, nine years later in 1919 as much as 25% of all Korean won coins remained in circulation as only 75% of the Korean coinage had been withdrawn by the Japanese.

The won was equivalent to the Japanese yen and was replaced by the Korean yen in 1910 during the Colonial Era. In 1911, the Bank of Korea was renamed the Bank of Chōsen (Korean: 조선은행; 朝鮮銀行), which issued notes denominated in yen and sen.

== Coins ==
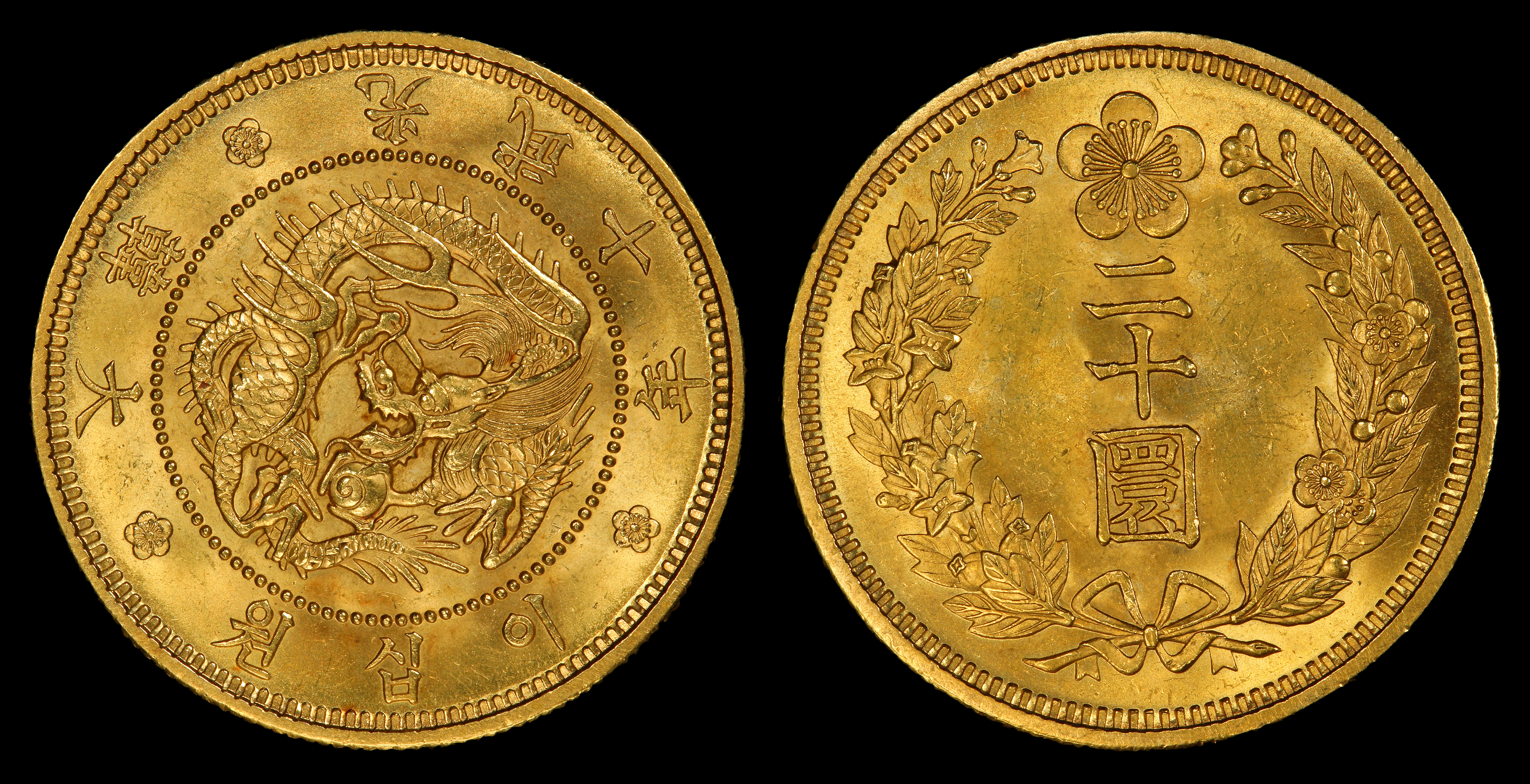
Korea 1907 20 gold Won

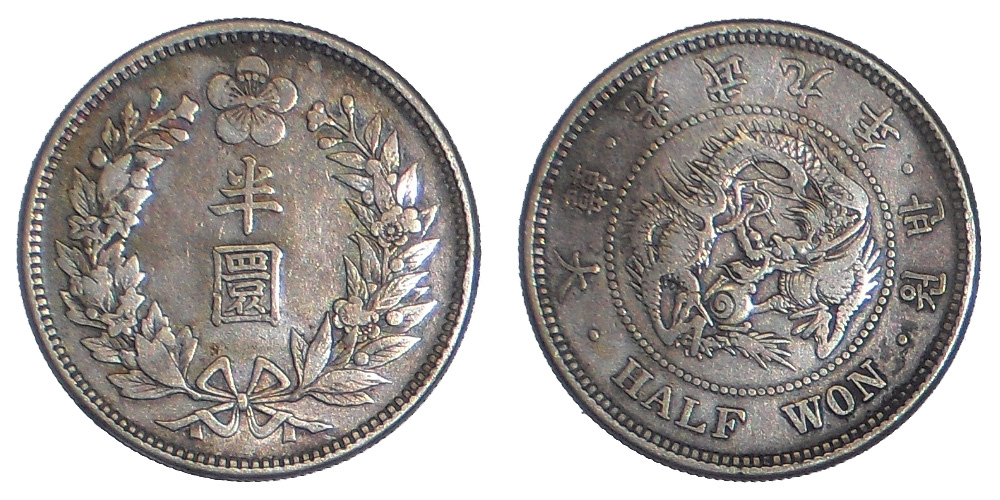
Korea 1905 ½ Won silver coin

Coins were minted in the denominations of 1/2, 1, 5, 10 and 20 jeon, 1/2, 5, 10 and 20 won. The coins all carried the title of the "state", Daehan (대한; 大韓), and the Korean era name, Gwangmu (광무; 光武) and then Yunghui (융희; 隆熙), whilst the specifications were equivalent to the coins of the Japanese yen.

In 1906 Korea's first gold coinage was created, in denominations of 5 won, 10 won, and 20 won. These coins were also of identical weight and fineness to their Japanese counterparts, but used a dragon which was similar to the previous generation of Japanese yen gold coins in their designs.

The dragon symbol was replaced by the phoenix on the 1/2 jeon, 1 jeon, and 5 jeon coins when these coins started being produced by the Japan Mint.

List of coins of the Korean won:

Korean Won Coins
Obverse	Reverse	Denomination	Composition	Diameter (in millimeters)	Weight (in grams)	Thickness (in millimeters)	Years of production
		1/2 jeon (半錢)	95% copper, 4% tin, 1% zinc	21.9 (1906); 19.1 (1907–1910)	3.4 (1906); 2.1 (1907–1910)	1.5 (1906); 1 (1907–1910)	1906–1910
		1 jeon (一錢)	98% copper, 1% tin, 1% zinc	28 (1905–1906); 22.5 (1907–1910)	7.1 (1905–1906); 4.1 (1907–1910)	1.5 (1905–1906); 1 (1907–1910)	1905–1910
		5 jeon (五錢)	Cupronickel (75% copper and 25% nickel)	20.8	4	2	1905, 1907, and 1909
		10 jeon (十錢)	80% silver, 20% copper	17.6	2.5, 2.25 (1907 only)	1.5	1906–1910
		20 jeon (二十錢)	80% silver, 20% copper	22.8 (1905–1906); 20.3 (1907–1910)	5.4 (1905–1906); 4 (1907–1910)	1.5	1905–1910
		1/2 won (半圜)	80% silver, 20% copper	31 (1905–1906); 27.5 (1907–1908)	13.5 (1905–1906); 10.13 (1907–1908)	2	1905–1908
		5 won (五圜)	90% gold, 10% copper	17	4.1666	1	1908–1909
		10 won (十圜)	90% gold, 10% copper	21.2	8.3	1.5	1906 and 1909
		20 won (二十圜)	90% gold, 10% copper	28.8	16.667	2	1906, 1908, and 1909

=== Rare coins ===
- There is some question as to whether or not any 1/2 jeon coins were minted in the year Gwangmu 11.
- The 1/2 jeon coins minted in the years 1907 (隆熙元年) and 1910 (隆熙四年) are known to be very scarce.
- In September 2011 a 5 jeon coin from 1909 was at auction for $138,000.
- The 5 won gold coins are dated to have been produced in the years 1908 (隆熙二年) and 1909 (隆熙三年). Only two known pieces of the 1909 version of the 5 won are known to be extent, one of these pieces was sold at an auction for $460,000 in September 2011.
- The 10 won gold coins are dated to have been produced in the years 1906 (光武十年) and 1909 (隆熙三年). Only two known pieces of the 1909 version of the coin are known to be extent with one specimen of this series being sold at an auction for $299,000 in September 2011.
- The 20 won gold coins are dated to have been produced in the years 1906 (光武十年), 1908 (隆熙二年), and 1909 (隆熙三年). Only two specimens of the 1909 coin are known to be extent with one specimen of this series being sold at an auction for $632,500 in September 2011.

== Banknotes ==
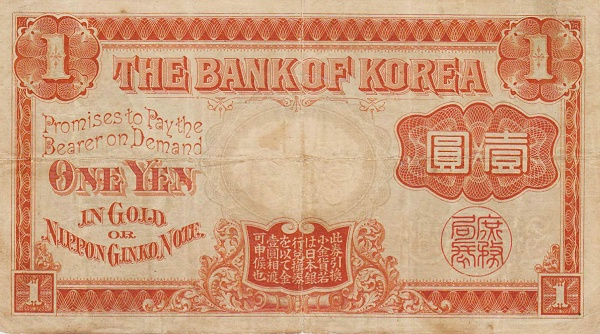
A banknote of 1 yen "in gold or Nippon Ginko notes" issued by the Bank of Korea in the year 1909.

No banknotes were issued denominated in won. However, Korean yen notes were issued by Dai-Ichi Ginko (First National Bank (of Japan), 주식회사제일은행, 株式會社第一銀行). The Dai-Ichi Bank's role as treasury bank for the imperial Korean government, its responsibility for recalling the old cupronickel and Korean cash coinage, and the fact that this bank issued the only banknotes that ever gained universal acceptance in Korea at the time emphasised the fact that the Dai-Ichi Bank held a status of being the de facto "Central Bank of Korea" until the founding of the Bank of Korea.

Both local banks and quasi-governmental firms had tried to establish a paper money system in Korea during this era, but none of their issues seemed to have been readily accepted by the public. The Dai-Ichi Bank had petitioned the imperial Japanese government to be granted permission to issue banknotes in Korea, to augment the demonetised Japanese yen coins that it was importing, this was because in the year 1885 the imperial government had monopolised the issuing of banknotes and prohibited banks from doing this in Japan.

After the imperial Japanese government has granted this permission, the Dai-Ichi Bank released banknotes in the year 1902 that were printed by the Japanese Finance Ministry Printing Bureau. In Southern Korea they were well received in the trade port cities, but faced rejection in the Russian influenced cities of Seoul and Incheon. This was because of the ongoing rivalry between Japan and Russia. In the year 1902 the Russians successfully petitioned the Korean government to ban all banknotes issued by the Dai-Ichi Bank, but this ban only lasted for a few months.

The Dai-Ichi Bank had enough fiscal and economic strength to redeem every banknote that was presented to them when they were banned from circulating, later the Dai-Ichi Bank was able to withstand yet another run on its banknotes, this meant that public confidence in the issues of the Dai-Ichi Bank grew in Korea which helped the bank succeed.

In the year 1905 the Dai-Ichi Bank had been designated the "treasury bank" for the Korean government, which meant that it served as the Korean government's agent for depositories and disbursing finances.

The Dai-Ichi Bank would issue fractional denomination banknotes (banknotes with denominations smaller than 1 yen) for the Imperial Japanese Army soldiers that were operating in northern Korea and Manchuria. Since these banknotes were printed by the Japanese Ministry of Finance, they were almost identical to the banknotes issued by the imperial Japanese government themselves for these same soldiers. The fractional banknotes issued by the Dai-Ichi Bank were seen as being very convenient, and were soon circulating all over the Korean peninsula.

Following the establishment of the Bank of Korea, it would immediately begin to issue its own banknotes, these new banknotes were redeemable "in gold or Nippon Ginko notes." Most of the reserves held by the Bank of Korea at the time were banknotes issued by the Bank of Japan and commercial paper.

== Korean "Eagle" coins ==
Following the Japanese victory during the First Sino-Japanese War, the Qing dynasty's influence over the Korean Peninsula was replaced by that of the Japanese Empire. Furthermore China's weakened position during this era allowed for the interests of the Russian Empire in the Far East to expand significantly as well. The Russian Empire sent Mr. Alexiev as the financial advisor to Korea. On March 1, 1898 the first branch of the Russo-Korean Bank in Asia was established. In the year 1901, Alexiev authorised the minting of a new set of three coins, these were Korean "Eagle" coins were issued by the Russo-Korean Bank.

These coins are known as the Korean "Eagle" coins because the fact that instead of having a Korean dragon or Korean phoenix in their design they have a crowned eagle based on the coat of arms of Russia. All of the Korean "Eagle" coins were minted at the Yongsan Mint (龍山典局). These coins would prove to be unsuccessful as they were swept away by the flood of cupronickel coins.

The Russo-Korean bank also created a set of experimental coins (or "trial coins") that were produced but never saw any circulation. This unissued coin series included a copper 10 won (十圜), a copper 20 won (二十圜), and a silver "half dollar" (半圜, "half won"). While all of these unissued Korean "Eagle" coins were reportedly minted in the year 1901, the coins display various other dates such as 1899, 1901, 1902, or 1903.

Following the Japanese victory during the Russo-Japanese War and Korea becoming a Japanese protectorate under the Eulsa Treaty, the Japanese would confiscate and destroy almost all Korean "Eagle" coins. Because of this, surviving Korean "Eagle" coins are extremely rare.

List of issued Korean "Eagle" coins:

Korean "Eagle" Coins Issued by the Russo-Korean Bank
Obverse	Reverse	Denomination	Composition	Diameter (in millimeters)	Weight (in grams)	Thickness (in millimeters)	Years of production
		1 jeon (一錢)	98% copper, 1% tin, 1% zinc	28	8		1902 (光武六年)
		5 jeon (五錢)	Cupronickel (75% copper, 25% nickel)	20.5	5.4		1902 (光武六年)
		1/2 won (半圜)	90% silver, 10% copper	30.9	13.5	2	1901 (光武五年)

List of unissued Korean "Eagle" pattern coins:

Unissued Korean "Eagle" pattern coins created by the Russo-Korean Bank
Obverse	Reverse	Denomination	Composition	Diameter (in millimeters)	Weight (in grams)	Thickness (in millimeters)	Dates on the coins
		10 won (十圜)	Copper				1903 (光武七年)
		20 won (二十圜)	Copper				1902 (光武六年)

=== Rare Korean "Eagle" coins ===
- A specimen of a 1 jeon Korean "Eagle" coin dated 1902 (光武六年) sold at an auction for $149,500 in September 2011.
- A specimen of a 20 won Korean "Eagle" coin dated 1902 (光武六年) sold at the same auction as the coin above for $115,000 in September 2011.

== See also ==
- Names of Korea
- Economy of South Korea
- Economy of North Korea

Preceded by: Korean yang Reason: heavier influence by Japan; Ratio: 1 won = 10 yang	Currency of Korea; 1902 – 1910; Concurrent with: Korean yen	Succeeded by: Korean yen Reason: complete annexation by Japan; Ratio: at par
