= Changjin Line =

Railway line in North Korea

Overview
- Native name: 장진선(長津線)
- Status: Operational
- Owner: Sinhŭng Railway (1934–1938); Chosen Railway (1938–1945); Korean State Railway (since 1945)
- Locale: South Hamgyŏng
- Termini: Yŏnggwang; Sasu
- Stations: 13

Service
- Type: Heavy rail, Regional rail

History
- Opened: 1 October 1926 (Yŏnggwang—Sangt'ong); 1 September 1934 (Sangt'ong—Samgŏ); 1 November 1934 (Samgŏ—Kujin)
- Closed: 15 July 1935 (Sindae—Kujin); 30 Aug. 1935 (Sasu—Sindae)

Technical
- Line length: 58.6 km (36.4 mi)
- Number of tracks: Single track
- Track gauge: 762 mm (2 ft 6 in)
- Electrification: 1500 V DC Overhead line
- Maximum incline: 370‰
Route map
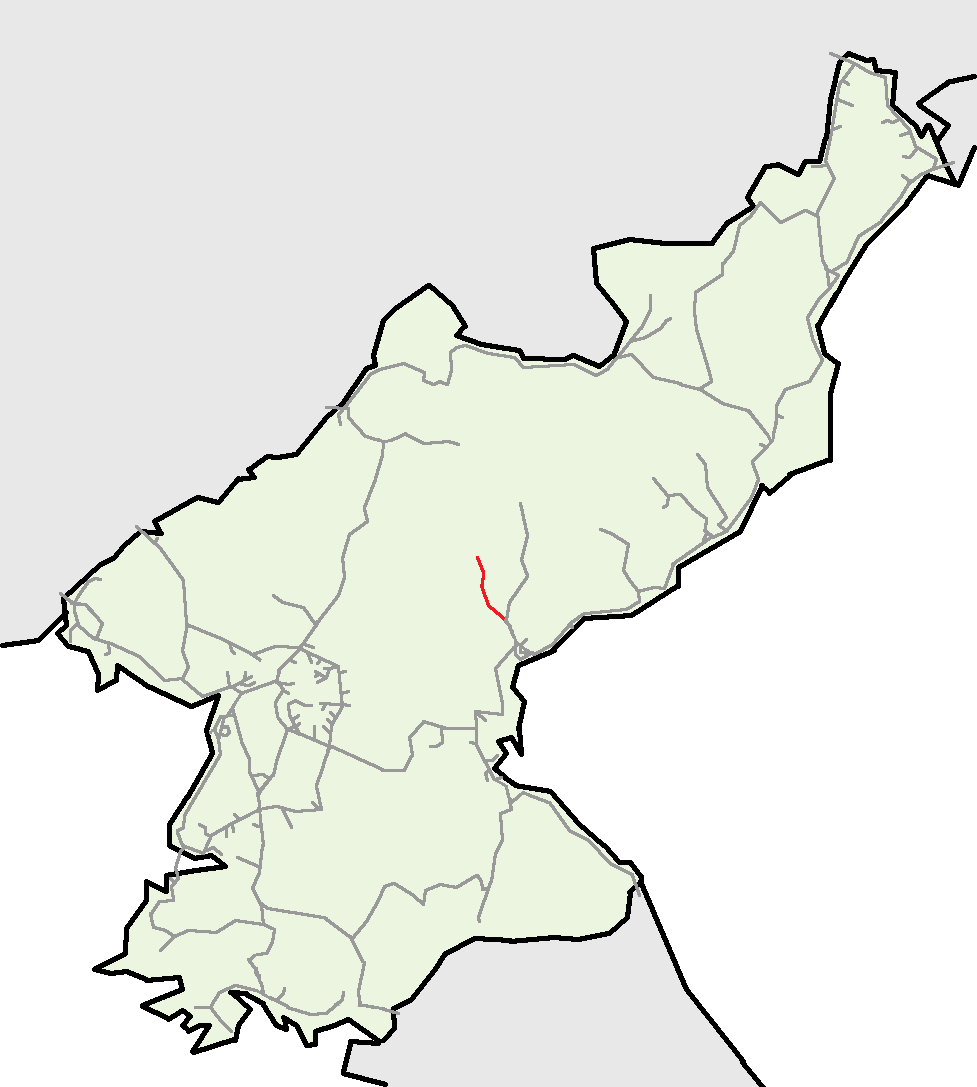

- Changjin Line
- Hangul: 장진선
- Hanja: 長津線
- RR: Jangjinseon
- MR: Changjinsŏn

The Changjin Line (Korean: 장진선) is an electrified narrow gauge line of the North Korean State Railway running from Yŏnggwang on the Sinhŭng Line to Sasu on Lake Changjin. There is a 7.4 km (4.6 mi) cable-hauled section between Samgo and Hwangch'oryong; between Pojang and Hwangch'oryong the grade reaches 370‰.

== History ==
In 1923 the privately owned Sinhŭng Railway opened the mainline of its Hamnam Line (not to be confused with the line of the same name of the Chosen Magnesite Development Railway, nowadays called Kŭmgol Line), from Hamhŭng to Sinhŭng via Oro (nowadays called Yŏnggwang), and subsequently expanded the line with the addition of a branch from Oro to Sangt'ong that was opened on 1 October 1926.

In 1934, to aid in the construction of a new hydroelectric power plant on the Changjin River, and to exploit forestry and other resources in the area, the Sinhŭng Railway began opening its Changjin Line. The first section, from Sangt'ong to Samgŏ, was opened on 1 September 1934, followed by an extension from Samgŏ to Kujin on 1 November of the same year. Later, the Sindae—Kujin section was closed on 15 July 1935, followed by the closure of the Sasu—Sindae section on 30 August 1935.

The Sinhŭng Railway was bought and absorbed by the Chosen Railway on 22 April 1938.

Following the establishment of the DPRK, all railways in North Korea were nationalised, becoming part of the Korean State Railway. The Chosen Railway's Hamnam, Songhŭng and Changjin Lines were split up, with the mainline of the Hamnam Line and the Songhŭng Line merged to become the Sinhŭng Line, while the Yŏnggwang—Sang'tong branch was split off from the Hamnam Line and added to the Changjin Line, and the line was later electrified. Although the Hamhŭng—Sinhŭng section was rebuilt to standard gauge by the Korean State Railway, the Changjin Line remained narrow gauge.

== Services ==
Although significant for passenger transport in the area, the bulk of the trains on the Changjin Line are for freight transport, with the majority of traffic being outbound cargo - in the mid 1980s, 62.1% of all freight traffic originated on the line for shipment elsewhere, while only 37.9% being traffic from elsewhere destined for points on the line. Wood accounts for the vast majority of outbound freight - up to 78.8% in the 1980s, with grain, ore and metals being the other major commodities. Of inbound goods, coal is the most important at 36.7% of the total (of which up to 20% is anthracite), followed by rice and other grains (18.9%), fertiliser (11.9%), sea products (8.2%) and cement (4.2%).

== Route ==
A yellow background in the "Distance" box indicates that section of the line is not electrified; a pink background indicates that section is 2 ft 6 in (762 mm) narrow gauge; an orange background indicates that section is non-electrified narrow gauge.

Distance (km)		Station Name		Former Name		
Total	S2S	Transcribed	Chosŏn'gŭl (Hanja)	Transcribed	Chosŏn'gŭl (Hanja)	Connections
0.0	0.0	Yŏnggwang	영광 (栄光)	Oro	오로 (五老)	Sinhŭng Line
5.6	5.6	Tongyang	동양 (東陽)			
9.1	3.5	Songdang	송당 (松堂)			
~~11.4~~	~~2.3~~	Tongchŏng	동정 (東井)			Closed.
13.3	4.2	Sangt'ong	상통 (上通)			
17.4	4.1	Ryongsu	룡수 (龍水)			
23.4	6.0	Hagich'ŏn	하기천 (下岐川)			
28.4	5.0	Samgŏ	삼거 (三巨)			
32.0	3.6	Pojang	부장 (堡庄)			
35.8	3.8	Hwangch'oryŏng	황초령 (黄草嶺)			
41.2	5.4	Kot'o	고토 (古土)			
~~46.4~~	~~5.2~~	Pusŏng	부성 (富盛)			Closed.
49.2	2.8	Sangp'yŏng	상평 (上坪)			
54.3	5.1	Changjin	장진 (長津)			
58.6	4.0	Sasu	사수 (泗水)			
~~62.7~~	~~4.1~~	Sindae	신대 (新垈)			Closed 15 July 1935.
~~68.4~~	~~5.2~~	Chungnam	중남 (中南)			Closed 15 July 1935.
~~75.1~~	~~5.2~~	Kujin	구진 (舊津)			Closed 15 July 1935.
