= Kadam station =

Railway station in North Korea

Kadam 가담

Korean name
- Hangul: 가담역
- Hanja: 가담驛
- Revised Romanization: Kadam-yeok
- McCune–Reischauer: Kadam-yŏk

General information
- Location: Sŏhŭng-dong, Tonghŭngsan-guyŏk, Hamhŭng-si, South Hamgyŏng; North Korea
- Owner: Korean State Railway
- Platforms: 1
- Tracks: 2

History
- Opened: 10 June 1923
- Former names: Hŭngsang
- Original company: Sinhŭng Railway

Services
| Preceding station | Korean State Railway | Following station |
|---|---|---|
| Pumin towards Sinhŭng | Sinhŭng Line (1435 mm) | Hamhŭng Terminus |
Location

Kadam station is a railway halt in Sŏhŭng-dong, Tonghŭngsan-guyŏk, Hamhŭng city, South Hamgyŏng province, North Korea, on the Sinhŭng Line of the Korean State Railway.

== History ==
The station, originally called Hŭngsang station, was opened on 10 June 1923 by the Sinhŭng Railway as part of the 17.0 km (10.6 mi) first section of its Hamnam Line between Hamhŭng and Oro. The Sinhŭng Railway was bought and absorbed by the Chosen Railway on 22 April 1938. The station received its current name after the establishment of the DPRK.
