= Hamnam Line =

Hamnam Line may refer to:

- Hamnam Line (Chōtetsu)
- former name of Kŭmgol Line
- former name of Sinhŭng Line (Hamhung to Yŏnggwang)
