= Bank of Chōsen =

Central bank of colonial Korea

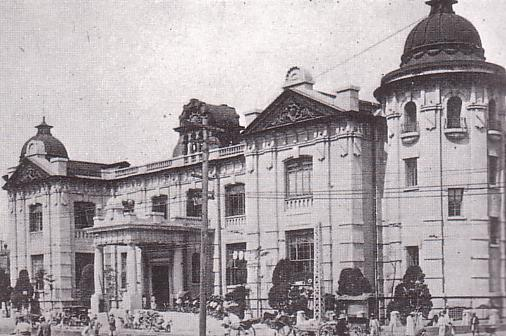
- Head office in Keijō, before 1945

Japanese name
- Kanji: 朝鮮銀行
Transcriptions
- Romanization: Chōsen Ginkō

Korean name
- Hangul: 조선은행
- Hanja: 朝鮮銀行
Transcriptions
- Revised Romanization: Joseon Eunhaeng
- McCune–Reischauer: Chosŏn Ŭnhaeng

The Bank of Chōsen (Japanese: 朝鮮銀行, romanized: Chōsen Ginkō, Korean: 조선은행 Joseon Eunhaeng), known from 1909 to 1911 as the Bank of Korea (Japanese: 韓國銀行 Kankoku Ginkō, Korean: 한국은행 Hanguk Eunhaeng) and transcribed after 1945 as Bank of Joseon, was a colonial bank that served as bank of issue for Korea under Japanese rule as well as being a commercial bank, with significant operations beyond Korea until 1945. Formed in 1909 by reorganization of the former Korean operations of Japan's Dai-Ichi Bank, it issued the Korean yen from 1910 to 1945. Its seat was initially established in Seoul (known at the time as Hanseong, then Keijō), relocated to Tokyo in May 1924, and subsequently relocated back to Keijō. It has been described as "a primary component of Japanese foreign expansionism".

Following the division of Korea in 1945, the Bank of Chōsen was succeeded in North Korea by the Central Bank of the DPRK. In South Korea, it continued its activity and issued the South Korean won until 1950, when it was replaced by the Bank of Korea. Its branches in Japan were liquidated in October 1945, with some of the assets forming the basis for the later establishment of Nippon Fudosan Bank in 1957.

== Establishment ==
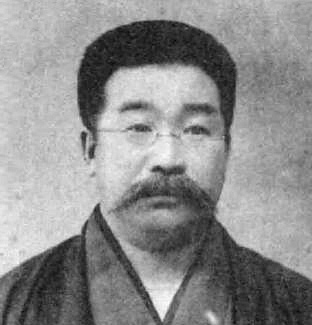
Ichihara Morihiro (1858-1915), the first president of the Bank of Korea / Bank of Chōsen

Following the Japan–Korea Treaty of 1905 which reduced the Korean Empire to a Japanese protectorate, the dominant status which Dai-Ichi Bank had enjoyed in Korea since 1878 became a matter of debate in Japan. In August 1907, Japan's Resident-General Itō Hirobumi and Dai-Ichi Bank's head Shibusawa Eiichi agreed that Dai-Ichi's operations should be eventually transferred to a dedicated central bank for the territory. A debate ensued between Itō and the Japanese finance ministry, with the latter favoring the creation of a Korean branch of the Bank of Japan over that of a stand-alone colonial institution over which Tokyo would have less direct control. Eventually Itō's position won the debate, and the finance ministry rationalized the decision as preferable to preserve financial stability. The new Bank of Korea was created by Japanese law of July 1909, largely modelled on the Bank of Taiwan (est. 1898) but with a greater role for Itō in its governance than in the Taiwanese precedent. Dai-Ichi Bank kept its branches in Seoul and Busan but later in 1909 transferred all its other Korean branches and offices to the Bank of Korea, totalling 220 regular employees and 121 support staff in Chinnampo, Daegu, Gunsan, Hamhung, Incheon, Kaesong, Kyongsong, Masan, Mokpo, Pyongyang, Songjin, Wonsan, and across the Yalu River in Andong. The transfer also included central operations and the new building initially planned by Dai-Ichi Bank for itself in Seoul, then still under construction and which became the Bank of Korea's head office.

The Bank of Korea assumed responsibility for the Dai-Ichi Bank's notes in circulation, which totalled 12,000,000 yen, and Dai-Ichi Bank would further transfer to the Bank of Korea the 4,000,000 yen in specie reserves which backed its banknotes. The balance was converted by the Bank of Korea to a loan of 20 years without interest to the Dai-Ichi Bank. The new institution's first president was Ichihara Morihiro, a former mayor of Yokohama who had joined Dai-Ichi Bank in 1906 to run its Korean network and kept the position until his death in October 1915.

== Japanese colonial era ==
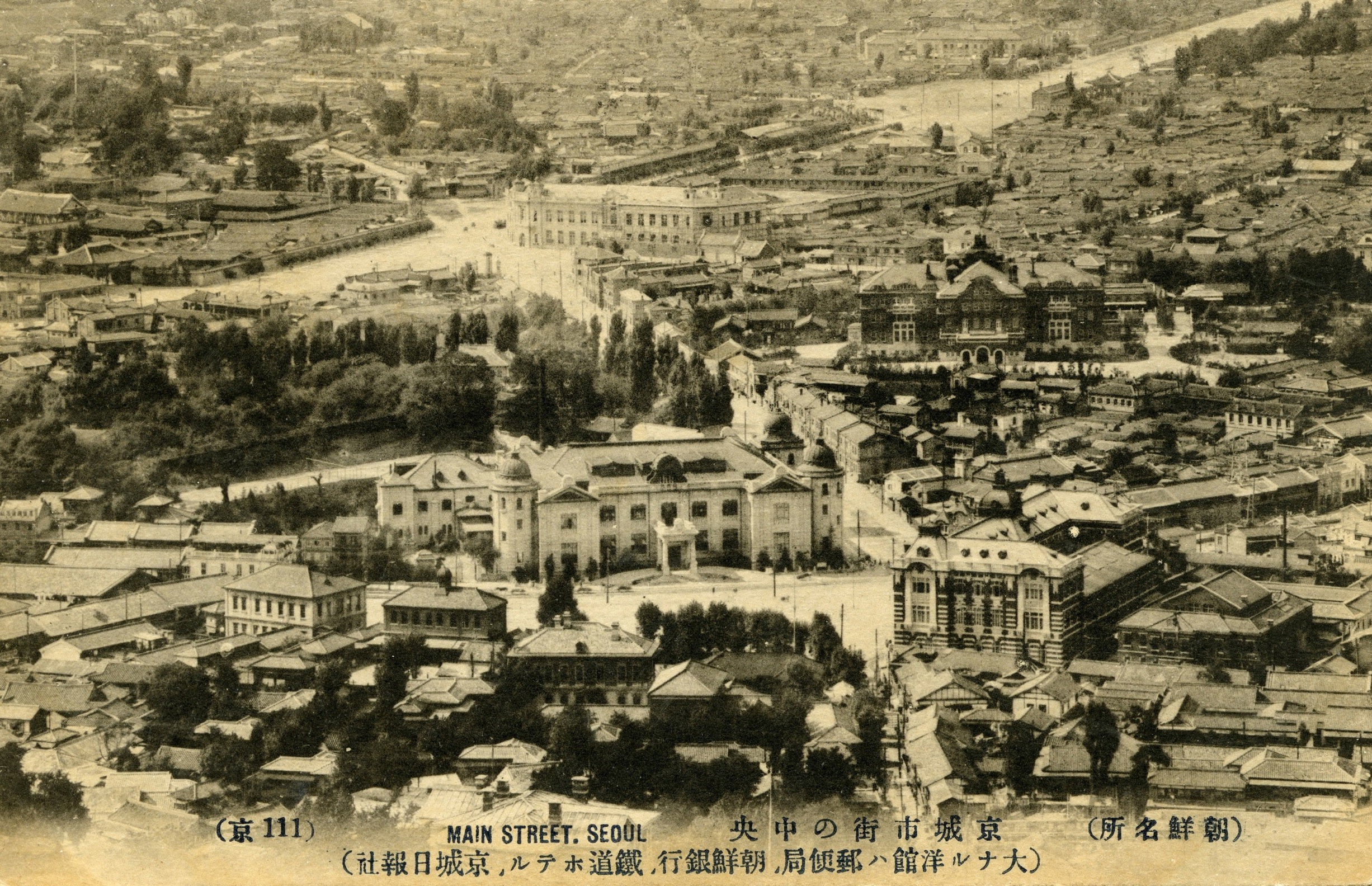
Aerial view of the Bank of Chōsen's head office (center) in the late 1910s. Also visible are the Keijō Post Office (completed 1915) on the right and the newly extended Jongno in the background, with the first Seoul City Hall (behind the bank) and the Chōsen Hotel (1914, behind the Post Office)

Following the Japan–Korea Treaty of 1910 and full annexation, the Bank of Korea was renamed the Bank of Chōsen by Japanese law in March 1911. The bank remained a joint-stock company owned by a number of Japanese banks and companies, with a board appointed by the Governor-General of Chōsen. Its monetary role was modelled on that of the Bank of Japan, with the key difference that it was allowed to use BOJ banknotes as currency reserve alongside gold and silver. It was responsible for issuing currency in Korea, regulated domestic prices, serviced international trade. Its banknotes had legal tender status in Korea and also in the Kwantung Leased Territory and the South Manchuria Railway Zone; they could be exchanged one-to-one with those of the Bank of Japan.

The total amount of the Bank of Chōsen's banknotes increased from 13.5 million yen at end-1909 to 20 million at end-1910 and 28.6 million in April 1912, then declined to 22.9 million by end-1914 and rose again to 34 million (end-1915), 47 million (end-1916) and 68 million (end-1917). This expansion reflected both economic growth in Korea and the bank's expansion into Northeast China and beyond. The bank opened branches and offices in Mukden (July 1913), Dalian (August 1913), Changchun (September 1913), Siping (February 1914), Kaiyuan (September 1915), Harbin (July 1916), Yingkou (September 1916), Fujiadian (December 1916), Longjingzun (March 1917), Jilin (June 1917), Qingdao (October 1917), Zhengjiatun (March 1918), Shanghai (April 1918), Manzhouli (September 1918), and Qiqihar (November 1918). In June 1916, the Bank of Chōsen started lending directly to the Fengtian government.

Alexandrovsky's Chōsen Bank branch c. 1923

In December 1917, it took over Manchurian operations of the Yokohama Specie Bank, including its issuance privilege and branches in Lüshun, Liaoyang, Tieling and Andong, while acting as a fiscal agent for the Japanese government in the Kwantung Leased Territory. The YSB's banknotes were withdrawn and replaced with notes of the Bank of Chōsen which already circulated widely in Manchuria, while the YSB retained activity in the territory as a commercial bank. The Bank of Chōsen also expanded its gold purchasing operations into Manchuria, opening an assaying office at its branch in Changchun that complemented the ones it had inherited from Dai-Ichi Bank in Seoul, Pyongyang and Wonsan. The Bank of Chōsen thus became the dominant supplier of gold to Japan's mint in Osaka, representing between 27 and 57 percent of its gold supply between 1910 and 1917. The branches in Manzhouli and Qiqihar were created in the context of the Japanese intervention in Siberia, during which the Bank of Chōsen also temporarily established offices in Khabarovsk, Vladivostok, and other outposts occupied by the Japanese army. During the Japanese occupation of northern Sakhalin, a branch would open in Alexandrovsky and operate until 1925. The Vladivostok branch remained active until 1931. By 1919, the bank had 18 branches in Manchuria, where its operations were more profitable than in Korea where it only had 10 branches. Following the Japanese financial downturn of 1920, however, the bank pared down its Manchurian lending and note issuance, leading to calls by Japanese businessmen in Manchuria for the establishment of a separate local bank of issue.

In the 1923 Great Kantō earthquake, the Bank of Chōsen's branch in Tokyo was destroyed by fire and the bank suffered heavy losses, following which the Japanese finance ministry and Bank of Japan supported it with large-scale long-term lending. In February 1924, new legislation deprived the Governor-General of Chōsen of his prior role in the governance of the bank, which came under the sole supervision of the Ministry of Finance. In May 1924, the bank's head office and senior leadership relocated to Tokyo. The bank's structure was reorganized with a director in Seoul (Keijō) overseeing operations in Korea, another one in Dalian (Dairen) overseeing those in Manchuria, and the leadership in Tokyo overseeing all other foreign operations (e.g. in China) together with those in Mainland Japan.

By 1929, the Bank of Chōsen had 19 offices outside of Japan and its colonies, the second-largest such network among all Japanese banks, surpassed only by the Yokohama Specie Bank. In Japan it had branches in Tokyo, Osaka, Kobe, and Shimonoseki.

In the mid-1930s, the Bank of Chōsen's notes still circulated widely in Manchuria, even after the creation of the Central Bank of Manchou in 1932. Eventually, the Bank of Chōsen created a 50-50 joint venture with the Manchukuo government, the Manchurian Industrial Bank, fully guaranteed by the government and which on 1 January 1936 took over all Manchurian branches of the Bank of Chōsen as well as those of the Manchurian Bank and Shoryu Bank, so sixty branches in total. While it retreated from direct activity in Manchuria, the Bank of Chōsen expanded into North China in May 1936 by establishing a central bank for the East Hebei Autonomous Government, known as the Chi Tung Bank. In 1937 as the Second Sino-Japanese War started, the Bank of Chōsen became the financial agent of the invading Japanese Army and established offices in the major cities it captured (and superseding the Chi Tung Bank in East Hebei).

As a consequence of the conscription of Japanese men, the share of Koreans in the Bank of Chōsen's workforce rose steadily, from 16 percent in 1928 to 22 percent in 1939, 33 percent (455 Korean staff) by March 1945, and 35 to 40 percent by the war's end in August 1945.

== Postwar development and transition to the Bank of Korea ==
Logo of the Bank of Chōsen in South Korea, 1946-1950

In the disruption associated with the surrender of Japan and division of Korea in 1945, the Bank of Chōsen's eight branches north of the 38th parallel (in Pyongyang, Chinnampo, Haeju, Hamhung, Wonsan, Sinuiju, Rajin, and Chongjin) came under the control of the Red Army and consequently of North Korea. In December 1945, the Pyongyang branch created a temporary monetary office, known as the "calculation office". On 9 January 1946, the central bank of North Korea was created with use of all eight branches, but remained under the control of the Soviet Armed Forces. On 29 October 1946, most other banks in the territory were merged into the central bank, which was taken over by the North Korean government's finance ministry from the Soviet forces. The central bank was renamed the Central Bank of the Democratic People's Republic of Korea on 6 December 1947.

In the South, by comparison, the Bank of Chōsen (now transcribed as Bank of Joseon) did not itself undergo significant change in the late 1940s. The U.S. Army Military Government used it to fund its operations, triggering inflation. The bank benefited from the arrival of qualified employees who took refuge from the harsh occupation in the North. A policy debate arose as to which existing institution would be best suited to become the monetary authority of the newly independent South Korean state, for which the Bank of Joseon competed with the Joseon Industrial Bank and Chohung Bank. Eventually, legislation promulgated on 5 May 1950 established the Bank of Korea and granted it the former assets and operations of the Bank of Joseon, the latter being placed into liquidation as a way to shield the new central bank from possible claims of Japanese stakeholders.

The mainland Japanese assets and operations of the Bank of Chōsen were nationalized in 1945, and reorganized in 1957 as the Japanese Real Estate Bank or Nippon Fudosan Bank. It was renamed in 1977 as the Nippon Credit Bank, rescued in 1997 by the Japanese government, and privatized in 2001 as Aozora Bank.

== Buildings ==
Like other banks of its era, the Bank of Chōsen invested in high-quality architecture. Its Seoul (Hanseong / Keijō) head office was originally planned for Dai-Ichi Bank in 1907, on a design by Tatsuno Kingo who had also designed the Tokyo headquarters of the Bank of Japan a decade earlier. The building was under construction when the Bank of Korea was established, and only completed in 1912 after rebranding as Bank of Chōsen. It was heavily damaged during the Korean War, reopened after repairs in 1956-1958, renovated in 1987-1989, and reopened in 2001 as the Bank of Korea Money Museum.

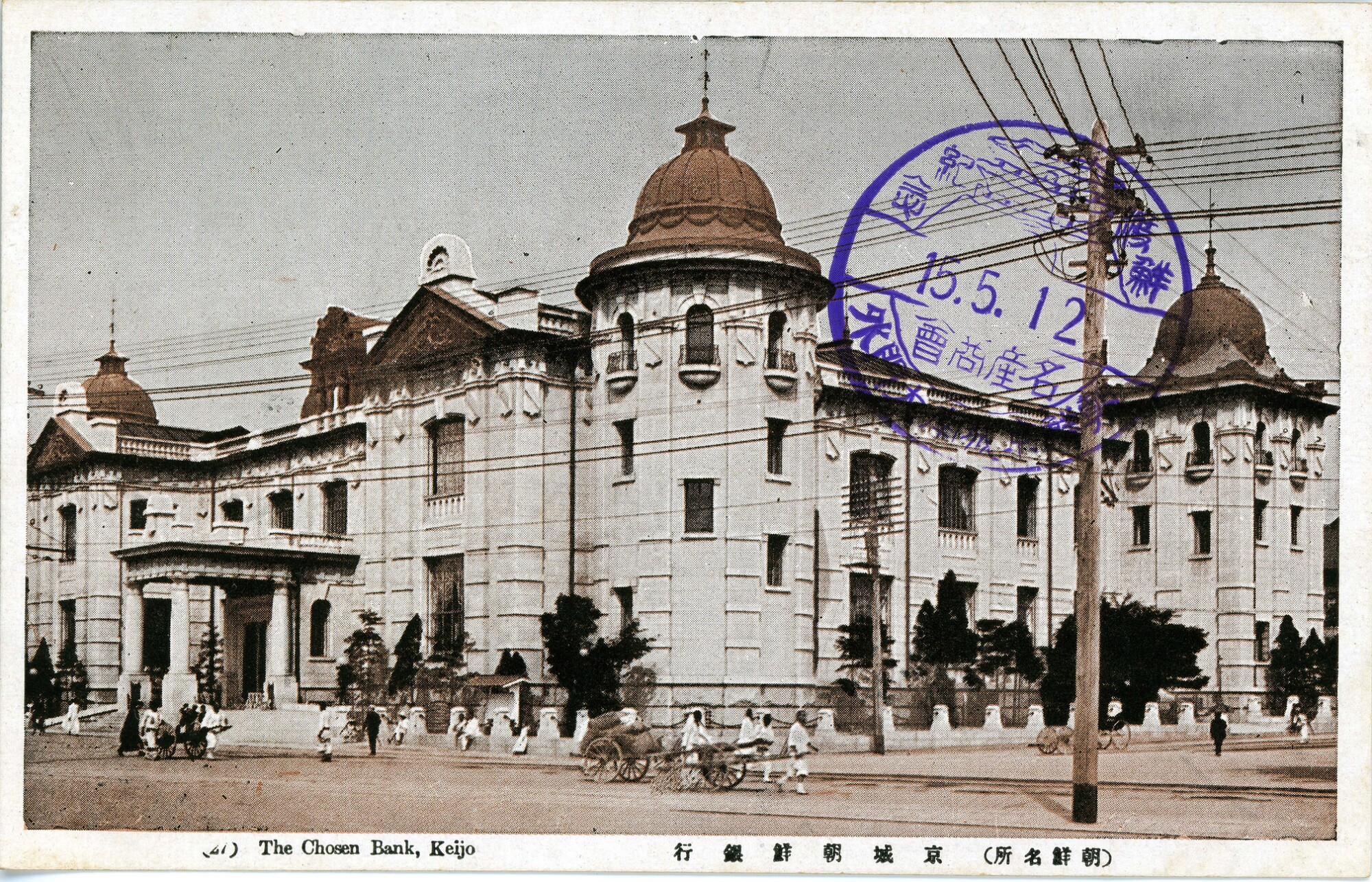
Head office upon completion in 1912

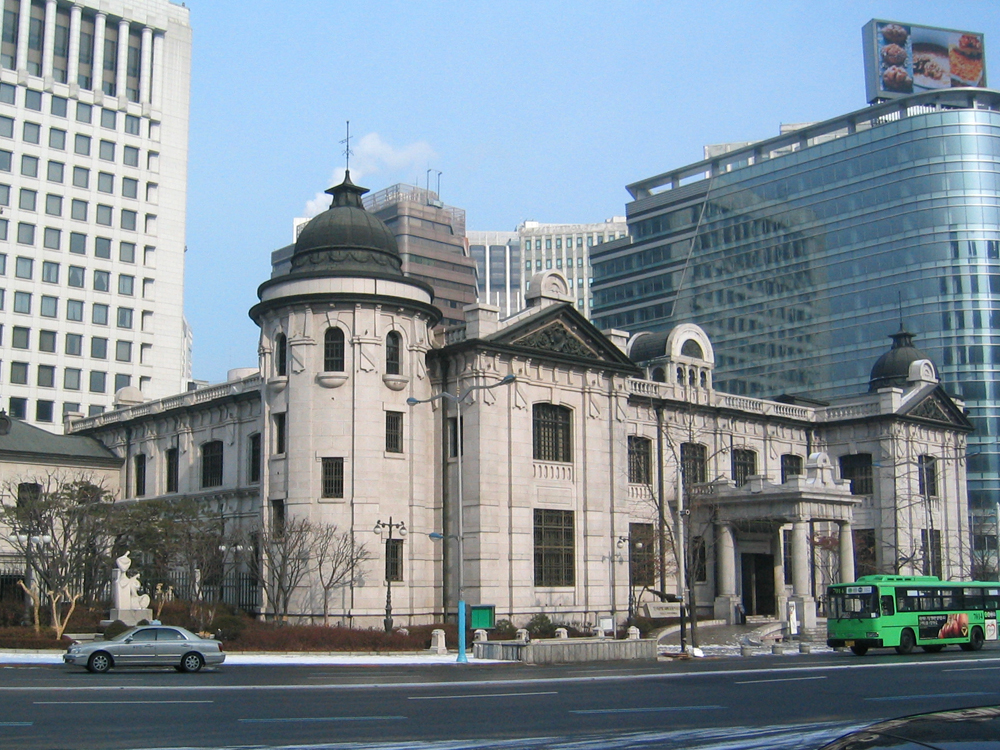
Former head office in 2005, after repurposing as Money Museum

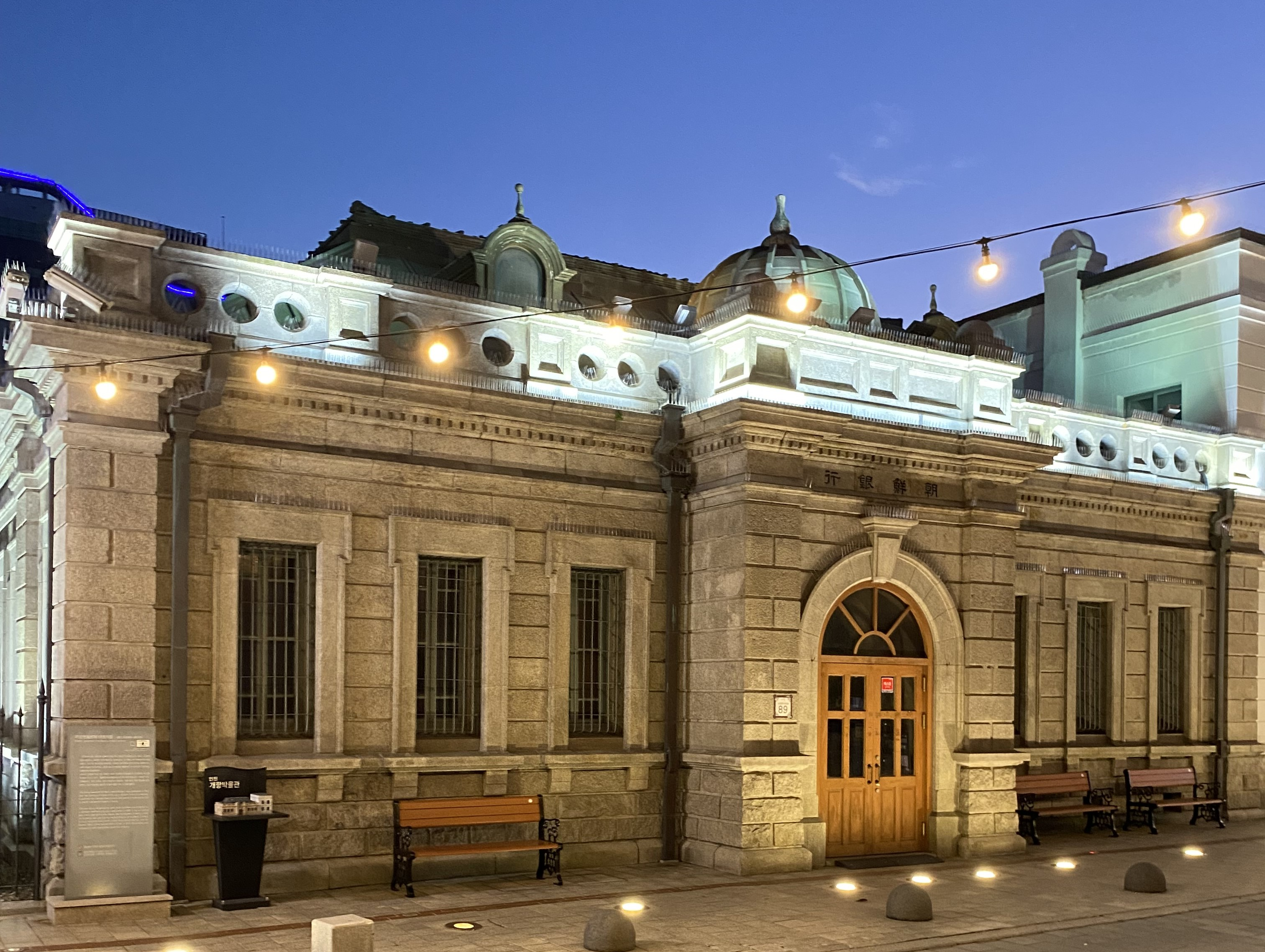
Former branch in Incheon, inherited from Dai-Ichi Bank

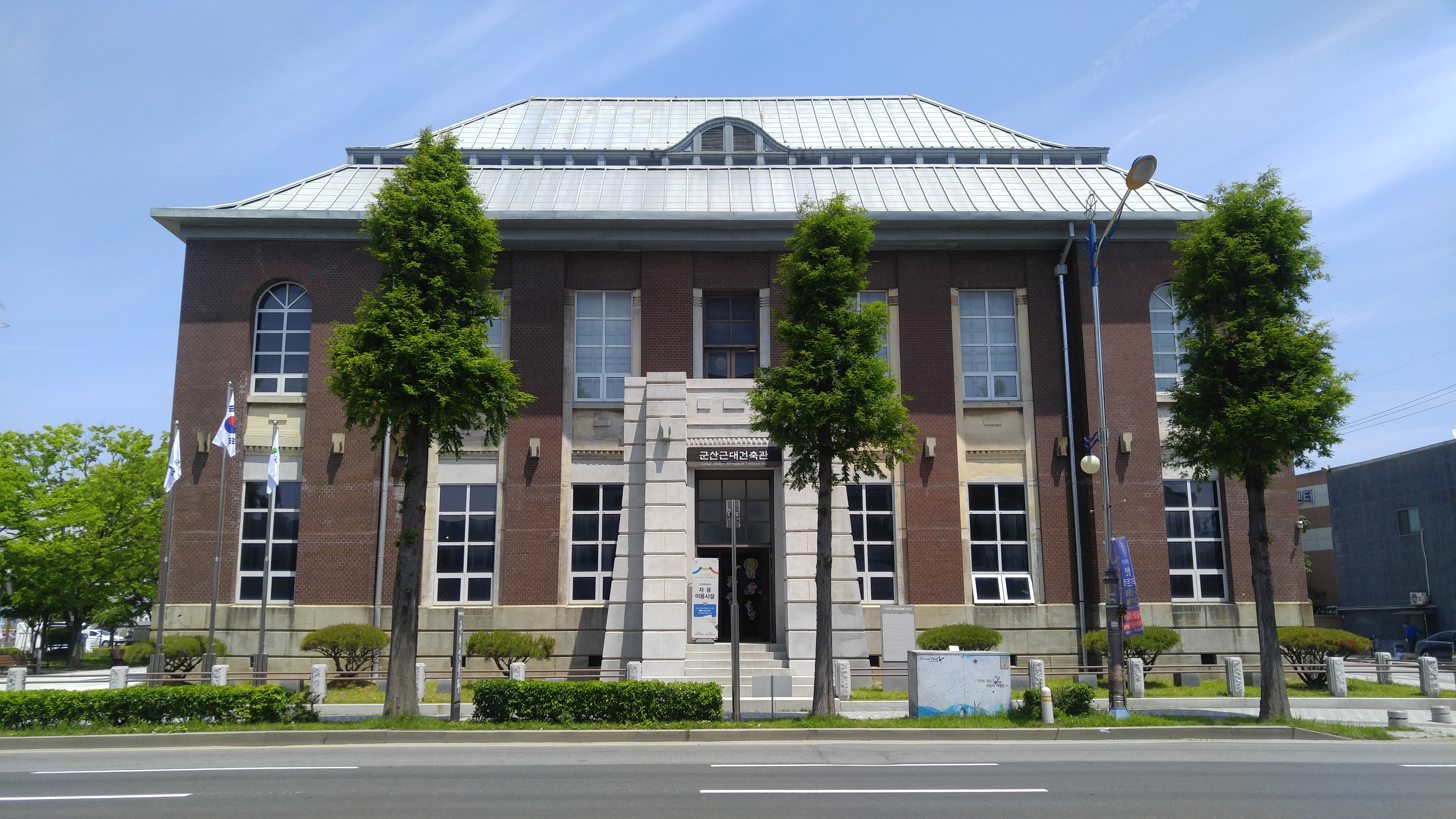
Former branch in Gunsan, repurposed as Modern Architecture Museum

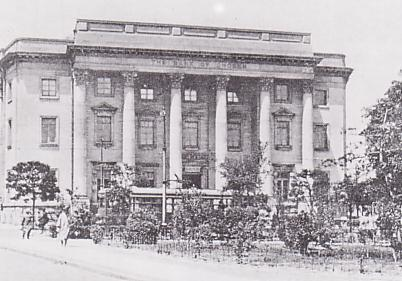
Former branch in Dalian, built in 1920, photographed before 1945

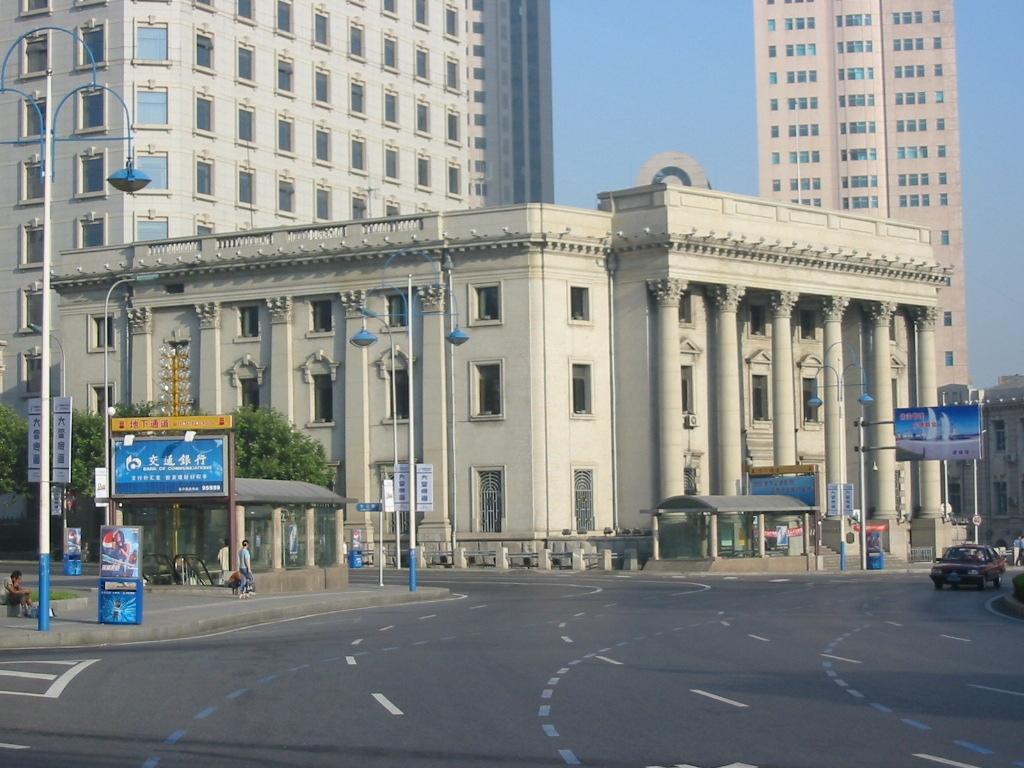
The same building in 2005

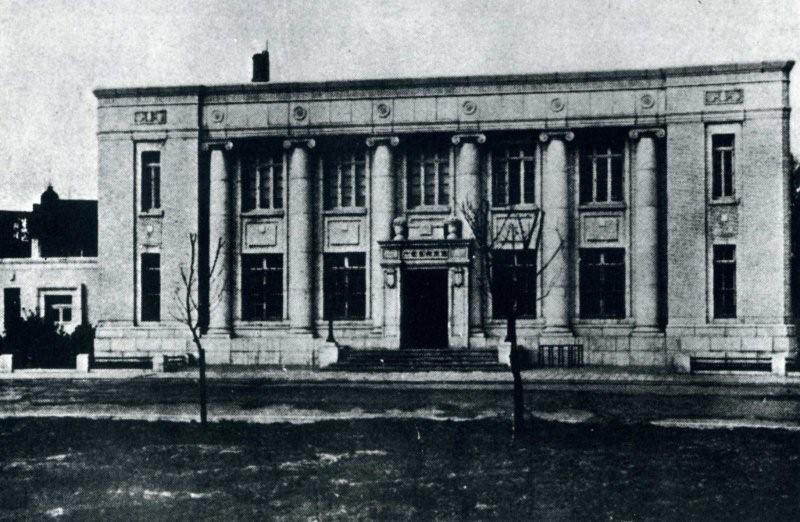
Former branch in Shenyang, photographed before 1945

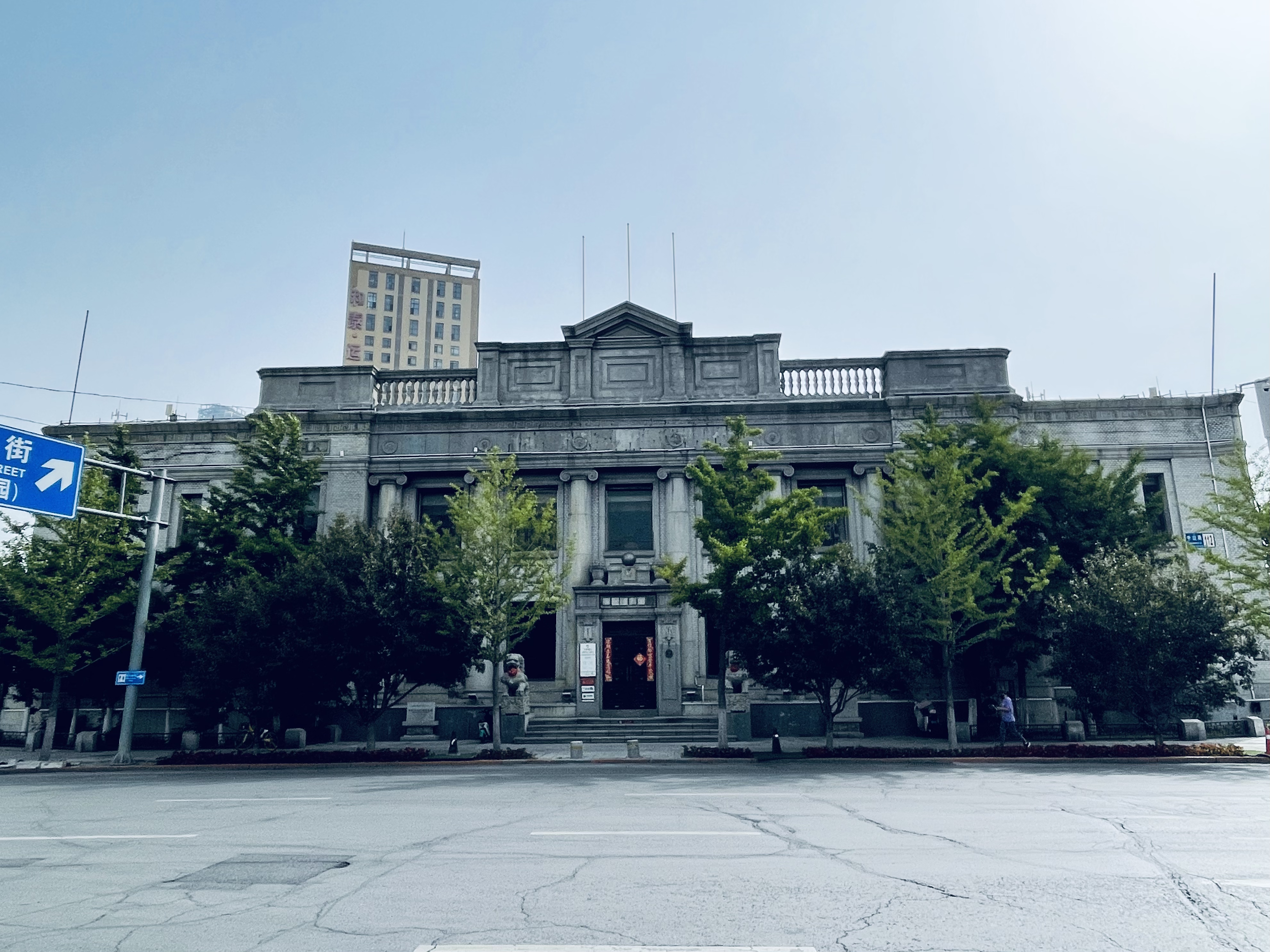
The same building in 2023

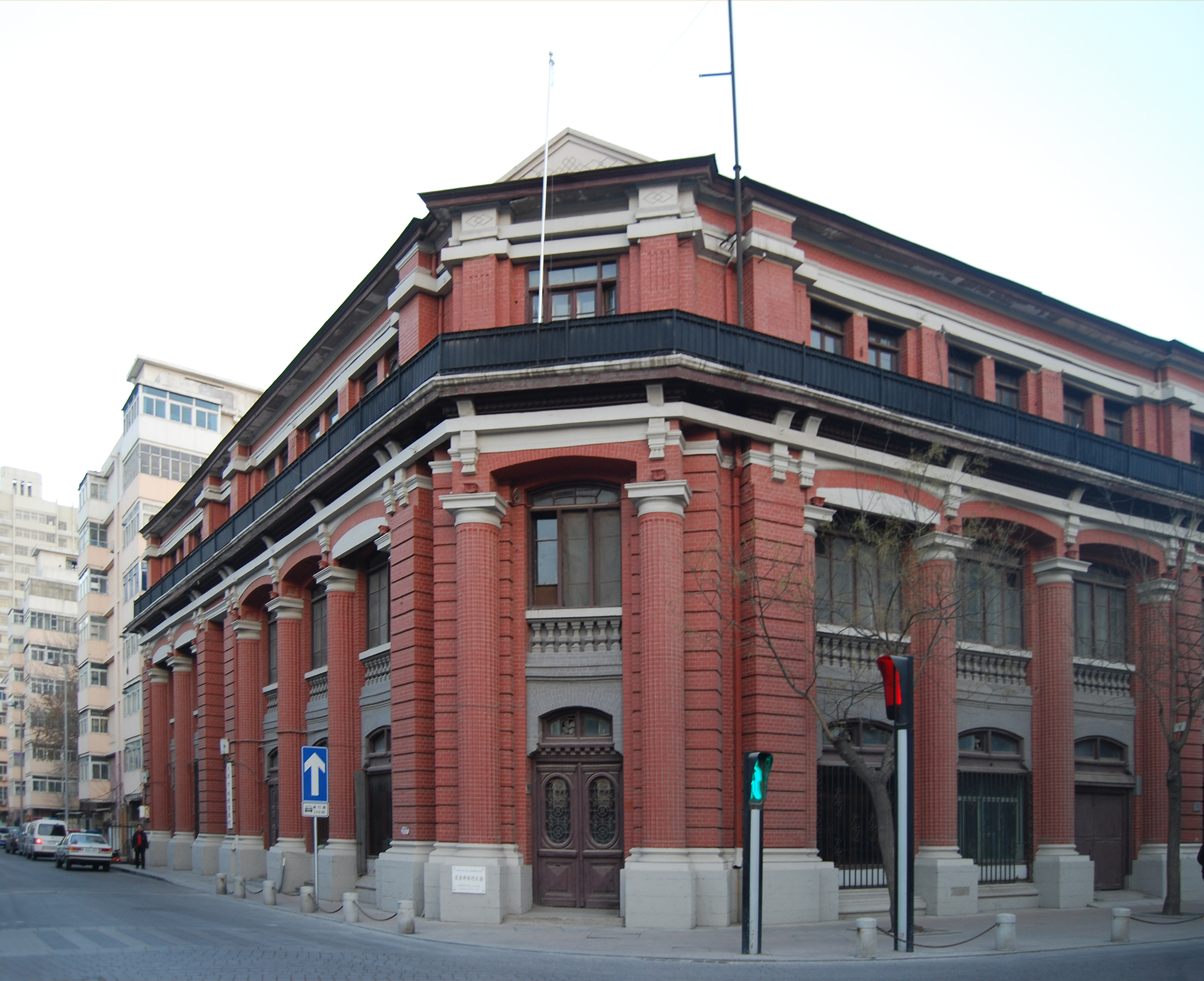
Former branch in Tianjin

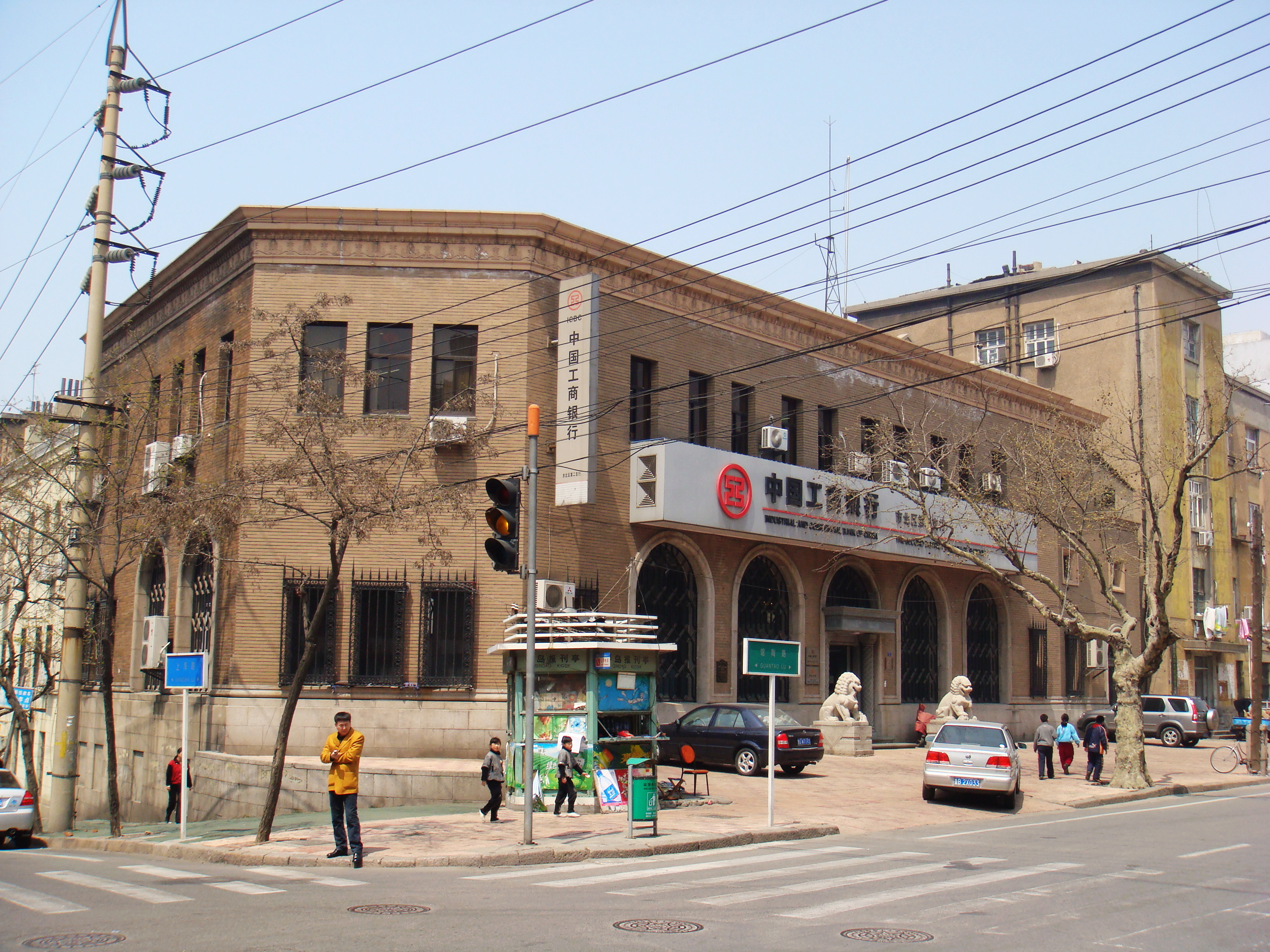
Former branch in Qingdao, built in 1930

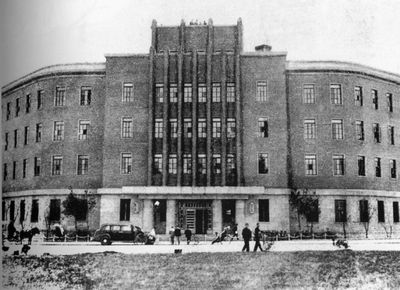
Manchurian Industrial Bank head office building in Changchun, photographed before 1945

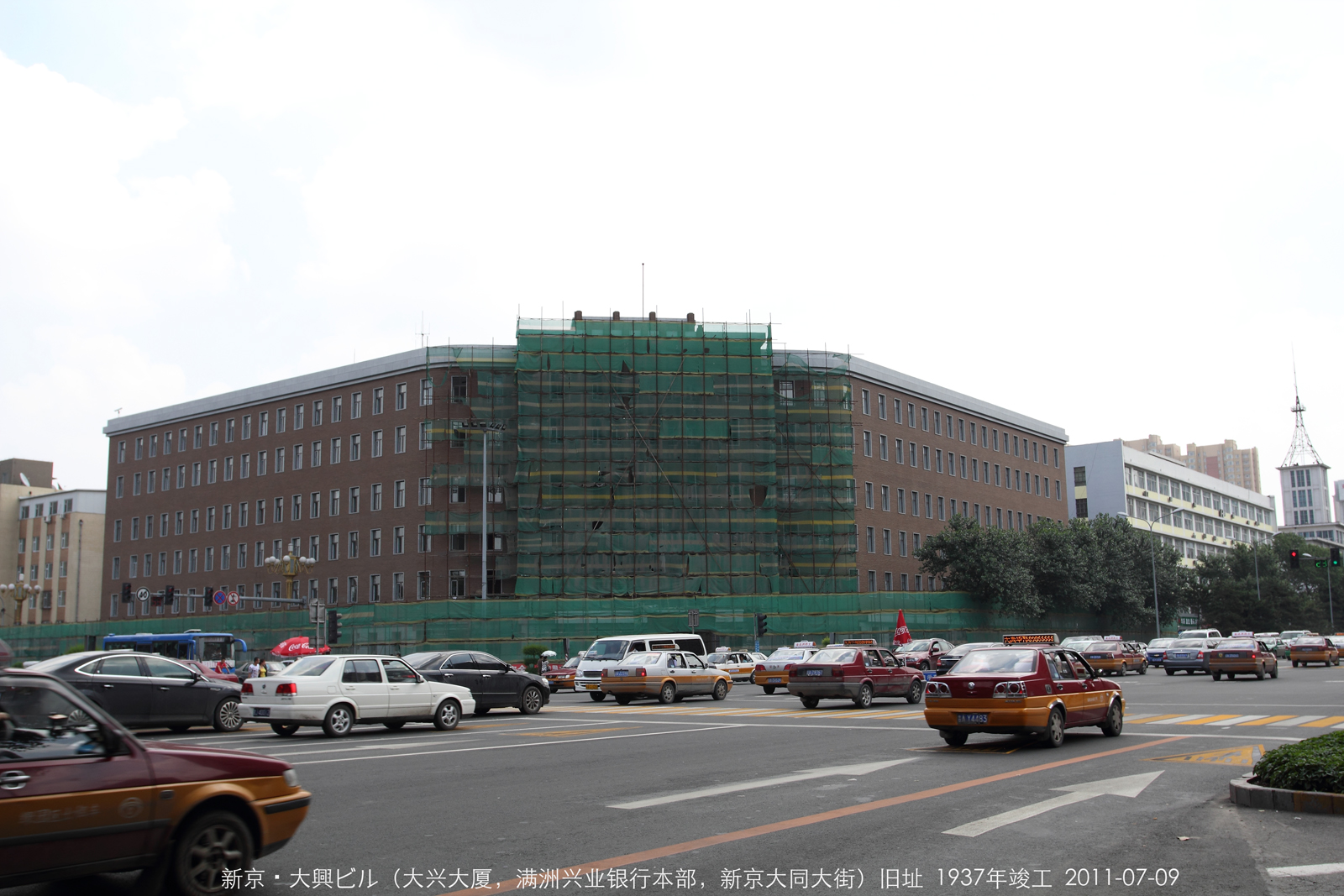
The same building under renovation in 2011

== Leadership ==
- Ichihara Morihiro, President from October 1909 to October 1915
- Shōda Kazue, President from December 1915 to October 1916
- Minobe Shunkichi, President from November 1916 to February 1924
- Nonaka Kiyoshi, President from February 1924 to July 1925
- Suzuki Shimakichi, President from July 1925 to December 1927
- Kato Keizaburo, President from December 1927 to December 1937
- Matsubara Junichi, President from December 1937 to December 1942
- Tanaka Tetsusaburō, President from December 1942 to September 1945
- U.S. Major B.D. Smith, President from September 1945 to June 1950

== See also ==
- Eighteenth Bank
- Chôsen Industrial Bank
- Korean Yen
- List of central banks
