= Yonggwang station (South Hamgyong) =

Railway station in North Korea

Yŏnggwang 영광

Korean name
- Hangul: 영광역
- Hanja: 栄光驛
- Revised Romanization: Yeonggwang-yeok
- McCune–Reischauer: Yŏnggwang-yŏk

General information
- Location: Yŏnggwang-ŭp, Yŏnggwang-gun, South Hamgyŏng; North Korea
- Coordinates: 40°1′21″N 127°27′42″E
- Owner: Korean State Railway
- Platforms: 2 (1 island, 1435 mm); 1 (762 mm)
- Tracks: 3 (1435 mm), 2 (762 mm), 6 (transloading yard)

History
- Opened: 10 June 1923
- Former names: Oro
- Original company: Sinhŭng Railway

Services
Preceding station	Korean State Railway	Following station
P'ungsang towards Sinhŭng	Sinhŭng Line (1435 mm)	Pumin towards Hamhŭng
Tongyang towards Sasu	Changjin Line	Terminus
Location

Yŏnggwang station is a railway station in Yŏnggwang-ŭp, Yŏnggwang county, South Hamgyŏng province, North Korea on the Sinhŭng Line of the Korean State Railway, and is the starting point of the narrow gauge Changjin Line. There are facilities for servicing the locomotives and rolling stock of the narrow gauge line here, as well as a six-track transloading yard between the standard and narrow gauge lines.

== History ==
The station, originally called Oro station, was opened on 10 June 1923 by the Sinhŭng Railway as part of the 17.0 km (10.6 mi) first section of its Hamnam Line between Hamhŭng and Yonggwang. The Sinhŭng Railway was bought and absorbed by the Chosen Railway on 22 April 1938. It received its current name after the establishment of the DPRK.
