= Songheung Line =

Railway line in colonial Korea

Overview
- Native name: 송흥선 (松興線)
- Status: Operational (see text)
- Owner: Sinheung Railway (1928–1938); Chōsen Railway (1938–1945)
- Locale: South Hamgyeong
- Termini: Hamnam Sinheung; Bujeonhoban
- Stations: 13

Service
- Type: Heavy rail, Regional rail Passenger/Freight
- Operator(s): Sinheung Railway; Chōsen Railway

History
- Opened: 1928–1932

Technical
- Line length: 50.6 km (31.4 mi)
- Number of tracks: Single track
- Track gauge: 762 mm (2 ft 6 in)

The Songheung Line (松興線, Shōkō-sen) was a 762 mm (30.0 in) narrow gauge railway line of the Chōsen Railway (Chōtetsu) of colonial-era Korea, located in South Hamgyeong Province. There was a 550 m (1,800 ft) cable-hauled section between Baekamsan and Hamnam Songheung.

== History ==
On 1 February 1928, the Chōsen Railway extended its Hamnam Line by opening a 20.0 km (12.4 mi) section from Pungsang to Hamnam Songheung. Two years later, on 1 February 1930 the Hamnam Line was taken over by a newly established subsidiary company, the Sinheung Railway, and on 15 January 1932, after the existing Hamnam Songheung Station was renamed Hasonghung Station, the present Hamnam Songheung Station was opened 1.0 km (0.62 mi) from Hasongheung, and on 10 September 1933, the line was extended 31.6 km (19.6 mi) to Bujeonhoban.

The Sinheung Railway was absorbed by Chōtetsu on 22 April 1938, and Chōtetsu separated the Hamnam Sinheung–Bujeonhoban section from the Hamnam Line, naming that portion the Songheung Line.

After the establishment of North Korea and the nationalisation of its railways, the Hamnam Line was split up, with the Hamheung - Oro - Sinheung section being merged with the Songheung Line to create the present Sinheung Line.

== Services ==
In the November 1942 timetable, the last issued prior to the start of the Pacific War, Chōtetsu operated the following schedule of third-class-only local passenger services:

Distance (read down)	Price Korean yen	545	501	503	505	507	Station name	Distance (read up)	Price Korean yen	500	502	504	506	546
Arr. from		-	Oro	Hamheung	Hamheung	Hamheung		Cont. to		Oro	Hamheung	Hamheung	Hamheung	-
41.0	1.65	...	06:56	09:55	14:14	19:09	Hamnam Sinheung	50.6	2.10	07:45	10:50	15:15	19:55	...
61.0	2.45	...	08:36	12:00	16:08	20:57	Hamnam Songheung	30.6	1.25	06:30	09:30	13:50	18:47	...
68.1	3.35	...	...	13:18	17:45	...	Bujeollyeong	23.5	1.00	...	...	10:40	17:28	...
74.7	3.60	07:12	...	14:00	18:30	...	Hamjiwon	16.9	0.70	...	...	10:07	16:54	21:01
91.6	4.25	08:17	...	15:07	19:39	...	Bujeonhoban	0.0	-	...	...	08:37	15:24	20:00

== Route ==
松興線 - 송흥선 - Shōkō Line - Songheung Line
Distance		Station name				
Total; km	S2S; km	Transcribed, Korean	Transcribed, Japanese	Hunminjeongeum	Hanja/Kanji	Connections
0.0	0.0	Hamnam Sinheung	Kannan-Shinkō	함남신흥	咸南新興	Hamnam Line
2.8	2.8	Gilbong	Kippō	길봉	吉峰	
6.9	4.1	Dongheung	Tōkō	동흥	東興	
13.1	6.2	Gyeongheung	Keikō	경흥	慶興	
14.9	1.8	Songha	Shōka	송하	松下	
19.0	4.1	Hasongheung	Kashōkō	하송흥	下松興	
20.0	1.0	Hamnam Songheung	Kan'nan Shōkō	함남송흥	咸南松興	
25.4	5.4	Baekamsan	Hakuganzan	백암산	白岩山	
27.1	1.7	Bujeollyeong	Fusenrei	부전령	赴戦嶺	
33.7	6.6	Hamjiwon	Kanchiin	함지원	咸地院	
40.0	3.8	Bujeon	Fusen	부전	赴戦	
47.9	7.9	Hamnam Toan	Kan'nan Dōan	함남도안	咸南道安	
50.6	2.7	Bujeonhoban	Fusenkohan	부전호반	赴戦湖畔	
