= Sasu station =

Railway station in North Korea

Sasu 사수

Korean name
- Hangul: 사수역
- Hanja: 泗水驛
- Revised Romanization: Sasu-yeok
- McCune–Reischauer: Sasu-yŏk

General information
- Location: Yangji-rodongjagu, Changjin-gun, South Hamgyŏng; North Korea
- Coordinates: 40.4167°N 127.2607°E
- Owner: Korean State Railway
- Platforms: 2 (1 island)
- Tracks: 3

History
- Opened: 1 November 1934
- Original company: Sinhŭng Railway

Services
Preceding station	Korean State Railway	Following station
Terminus	Changjin Line	Changjin towards Yŏnggwang
Location

Sasu station is a railway station in Yangji-rodongjagu, Changjin County, South Hamgyŏng province, North Korea, the northern terminus of the Changjin Line of the Korean State Railway.

== History ==
The station was opened on 1 November 1934 by the Sinhŭng Railway as part of the second section of its Changjin Line between Samgŏ and Kujin. Sasu became the terminus of the line after the closure of the Sindae–Kujin and Sasu–Sindae sections on 15 July and 30 August 1935 respectively. The Sinhŭng Railway was bought and absorbed by the Chosen Railway on 22 April 1938.
