= Guizhou WZ-7 Soaring Dragon =

Chinese aerial reconnaissance UAV

WZ-7 Soaring Dragon
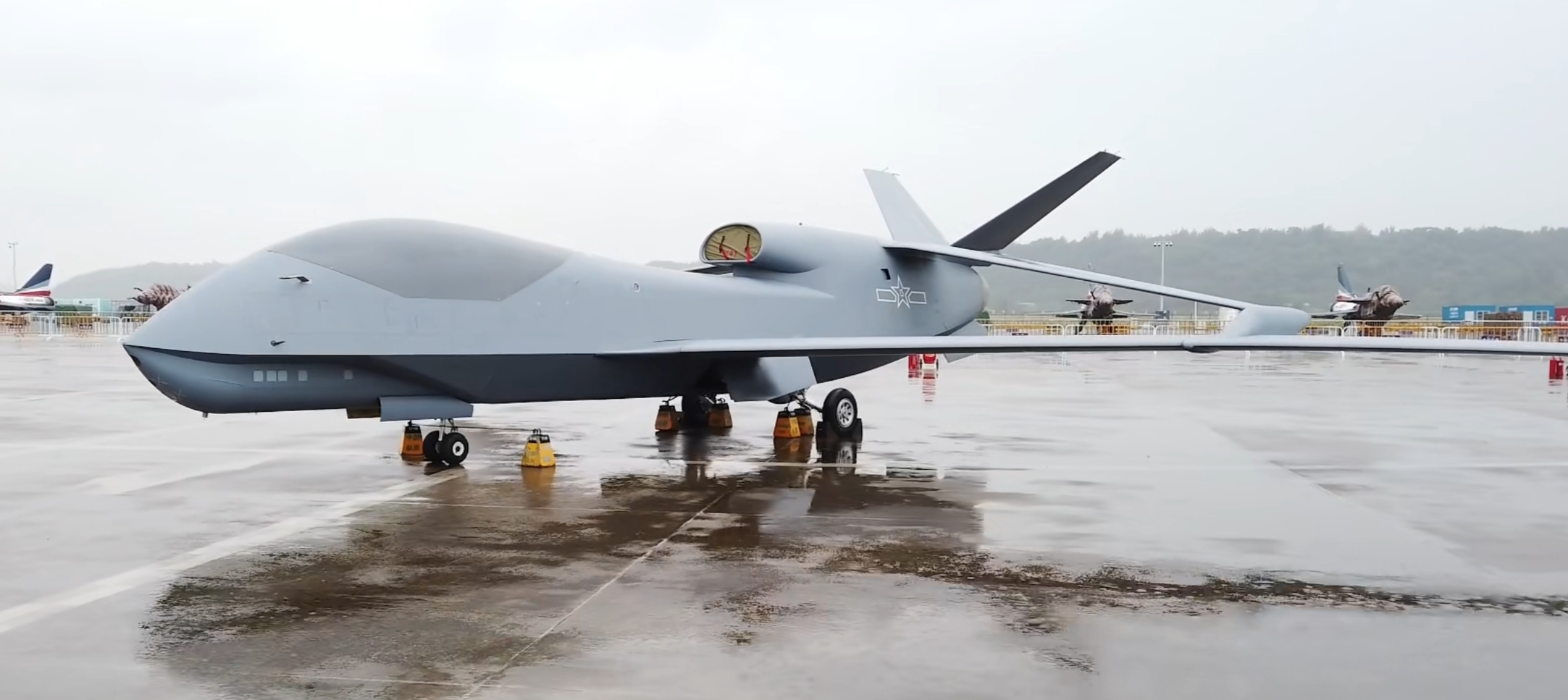
- WZ-7 at Airshow China Zhuhai 2022

General information
- Type: Unmanned maritime surveillance and patrol aircraft
- National origin: People's Republic of China
- Manufacturer: Guizhou Aircraft Industry Corporation
- Designer: Chengdu Aircraft Industry Group
- Status: In production
- Primary users: People's Liberation Army Air Force People's Liberation Army Navy
- Number built: Classified

History
- Manufactured: 2015/2016 - ?
- Introduction date: 2018

The Guizhou WZ-7 Soaring Dragon (Chinese: 无侦-7 翔龙; pinyin: Wú zhēn-qī Xiáng Lóng) is a high-altitude long endurance unmanned aerial vehicle (UAV) from the People's Republic of China. The aircraft features a unique joined-wing design.

The primary mission is expected to be aerial reconnaissance, but it may also be fitted to provide targeting data for anti-ship ballistic missiles and cruise missiles.

== Development ==
The WZ-7 was designed by the Chengdu Aircraft Industry Group and constructed by the Guizhou Aircraft Industry Corporation. A model appeared at the 2006 China International Aviation & Aerospace Exhibition. The first flight has not occurred as of 2011. The drone conducted radar cross-section testing. The WZ-7 entered serial production in 2015 to 2016. A complete redesign of WZ-7 was observed in 2020 with the Chinese Air Force roundel. The redesign featured V-tails, a different engine nozzle with the WS-13 turbofan engine, and changes to the ventral fin and the sail structure. The WZ-7 UAV was officially unveiled by the military at the Zhuhai Airshow in 2021. It was displayed again in 2022.

== Design ==
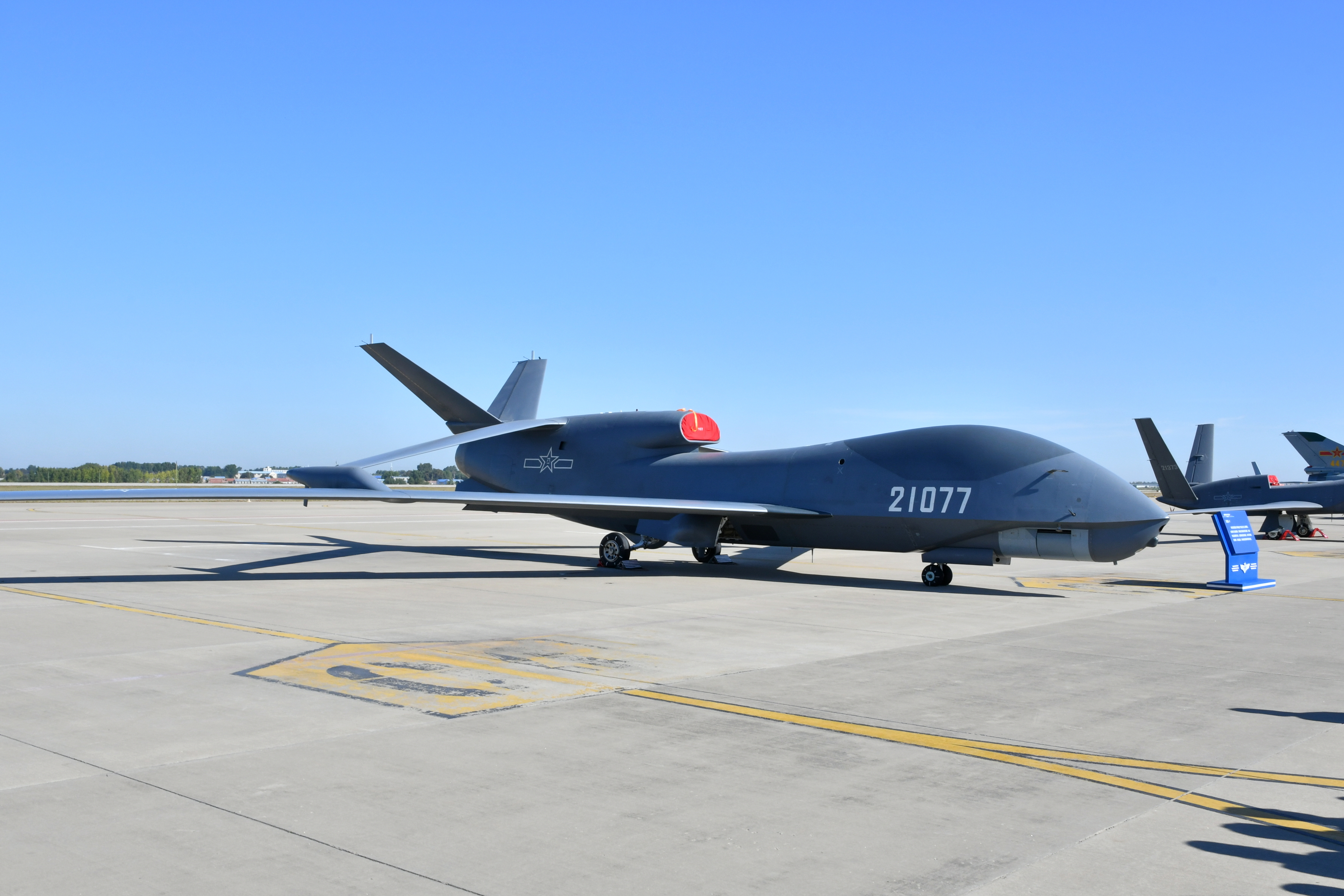
WZ-7 drone of the PLA Air Force

Larger than most UAVs, the WZ-7 features a tandem, joined-wing design, which allows for a more rigid, less flexible wing than other configurations, with benefits said to include an increased lift-to-drag ratio and less complex flight controls than a HALE UAV with a conventional wing. The air intake for the engine is mounted atop the fuselage, with the engine itself mounted in the rear of the aircraft. The prototype aircraft is powered by a Guizhou WP-13 turbojet engine, a copy of the Soviet Tumansky R-13; it is anticipated that an improved engine will be installed in production aircraft.

The operational WZ-7 has a significantly modified shape. The single vertical tail on the prototype was changed to a pair of canted tails. A turbofan engine was installed on the production model. Due to the different engine and aerodynamics, the endurance of the production model is unknown. The aircraft could cruise significantly longer than the 10 hours advertised for the prototype.

== Operational history ==
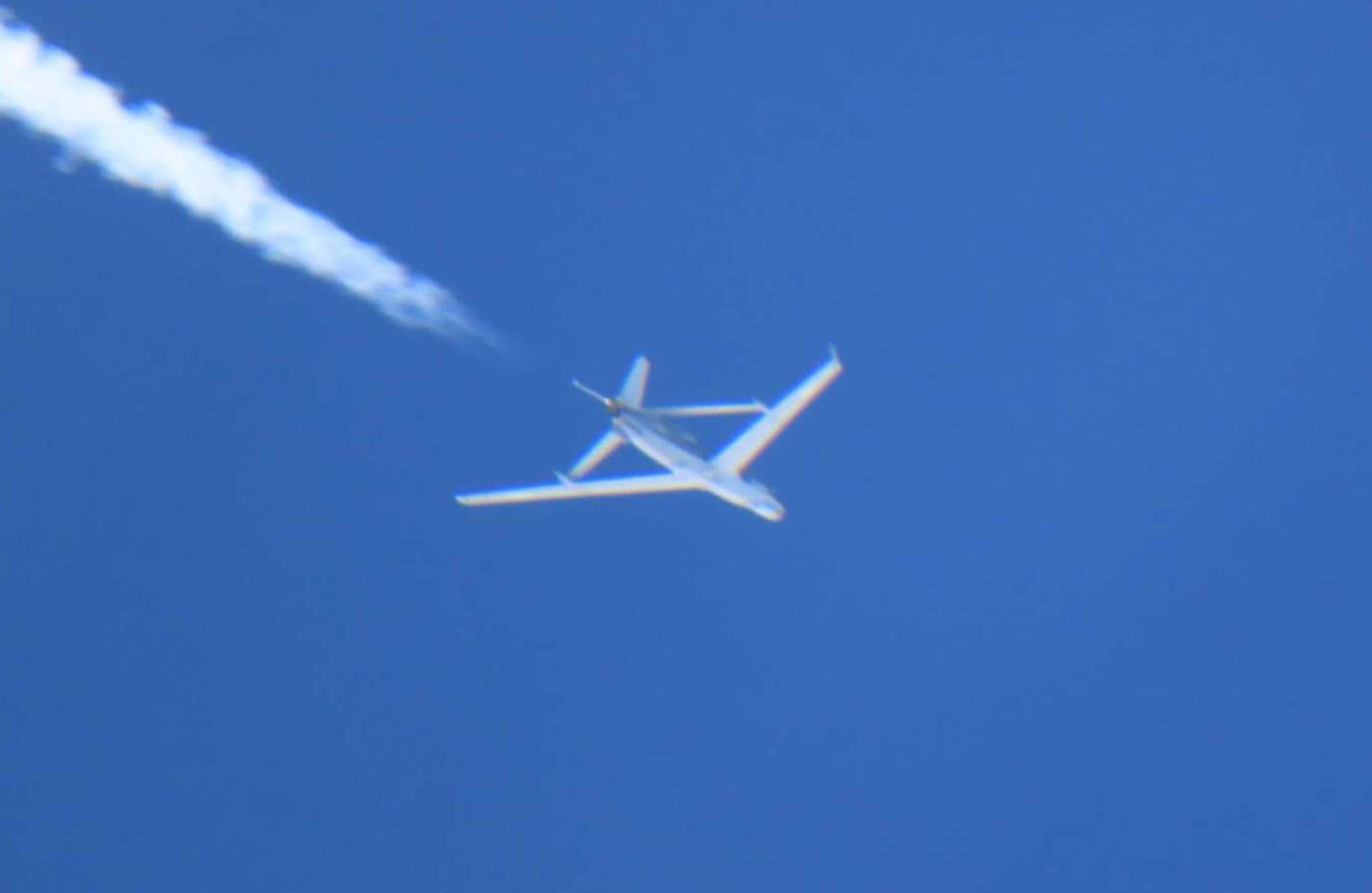
WZ-7 flying above the Pacific Ocean

The WZ-7 entered service with the People's Liberation Army Air Force in 2018 and a number were deployed to the Tibet Autonomous Region, Hainan Island, and Yishuntun Airbase near North Korea.

On 24 July 2019, a WZ-7 shadowed the American Ticonderoga-class cruiser USS Antietam as she transited the Taiwan Strait.

On 15 December 2022, it was reported that China had allegedly deployed WZ-7 UAVs near the Indian border in Tibet.

On 26 March 2024, a China People's Liberation Army (PLA) WZ-7 high-altitude long-endurance unmanned aerial vehicle (UAV) undertook flight maneuvers over the Sea of Japan.

Based on satellite images, the WZ-7 likely began its deployment over the South China Sea in 2022. On 18 April 2024, the WZ-7 was observed flying over the West Philippine Sea, the southeast section of the South China Sea. The drone was likely monitoring the deployment of the Typhon missile launcher by the United States on Luzon.

== Operators ==
China

- People's Liberation Army Air Force: 12 units as of 2022
- People's Liberation Army Naval Air Force: 8 units as of 2018

== Specifications (Soaring Dragon prototype) ==
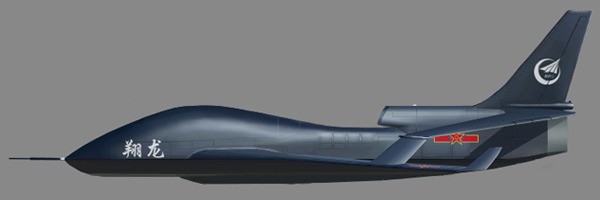
Artist's impression of the WZ-7 prototype

Data from AirForces Monthly

General characteristics

- Crew: None
- Length: 14.33 m (47 ft 0 in)
- Wingspan: 24.86 m (81 ft 7 in)
- Height: 5.41 m (17 ft 9 in)
- Powerplant: 1 × Guizhou WP-13 turbojet or unknown type of turbofan, 43.1 kN (9,700 lbf) thrust

Performance

- Cruise speed: 750 km/h (466 mph, 405 kn)
- Range: 7,000 km (4,300 mi, 3,800 nmi)
- Combat range: 2,000 km (1,200 mi, 1,100 nmi)
- Endurance: 10 hours (at maximum speed; with turbojet)
- Service ceiling: 18,000 m (59,000 ft)

== See also ==
- Chengdu WZ-10

Aircraft of comparable role, configuration, and era

- BAE Systems Mantis
- General Atomics MQ-20 Avenger
- Northrop Grumman RQ-4 Global Hawk

Related lists

- List of unmanned aerial vehicles of China
- List of active People's Liberation Army aircraft
