= Yishuntun Airbase =

Coordinates: 43.5876°N 123.5792°E

Yishuntun Airbase (alternatively Zhengjiatun) is a military air base located in Jilin, Northeast China. The airbase is a highly strategic location, being part of the Northern Theater Command, near the North Korean border.

== History ==
Yishtuntun began undergoing an expansion in 2016, with one runway lengthened to 2,800 meters. Nearby troop garrison and rail connections were also expanded.

== Operations ==
Yishtun became the third Chinese base to operate the Guizhou Soar Dragon.
