= Korean yen =

Currency of Japanese Korea (1910–1945)

조선 엔 (Korean)
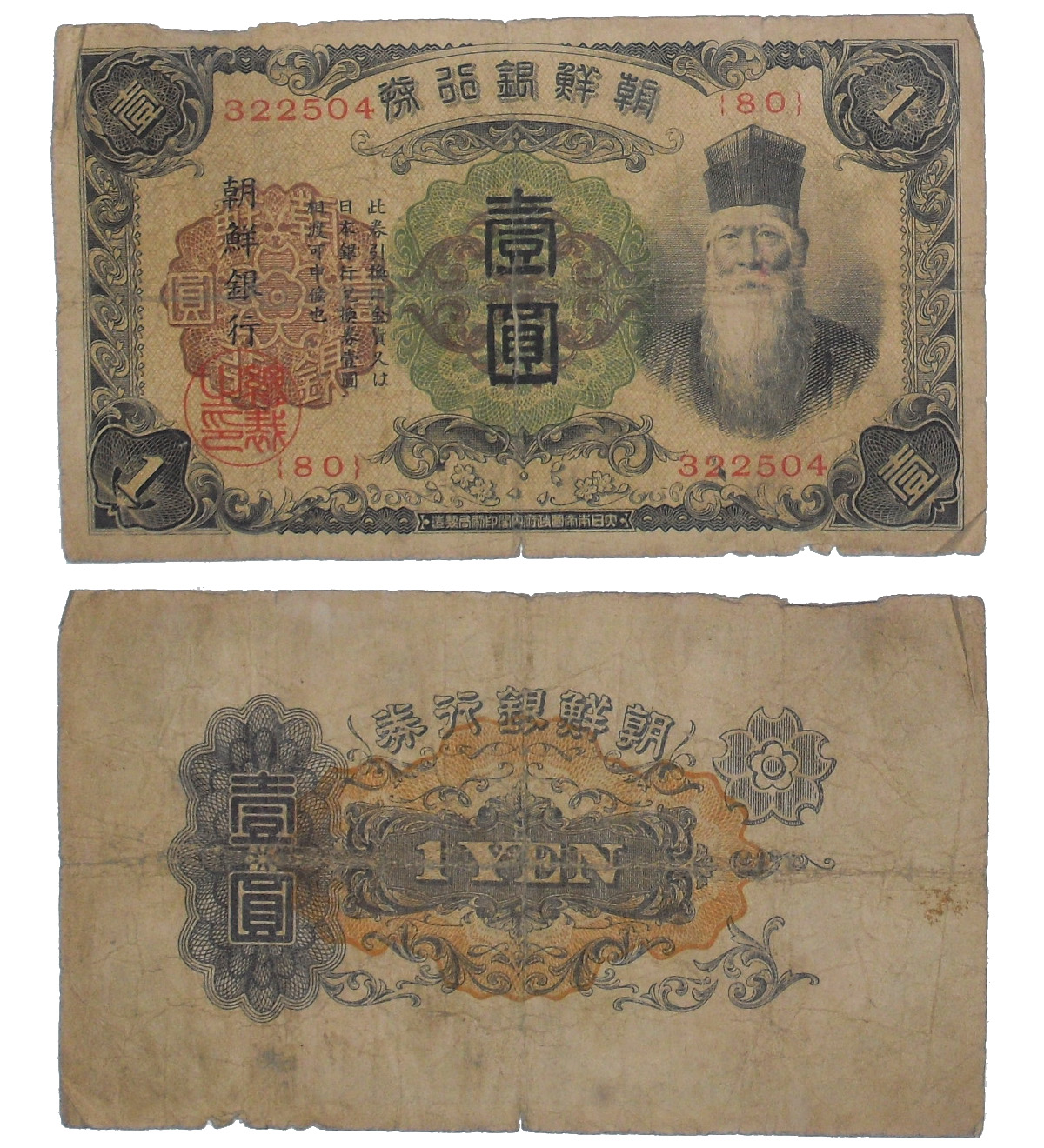
- Korean one yen note (1932)

Units of account
- Symbol: 圓
- Subunit
- 1/100: Sen
- 1/1000: Rin
- 1/10000: Mō

Denominations
- Banknotes: 10 sen, 20 sen, 50 sen 圓1, 圓5, 圓10, 圓100
- Coins: None

Demographics
- User(s): Japanese Korea

Issuance
- Central bank: Bank of Chōsen
- This infobox shows the latest status before this currency was rendered obsolete.

- Korean yen
- Hunminjeongeum: 엔
- Hanja: 圓
- Revised Romanization: won
- McCune–Reischauer: wŏn
- IPA: [wʌ̹n]

The yen was the currency of Japanese Korea from 1910 to 1945. It was pegged to the Japanese yen at par and consisted of Japanese currency and banknotes issued specifically for Korea. The yen was subdivided into 100 sen. It replaced the Korean won at par and was replaced by the South Korean won and the North Korean won at par.

== Banknotes ==
From 1902 to 1910, banknotes were issued by Dai-Ichi Bank. Denominations included 10 sen, 20 sen, 50 sen, 1 yen, 5 yen, and 10 yen. The sen notes were vertical and resembled the Japanese sen notes of 1872 and the Japanese military yen at the turn of the century. These notes were redeemable in "Japanese Currency at any of its Branches in Korea".

In 1909, the Bank of Korea (韓國銀行) was founded in Seoul as a central bank and began issuing currency of modern type. Following the establishment of the Bank of Korea, it would immediately begin to issue its own banknotes, these new banknotes were redeemable "in gold or Nippon Ginko notes." Most of the reserves held by the Bank of Korea at the time were banknotes issued by the Bank of Japan and commercial paper.

The banknotes issued by the Bank of Korea were only very slightly modified from the earlier Dai-Ichi Bank banknotes that had circulated in Korea, this was done to reduce any possible confusion during the transition period. The name of the Bank of Korea was inserted and the royal plum crest of Korea replaced Dai-Ichi Bank's 10-pointed star emblem, and the reverse sides of the 1 yen banknotes changed colour, but all the overall the changes were minute.

Bank of Korea notes were dated 1909 and issued in 1910 and 1911. After Korea lost sovereignty to Japan in 1910, the Bank of Korea was renamed the Bank of Chōsen (朝鮮銀行, Korean: Joseon Eunhaeng, Japanese: Chōsen Ginkō). The first Bank of Chosen note was dated 1911 and issued in 1914. 1 yen, 5 yen, 10 yen, and 100 yen were issued regularly, while there were occasionally some sen notes (5, 10, 20, 50 sen). 1000 yen was printed but never issued at the end of World War II. The earlier issues were redeemable "in Gold or Nippon Ginko Note". A similar phrase was written in Japanese on later issues. The image of an old man on the currency is probably an allegorical representation of longevity possibly based on Kim Yun-sik

== Sen ==
=== 1916 ===
Denomination	Front	Reverse	Obverse motif	Reverse motif
5 sen (Stamp currency)			—N/a	—N/a
10 sen				Ornamental
20 sen				
50 sen				

=== 1919 ===
Denomination	Front	Reverse	Obverse motif	Reverse motif
10 sen				
20 sen				
50 sen				

=== 1937 ===
Denomination	Front	Reverse	Obverse motif	Reverse motif
10 sen				
50 sen				

== Yen ==
=== 1911 ===
Denomination	Front	Reverse	Obverse motif	Reverse motif
1 yen (Gold certificate)			Jurōjin	
5 yen (Gold certificate)			Jurōjin	
10 yen (Gold certificate)			Jurōjin	
100 yen (Gold certificate)			Daikokuten	

=== 1932 ===
Denomination	Front	Reverse	Obverse motif	Reverse motif
1 yen			Jurōjin	
5 yen			Jurōjin	
10 yen			Jurōjin	

=== 1938 ===
Denomination	Front	Reverse	Obverse motif	Reverse motif
100 yen			Jurōjin	

=== 1944 ===
Denomination	Front	Reverse	Obverse motif	Reverse motif
1 yen			Jurōjin	
5 yen			Jurōjin	
10 yen			Jurōjin	
100 yen			Jurōjin	

=== 1945 ===
Denomination	Front	Reverse	Obverse motif	Reverse motif
1 yen			Jurōjin	
5 yen			Jurōjin	
100 yen			Jurōjin	
1000 yen (Never released)		—N/a	Jurōjin	

== See also ==
- Bank of Chōsen

Preceded by: Korean yang Reason: heavier influence by Japan; Ratio: 1 yen = 5 yang	Currency of Korea of Empire of Japan; 1902 – 1945; Concurrent with: Korean won until 1910, when Japan completely annexed Korea	Succeeded by: North Korean (old) won Reason: end of World War II and Division of Korea
Preceded by: Korean yang Reason: heavier influence by Japan; Ratio: 1 yen = 5 yang	Currency of Korea of Empire of Japan; 1902 – 1945; Concurrent with: Korean won until 1910, when Japan completely annexed Korea	Succeeded by: South Korean (old) won Reason: end of World War II and Division of Korea; Ratio: at par
