= Sinheung Railway =

1930–1938 company in colonial Korea

Sinheung Railway Co. Ltd.

Overview
- Native name: 신흥철도주식회사 (Sinheung Cheoldo Jusikhoesa) 新興鉄道株式会社 (Shinkō Tetsudo Kabushiki Kaisha)

The Sinheung Railway (Japanese: 新興鉄道株式会社, Shinkō Tetsudo Kabushiki Kaisha; Korean: 신흥철도주식회사, Sinheung Cheoldo Jusikhoesa), was a privately owned railway company in colonial era Korea.

It was a subsidiary of the Chōsen Railway (Chōtetsu), colonial Korea's largest privately owned railway company, established in 1930 to operate a number of lines opened by Chōtetsu and one of its predecessors, the Chōsen Forestry Railway.

Section	Opening date	Length	Line	Opened by	Notes
Hamheung - Oro	7 June 1923	17.0 km (10.6 mi)	Hamnam Line	Chōsen Forestry Railway	
Oro - Jangpung	25 August 1923	11.2 km (7.0 mi)	Hamnam Line	Chōsen Forestry Railway	Pungsang—Jangpung section subsequently closed.
West Hamhŭng Station	25 August 1923	-	Chōsen Forestry Railway	Hamnam Line	
Oro - Sangtong	1 October 1926	15.1 km (9.4 mi)	Chōsen Railway	Hamnam Line	
Pungsang - Hasongheung	1 February 1928	20.0 km (12.4 mi)	Chōsen Railway	Songheung Line	
Hasongheung – Hamnam Songheung	15 January 1932	1.0 km (0.62 mi)	Sinheung Railway	Songheung Line	
Hamnam Songheung - Bujeonhoban	10 September 1933	31.6 km (19.6 mi)	Sinheung Railway	Songheung Line	
Sangtong - Samgeo	1 September 1934	15.1 km (9.4 mi)	Sinheung Railway	Jangjin Line	
Samgeo - Gujin	1 November 1934	46.7 km (29.0 mi)	Sinheung Railway	Jangjin Line	
West Hamheung - Cheongiri	11 May 1934	14.9 km (9.3 mi)	Sinheung Railway	Namheung Line	
Cheongiri - Naeho	5 March 1936	1.7 km (1.1 mi)	Sinheung Railway	Namheung Line	
Naeho - Seohojin	15 December 1936	1.7 km (1.1 mi)	Sinheung Railway	Namheung Line	

The Sinheung Railway was bought and absorbed by Chōtetsu on 22 April 1938; Chōtetsu subsequently split the Sinheung Railway's network into four separate lines: the Hamnam Line (Hamheung–Hamnam Sinhung/Sangtong/Jangpung), the Songheung Line (Hamnam Sinheung–Bujeonhoban), the Jangjin Line (Sangtong–Sasu), and the Namheung Line (West Hamheung–Seohojin).
