= Yonggwang station =

Pyongyang Metro station

Yŏnggwang 영광
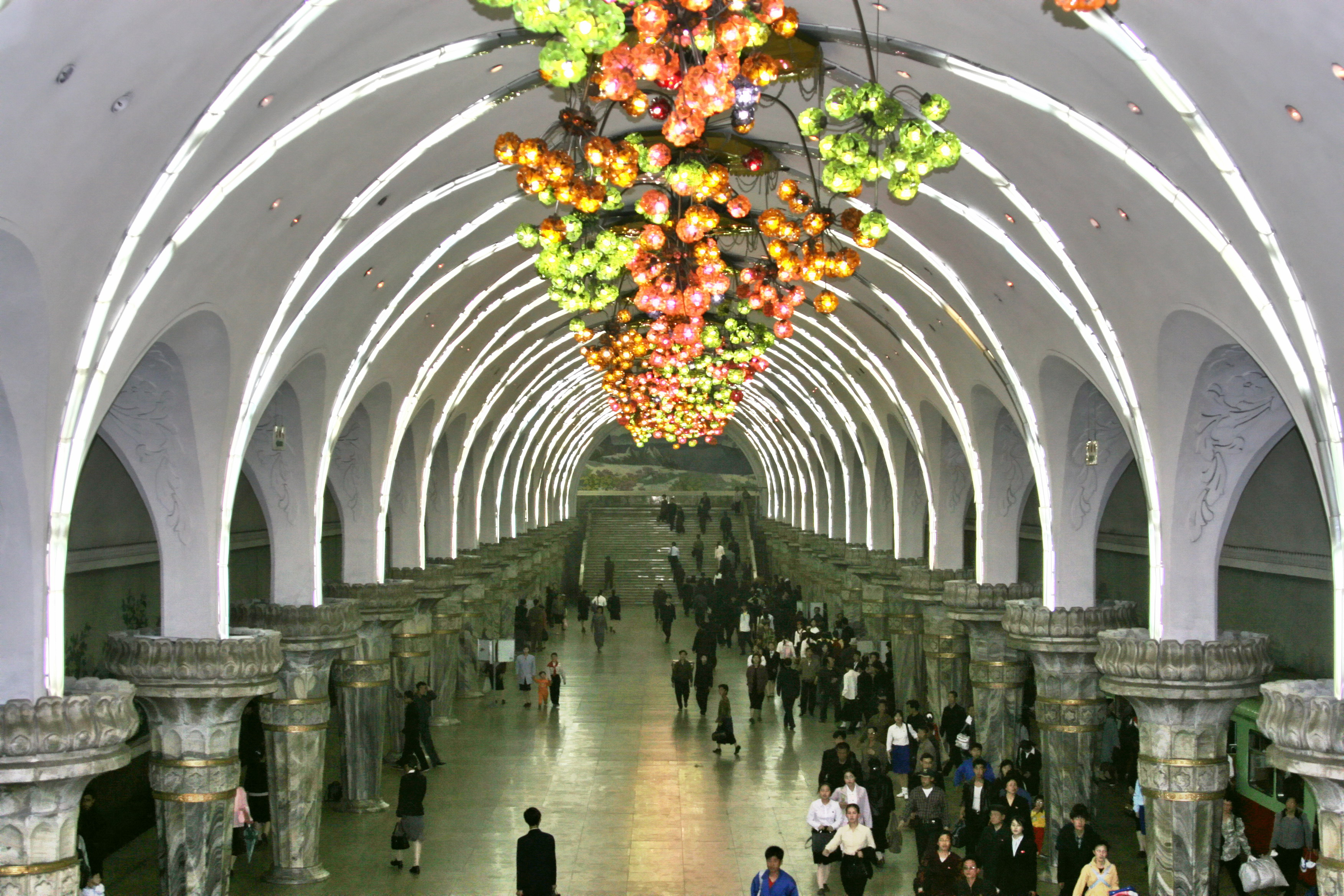
- View of the station's island platform, prior to its 2025 renovation

Korean name
- Hangul: 영광역
- Hanja: 榮光驛
- Revised Romanization: Yeonggwang-yeok
- McCune–Reischauer: Yŏnggwang-yŏk

General information
- Location: Sosong Street and Changgwang Street, Chung-guyok, Pyongyang; Democratic People's Republic of Korea
- Coordinates: 39°0′34.78″N 125°43′56.35″E
- Owner: Pyongyang Metro
- Operator: Pyongyang Metro
- Platforms: 2 (1 island platform)
- Tracks: 2
- Connections: Pyongyang Station; Pyongyang Tram Line 1

Construction
- Structure type: Underground
- Parking: Yes (Pyongyang station)
- Cycle facilities: None
- Accessible: No

History
- Opened: 4 April 1987

Services
Preceding station	Pyongyang Metro	Following station
Puhung Terminus	Chollima Line	Ponghwa towards Pulgunbyol
Location

Yŏnggwang station is a metro station of the Pyongyang Metro. The station was built as part of the Mangyongdae Line, designed as an extension of the Chollima Line that opened on or about 10 April 1987, and is today served by Chollima Line trains.

Before the rules were relaxed in 2010, it was one of the only two stations that tourists could visit, the other one being Puhŭng station, because these two stations are the most finely decorated in the system. They were also the last two to be completed. The station features murals on either side of the tunnel, 80 metres (260 ft) long each. A third mosaic mural is called Lake Chon on Mt. Paektu.

Yonggwang station received a major renovation in 2025, as reported by CNA on 25 August.

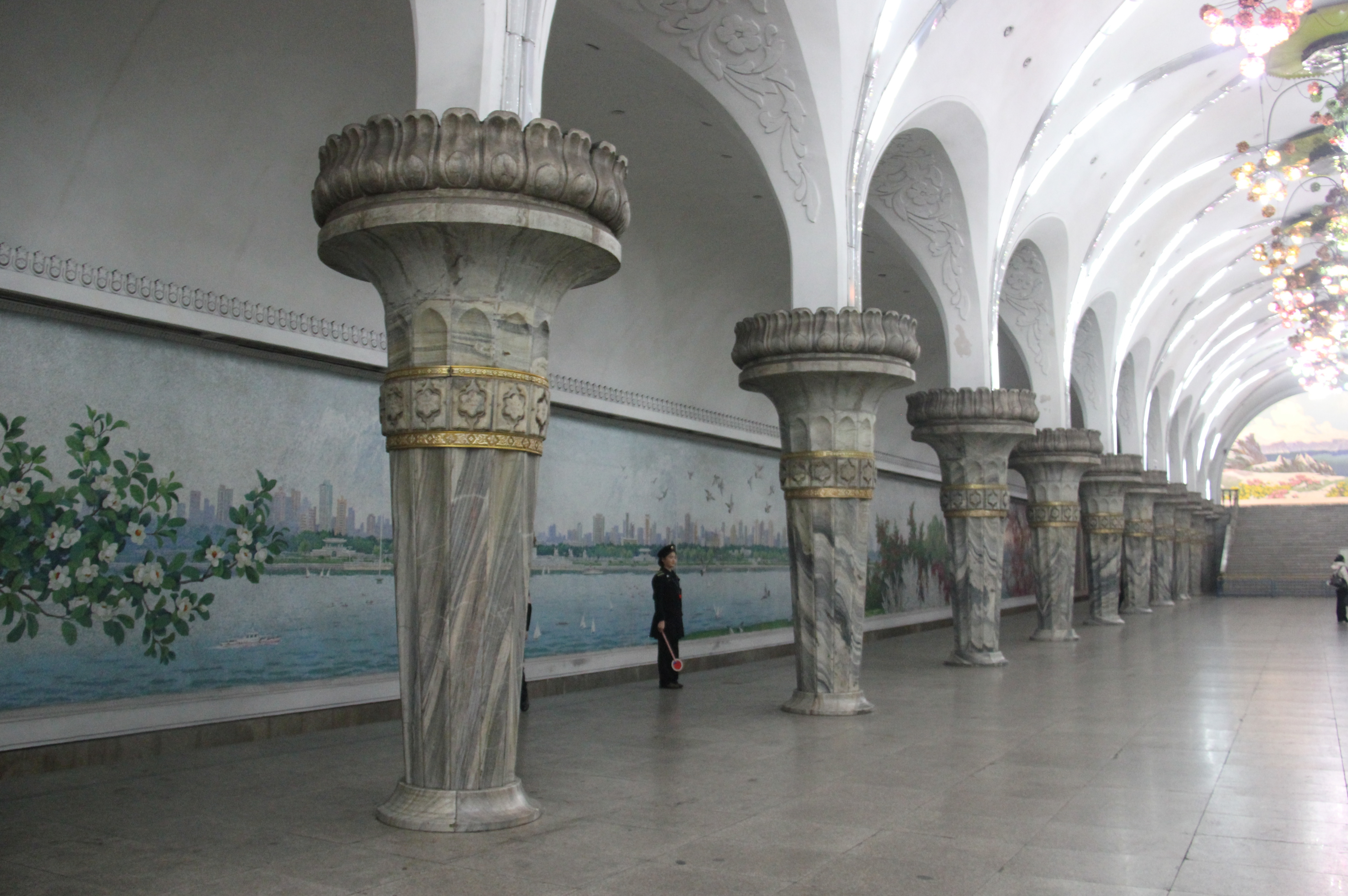
Murals on the walls of the tunnel

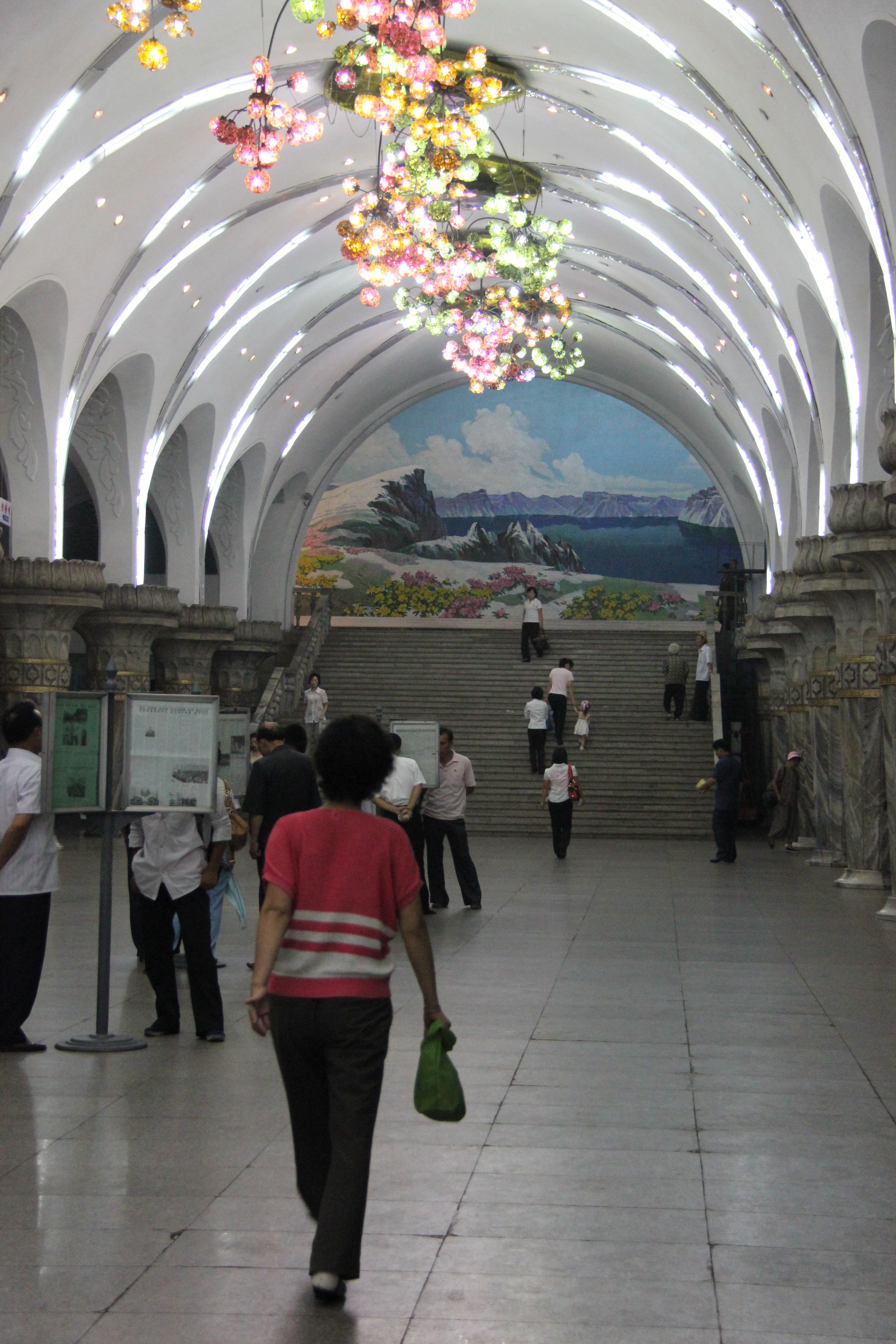
The mural Lake Chon on Mt. Paektu

== Connections ==
The station is located near P'yŏngyang station of the Korean State Railway, with connections to long-distance trains on the P'yŏngnam, P'yŏngra, and P'yŏngŭi Lines.
