= Hallym University =

South Korea University

Coordinates: 37°53′10″N 127°44′19″E

- 한림대학교
- Motto: The University that Cares
- Type: Private
- Established: 1982
- President: Choi Yanghee
- Location: Chuncheon, South Korea
- Website: Hallym University

Hallym University (Korean: 한림대학교) is a private university located in Chuncheon, Gangwon, Republic of Korea. Hallym University was established in 1982. In 1995 it was designated by the Ministry of Education as one of a handful of universities entitled to receive the financial support of the Ministry for their specialization programs. After that, it continued to be so designated consecutively for five years. In addition, it has acquired the status of "distinguished university," the title granted by the Ministry of Education, three years in a row, and has also been selected for funding by the Brain Korea 21 Project.

== History ==
- 1982 Dr. Yoon Duck-Sun, the Chairman of the Il-Song Education Foundation, founds Hallym University. Dr. Kim Taek-Il begins his service as first president. A total of 228 students are enrolled in four departments: English, Social Work, Biology, and Medicine.
- 1984 The Schools of Humanities, Social Sciences, Natural Sciences, and Medicine plus the Liberal Education Department are established. Chuncheon Sacred Heart Hospital, one of five hospitals affiliated with the university, opens.
- 1986 Dr. Hyun Seung-Jong is installed as second president.
- 1987 Graduate programs for the master's degree are accredited.
- 1988 University reorganization authorized (College of Humanities, College of Social Sciences, College of Natural Sciences, College of Medicine. four colleges, two divisions).
- 1989 Start of full-scale operations at Hallym University. Inauguration of 1st president, Hyun Seung-Jong. Establishment of a Ph.D. program is authorized. Inauguration of the 2nd chairman of the foundation, Yoon Dae-Won.
- 1990 Establishment of Hallym Academy of Sciences.
- 1992 Inauguration of 2nd president, Chung Bum-Mo.
- 1994 Establishment of the Graduate School of Business authorized.
- 1995 Establishment of the Foreign Language Education Center. Establishment of the Center for Social Education.
- 1996 Inauguration of 3rd president, Lee Sang-Joo.
- 1998 Inauguration of 4th president, Han Dal-Sun.
- 2000 Opening of the Ilsong Arts Hall.
- 2001 Establishment of the Graduate School of Public Health.
- 2002 Establishment of the Industry-University Cooperation Center
- 2003 Inauguration of 5th president, Lee Sang-Woo. Establishment of the Center for Teaching & Learning. Hallym University is honored as a "Top 10" university in Korea by Joong-Ang Daily Newspaper. Hallym University proclaims University Identification.
- 2004 Hallym International School is established. Hallym International Dormitory is opened.
- 2005 Education Center for Aging Society is opened. Tae-gye building is opened.
- 2006 Il-song Memorial library is opened.
- 2007 Inauguration of 6th president, Choongsoo Kim.
- 2008 Inauguration of 7th president, Lee Youngsun.
- 2012 Inauguration of 8th president, Ro Kunil.

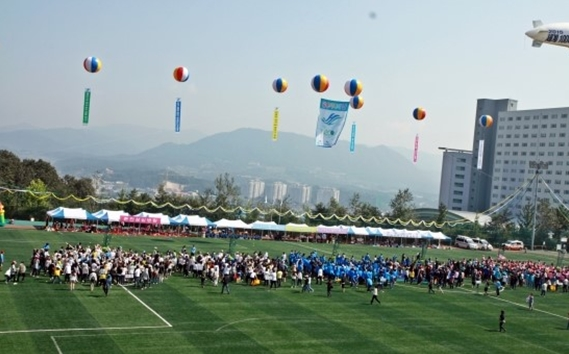
Dormitory

== Awards ==
- Honored as a Top 10 University in Korea by the Joong-Ang Daily Newspaper in 2003.
- Placed among Asia's Top 100 and Korea's Top 19 Universities by Cho-Sun Daily Newspaper & QS APPLE in 2009.
- Placed as Top 4 of Education Section and Top 1 of Communication Section in Korea by Kyung-Hyang Daily Newspaper in 2010.
- One university among "Advancement of College Education - Well Teaching Universities, Top 11" in Korea by Ministry of Education, Science and Technology in 2010.
- Placed as Top 4 of The Conditions of Education in Universities by the Joong-Ang Daily Newspaper in 2011.
- Placed as Korea's Top 19 and Asia's Top 100 Universities by Cho-Sun Daily Newspaper & QS APPLE in 2012.
- Selected as a university among "Dream Universities for the Young People" in Korea by Dong-A Daily Newspaper in 2013.

== International relations ==
The Hallym International Affairs Section mainly manages domestic and International agreements, and has a focus on globalization, in order to keep up with international trends. It supports foreign student affairs, regarding their admission and academic life.

Hallym University has concluded agreements with 85 universities in 23 countries to carry out academic exchanges of professors, students, and researchers.

== Academics ==
=== Colleges ===
In general curricula, the division offers composition, computer operations, English conversation, Chinese writing, and physical education to prepare for a global society. It also offers foreign language courses, as well as courses in arts education, teaching, and public service.

The division manages a composition-consulting office to develop writing ability. With two full-time professors, the office offers a writing consultation service for students via e-mail, web page, and interview.

==== Department ====
- College of Humanities: Departments of Korean Language and Literature, English Language and Literature, Philosophy, History, Chinese Studies, Japanese Studies, Russian Studies.
- College of Social Sciences: Departments of Communications, Psychology, Sociology, Social Welfare, Politics and Public Administration, Law and Public Administration.
- College of Business: Departments of Business, Finance, Economics.
- College of Natural Sciences: Departments of Mathematics and Information Sciences, Electronphysics, Chemistry, Life Science, Biomedical Science, Food Science and Nutrition, Environmental Sciences and Biotechnology, Speech Pathology and Audiology, Physical Education.
- College of Information & Electronic Engineering: Division of Information Engineering and Telecommunications.
- College of Medicine: Program of Medical Sciences, Division of Nursing.
- College of International Studies (C.I.S): Program of International Studies.

=== Graduate schools ===
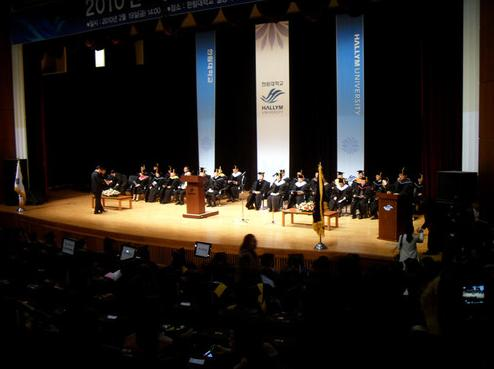
Hallym's graduation ceremony

==== Master’s Degree Program ====
- College of Humanities Korean language and literature, English language and literature,
- History, Philosophy, Psychology, Sociology, Social welfare, Law,
- Economics, Business administration, Finance, Political Science,
- Communication, Financial Economics
- Natural Sciences Mathematics, Physics, Chemistry, Biology, Statistics,
- Biomedical Sciences, Food science and nutrition,
- Environmental sciences and biotechnology, Nursing science,
- Biomedical gerontology, Speech pathology & audiology,
- Molecular medicine
- Engineering- Computer engineering, Electronics engineering
- Art & Physical Education
- Medicine- Medical Science

==== Ph.D. program ====
- Humanities and Social Sciences Korean language and literature, English language and literature,
- History, Economics, Business administration, Political Science,
- Sociology, Social welfare, Law, Psychology, Finance, Communication
- Natural Sciences Chemistry, Biology, Statistics, Biomedical Sciences,
- Food science and nutrition, Environmental sciences and biotechnology,
- Biomedical gerontology, Speech pathology & audiology,
- Molecular medicine, Social public health
- Engineering Computer engineering, Electronics engineering
- Art & Physical Education Physical education
- Medicine Medical Science

==== Department ====
- Graduate School of Business: Master of Business Administration (MBA), Advanced Management Program (AMP).
- Graduate School of Social Welfare: Master of Social Welfare, Master of Gerontology, Master of Family Therapy, Master of Audiology, Master of Speech Pathology.
- Graduate School of International Studies: Department of Convention Management, Department of Japanese Studies.
- Graduate School of Public Health: Public Health, Elderly and Family Health Care.
- Graduate School of Clinical Dentistry: Oral & Maxillofacial Implantology, Clinical Orthodontics, Esthetic Restorative Dentistry.
- Graduate School of Clinical Nursing Science.

=== International Rankings ===
University rankings
QS National	General	35
USNWR National	General	34
THE Asia (Asia version)	General	301-350
USNWR Asia	General	324
ARWU World	Research	801-900
QS World	General	1001-1200
THE World	General	1001+
USNWR World	General	1153
THE World (Young)	General/Young	251-300

== Successive presidents ==
- ? - Hyun Soong-jong
- 1st - Dr. Hyeon Seung-Jong
- 2nd - Dr. Jeong Beom-Mo
- 3rd - Dr. Lee Sang-Ju
- 4th - Dr. Han Dal-Seon
- 5th - Dr. Lee Sang-Woo
- 6th - Dr. Choongsoo Kim
- 7th - Dr. Lee Young-Sun
- 8th - Dr. Ro, Kun Il
- 9th - Dr. Choongsoo Kim

== Notable alumni ==
- Lee Ji-hoon, actor
