= South Korean won (1945–1953) =

Currency of South Korea

대한민국 원 (Korean); 大韓民國圓 (Korean)
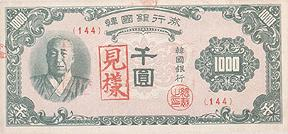
- 1000 won note (1950)

Units of account
- Plural: The language(s) of this currency do(es) not have a morphological plural distinction.
- Symbol: None, the currency was referred to by using the hanja character 圓
- Subunit
- 1/100: jeon (전/錢)

Denominations
- Banknotes: 5, 10, 20, 50 jeon 1, 5, 10, 100, 500, 1000 won
- Coins: Japanese 1 sen

Demographics
- User(s): Southern Korea under U.S. control (1945-1948); South Korea (1948-1953)

Issuance
- Central bank: Bank of Joseon (1945-1950); Bank of Korea (1950-1953)
- Website: www.bok.or.kr
- Printer: National Printing Bureau (~ 1951); Korea Minting and Security Printing Corporation (1951 ~)
- Website: www.komsep.com

Valuation
- Pegged with: US dollar
- This infobox shows the latest status before this currency was rendered obsolete.

The won (Korean: 원) was the first South Korean currency and was in use from August 15, 1945, to February 15, 1953.

== Etymology ==
Won is a cognate of the Chinese yuan and Japanese yen. The won was subdivided into 100 jeon (Korean: 전; RR: jeon; MR: chŏn).

== History ==
Following the end of the Colonial Era and the division of Korea, the won was introduced to replace the Korean yen. The first banknotes were issued by the Bank of Joseon until 1950, when the currency management switched to the Bank of Korea.

At the time of its introduction in 1945 the won was pegged to the Japanese yen at a rate of 1 won = 1 yen. In October of the same year the anchor currency was changed to the US dollar at a rate of 15 won = 1 dollar. Toward the end of the Korean War the won was devalued at 6000 won = 1 dollar. Following that the hwan was introduced as the new currency at a rate of 1 hwan = 100 won.

== Coins ==
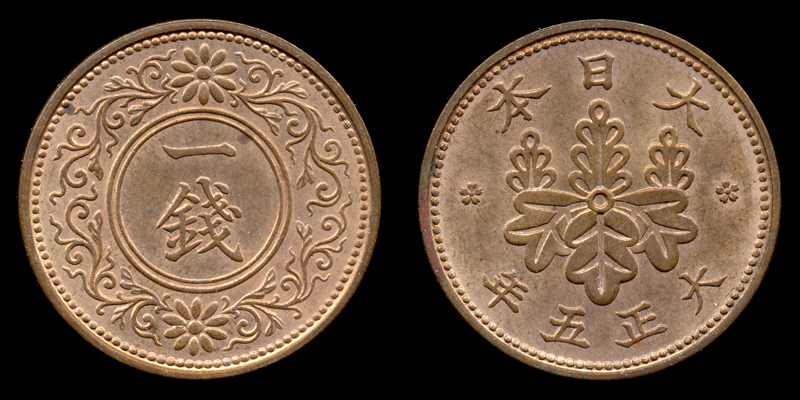
The 1 sen coins introduced under Japanese rule remained in use.

No coins were issued by South Korea during this period; however, Japanese 1 sen coins continued to be used for small transactions until February 1953. South Korea would eventually introduce its first coins for circulation in 1959.

== Banknotes ==
=== Bank of Joseon issued notes ===
The won was subdivided into 100 jeon. Only banknotes were issued. Initially, the won was issued by Bank of Joseon with a similar design to the older notes of the Japanese occupation period. However, there were two subtle and important differences. The new notes replaced the paulownia, the badge of the government of Japan, with the Rose of Sharon, South Korea's national flower; and the clause about exchangeability with the Japanese yen was removed.

Bank of Joseon issued notes
Value
5 jeon
10 jeon
20 jeon
50 jeon
1 won
5 won
10 won
100 won

=== Bank of Korea issued notes ===
On June 12, 1950, the Bank of Korea was established and assumed the duties of Bank of Joseon. The Bank of Joseon's notes were still kept in circulation as not all denominations were replaced by the Bank of Korea's notes.

Bank of Korea issued notes (in Korean)
Image		Value	Dimensions	Main Color	Description		Date of		Printer
Obverse	Reverse	Value	Dimensions	Main Color	Obverse	Reverse	issue	withdrawal	Printer
		100 won	158 × 78 mm	brown	Gwanghwamun	Value	July 22, 1950	February 17, 1953	National Printing Bureau (Japan)
		500 won	145 × 61 mm	blue	Syngman Rhee	Pagoda Gongweon in Seoul	October 10, 1952	February 17, 1953	KOMSEP
		1000 won	171 × 78 mm	green	Syngman Rhee	Value	July 22, 1950	February 17, 1953	National Printing Bureau
		1000 won	145 × 61 mm	blue	Syngman Rhee	Pagoda Gongweon in Seoul	October 10, 1952	February 17, 1953	KOMSEP
These images are to scale at 0.7 pixel per millimetre (18 pixel per inch). For table standards, see the banknote specification table.

== See also ==
- Economy of South Korea
- History of South Korea

Preceded by: Korean yen Reason: Division of Korea and moving toward a full sovereign nation from Allied occupation Ratio: at par	Currency of South Korea; 1945 – 1953	Succeeded by: South Korean hwan Reason: inflation Ratio: 1 hwan = 100 won
