= South Korean hwan =

1953–1962 currency of South Korea

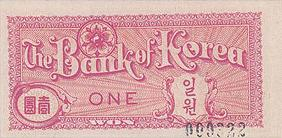
- The reverse side of a one hwan note
- Plural: The language(s) of this currency do(es) not have a morphological plural distinction.

Denominations
- Subunit
- 1/100: jeon (전/錢) (Theoretical only, never used)
- Banknotes: 1, 5, 10, 50, 100, 500, 1000 hwan
- Coins: 10, 50, 100 hwan

Demographics
- User(s): South Korea

Issuance
- Central bank: Bank of Korea
- Website: www.bok.or.kr
- Printer: Korea Minting and Security Printing Corporation
- Website: english.komsco.com
- Mint: Philadelphia Mint
- This infobox shows the latest status before this currency was rendered obsolete.

- South Korean hwan
- Hangul: 환
- Hanja: 圜
- RR: hwan
- MR: hwan

The hwan (Korean: 환) was the currency of South Korea between February 15, 1953, and June 9, 1962. It succeeded the first South Korean won and preceded the second South Korean won.

== History ==
Due to the devaluation of the first South Korean won (from 15 won to the U.S. dollar in 1945 to 6000 won to the dollar in 1953), the hwan was introduced in 1953 at the rate of 1 hwan = 100 won. The hwan was nominally subdivided into 100 jeon but the lowest denomination issued was 1 hwan. The hwan also suffered from inflation and a series of devaluations occurred.

Pegs for the South Korean hwan
Date introduced	Value of U.S. dollar in hwan
February 15, 1953	60
15 December 1953	180
August 15, 1955	500
February 23, 1960	650
January 1, 1961	1000
February 2, 1961	1250

In 1962, the second South Korean won was reintroduced at a rate of 1 won = 10 hwan, after which inflation finally slowed down.

== Coins ==
In 1959, coins were introduced in denominations of 10, 50 and 100 hwan. They were minted by the Philadelphia Mint.

Hwan Coins (in Korean)
Image		Value	Technical parameters			Description		Date of		
Obverse	Reverse	Value	Diameter	Mass	Composition	Obverse	Reverse	first minting	issue	withdrawal
		10 hwan	19.1 mm	2.46 g	Copper 95% Zinc 5%	Rose of Sharon, value, bank title (Hangul)	Value (digit), "Republic of Korea", year of minting	1959 (Korean calendar 4292)	October 20, 1959	March 22, 1975
		50 hwan	22.86 mm	3.69 g	Copper 70% Zinc 18% Nickel 12%	Geobukseon, value, bank title (Hangul)	Value (digit), "Republic of Korea", year of minting	1959 (Korean calendar 4292)	October 20, 1959	March 22, 1975
		100 hwan	26.0 mm	6.74 g	Cupronickel; Copper 75% Nickel 25%	Syngman Rhee, value, bank title (Hangul)	Value (digit), "Republic of Korea", year of minting	1959 (Korean calendar 4292)	October 30, 1959	June 10, 1962
These images are to scale at 2.5 pixels per millimetre. For table standards, see the coin specification table.

The 10 and 50 hwan coins continued to circulate until March 22, 1975, accepted as if it were 1 and 5 won coins, respectively. The 100 hwan coins were withdrawn on June 10, 1962.

== Banknotes ==
In 1953, banknotes were introduced in denominations of 1, 5, 10, 100 and 1000 hwan. Some of these notes were printed in the U.S. and gave the denomination in English and Hangul as won. 500 hwan notes were introduced in 1956, followed by 1000 hwan in 1957 and 50 hwan in 1958.

=== American printed notes ===
The first hwan notes were printed by the United States Government Printing Office. All Hanja and Hangul inscription on both the obverse and reverse sides of these notes are written right to left (traditional direction), instead of the modern (Westernized) left to right.

They have a few obvious defects. The term "hwan" is written in Hanja (圜) while "won" is written in Hangul (원) and English. Those problems were attributed to an urgent need for new banknotes and the change in currency name, as well as the decision to commission the new notes to be manufactured in the United States. Unaware banknote catalog editors may erroneously categorize these notes as part of the old won system, such as the Standard Catalog of World Paper Money by Albert Pick.

American printed hwan notes (in Korean)
Image		Value	Dimensions	Main colour	Description		Date of	
Obverse	Reverse	Value	Dimensions	Main colour	Obverse	Reverse	issue	withdrawal
		1 hwan	111 × 54 mm	Pink	Bank name (Hanja), value (Hangul and Hanja)	Bank of Korea's symbol	February 17, 1953	June 10, 1962
		5 hwan	111 × 54 mm	Red	Bank name (Hanja), value (Hangul and Hanja)	Bank of Korea's symbol	February 17, 1953	June 10, 1962
		10 hwan	156 × 66 mm	Purple	Bank name (Hanja), value (Hangul and Hanja), Geobukseon	Bank of Korea's symbol	February 17, 1953	June 10, 1962
		100 hwan	156 × 66 mm	Green	Bank name (Hanja), value (Hangul and Hanja), Geobukseon	Bank of Korea's symbol	February 17, 1953	June 10, 1962
		1000 hwan	156 × 66 mm	Brown	Bank name (Hanja), value (Hangul and Hanja), Geobukseon	Bank of Korea's symbol	February 17, 1953	June 10, 1962
These images are to scale at 0.7 pixel per millimetre (18 pixel per inch). For table standards, see the banknote specification table.

=== Korean printed notes ===
Korean printed hwan notes (in Korean)
Image		Value	Dimensions	Description		Date of	
Obverse	Reverse	Value	Dimensions	Obverse	Reverse	issue	withdrawal
		10 hwan	156 × 66 mm	Namdaemun	Haegeumgang near Geoje	March 17, 1953	June 10, 1962
		10 hwan	156 × 66 mm	Namdaemun	Haegeumgang near Geoje	December 15, 1953	June 10, 1962
		50 hwan	149 × 66 mm	Independence Gate	Yi Sun-sin's bronze statue, Geobukseon	August 15, 1958	June 10, 1962
		100 hwan	156 × 66 mm	Lee Sung-man	Independence Gate	December 18, 1953	June 10, 1962
		100 hwan	156 × 66 mm	Lee Sung-man	Independence Gate	February 1, 1954	June 10, 1962
		100 hwan	156 × 66 mm	Lee Sung-man	Value	March 26, 1957	June 10, 1962
		100 hwan	156 × 66 mm	Mother and her child holding a savings account booklet	Independence Gate	May 16, 1962	June 10, 1962
		500 hwan	156 × 73 mm	Lee Sung-man	Value	March 26, 1956	June 10, 1962
		500 hwan	156 × 73 mm	Lee Sung-man	Value	August 15, 1958	June 10, 1962
		500 hwan	156 × 73 mm	Sejong the Great	Main building of the Bank of Korea	April 19, 1961	June 10, 1962
		1000 hwan	166 × 73 mm	Lee Sung-man	Bank of Korea's symbol	March 26, 1957	June 10, 1962
		1000 hwan	165 × 73 mm	Sejong the Great	Torch	August 15, 1960	June 10, 1962
These images are to scale at 0.7 pixel per millimetre (18 pixel per inch). For table standards, see the banknote specification table.

== See also ==
- Economy of South Korea
- History of South Korea

Preceded by: South Korean won (1945); Reason: inflation Ratio: 1 hwan = 100 won	Currency of South Korea; 1953 – 1962	Succeeded by: South Korean won Reason: inflation Ratio: 1 won = 10 hwan
