= Korean Tiger Bullion Series Medal =

Gold Bullion Medals in Korea

- South Korea
- Composition: 99.99% fine gold
- Years of minting: 2016 to present

Obverse
- Design: Features the powerful Korean tiger. Yearly design change. Inscriptions: KOREAN TIGER

Reverse
- Design: Depicts representation of the Korean peninsula in Hangul. Inscriptions: REPUBLIC OF KOREA, “[Year]”, “[Actual Weight: 1/4oz, 1/2oz, 1oz]”, FINE GOLD 999.9]

The Korean Tiger Bullion Series Medal (Korean: 호랑이불리온) is a series of gold bullion medals issued by the Korean Minting, Security Printing & ID Card Operating Corporation (KOMSCO). The first series was introduced in June 2016. The medals are minted in the following denominations of 1/4 oz, 1/2 oz, and 1 oz of 99.99% of fine gold.

KOMSCO plan the tiger bullion series as a yearly issue, the design changes every year. Unlike other bullion coins like Perth Mint Kangaroo Bullion and Chinese Gold Panda. It has a limited annual mintage, this may raise their numismatic value over the value of gold used.

== The Design - Korean Tiger ==
In Korean history and culture, the tiger is regarded as a guardian that drives away evil spirit and a sacred creature that brings good luck – the symbol of courage and power.

Obverse: Features the powerful Korean tiger.
Reverse: Depicts representation of the Korean peninsula in Hangul.

== Anti-Counterfeit Technology ==
In order to prevent forgery, the medal was created with the traditional hallmark and latent image technology. The image changes letters according to the tilted angles, From [AU] to [9999] purity of the fine gold.

== Mintage ==
The following table present the Korean Tiger series mintage by KOMSCO, Korean Mint

Year	Composition	Type	Weight	Diameter	Mintage	Remarks
2016	AU 999.9	Proof	31.1g	35mm	2016	COA, with presentation box
2016	AU 999.9	Proof	15.55g	28mm	4032	COA, with presentation box
2016	AU 999.9	Proof	7.78g	22mm	4032	COA, with presentation box
2017	AU 999.9	UNC	31.1g	35mm	2017	COA, with presentation box
2017	AU 999.9	UNC	15.55g	28mm	4034	COA, with presentation box
2017	AU 999.9	UNC	7.78g	22mm	4034	COA, with presentation box
2018	AG 999	BU	31.1g	40mm	30,000	Individually Encapsulated or Tube
2018	AU 999.9	UNC	31.1g	35mm	2018	COA, with presentation box
2018	AU 999.9	UNC	15.55g	28mm	4036	COA, with presentation box
2018	AU 999.9	UNC	7.78g	22mm	4036	COA, with presentation box
2018	AG 999	BU	311g	80mm	2,000	Individually Encapsulated or Tube
2018	AU 999.9	UNC	3.11g	16mm	5,000	Individually in an Assay card
2019	AG 999	BU	31.1g	40mm	20,000	Individually Encapsulated or Tube
2019	AU 999	UNC	31.1g	40mm	2019	Individually Encapsulated

== See also ==
- Korea Minting and Security Printing Corporation
- Gold as an investment
