= South Korea and the International Monetary Fund =

South Korea and the International Monetary Fund (IMF) partner together to assist the country in managing its financial system. South Korea's economy is considered fundamentally sound because of the balance of their banking sector and their aim toward a zero structural balance without compromising their ability to sustain debt. The IMF Board in 2019 assessed that the policy framework and financial system in place are sturdy and firmly set.

== History ==
=== IMF membership ===
South Korea joined the IMF on August 13, 1955. The relationship between the state and the institution has been steady for the most part. The country contributed $8.582 billion SDR (Special Drawing Rights) to the IMF quota, which comprises 1.81% of the IMF's funds. South Korea has 87,292 votes in the IMF, which is 1.73% of the total. South Korea's member of the IMF Board of Governor is Kim Dong-yeon and the alternate Board of Governor is Juyeol Lee. In 2019, the IMF and South Korea continued their partnership in support of capacity development. South Korea was willing to give $20 million of US dollars of support. This extension over the next 5 years should assist in technical assistance and training for low income states.

As of recent, the IMF sent a team to Seoul to discuss the fiscal policy that is supposed to assist growth in the short and medium term.

=== The Asian Financial Crisis ===
==== Intervention ====
After the Korean War in 1953, the South Korean economy achieved sustained growth, but had accumulated an unseen amount of short term foreign debt. Korea was one of the last countries to be affected by the Asian Financial Crisis. The won dropped in value and a large investment panic in the state led to the eventual bankruptcies of chaebols that had borrowed huge amounts for their individual projects. In late November 1997, an IMF economist team was brought to Seoul to discuss a "bail out package" that was worth $60 billion and included several conditions that were to help restore the health of the country's economy. Other members of the World Bank and Asian Development Bank came to address the issues as well. The bailout had conditions that forced Korea to go through restructuring policies and programs, such as new labor market policies that allowed more flexibility in terminating employees.

South Korea signed the agreement with the IMF to address their deficients due to the 1997 Asian financial crisis.

The structural provisions included:

- increased flexibility of exchange rates
- tightening of monetary policy
- structural reform to remove features of the economy that would stunt growth
- increased activity of foreign players in the domestic financial market

Other policies and programs forced Korea to slash government expenditure, raise interest rates, liberalize trade, restructure the government, and stop Korean conglomerates from expanding, in the hopes of stopping inflation and increasing foreign reserves. This action stabilized South Korea's foreign exchange market.

The policies impacted the South Korean population and families. By May 1998, 80% of households had suffered from lower incomes. Unemployment more than tripled from 2.05% in 1997 to 6.96% in 1999. South Koreans participated in a gold collecting campaign in the hopes of paying off the loans. Approximately one-quarter of the nation's population participated in the campaign from all social classes, selling gold such as wedding bands and sports medals. $2.2 billion was raised from the gold campaign.

The residual costs from the loan conditions continue to affect the country These costs are reflected in cuts in funding for government programs, higher unemployment and slower economic growth. South Korea created a safety net with other Asian nations, to avoid any future financial crisis.

==== Financial Safety Net ====
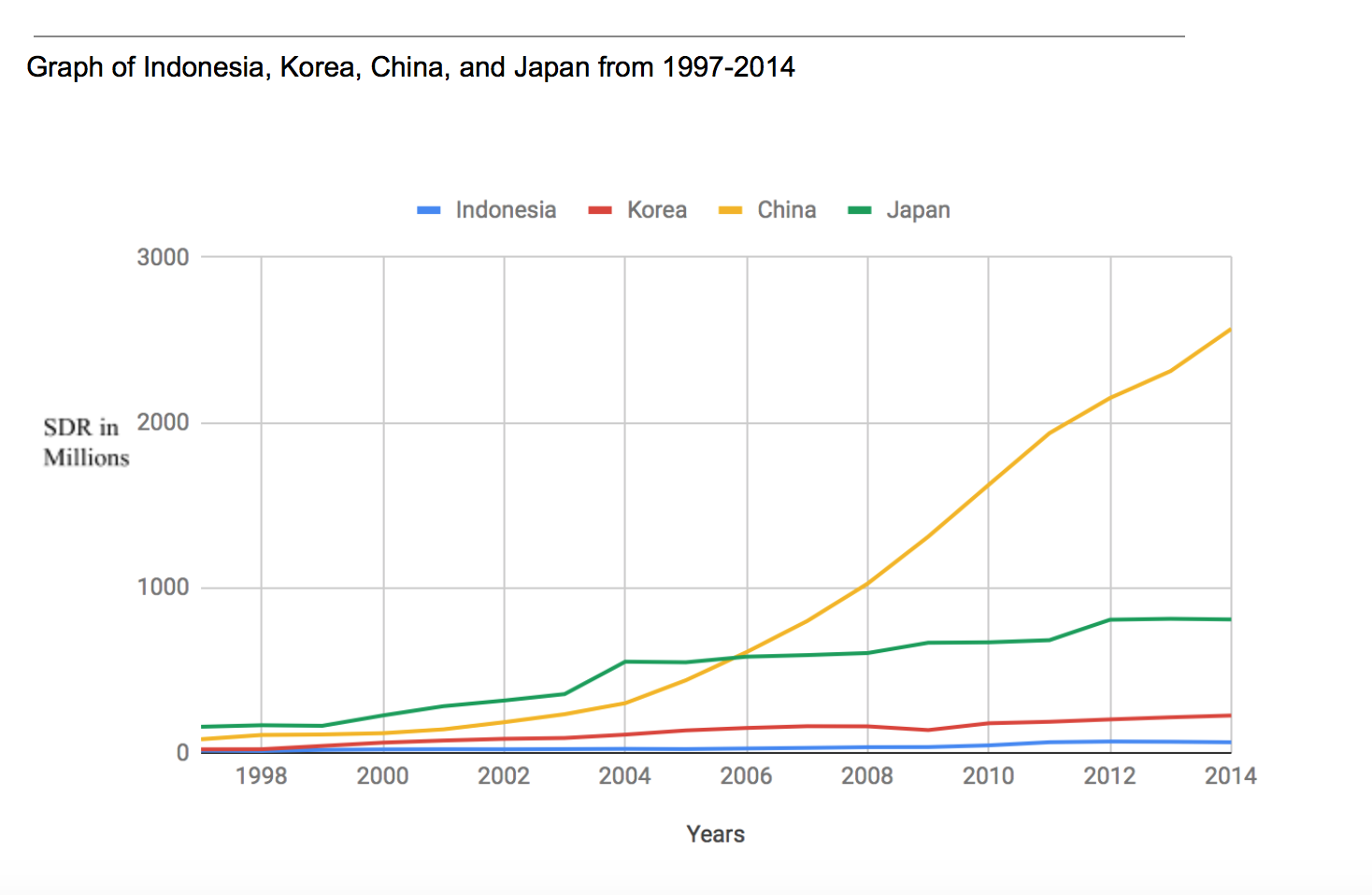
Data is from the OECD on Countries' Government Reserves. Showing how countries have saved up more reserves since 1997.

South Korea has not borrowed from the IMF since the 1997 crisis. According to the Organization for Economic Co-operation and Development (OECD), South Korea's reserves have increased from 21.556 billion SDR in 1997 to 247.759 billion SDR in 2014. As of 2022, the nation's foreign reserves were around $420 billion.

As a result of the increasing complexity in world financial systems, South Korea joined the CMI (Chiang Mai Initiative materialization). The CMI is an agreement between Southeast Asian countries to use each country's respective foreign reserves to stabilize the region's economies in case of an emergency. The agreement helps to prevent financial contagion and is a safeguard against market panic. The agreement is not enforced and has never been used. Parties include South Korea, China, Hong Kong, Japan, Indonesia, Malaysia, Philippines, Singapore, Thailand, Vietnam, Cambodia, Myanmar, Brunei and Laos. The agreement allowed these nations to stop hoarding foreign reserves, which could theoretically help their economies grow, increase trust among foreign investors for local currencies, and act as a safety net.

== In popular culture ==
The Asian financial crisis, its effects and consequences are depicted in Reborn Rich, a 2022 TV series. Another 2022 series, Twenty-Five Twenty-One takes place during the crisis. Default depicts the crisis from three different perspectives. The financial crisis is depicted as a storyline in Undercover Miss Hong, a 2026 South Korean Drama series.
