= Park Seung =

Korean economist (born 1936)

Park Seung (Korean: 박승; Hanja: 朴昇; born February 16, 1936) is a Korean economist who most recently served as a governor of the Bank of Korea from 2002 to 2006. Before becoming a governor of the Bank of Korea, he was a professor at Chung-Ang University, a president of Korea Economic Association (1999-2000), a senior secretary to the President for Economic Affairs under the Office of the President, and a minister of Ministry of Construction (1988-1989).

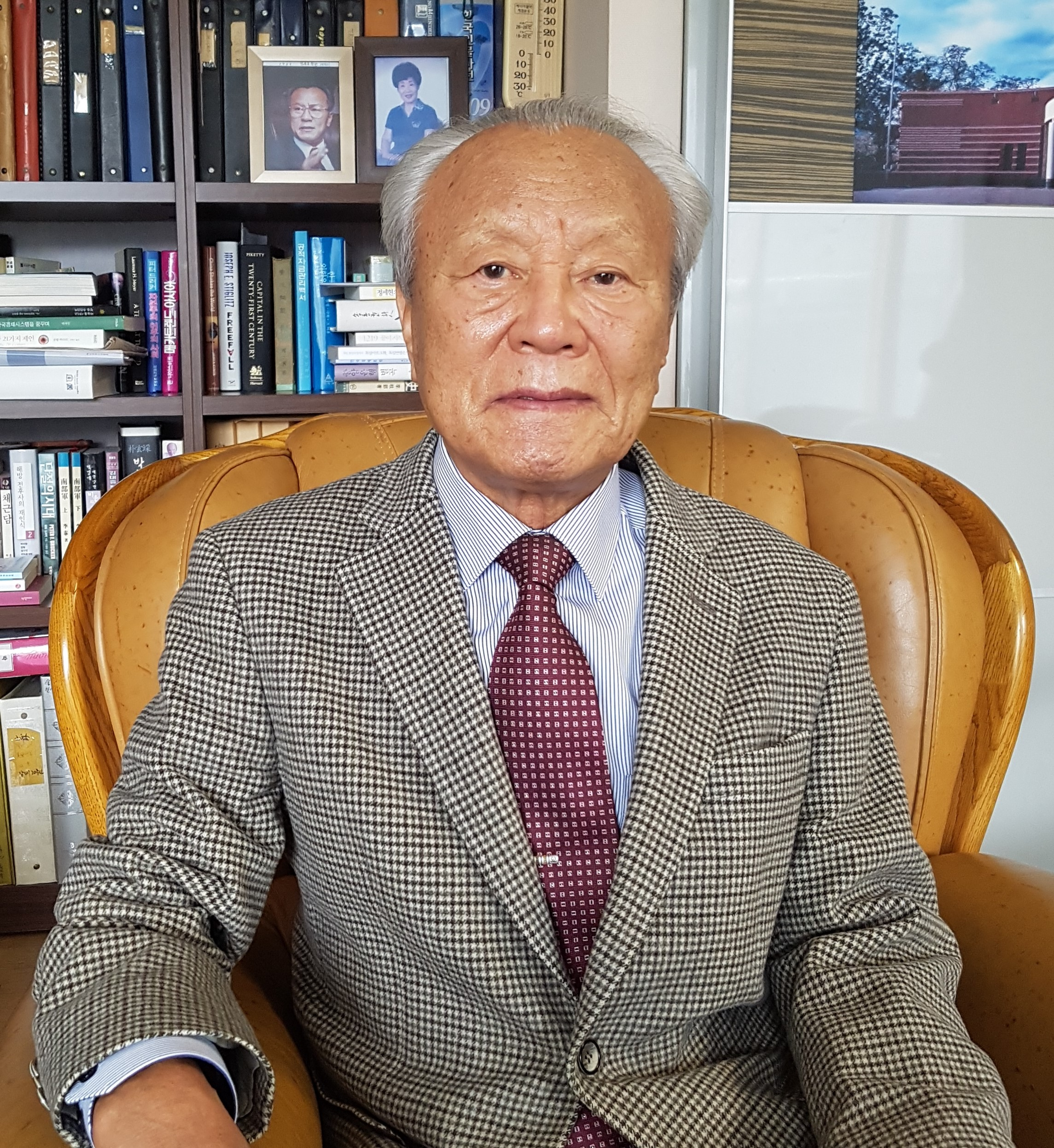

== Early life and education ==
Park was born in Gimje, North Jeolla Province, as the second son of six children under his mother, Kang Sinyong and father, Park Hyunsik. After graduating from the Department of Economics at Seoul National University in 1961, Park worked at the Bank of Korea between 1961 and 1976. He obtained his master's and Ph.D. degrees in economics from the State University of New York at Albany in 1974. His dissertation is titled Development Effect of Foreign Capital in the Labor Surplus Economy.

== Career ==
After obtaining his Ph.D. degree, he returned to the Bank of Korea. During 1974–1975, he led the Economic Advisory Group for Saudi Arabia, which was commissioned by the Korean government. In 1976, he was hired as a professor in the Department of Economics at Chung-Ang University. He held positions at the university as a dean of College of Political Science and Economics (1984), a dean of Graduate School (1988), and in 1999, he became an elected president of Korea Economic Association.

Under the regime of President Roh Tae Woo, he served as a senior secretary to the President for Economics Affairs under the Office of the President, and as a minister of the Ministry of Construction. He was behind successfully planning and implementing the first-ever project for building five new towns in Korea, including Bundang and Ilsan in Gyeonggi Province. This was part of a larger attempt to carry out the provision of two million housing units in the midst of a housing shortage crisis, proposed during President Roh's presidential campaign.

He returned as a professor to the Department of Economics at Chung-Ang University in 1990 and continued teaching at the university until his retirement in 2001. In 2002, he was named by then-president Kim Dae-jung as the governor of the Bank of Korea and the chairperson of the Monetary Policy Committee. During his appointment, he was a proponent of the independence of the central bank. His effort propelled the National Assembly to pass the amendment of the Bank of Korea Act in 2003, which stipulated that the vice-governor of the central bank sit on the Monetary Policy Committee and the central bank decide on its own budget except for expenses on salary and wages. He attempted to redenominate the Korean currency to the ratio of 1,000:1, but the effort did not come to fruition.

== Personal life ==
Park donated to his alma mater, Baekseok Elementary School to build a library with an auditorium, and to another one of his alma mater, Iri Technical High School. He was awarded the Distinguished Alumni Award on June 4, 2004, from his alma mater, the State University of New York at Albany. On May 19, 2007, he received the honorary degree of Doctor of Humane Letters at the Spring Commencement. During the 19th presidential election of the Republic of Korea in 2017, he aided in President Jae-in Moon's election as the chairman of his advisory committee. He has been married to Youngha Kwon since 1963, with two sons and three daughters.

== Books ==
Park has published 11 books in Korean. His most notable publication is The Theory of Economic Development, published in 1977, which was widely used as a college textbook for 30 years in Korea.

- 1969 The Theory of Korean Economic Development, Ilsinsa
- 1976 The Theory of Economic Development (1990 and 2000 Revised Edition), Pakyoungsa
- 1982 S. S. Kusnetz, Yoopoong Publishing Company
- 1983 The Theory of Korean Economic Policy, Pakyoungsa
- 1987 Modern Economic Growth (originally written by Simon Kuznets, Joint translation), The Korea Economic Daily
- 1996 The Two Faces of Korean Economy, Golyeowon
- 2006 The Dynamic of Korean Economy Comes From Crises, Bank of Korea
- 2010 Looking at the Sky, Looking at the Stars (Autobiography), the Hankook Ilbo
- 2011 Thinking About Dae-Jung Kim (co-author), Samin
- 2012 Don't Be Afraid, Youth (co-author), The Hankook Ilbo
- 2012 The One Thing I Regret In Life (co-author), Wisdom Kyunghyang

== Honors ==
- 1964 The Cabinet Secretary General Award, Republic of Korea
- 1969 The Minister of the Economic Planning Board Award, Republic of Korea
- 1987 Order of Civil Merit, Magnolia Medal, Republic of Korea
- 1989 The First Order of Civil Merit, Republic of Korea
- 2004 Distinguished Alumni Award, State University of New York at Albany
- 2007 Honorary Degree of Doctor of Humane Letters, State University of New York at Albany
- 2011 Distinguished Jeollabuk-do Person Award
- 2014 Distinguished Alumni Award, College of Commerce, Seoul National University
- 2015 Honorary Award, Alumni Association, Chung-Ang University
