= South Korean won =

Currency of South Korea

대한민국 원 (Korean)
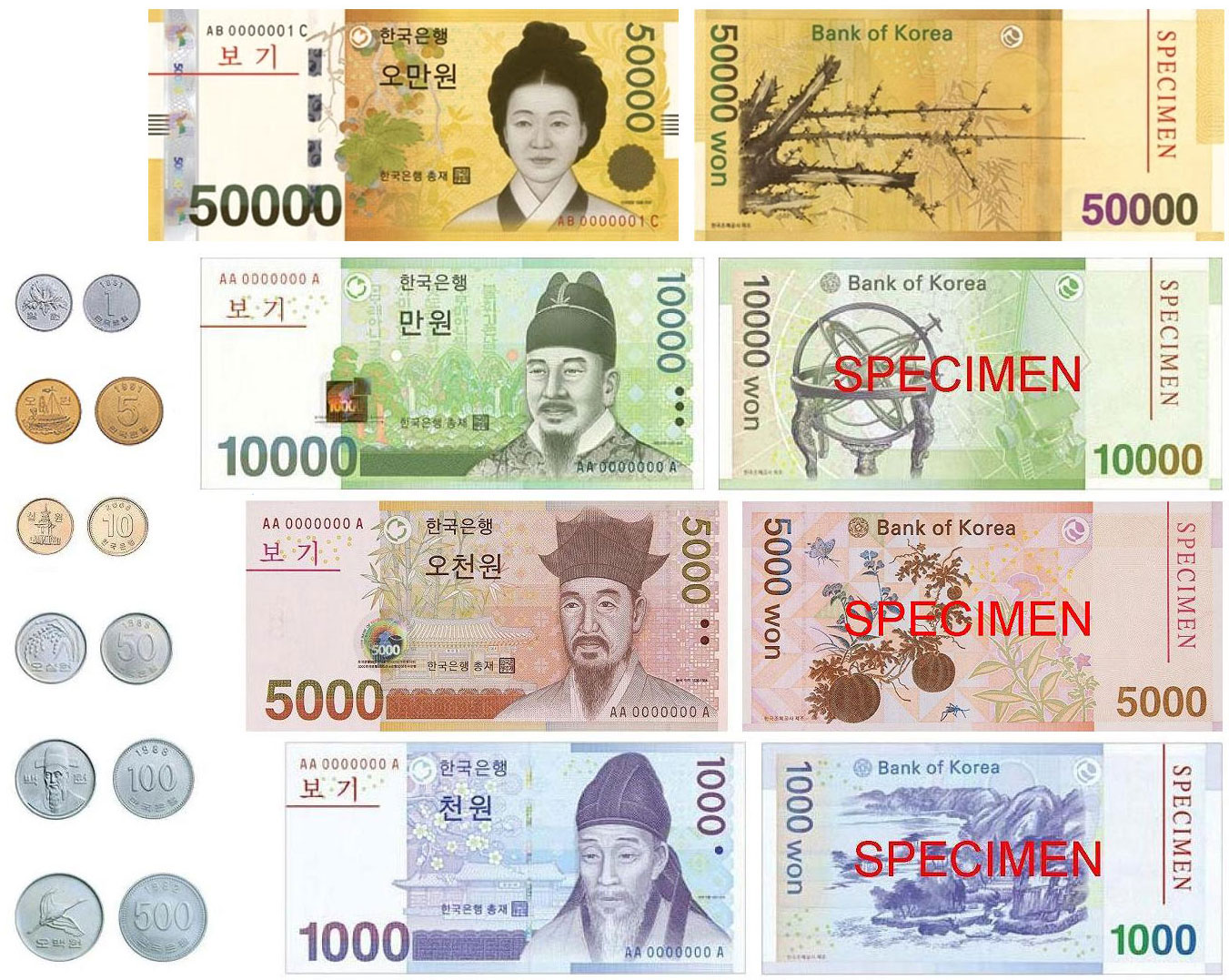

ISO 4217
- Code: KRW (numeric: 410)

Units of account
- Base unit: won (Korean: 원)
- Plural: The language(s) of this currency do(es) not have a morphological plural distinction.
- Symbol: ₩
- Subunit
- 1/100: jeon (Korean: 전) (Note: Now only used in foreign exchange rates; no longer used in transactions.)

Denominations
- Banknotes: ₩1,000, ₩2,000, ₩5,000, ₩10,000, ₩50,000
- Coins: ₩1, ₩5, ₩10, ₩50, ₩100, ₩500

Demographics
- Date of introduction: 1949 (first introduced); 1962 (current version after re-introduction)
- User(s): South Korea

Issuance
- Central bank: Bank of Korea
- Website: eng.bok.or.kr
- Printer: Korea Minting and Security Printing Corporation
- Website: english.komsco.com
- Mint: Korea Minting and Security Printing Corporation
- Website: english.komsco.com

Valuation
- Inflation: 2.4% (June 2024)
- Value: Exchange rate US$1 = 1,368 KRW

- Republic of Korea won
- Hangul: 대한민국 원
- Hanja: 大韓民國 원
- RR: Daehanminguk won
- MR: Taehanmin'guk wŏn
- The current won (원) does not officially have any hanja associated with it.

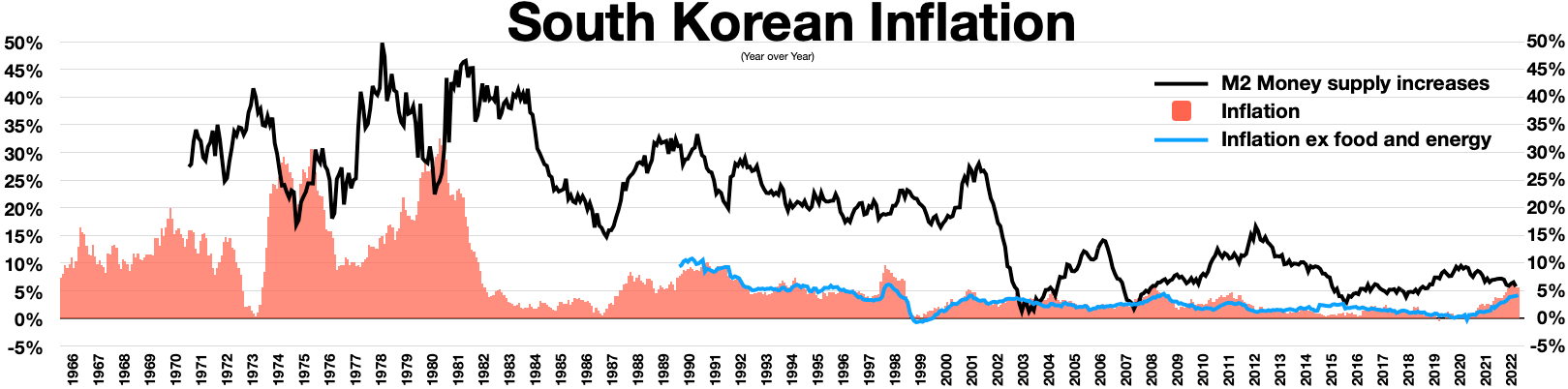
South Korean inflation M2 money supply increases Inflation Inflation ex food and energy

The South Korean won, sometimes known as the Republic of Korea won (symbol: ₩; code: KRW; Korean: 대한민국 원), is the official currency of South Korea.

Each won (the base unit) is technically divided into 100 jeon, but the jeon is no longer used for everyday transactions and appears only in foreign exchange rates. The currency is issued by the Bank of Korea, based in the capital city of Seoul. The South Korean won was first issued in 1949, then was replaced by the South Korean hwan between 1953 and 1962, before the adoption of the current South Korean won in 1962.

== Etymology ==
The old "won" was a cognate of the Chinese yuan, which was derived from the Spanish-American silver dollar. It is derived from the hanja 圓 (원, won), meaning 'round', which describes the shape of the silver dollar.

The won was subdivided into 100 jeon (Korean: 전; Hanja: 錢; MR: chŏn), itself a cognate of the East Asian unit of weight mace and synonymous with money in general. The current won (1962 to present) is written in hangul only and does not officially have any hanja associated with it.

== First South Korean won ==
=== History ===
The Korean won, Chinese yuan and Japanese yen were all derived from the Spanish-American silver dollar, a coin widely used for international trade between Asia and the Americas from the 16th to 19th centuries.

During the colonial era under the Japanese (1910–45), the won was replaced by the Korean yen which was at par with the Japanese yen.

After World War II ended in 1945, Korea was divided, resulting in two separate currencies, both called won, for the South and the North. Both the Southern won and the Northern won replaced the yen at par. The first South Korean won was subdivided into 100 jeon.

The South Korean won initially had a fixed exchange rate to the U.S. dollar at a rate of 15 won to 1 dollar. A series of devaluations followed, the later ones, in part, due to the Korean War (1950–53). The pegs were:

Pegs for the first South Korean won
Date introduced	Value of U.S. dollar in won
October 1945	15
July 15, 1947	50
October 1, 1948	450
June 14, 1949	900 (non-government transactions only)
May 1, 1950	1,800
November 1, 1950	2,500
April 1, 1951	6,000

The first South Korean won was replaced by the hwan on February 15, 1953, at a rate of 1 hwan = 100 won.

=== Banknotes ===
In 1946, the Bank of Joseon introduced 10 and 100 won notes. These were followed in 1949 by 5 and 1,000 won notes.

A new central bank, the Bank of Korea, was established on June 12, 1950, and assumed the duties of Bank of Joseon. Notes were introduced (some dated 1949) in denominations of 5, 10 and 50 jeon, and 100 and 1,000 won. The 500 won notes were introduced in 1952. In 1953, a series of banknotes was issued which, although it gave the denominations in English in won, were, in fact, the first issues of the hwan.

== Second South Korean won ==
=== History ===
The won was reintroduced on June 10, 1962, at a rate of 1 won = 10 hwan. It became the sole legal tender on March 22, 1975, with the withdrawal of the last circulating hwan coins. Its ISO 4217 code is KRW. At the reintroduction of the won in 1962, its value was pegged at 125 won = US$1. The following pegs operated between 1962 and 1980:

Pegs for the second South Korean won
Date introduced	Value of U.S. dollar in won
June 10, 1962	125
May 3, 1964	255
August 3, 1972	400
December 7, 1974	480
January 12, 1980	580

On February 27, 1980, efforts were initiated to lead to a floating exchange rate. The won was allowed to float on December 24, 1997, when an agreement was signed with the International Monetary Fund. Shortly after, the won was devalued by almost half, as part of the 1997 Asian financial crisis.

=== Coins ===
Until 1966, 10 and 50 hwan coins, revalued as 1 and 5 won, were the only coins in circulation. New coins, denominated in won, were introduced by the Bank of Korea on August 16, 1966, in denominations of 1, 5 and 10 won, with the 1 won struck in brass and the 5 and 10 won in bronze. These were the first South Korean coins to display the date in the Gregorian calendar, earlier coins having used the Korean calendar. The 10 and 50 hwan coins were demonetized on March 22, 1975.

In 1968, as the intrinsic value of the brass 1 won coin far surpassed its face value, new aluminium 1 won coins were issued to replace them. As an attempt to further reduce currency production costs, new 5 and 10 won coins were issued in 1970, struck in brass. Cupronickel 100 won coins were also introduced that year, followed by cupronickel 50 won coins in 1972.

1966–1982 issued coins (in Korean)
Image		Value	Technical parameters			Description			Date of			BOK series designation
Obverse	Reverse	Value	Diameter	Mass	Composition	Edge	Obverse	Reverse	First minting	Issue	Issue Suspended	BOK series designation
		₩1	17.2 mm	1.7 g	Brass; 60% copper 40% zinc	Plain	Rose of Sharon, value, bank title (hangul)	Value (digit), bank title, year of minting	1966	August 16, 1966	December 1, 1980	Series I (가)
		₩1	17.2 mm	0.729 g	100% aluminium	Plain	Rose of Sharon, value, bank title (hangul)	Value (digit), bank title, year of minting	1968	August 26, 1968	1992	Series II (나)
		₩5	20.4 mm	3.09 g	Commercial bronze 88% copper 12% zinc	Plain	Geobukseon, value, bank title (hangul)	Value (digit), bank title, year of minting	1966	August 16, 1966	1992	Series I (가)
		₩5	20.4 mm	2.95 g	High brass 65% copper 35% zinc	Plain	Geobukseon, value, bank title (hangul)	Value (digit), bank title, year of minting	1970	July 16, 1970	1992	Series II (나)
		₩10	22.86 mm	4.22 g	Commercial bronze 88% copper 12% zinc	Plain	Dabotap Pagoda, value, bank title (hangul)	Value (digit), bank title, year of minting	1966	August 16, 1966	Still circulating	Series I (가)
		₩10	22.86 mm	4.06 g	High brass 65% copper 35% zinc	Plain	Dabotap Pagoda, value, bank title (hangul)	Value (digit), bank title, year of minting	1970	July 16, 1970	Still circulating	Series II (나)
		₩50	21.6 mm	4.16 g	70% copper 18% zinc 12% nickel	Reeded	Stalk of rice, value (hangul)	Value (digit), bank title (hangul), year of minting	1972	December 1, 1972	Still circulating	Series I (가)
		₩100	24 mm	5.42 g	Cupronickel; 75% copper 25% nickel	Reeded	Yi Sun-sin, value, bank title (hangul)	Value (digit), year of minting	1970	November 30, 1970	Still circulating	Series I (가)
These images are to scale at 2.5 pixels per millimetre. For table standards, see the coin specification table.

In 1982, with inflation and the increasing popularity of vending machines, 500 won coins were introduced on June 12, 1982. In January 1983, with the purpose of standardizing the coinage, a new series of 1, 5, 10, 50, and 100 won coins was issued, using the same layout as the 500 won coins, but conserving the coins' old themes.

1982–2006 issued coins
Image		Value	Technical parameters			Description			Date of		BOK series designation
Obverse	Reverse	Value	Diameter	Mass	Composition	Edge	Obverse	Reverse	First minting	Issue	BOK series designation
		₩1	17.2 mm	0.729 g	100% aluminium	Plain	Rose of Sharon, value (hangul)	Value (digit), bank title, year of minting	1983	January 15, 1983	Series III (다)
		₩5	20.4 mm	2.95 g	High brass 65% copper 35% zinc	Plain	Geobukseon, value (hangul)	Value (digit), bank title, year of minting	1983	January 15, 1983	Series III (다)
		₩10	22.86 mm	4.06 g	High brass 65% copper 35% zinc	Plain	Dabotap Pagoda, value (hangul)	Value (digit), bank title, year of minting	1983	January 15, 1983	Series III (다)
These images are to scale at 2.5 pixels per millimetre. For table standards, see the coin specification table.

Current coins
Image		Value	Technical parameters			Description			Date of		BOK series designation
Obverse	Reverse	Value	Diameter	Mass	Composition	Edge	Obverse	Reverse	First minting	Issue	BOK series designation
		₩10	18 mm	1.22 g	Copper-plated aluminium 48% copper 52% aluminium	Plain	Dabotap pagoda, value (hangul)	Value (digit), bank title, year of minting	2006	December 18, 2006	Series IV (라)
		₩50	21.6 mm	4.16 g	70% copper 18% zinc 12% nickel	Reeded	Stalk of rice, value (hangul)	Value (digit), bank title, year of minting	1983	January 15, 1983	Series II (나)
		₩100	24 mm	5.42 g	Cupronickel; 75% copper 25% nickel	Reeded	Yi Sun-sin, value (hangul)	Value (digit), bank title, year of minting	1983	January 15, 1983	Series II (나)
		₩500	26.5 mm	7.7 g	Cupronickel; 75% copper 25% nickel	Reeded	Red-crowned crane, value (hangul)	Value (digit), bank title, year of minting	1982	June 12, 1982	Series I (가)
These images are to scale at 2.5 pixels per millimetre. For table standards, see the coin specification table.

The Bank of Korea announced in early 2006 its intention to redesign the 10 won coin by the end of that year. With the increasing cost of production, then at 38 won per 10 won coin, and rumors that some people had been melting the coins to make jewelry, the redesign was needed to make the coin more cost-effective to produce. The new coin is made of copper-coated aluminium with a reduced diameter of 18 millimetres (0.71 in), and a weight of 1.22 grams (0.043 oz). Its visual design is the same as the old coin. The new coin was issued on December 18, 2006.

The 1 and 5 won coins are rarely in circulation since 1992, and prices of consumer goods are rounded to the nearest 10 won. However, they are still in production, minting limited amounts of these two coins every year, for the Bank of Korea's annual mint sets. In 1998, the production costs per coin were: 10 won coins each cost 35 won to produce, 100 won coins cost 58 won, and 500 won coins cost 77 won.

=== Banknotes ===
The Bank of Korea designates banknote and coin series in a unique way. Instead of putting those of similar design and issue dates in the same series, it assigns series number X to the Xth design of a given denomination. The series numbers are expressed with Korean letters used in alphabetical order, e.g. 가, 나, 다, 라, 마, 바, 사. Therefore, 1,000 won issued in 1983 is series II (나) because it is the second design of all 1,000 won designs since the introduction of the South Korean won in 1962.

In 1962, 10 and 50 jeon, 1, 5, 10, 50, 100 and 500 won notes were introduced by the Bank of Korea. The first issue of 1, 5, 10, 50, 100 and 500 won notes was printed in the UK by Thomas De La Rue. The jeon notes together with a second issue of 10 and 100 won notes were printed domestically by the Korea Minting and Security Printing Corporation.

In 1965, 100 won notes (series III) were printed using intaglio printing techniques, for the first time on domestically printed notes, to reduce counterfeiting. Replacements for the British 500 won notes followed in 1966, also using intaglio printing, and for the 50 won notes in 1969 using lithoprinting.

1962 Thomas De La Rue Series (in Korean)
Image		Value	Dimensions	Main color	Description		Date of		BOK series designation
Obverse	Reverse	Value	Dimensions	Main color	Obverse	Reverse	Issue	Issue Suspended	BOK series designation
		₩1	94 × 50 mm	Pink	Bank of Korea's symbol	Value	June 10, 1962	May 20, 1970	None
		₩5	94 × 50 mm	Blue	Bank of Korea's symbol	Value	June 10, 1962	May 1, 1969	None
		₩10	108 × 54 mm	Green	Bank of Korea's symbol	Value	June 10, 1962	September 1, 1962	Series I (가)
		₩50	156 × 66 mm	Orange	Haegeumgang near Geoje	Torch, value	June 10, 1962	May 20, 1970	Series I (가)
		₩100	156 × 66 mm	Green	Independence Gate (Dongnimmun)	Torch, value	June 10, 1962	February 14, 1969	Series I (가)
		₩500	156 × 66 mm	Grey	Namdaemun	Torch, value	June 10, 1962	February 3, 1967	Series I (가)
1962–1969 KOMSCO Series (in Korean)
		10 jeon	90 × 50 mm	Blue	"Bank of Korea" and value (Korean)	"Bank of Korea" and value (English)	December 1, 1962	December 1, 1980	None
		50 jeon	90 × 50 mm	Brown	"Bank of Korea" and value (Korean)	"Bank of Korea" and value (English)	December 1, 1962	December 1, 1980	None
		₩10	140 × 63 mm	Purple	Cheomseongdae	Geobukseon	September 21, 1962	October 30, 1973	Series II (나)
		₩50	149 × 64 mm	Green and orange / blue	Tapgol Park in Seoul	Beacon, Rose of Sharon	March 21, 1969	October 30, 1973	Series II (나)
		₩100	156 × 66 mm	Green	Independence Gate	Gyeonghoeru Pavilion at Gyeongbokgung	November 1, 1962	October 30, 1973	Series II (나)
		₩100	156 × 66 mm	Green	Sejong the Great	Main building of the Bank of Korea	August 14, 1965	December 1, 1980	Series III (다)
		₩500	165 × 73 mm	Brown	Namdaemun	Geobukseon	August 16, 1966	May 10, 1975	Series II (나)
These images are to scale at 0.7 pixel per millimetre (18 pixel per inch). For table standards, see the banknote specification table.

With the economic development from the 1960s, the value of the 500 won notes fell, resulting in a greater use of cashier's checks with higher fixed denominations as means of payment, as well as an increased use of counterfeited ones. In 1970, the 100 won notes were replaced by coins, with the same happening to the 50 won notes in 1972.

Higher-denomination notes of 5,000 and 10,000 won were introduced in 1972 and 1973, respectively. The notes incorporated new security features, including watermark, security thread, and ultraviolet response fibres, and were intaglio printed. The release of 10,000 won notes was planned to be at the same time as the 5,000 won notes, but problems with the main theme delayed it by a year. Newly designed 500 won notes were also released in 1973, and the need for a medium denomination resulted in the introduction of 1,000 won notes in 1975.

1972–1973 Series (in Korean)
Image		Value	Dimensions	Main color	Description			Date of		BOK series designation	Plate produced
Obverse	Reverse	Value	Dimensions	Main color	Obverse	Reverse	Watermark	Issue	Issue Suspended	BOK series designation	Plate produced
		₩5,000	167 × 77 mm	Brown	Yi I	Main building of the Bank of Korea		July 1, 1972	December 1, 1980	Series I (가)	By Thomas de la Rue
		₩10,000	171 × 81 mm	Green	Sejong the Great, Rose of Sharon	Geunjeongjeon at Gyeongbok Palace		June 12, 1973	November 10, 1981	Series I (가)	In Japan
1973–1979 Series (in Korean)
		₩500	159 × 69 mm	Green and pink	Yi Sun-sin, Geobukseon	Yi Sun-sin's Shrine at Hyeonchungsa	None	September 1, 1973	May 12, 1993	Series III (다)	
		₩1,000	163 × 73 mm	Purple	Yi Hwang, Rose of Sharon	Dosan Seowon (Dosan Confucian Academy)		August 14, 1975	May 12, 1993	Series I (가)	In Japan
		₩5,000	167 × 77 mm	Orange	Yi I	Ojukheon in Gangneung		June 1, 1977	May 12, 1993	Series II (나)	In Japan
		₩10,000	171 × 81 mm	Green	Sejong the Great, Water clock	Gyeonghoeru Pavilion at Gyeongbok Palace, Rose of Sharon		June 15, 1979	May 12, 1993	Series II (나)	In Japan
These images are to scale at 0.7 pixel per millimetre (18 pixel per inch). For table standards, see the banknote specification table.

In 1982, the 500 won note was replaced by a coin. The following year, as part of its policy of rationalizing the currency system, the Bank of Korea issued a new set of notes, as well as a new set of coins. Some of the notes' most notable features were distinguishable marks for the blind under the watermark and the addition of machine-readable language in preparation for mechanization of cash handling. They were also printed on better-quality cotton pulp to reduce the production costs by extending their circulation life.

To cope with the deregulation of imports of color printers and the increasing use of computers and scanners, modified 5,000 and 10,000 won notes were released between 1994 and 2002 with various new security features, which included color-shifting ink, microprint, segmented metal thread, moiré, and EURion constellation. The latest version of the 5,000 and 10,000 won notes are easily identifiable by the copyright information inscribed under the watermark: "© 한국은행" and year of issue on the obverse, "© The Bank of Korea" and year of issue on the reverse.

The plates for the 5,000 won notes were produced in Japan, while the ones for the 1,000 and 10,000 won notes were produced by the Korea Minting and Security Printing Corporation. They were all printed in intaglio.

1983–2002 Series (in Korean)
Image		Value	Dimensions	Main Color	Description			Date of issue	Suspended Date	BOK series designation	Modification
Obverse	Reverse	Value	Dimensions	Main Color	Obverse	Reverse	Watermark	Date of issue	Suspended Date	BOK series designation	Modification
		₩1,000	151 × 76 mm	Purple	Yi Hwang	Dosan Seowon (Dosan Confucian Academy)	Reversed portrait	June 11, 1983	June 1, 2016	Series II (나)	
		₩5,000	156 × 76 mm	Orange	Yi I	Ojukheon in Gangneung	Reversed portrait	June 11, 1983	June 1, 2016	Series III (다)	
		₩5,000	156 × 76 mm	Orange	Yi I	Ojukheon in Gangneung	Reversed portrait	June 12, 2002	June 1, 2016	Series IV (라)	Color-shifting ink on the dots for blinds, segmented metal thread, copyright inscription
		₩10,000	161 × 76 mm	Green	Sejong the Great, Water clock	Gyeonghoeru Pavilion at Gyeongbok Palace	Reversed portrait	October 8, 1983	June 1, 2016	Series III (다)	
		₩10,000	161 × 76 mm	Green	Sejong the Great, Water clock	Gyeonghoeru Pavilion at Gyeongbok Palace	Reversed portrait	January 20, 1994	June 1, 2016	Series IV (라)	Segmented metal thread, microprint under the water clock, moiré on watermark area, intaglio latent image
		₩10,000	161 × 76 mm	Green	Sejong the Great, Water clock	Gyeonghoeru Pavilion at Gyeongbok Palace	Reversed portrait, Taeguk	June 19, 2000	June 1, 2016	Series V (마)	Color-shifting ink on the dots for blinds, removal of moiré, EURion constellation, copyright inscription
These images are to scale at 0.7 pixel per millimetre (18 pixel per inch). For table standards, see the banknote specification table.

== New security features ==
In 2006, it became a major concern that the South Korean won banknotes were being counterfeited. This led the government to issue a new series of banknotes, with the 5,000 won note being the first one to be redesigned. Later in 2007, the 1,000 and 10,000 won notes were introduced.

On June 23, 2009, the Bank of Korea released the 50,000 won note. The obverse bears a portrait of Shin Saimdang, a prominent 16th-century artist, calligrapher, and mother of Korean scholar Yulgok, also known as Yi I, who is on the 5,000 won note. This note is the first Korean banknote to feature the portrait of a woman. The release of the 50,000 won note stirred some controversy among shop owners and those with visual impairments due to its similarity in color and numerical denomination with the 5,000 won note.

New 100,000 won notes were also announced, but their release was later cancelled due to the controversy over the banknote's planned image, featuring the Daedongyeojido map, and not including the disputed Dokdo islands. Also of controversy was the appearance of Kim Ku on the note, who is controversial among the South Korean right.

The banknotes include over 10 security features in each denomination. The 50,000 won note has 22 security features, the 10,000 won note 21, the 5,000 won note 17, the 2,000 won note 10 and the 1,000 won note 19. Many modern security features that can be also found in euros, pounds, Canadian dollars, and Japanese yen are included in the banknotes. Some security features inserted in won notes are:

- Holograms with three-dimensional images that change colors within the metallic foil on the obverse side of the notes (except ₩1,000)
- Watermark portraits of the effigy of the note are visible when held to the light in the white section of the note.
- Intaglio printing on words and the effigy give off a raised feeling, different from ordinary paper
- Security thread in the right side of the obverse side of the note with small lettering "한국은행 Bank of Korea" and its corresponding denomination
- Color-shifting ink on the value number at the back of the note:

For the first time in the world, KOMSCO, the Korean mint, inserted a new substance in the notes to detect counterfeits. This technique is being exported, such as to Europe and North America.

2006 Series (in Korean)
Image		Value	Dimensions	Main color	Description			Date of issue	BOK series designation
Obverse	Reverse	Value	Dimensions	Main color	Obverse	Reverse	Watermark	Date of issue	BOK series designation
		₩1,000	136 × 68 mm	Blue	Yi Hwang, Myeongryundang in Seonggyungwan, plum flowers	"Gyesangjeonggeodo"; a painting Yi Hwang in Dosan Seowon by Jeong Seon	Reversed portrait and electrotype denomination (₩1,000 to ₩50,000)	January 22, 2007	Series III (다)
		₩5,000	142 × 68 mm	Orange	Yi I, Ojukheon in Gangneung, black bamboo	"Insects and Plants", a painting of a watermelon and cockscombs by Yi I's mother Shin Saimdang	Reversed portrait and electrotype denomination (₩1,000 to ₩50,000)	January 2, 2006	Series V (마)
		₩10,000	148 × 68 mm	Green	Sejong the Great, Irworobongdo, a folding screen for Joseon-era kings, and text from the second chapter of Yongbieocheonga, the first work of literature written in hangul	Globe of Honcheonsigye, Cheonsang Yeolcha Bunyajido C14 star map and reflecting telescope at Bohyeonsan Observatory in the background	Reversed portrait and electrotype denomination (₩1,000 to ₩50,000)	January 22, 2007	Series VI (바)
		₩50,000	154 × 68 mm	Yellow	Shin Saimdang with Chochungdo - a Folding Screen of Embroidered Plants and Insects (South Korean National Treasure No. 595) in the background	Bamboo and a plum tree	Reversed portrait and electrotype denomination (₩1,000 to ₩50,000)	June 23, 2009	Series I (가)
These images are to scale at 0.7 pixel per millimetre (18 pixel per inch). For table standards, see the banknote specification table.

2017 Commemorative Series (in Korean)
Image		Value	Dimensions	Main color	Description			Date of issue	BOK series designation
Obverse	Reverse	Value	Dimensions	Main color	Obverse	Reverse	Watermark	Date of issue	BOK series designation
		₩2,000	140 x 75 mm	Gray	Seven winter sports events (Biathlon, Ice hockey, Curling, Speed skating, Ski jumping, Luge and Bobsled)	Songhamaenghodo (a painting of a tiger and a pine tree by Joseon-era artist Kim Hong-do)	Pyeongchang Olympic Stadium	November 17, 2017	Series I (가)
These images are to scale at 0.7 pixel per millimetre (18 pixel per inch). For table standards, see the banknote specification table.

== Future ==
=== Coinless trials ===
As the South Korean economy is evolving through the use of electronic payments, coins of the South Korean won are becoming less used by consumers. The Bank of Korea began a trial which would result in the total cessation of the production of coins by depositing change into prepaid cards. As of 2019, however, public participation in this program has decreased.

=== Redenomination proposals ===
There have been recurring proposals in the South Korean National Assembly to redenominate the won by introducing a new won or new unit, equal to 1,000 old won, and worth nearly one U.S. dollar. While proponents cite a more valuable currency unit better projects the strength of the nation's economy, a majority remain opposed to the idea. Reasons cited are: economic harm if done immediately, no issues on public confidence in the won and its inflation rate, limited cost savings, and the presence of more urgent economic issues.

== Currency production ==
The Bank of Korea is the only institution in South Korea with the right to print banknotes and mint coins. The banknotes and coins are printed at the KOMSCO, a government-owned corporation, under the guidance of the Bank of Korea. After the new banknotes and coins are minted, they are bundled or rolled and shipped to the headquarters of the Bank of Korea. When delivered, they are deposited inside the bank's vault, ready to be distributed to commercial banks when requested. Every year, around Seollal and Chuseok, two major Korean holidays, the Bank of Korea distributes large amounts of its currency to most of the commercial banks in South Korea, which are then given to their customers upon request.

== Current exchange rates ==
South Korean won exchange rate against U.S. dollar (from 1990) and Euro (from 1999).

== Ranking ==
Most traded currencies by value Currency distribution of global foreign exchange market turnover
Currency	ISO 4217 code	Proportion of daily volume		Change (2022–2025)
Currency	ISO 4217 code	April 2022	April 2025	Change (2022–2025)
United States dollar	USD	88.4%	89.2%	▲0.8pp
Euro	EUR	30.6%	28.9%	▼1.7pp
Japanese yen	JPY	16.7%	16.8%	▲0.1pp
Pound sterling	GBP	12.9%	10.2%	▼2.7pp
Renminbi	CNY	7.0%	8.5%	▲1.5pp
Swiss franc	CHF	5.2%	6.4%	▲1.2pp
Australian dollar	AUD	6.4%	6.1%	▼0.3pp
Canadian dollar	CAD	6.2%	5.8%	▼0.4pp
Hong Kong dollar	HKD	2.6%	3.8%	▲1.2pp
Singapore dollar	SGD	2.4%	2.4%	Steady
Indian rupee	INR	1.6%	1.9%	▲0.3pp
South Korean won	KRW	1.8%	1.8%	Steady
Swedish krona	SEK	2.2%	1.6%	▼0.6pp
Mexican peso	MXN	1.5%	1.6%	▲0.1pp
New Zealand dollar	NZD	1.7%	1.5%	▼0.2pp
Norwegian krone	NOK	1.7%	1.3%	▼0.4pp
New Taiwan dollar	TWD	1.1%	1.2%	▲0.1pp
Brazilian real	BRL	0.9%	0.9%	Steady
South African rand	ZAR	1.0%	0.8%	▼0.2pp
Polish złoty	PLN	0.7%	0.8%	▲0.1pp
Danish krone	DKK	0.7%	0.7%	Steady
Indonesian rupiah	IDR	0.4%	0.7%	▲0.3pp
Turkish lira	TRY	0.4%	0.5%	▲0.1pp
Thai baht	THB	0.4%	0.5%	▲0.1pp
Israeli new shekel	ILS	0.4%	0.4%	Steady
Hungarian forint	HUF	0.3%	0.4%	▲0.1pp
Czech koruna	CZK	0.4%	0.4%	Steady
Chilean peso	CLP	0.3%	0.3%	Steady
Philippine peso	PHP	0.2%	0.2%	Steady
Colombian peso	COP	0.2%	0.2%	Steady
Malaysian ringgit	MYR	0.2%	0.2%	Steady
UAE dirham	AED	0.4%	0.1%	▼0.3pp
Saudi riyal	SAR	0.2%	0.1%	▼0.1pp
Romanian leu	RON	0.1%	0.1%	Steady
Peruvian sol	PEN	0.1%	0.1%	Steady
Other currencies		2.6%	3.4%	▲0.8pp
Total (Note: The total sum is 200% because each currency trade is counted twice: once for the currency being bought and once for the currency being sold. The percentages above represent the proportion of all trades involving a given currency, regardless of which side of the transaction it is on.)		200.0%	200.0%	

Current KRW exchange rates
From Google Finance:	AUD CAD CHF CNY EUR GBP HKD JPY USD
From Yahoo! Finance:	AUD CAD CHF CNY EUR GBP HKD JPY USD
From XE.com:	AUD CAD CHF CNY EUR GBP HKD JPY USD
From OANDA:	AUD CAD CHF CNY EUR GBP HKD JPY USD

== See also ==
- Economy of South Korea
- Korean currency
- North Korean won

== Notes ==
Preceded by: Korean yen Ratio: at par	Currency of South Korea; 1945 – 1953	Succeeded by: South Korean hwan Reason: inflation Ratio: 1 hwan = 100 won
Preceded by: South Korean hwan Reason: inflation Ratio: 1 won = 10 hwan	Currency of South Korea; 1962 –	Succeeded by: Current
