= Lee Ju-yeol =

South Korean economist (born 1952)

- 이주열
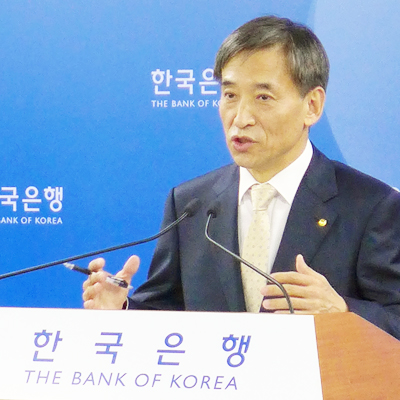
- Lee Ju-yeol in 2014

25th & 26th Governor of the Bank of Korea
- In office 1 April 2014 – 31 March 2022
- Appointed by: Park Geun-hye
- Preceded by: Kim Choong-soo
- Succeeded by: Rhee Chang-yong

Personal details
- Born: 24 July 1952 (age 74) Jeongseon, Gangwon Province, South Korea
- Education: Yonsei University (BA); Pennsylvania State University (MA)
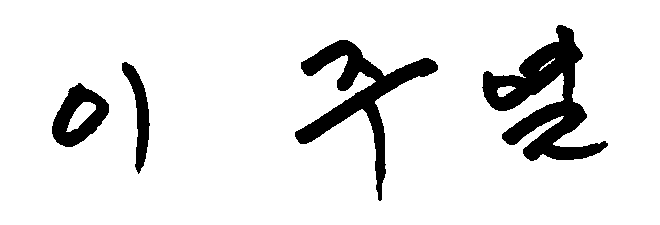
- Signature

Korean name
- Hangul: 이주열
- Hanja: 李柱烈
- RR: I Juyeol
- MR: I Chuyŏl

Lee Ju-yeol (Korean: 이주열; born 24 July 1952) is a South Korean economist and technocrat who served as the 25th and 26th governor of the Bank of Korea, the South Korean central bank, from 2014 to 2022. He was re-nominated for the governorship by President Moon Jae-in and the nomination was confirmed by the National Assembly, thus renewing his governorship to March 2022 and becoming the first central bank Governor to be appointed for a second term throughout the history of the nation. He also serves as the Alternate Governor representing South Korea on the IMF Board.

Lee received his BA in Business Management from Yonsei University in 1977 and MA in Economics from Pennsylvania State University in 1988. He first worked at the Bank of Korea in 1977 and served as Senior Deputy Governor from 2009 to 2012. After finishing his term as Governor of the Bank of Korea, he retired to work as an Economics professor at Yonsei University.

Lee is married and has a son and a daughter.
