= Rhee Chang-yong =

South Korean economist (born 1960)

- 이창용
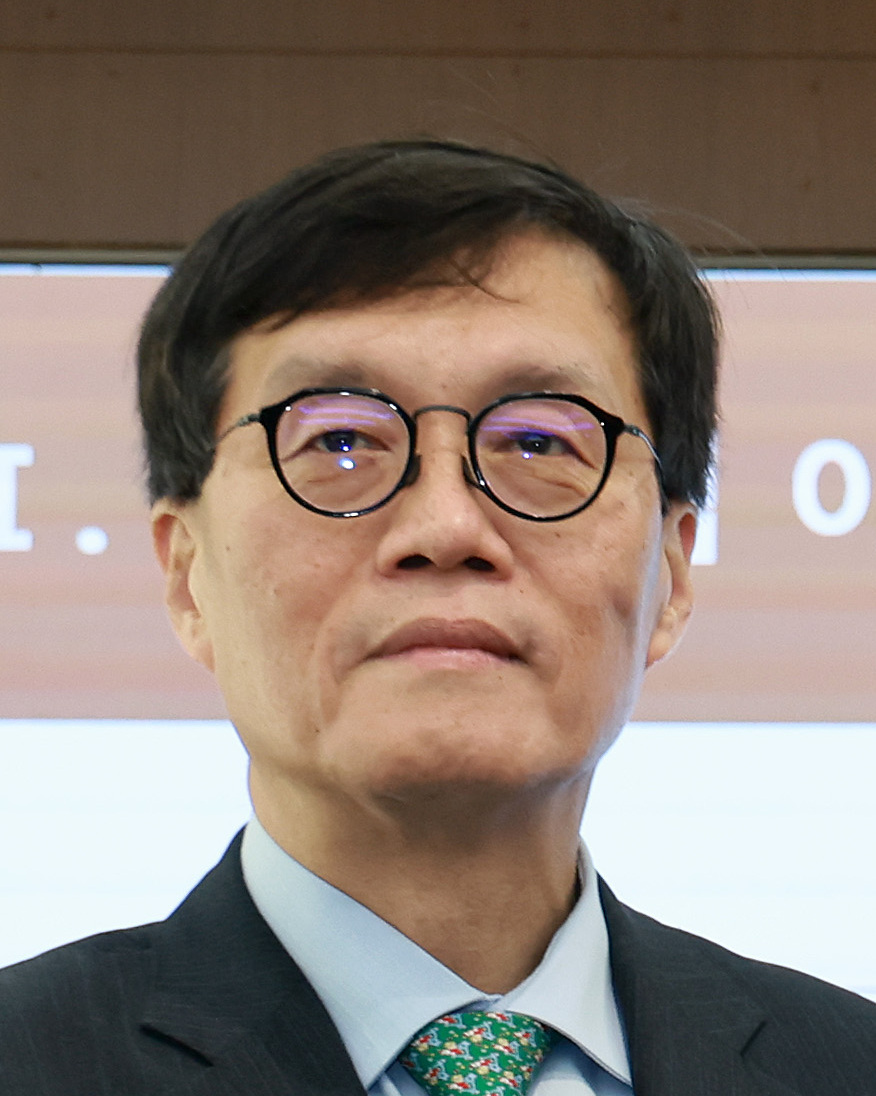
- Rhee in 2024

27th Governor of the Bank of Korea
- In office 21 April 2022 – 20 April 2026
- Appointed by: Moon Jae-in
- Preceded by: Lee Ju-yeol
- Succeeded by: Hyun Song Shin

Personal details
- Born: 16 May 1960 (age 66) Nonsan, South Korea
- Education: Seoul National University (BA); Harvard University (PhD)

Academic background
- Doctoral advisor: Lawrence Summers

Academic work
- Discipline: Macroeconomics
- Institutions: Seoul National University; University of Rochester

Rhee Chang-yong (Korean: 이창용; Hanja: 李昌鏞; born 16 May 1960) is a South Korean economist who served as the 27th governor of the Bank of Korea, from April 2022 to April 2026.

== Early life and education ==
Rhee was born in Nonsan, South Korea, in 1960.

He holds two degrees in economics - a bachelor's from Seoul National University and a doctorate from Harvard University. He completed a doctorate in 1989 at the Harvard University, with Lawrence Summers as his advisor. After his doctoral studies, Rhee taught at economics departments at University of Rochester and Seoul National University.

== Early career ==
Prior to moving to the IMF as the first South Korean to join its senior leadership, Rhee was the chief economist at the Asian Development Bank, where he worked as its spokesperson and head of its Economic and Research Department. Before joining inter-governmental organisations, he first served as an advisor to multiple South Korean government organisations on economic policies from the early 2000s, and then joined the transition team of then-president-elect Lee Myung-bak in 2007. Following President Lee's restructuring of government entities, Rhee took the first deputy role of the Financial Services Commission from 2008 to 2009, before joining the Presidential Committee for the 2010 G-20 Seoul Summit as its secretary-general and sherpa.

== Governor of the Bank of Korea ==
In March 2022, President Moon Jae-in tapped Rhee, who had led the Asia and Pacific Department at the International Monetary Fund over eight years for the country's top monetary policy chief, upon recommendations from president-elect Yoon Suk Yeol. On 19 April, a nomination hearing was held at the National Assembly, where his nomination report was adopted and sent to the president. President Moon appointed Rhee on the following day, commencing his four-year term as the governor, to minimise the first-ever vacancy of the governor in the bank's history.

During the nomination hearing, Rhee vowed to utilise the central bank's "unpopular" tool of base rate to address post-pandemic inflation reiterating the organisation's role in price stabilisation.

On April 18, 2024, Rhee attended the G20 Meeting of Finance Ministers and Central Bank Governors in Washington, D.C. and the International Monetary Fund-World Bank Group (WBG) Spring Conference. On April 21, the meeting period, he was selected as the winner of the American Foreign Policy Association's medal, and would participate in the ceremony.

On April 20, 2026, Rhee finished his term as the governor of the Bank of Korea.

== Honours ==
- Order of Civil Merit by the government of South Korea (2011)
