= Ducksun Yoon =

Ducksun Yoon (尹德善, 1921–1996) was a South Korean medical doctor and educator. His pen name is Ilsong (一松). His life can be divided into three periods; the first period when he was a medical student (1921–1944); the second period when he was active both as doctor and educator (1945–1967); the last period in which he dedicated himself mainly to the management of medical and educational institutions (1968–1996).

== Medical student ==
Yoon was born in Yonggang-gun, Pyeongannam-do, He graduated from Pyongyang Public High School in 1938 and Gyeongseong Medical College in 1942. After graduation, he worked as a surgeon's mate at the Gyeongseong Medical College Hospital, while at the same time, serving as a surgical resident under Paik Injae at Paikinjae Surgery (now Seoul Paik Hospital).

== Doctor and educator ==
Yoon began his medical career with the openings of the Sacred Heart Hospital, at Yonggang in Pyeongan-do in 1945 and the Sacred Heart Hospital at Hongseong in South Chungcheong Province in 1948. During the Korean War, he participated in the reconstruction of Paik Hospital together with Dr. Huigyu Kim and Dr. Nakhwan Paik, and he played a leading role in founding a blood bank as he was working for the field hospital of the 24th Division of the US Army. His experience at this time convinced him of the need of advanced medical skills, so he went abroad and studied at Bridgeport Hospital in the U.S. from July, 1954 to August, 1956. Upon returning to South Korea, he started his new post as associate professor of the Faculty of Medicine at Songsin University (now the School of Medicine at the Catholic University of Korea) in August, 1956. Later, he became assistant dean of the Faculty of Medicine at the Catholic University of Korea, School of Medicine and the vice-director of St. Mary's Hospital.

== Manager of medical and educational institutions ==
Yoon began his career of professional medical management by serving as chairman of the board of the Sacred Heart Medical Foundation in April, 1974. In 1976, he ran on commission as vice-director of the Mariana Medical Center on American Guam. Domestically, he dedicated himself primarily to expanding medical service while running Hangang Sacred Heart Hospital established in 1971 and further opening Kangnam Sacred Hospital in 1980, Chuncheon Sacred Heart Hospital in 1984, and Kangdong Sacred Hospital in 1986.

In addition to managing various institutions, Yoon also put in a great deal of effort to train talent in the field of medicine. He took over the campus of the Sacred Heart Women's College in Chuncheon in 1981, and established the Ilsong Education Foundation in January, 1982, serving as its first chairman of the board of the trustees. Hallym College, established in March of the same year, rapidly grew to become a university in 1989. After retiring from the chairmanship in 1989 and then serving as honorary chairman, Yoon founded Hallym Academy of Sciences in 1990, and served as chairman of its steering committee, devoting himself to fostering basic sciences.
