= Kim Choong-soo =

South Korean economist (born 1947)

- 김중수
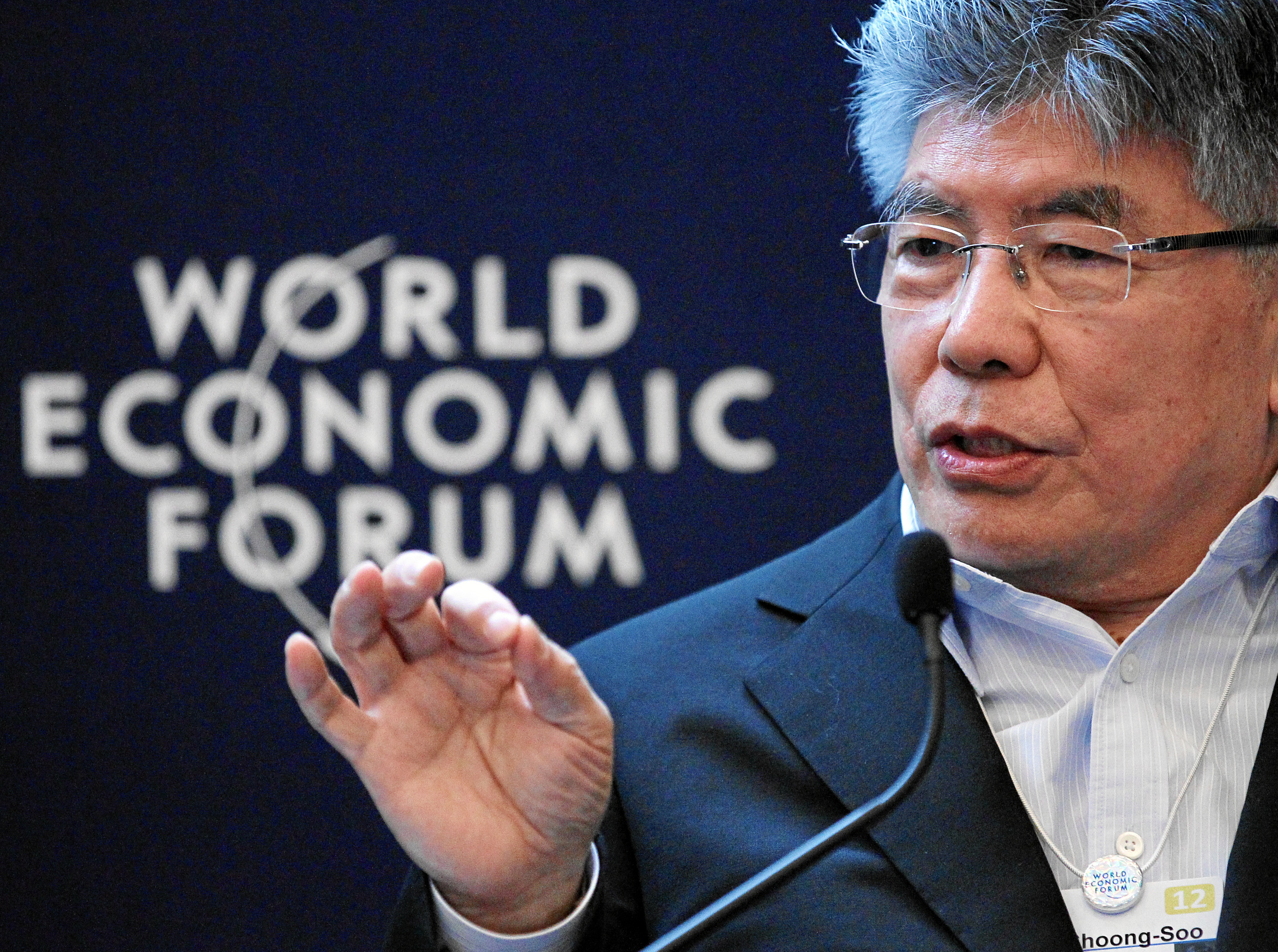
- Kim at the World Economic Forum annual meeting in 2012

24th Governor of the Bank of Korea
- In office April 1, 2010 – March 31, 2014
- Preceded by: Lee Seong-tae
- Succeeded by: Lee Ju-yeol

Personal details
- Born: 6 June 1947 (age 79) Seoul, southern Korea
- Occupation: Economist; politician
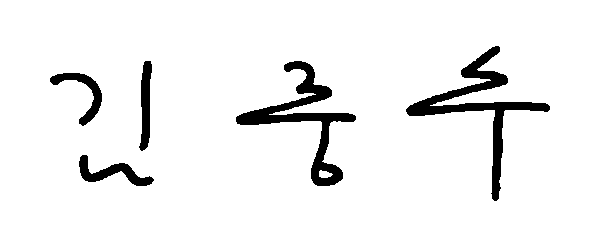
- Signature

Korean name
- Hangul: 김중수
- Hanja: 金仲秀
- RR: Gim Jungsu
- MR: Kim Chungsu

Kim Choong-soo (Korean: 김중수; born 6 June 1947) is a South Korean economist and politician who was Governor of the Bank of Korea from April 2010 until March 2014.

== Education ==
After graduating from Kyunggi High School in Seoul in 1966, he entered Seoul National University and graduated with a degree in economics in 1973. He received a PhD degree in economics from the University of Pennsylvania, US in 1979.

== Career ==
In 1979, he started his professional career as Senior Research Associate at the Center for Human Resource Research, Ohio State University, U.S.A. He returned to Korea in 1983 and served at the Korea Development Institute (KDI) as Senior Economist for ten years. His research areas at KDI included macroeconomic policy management, manpower and social welfare policy. In early 1993, Kim was named Secretary to the President for Economic Affairs at the Office of the President. In March 1995, as Korea applied for a membership to the OECD, he was appointed as Minister and Head of the OECD Office at the Korean Embassy in Paris, to be in charge of the accession negotiations with the OECD.

Kim returned to Seoul in early 1997 and served as Assistant Minister and Special Advisor to the Deputy Prime Minister at the Ministry of Finance and Economy. In August 1997, he was elected as President of the Korea Institute of Public Finance. He became Dean of the graduate school for international studies at Kyung Hee University in April 1998. From August 2002 to August 2005, he served as President of the Korea Development Institute. During February 2007 and February 2008, he served as President of Hallym University.

From February to June 2008, he was Senior Secretary to the President for Economic Affairs at the Office of the President of the Republic of Korea.

Before becoming the Governor of the Bank of Korea in April 2010, he served as Ambassador and Permanent Representative of Korea to the OECD from September 2008 to March 2010, as well as serving as the head of Korea's state-run think-tank Korea Development Institute. His tenure as Governor ended on 31 March 2014.

== Criticism ==
In March 2010, economist expert, Dr. Kim Sang-jo (김상조) of Hansung University criticized Kim Choong-soo as "the worst candidate for the new governor of Bank of Korea" due to his close affiliation with President Lee Myung-bak that could threaten the neutrality of Bank of Korea.

== Awards ==
- Order of Civil Merit, Mogryeon, 26 December 1992
- Civil Merit Medal, 15 December 1987
