= Bank of Korea =

Central bank of South Korea

Bank of Korea 한국은행

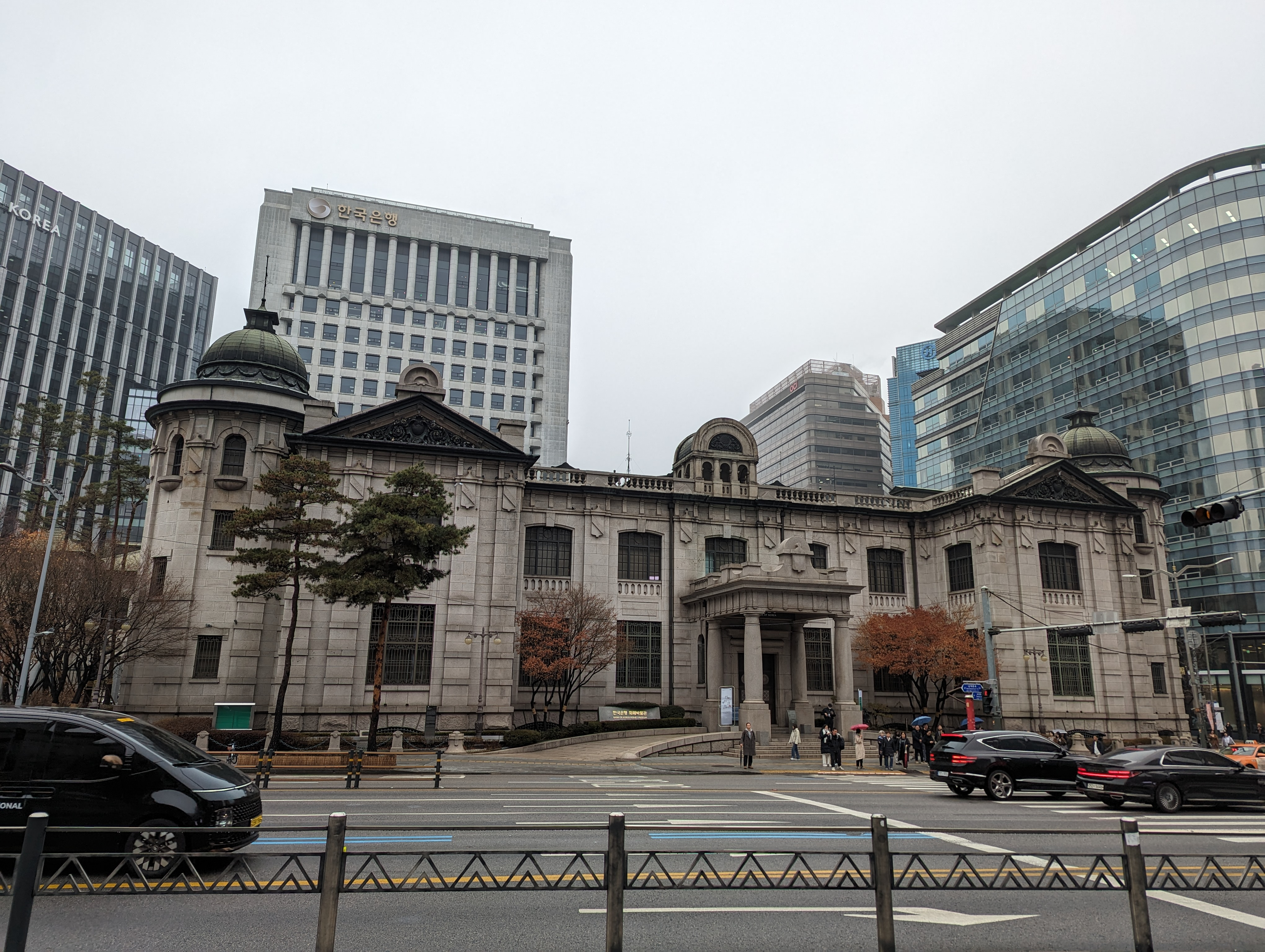
- Headquarters in Seoul
- Central bank of: South Korea
- Headquarters: Seoul, South Korea
- Established: 12 June 1950; 76 years ago
- Ownership: Government of South Korea
- Governor: Hyun Song Shin
- Currency: South Korean won KRW (ISO 4217)
- Reserves: US$374 billion
- Interest rate target: 2.50%
- Website: bok.or.kr

Korean name
- Hangul: 한국은행
- Hanja: 韓國銀行
- RR: Hanguk eunhaeng
- MR: Han'guk ŭnhaeng

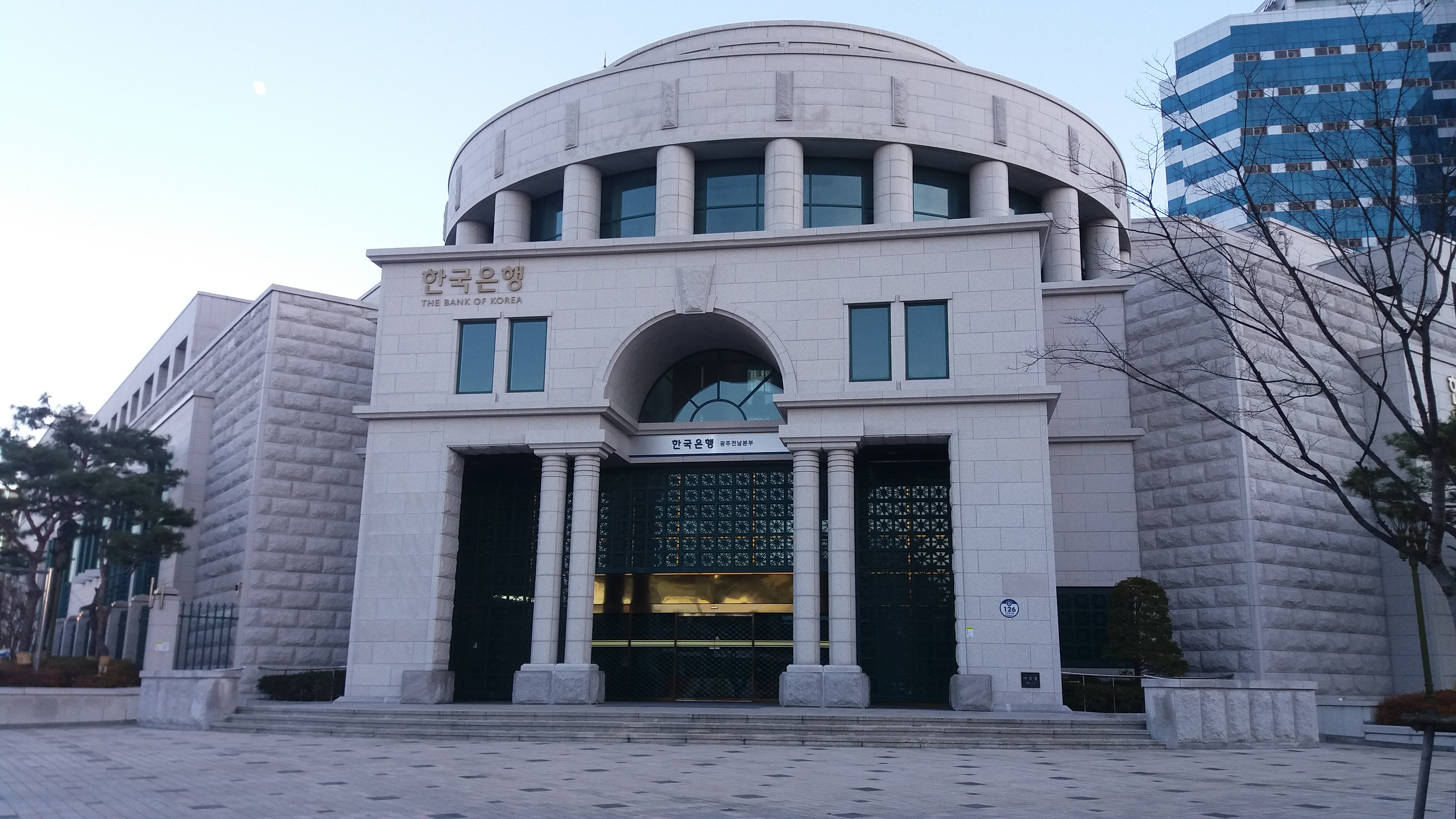
The bank of Korea Gwangju and Jeonnam Bureau

The Bank of Korea (BOK; Korean: 한국은행) is the central bank of South Korea and issuer of South Korean won. It was established on 12 June 1950 in Seoul, South Korea.

== History ==
=== 1950–1970 ===
Bank of Korea logo used from 1950 to 2010

The Bank of Korea was established on 12 June 1950 under the Bank of Korea Act passed of 5 May 1950, taking over assets and operations from the simultaneously liquidated Bank of Chōsen. It was given a wide range of functions in relation to monetary and financial policy, banking supervision, and foreign exchange policy.

The Korean War began only thirteen days after the bank was created, forcing the Head Office to relocate to Daejon, Daegu and Busan. It returned to Seoul after the Incheon landings. The bank's 89 boxes of silver and gold bullion was moved by the military to the Jinhae naval station and then given to the New York Federal Reserve Bank to pay for South Korea's entry into the IMF and International Bank of Reconstruction and Development in 1955. The first Bank of Korea notes circulated after June 1950 alongside older notes of the Bank of Chōsen, which were flooded into the market by North Korean forces. To stop a liquidity crisis during the war, the bank instituted a limit on withdrawals of ₩10,000 per week and ₩30,000 per month for households. It also tried to fight inflation with a Maximum Loan Ceiling System in January, 1951 which set quarterly caps on the increase in general loans and required prior approval for special or general purpose loans exceeding 50 million won. The bank repaid $470 million in aid from the UN Korean Reconstruction Agency and Economic Cooperation Administration beginning in 1952.

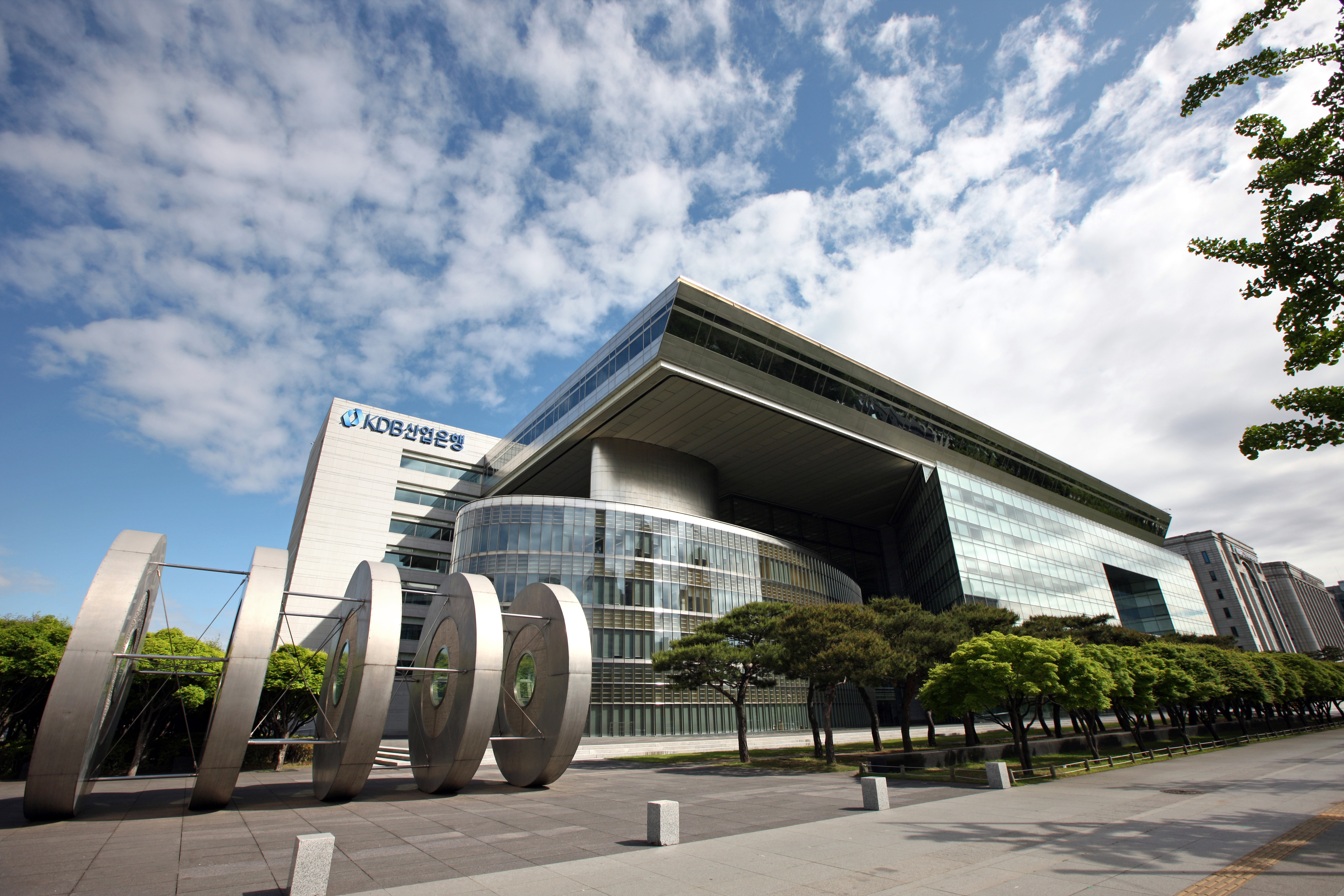
Headquarter of KDB

After the Korean War, inflation remained high with a 48 percent annual increase in wholesale prices in Seoul from 1954 to 1956. The Korea Development Bank (KDB) was created on April 1, 1954 to rebuild the country, taking over former operations of the Japanese-era Chōsen Industrial Bank, but faced opposition from the Bank of Korea which saw it as a threat to centralization under the control of the Minister of Finance. The Bank of Korea underwrote and absorbed five billion hwan of Industrial Rehabilitation Bonds to finance the KDB. Continuing its bid to rein in inflation, the Bank of Korea set credit ceilings, a loan priority system and loan prior approvals. Interest rate policies and reserve requirements of 15 to 30 percent were widely used. In January 1954, the bank dropped reserve requirements to 15 percent to make funds more available, but then raised it back to 25 percent and ultimately dropped to as low as 10 percent by April 1957.

The Korea-US Joint Economic Committee put in place the Fiscal and Monetary Stabilization Plan in 1957. It restricted defense spending and loans and in 1958 instituted education taxes. South Korea had bumper rice harvests and grain prices dropped with surplus agricultural products from the US. The General Banking Act created in 1950 only came into effect in the late 1950s. It focused on privatizing the banking sector and creating regional banks, such as Seoul Bank or Hungop Bank, and encouraged banks to close down branches that were losing money.

When the Democratic Party took power in 1960 after the April 19 Revolution, they pursued fiscal austerity and ended up with significant financial surpluses. The preferential financing system was eliminated and the bank abolished its rediscount ceiling, although quarterly credit ceilings were reimposed. The new government centralized foreign exchange rates and steeply depreciated the hwan relative to the dollar from 500-600 hwan to the dollar to 1,300 from January to February, 1960. Citizens were required to sell their foreign currency through the Bank of Korea.

Following a year of economic stagnation, the May 16 coup led to massive bank runs. The government revised the budget three times in 1961 pursuing an expansionary approach. Money demand dropped by the third quarter and as a result commercial banks had large reserves. On November 1, the government added Monetary Stabilization Bonds with no holding limits on risk-weighted assets and credit ceilings. The bank drew up the first Five-Year Economic Development Plan in 1961. The government took a much more hands on approach to monetary policy, stripping the Bank of Korea's Monetary Policy Committee of many of its previous powers. The government took over control of commercial banks. Meanwhile, the Korea Stock Exchange became a joint stock corporation and witnessed significant speculation which was resolved when the bank financed 38 billion hwan to fund a delivery settlement. In 1962, the hwan was replaced with the won at one-tenth its value. Through 1963, a poor harvest, declining US aid and depletion of foreign currency reserves to pay for imports steeply devalued the won.

Concerned about balance of payments and a high rate of imports, the government instituted a floating exchange rate in 1965 that depreciated the won, increasing exports 37 percent while decreasing imports. Interest rates were rationalized and increased from 20 percent to 36.5 percent. Into 1966, the bank abolished credit ceilings but raised reserve requirements. 1967 marked the reestablishment of regional private banks such as Busan Bank and Daegu Bank.

In November 1969, the government tried to "cool off" the economy which had grown at over 10 percent annually, but had soaring prices and current account deficits, by imposing lending and rediscount ceilings.

=== 1970s ===
The economy faced a slowdown with inflation and current account deficits tied to the 1973 fuel crisis. Between 1974 and 1976 it created the National Investment Fund and the Export-Import Bank of Korea to finance chemical and heavy industry. Although the country benefited from a late 1970s construction boom in the Middle East, inflation remained high. The August 3 Emergency Economic Measure in 1972 lowered banks' lending rates. The National Investment Fund Act served to finance its growing industrial base.

=== 1980s ===
The annual growth rate dropped from 9 percent to 7.1 percent due to the rise in raw material costs worldwide with the 1979 energy crisis. In 1980, the won was devalued and then left to have a floating exchange rate. Between June and December, three stimulus packages were created setting a 25 percent increase in the money supply growth target, but the economy registered negative growth and 30 percent inflation.

The government implemented zero-based budgeting in 1983 and the bank tightened the money supply through the mid-1980s. The fiscal tightening brought sustained growth and reined in raw material prices. The Long-Term Plan for Capital Market Internationalization in 1981 granted foreigners an opportunity to make direct investments in the domestic securities market. Between 1982 and 1983, non-bank financial institutions such as mutual savings, an investment trust company and short-term financing groups were allowed to open up. Foreigners were allowed partial equity stakes in domestic companies after August, 1989 and banks exchange rates were liberalized a month later under pressure from the US to let the won appreciate.

The 1980s were also a major time for sponsoring technology, with a 10 tax deduction on technology research and development costs as well as the creation of the Korea Technology Development Corporation to offer venture capital.

=== 1990s ===
Prices rose in the early 1990s and current account shifted to a deficit due to high oil prices worldwide. The government created the Five-Year Plan for a New Economy, a transportation tax and a tax for rural development and liberalized interest rates. Financial transactions were required to be carried out with real names. Foreign investors were allowed to invest directly in the Korea Stock Exchange, raised the ceiling on overseas portfolio investment and deregulated overseas direct investment. The 1997 East Asian financial crisis was compounded by insolvency issues at Kia Motors. Market liquidity dried up as banks refused to lend and major Korean firms such as the Hanbo Group declared bankruptcy. The bond market was opened to foreign investors in 1998 and credit cards were deregulated. The IMF, the US and Japan extended $58 billion to South Korea in financial aid. Banks had to submit Business Normalization Plans and Korea First Bank and Seoul Bank were recapitalized by the Korea Deposit Insurance Corporation. The Bank of Korea purchased two trillion won of bonds in the Non-Performing Asset Resolution Fund to restructure financial institutions.

=== 21st century ===
Deregulation of credit cards led to significant lending after 1999 and a high delinquency ratio, which kicked off a financial crisis when an accounting scandal was revealed at SK Global on March 11, 2003. The Bank of Korea launched a short-term liquidity of two trillion won in repurchase agreements to prevent the crisis from spreading. Housing prices rose steadily after 2001 due to deregulation and increased liquidity. In Seoul, prices rose 30.7 percent in 2002 alone. Foreigners owned 43.9 percent of Korean stocks. During the 2008 financial crisis, kicked off the US Federal Reserve raising interest rates in 2006 (after a period of low interest rates globally since the early 2000s) resulting in foreclosures. The Bank of Korea injected liquidity and lowered its base rates.

In 2013 Suh Young-kyung was appointed as the first female executive in the history of the bank; she was appointed as a deputy governor.

The 2016–18 target [of price stability] is with a consumer price inflation of 2.0%.

On Apr. 17, 2024, the Bank of Korea froze its key interest rate at 2.75% per annum. The decision was made due to U.S. tariff policies. With growth forecasts likely to be lower than 1.5% this year, the Monetary Policy Committee said it is likely to cut rates once in the next three months.

In February 2026, the Bank of Korea introduced a new form of forward guidance modelled on the Federal Reserve’s “dot plot,” publishing individual policymakers’ interest rate projections to enhance transparency around its monetary policy outlook. The move was intended to provide clearer signals to markets about the future path of rates amid economic uncertainty and shifting inflation expectations.

== Primary purpose ==
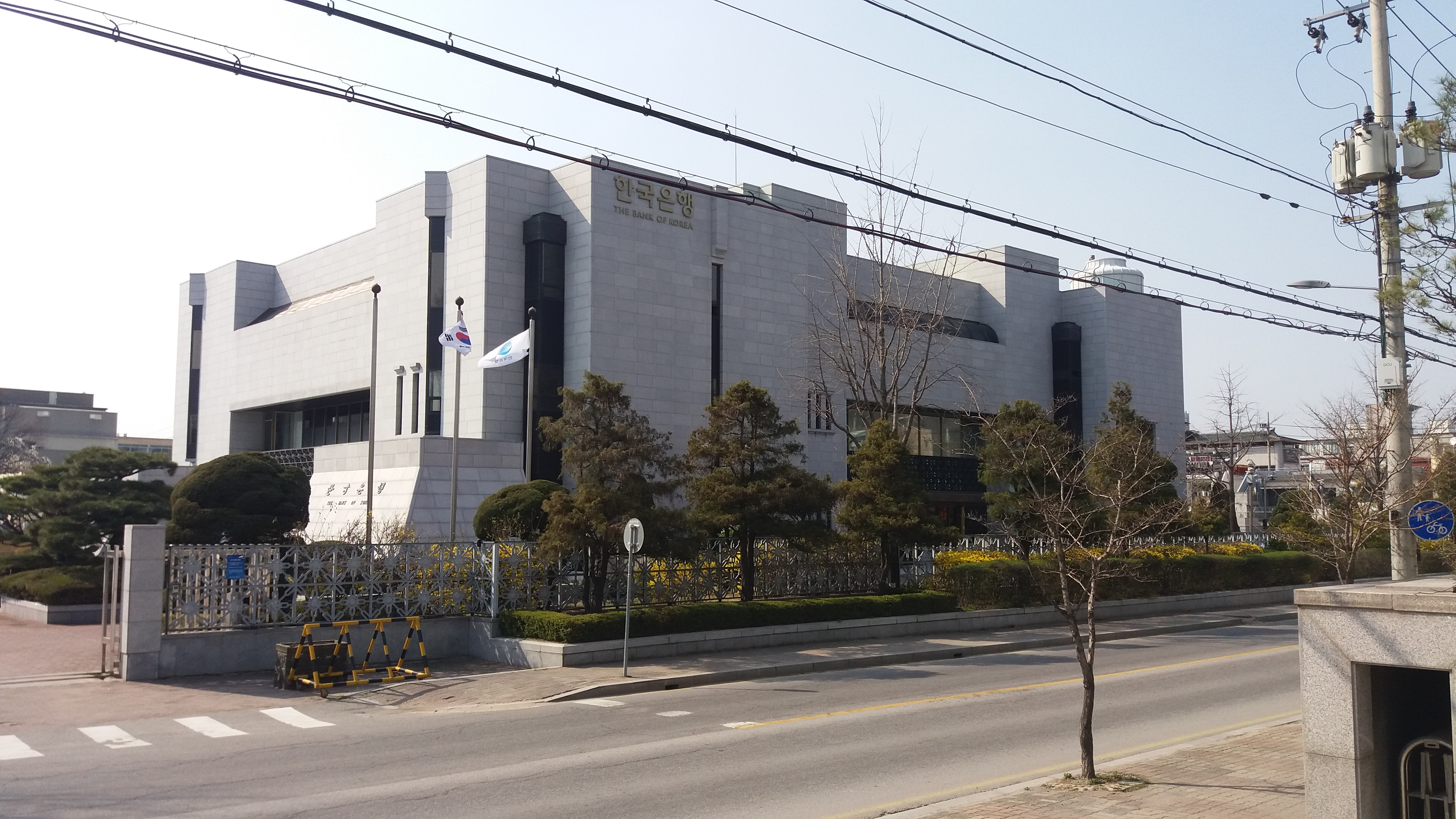
The Bank of Korea Chungbuk Branch

The primary purpose of the Bank is to pursue price stability.

Under the Bank of Korea Act (Article 1), the primary purpose of the Bank of Korea is pursuing price stability so as to contribute to the sound development of the national economy. The Bank of Korea implements this target through adjustments to its reference interest rate, the Base Rate.

The purchasing power of money depends on prices. When prices rise, the same amount of money buys less than before. Therefore, it is naturally the task of a central bank to safeguard the value of the money by keeping inflation low.

Prices are influenced by various factors such as corporate investment, household consumption and international prices of raw materials. Meanwhile, among the various policy instruments to bring about price stability, the monetary policy of a central bank, which adjusts the quantity of money in circulation, is the most effective.

For these reasons, the responsibility for price stability is given to central banks in most countries. The Bank sets and announces an inflation target for a certain period and strives to meet this target. The 2016–18 target is consumer price inflation of 2.0%.

== Organization ==
=== Monetary Policy Committee ===
At the apex of the Bank of Korea's organization is the Monetary Policy Committee (Geumnyung Tonghwa Wiwonhoe). The Committee's prime function is the formulation of monetary and credit policies. In addition, the Committee deliberates and resolves on major matters concerning the operations of the Bank of Korea.

The Monetary Policy Committee is composed of seven members representing various groups in the national economy:

1. the Governor, ex officio;
2. the Senior Deputy Governor, ex officio;
3. one member recommended by the Minister of Economy and Finance;
4. one member recommended by the Governor;
5. one member recommended by the Chairman of the Financial Services Commission;
6. one member recommended by the Chairman of the Korea Chamber of Commerce & Industry;
7. one member recommended by the Chairman of the Korea Federation of Banks.

The members are appointed by the President for four-year terms except the Senior Deputy Governor whose term is three years and are eligible for reappointment. All members serve on a full-time basis and no member may be discharged from office against his will. The Governor serves concurrently as the Chairman of the Committee.

=== Executive and auditor ===
The executive of the Bank of Korea consists of the governor, the senior deputy governor, and five or fewer deputy governors.

The governor, appointed by the president on the deliberation of the State Council, represents the bank. The term of office of the governor is four years and the governor may be reappointed once. The governor conducts policies formulated by the Monetary Policy Committee as the chief executive officer of the bank, keeps the committee informed about current matters requiring its attention and provides the bank with materials and advice necessary for the resolution of its policies. In addition, the Governor may attend and opine on matters related to money and credit at the State Council.

The senior deputy governor assists the governor and is appointed by the president upon the recommendation of the governor. The deputy governors are appointed by the governor and undertake their respective duties in the manner stipulated in the Articles of Incorporation of the Bank of Korea. The term of office of the senior deputy governor and each of the deputy governors is three years and they may be reappointed only once.

As for its executive body in detail, the bank has 15 departments in its head office in Seoul, and 16 branches in major cities. In addition, it has five overseas representative offices in major international financial centers, such as New York, Frankfurt, Tokyo, London, Beijing.

The auditor, appointed by the president on the recommendation of the minister of strategy and finance, inspects the operations of the Bank of Korea and reports the results to the Monetary Policy Committee. The auditor prepares and submits a comprehensive audit report to the government and Monetary Policy Committee each year. The term of the auditor is three years and may be reappointed once.

== Functions ==
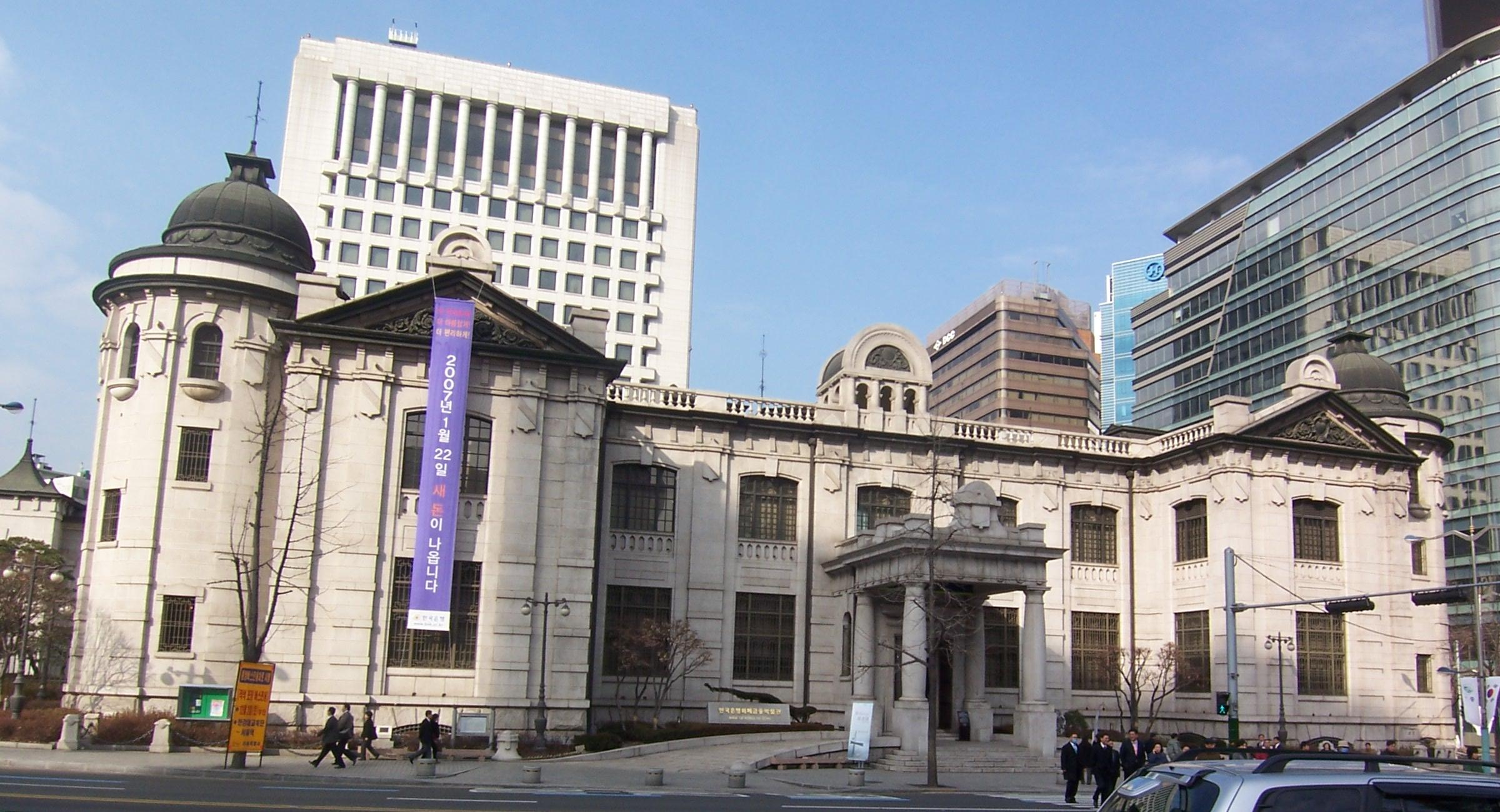
Bank of Korea

=== Issuing banknotes and coins ===
The Bank of Korea has the exclusive right to issue banknotes and coins in the Republic of Korea. Their dimensions, designs and denominations are determined by the Monetary Policy Committee with Government approval. The banknotes and coins thus issued have the status of legal tender within the country for all transactions, both public and private, without limitation.

Currently, there are four different denominations of banknotes in circulation: ₩1,000, ₩5,000, ₩10,000 and ₩50,000
and four denominations of coins: ₩10, ₩50, ₩100 and ₩500.

=== Conducting monetary and credit policy ===
The most important mission of the Bank of Korea is formulating and implementing monetary and credit policy. This is a process of controlling the supply or cost of money in order that the economy may grow in a sound manner on the basis of price stability. To this end, the Bank conducts monetary and credit policy with an emphasis on price stability while taking into consideration such matters as economic growth and financial market stability.

In order to achieve the ultimate goal of maintaining price stability, the Monetary Policy Committee of the Bank sets the Base Rate every month after overall consideration of price movements, economic activity and financial market conditions. Then the Bank steers the call rate to converge on the newly-set level of the Base Rate using its policy instruments. The change in the call rate affects market interest rates such as yields on CDs and Treasury bonds, and banks' deposit and loan interest rates. These changes in interest rates tend to influence consumption and investments and, as a result, inflation.

The Bank's monetary policy is conducted mainly through open market operations, apart from which the Bank uses lending and deposit facilities and reserve requirements policy.

=== Bankers' bank and government's bank ===
The Bank of Korea makes loans to and receives deposits from banks, thus serving as the banker to the banking sector.

The bank conducts credit operations with banks by rediscounting commercial bills or by extending loans against eligible collateral with maturities of up to one year.

As the lender of last resort, the Bank may extend exceptional loans to banking institutions in periods of serious emergency.

As the fiscal agent of the government of the Republic of Korea, the Bank of Korea carries out various kinds of businesses for the government in accordance with the Bank of Korea Act and other relevant laws.

=== Developing and managing payment systems ===
The Bank of Korea has onus for the operation and management of the nation's payment systems.

The bank provides settlement facilities to financial intermediaries by use of their current accounts with the Bank for final settlement purposes.

The bank operated a real-time gross settlement system for large-value interbank fund transfers, named BOK-Wire, since mid-December 1994. BOK-Wire was renamed BOK-Wire+ in April 2009, when a hybrid system was added to the system with such features as a continuous bilateral and multilateral offsetting mechanism.

=== Conducting supervisory functions for financial institutions ===
The Bank of Korea conducts supervisory functions for financial institutions as stipulated in the Bank of Korea Act and other related financial acts. The Bank may request information from banks and from non-bank financial institutions that enter into agreements to hold current account with it, when it deems necessary for the implementation of monetary policy.

The bank may request the Financial Supervisory Service (FSS) to examine financial institutions within a determined specific range. It may also require the FSS to have staff of the Bank participate on a joint basis in the examination of financial institutions.

=== Compilation of statistics and economic research ===
The bank compiles statistics which are essential to developing appropriate economic policies across all sectors including government. These include money and banking statistics, national income statistics, the producer price index, balance of payments statistics, flow of funds statistics, input-output tables, etc.

The bank carries out research on national and worldwide economic developments in order to formulate effective monetary policy and help advise the government on various economic policy options. It also publishes various periodicals, such as the annual report and the monthly and quarterly bulletins, to provide accurate and up-to-date information on the economy to the public.

=== Carrying out foreign exchange business and managing the official foreign reserves ===
The Bank of Korea does not have targets for the exchange rate and leaves it to be determined in the market. The Bank, however, does occasionally conduct smoothing operations in concert with the government in order to moderate disorderly movements prompted by herd behavior and the like.

To enhance the soundness of the foreign exchange sector, the Bank strives to maintain Korea's external debts at an appropriate level through monitoring inflows and outflows of foreign exchange and inspects and oversees the foreign exchange transactions of banks. The Bank also enters into currency swap agreements with other central banks to ensure ready access to foreign currencies when markets are disorderly.

The bank holds and manages the nation's foreign reserves at an appropriate level so that they serve as a safeguard in emergencies. The Bank invests the reserves mainly in safe and liquid foreign financial assets and strives to improve their profitability insofar as this does not detract from their safety.

=== Promoting cooperation with other central banks ===
The bank maintains close cooperation with other central banks and exchanges information and views with other policy-makers within multilateral organizations such as the BIS and IMF. The Bank also holds international seminars and workshops to share the nation's experience in having achieved remarkable economic development and overcoming financial crises. In recent years, The Bank has taken a leading role in establishing a global financial safety net as the central bank of the G-20 Summit chair nation.

== Governors of the Bank of Korea ==
Governor of the Bank of South Korea
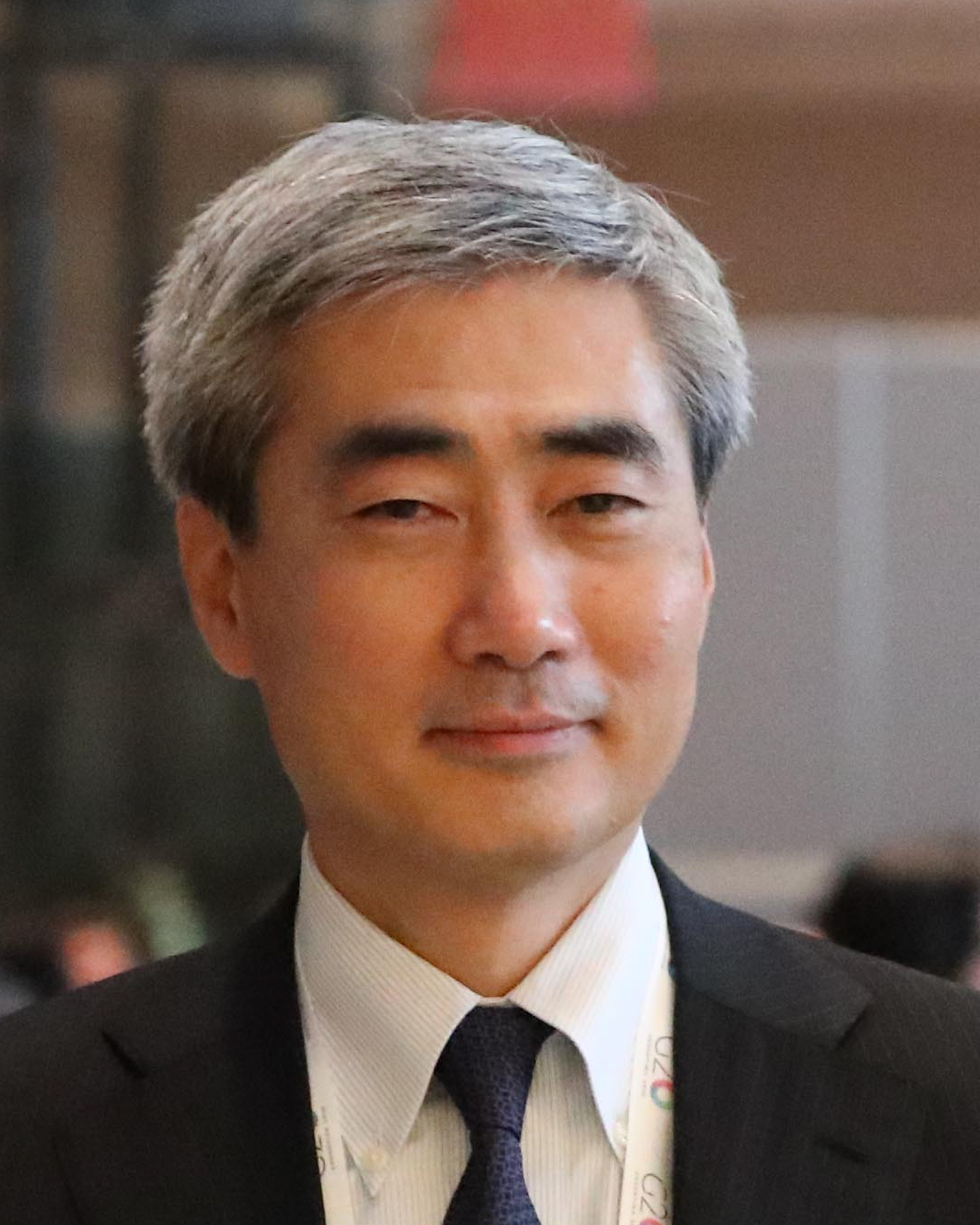
- Incumbent; Hyun Song Shin since 21 April 2026
- Style: His Excellency
- Appointer: The president

#	Governor	Start	End
1	Koo Yong-suh	5 June 1950	18 December 1951
2	Kim Yoo-taik	18 December 1951	12 December 1956
3	Kim Chin-hyung	12 December 1956	21 May 1960
4	Pai Eui-hwan	1 June 1960	8 September 1960
5	Chun Ye-yong	8 September 1960	30 May 1961
6	Yoo Chang-soon	30 May 1961	26 May 1962
7	Min Pyong-do	26 May 1962	3 June 1963
8	Rhi Jung-whan	3 June 1963	26 December 1963
9	Kim Se-ryeon	26 December 1963	25 December 1967
10	Suh Jin-soo	29 December 1967	2 May 1970
11	Seonghwan Kim	2 May 1970	1 May 1978
12	Shin Byong-hyun	2 May 1978	5 July 1980
13	Kim Joon-sung	5 July 1980	4 January 1982
14	Hah Yeung-ki	5 January 1982	31 October 1983
15	Choi Chang-nak	31 October 1983	7 January 1986
16	Park Sung-sang	13 January 1986	26 March 1988
17	Kim Kun	26 March 1988	25 March 1992
18	Cho Soon	26 March 1992	14 March 1993
19	Kim Myung-ho	15 March 1993	23 August 1995
20	Lee Kyung-shik	24 August 1995	5 March 1998
21	Chon Chol-hwan	6 March 1998	31 March 2002
22	Park Seung	1 April 2002	31 March 2006
23	Lee Seong-tae	1 April 2006	31 March 2010
24	Kim Choong-soo	1 April 2010	31 March 2014
25–26	Lee Ju-yeol	1 April 2014	31 March 2022
27	Rhee Chang-yong	21 April 2022	20 April 2026
28	Hyun Song Shin	21 April 2026	Incumbent

== See also ==
- List of central banks
- List of banks in South Korea
- Economy of South Korea
- South Korean won
- Korean won
- Bank of Korea Museum
- Korea Financial Investment Association
- Payment system
- Real-time gross settlement
