= Korea Minting and Security Printing Corporation =

South Korean minting company

Korea Minting, Security Printing and ID Card Operating Corporation
- Company type: State-owned
- Industry: Mint and Printing
- Founded: 1 October 1951; 74 years ago
- Headquarters: Gajeong-dong, Yuseong-gu, Daejeon, South Korea
- Key people: Sung Chang Hoon, President
- Products: Banknote; Coin; Passports; Cashier's cheques Postage stamps Vouchers and gift certificates
- Number of employees: 1,562
- Parent: Ministry of Economy and Finance
- Website: english.komsco.com

- Korea Minting and Security Printing Corporation
- Hangul: 한국조폐공사
- Hanja: 韓國造幣公社
- RR: Hanguk jopye gongsa
- MR: Han'guk chop'ye kongsa

The Korea Minting, Security Printing and ID Card Operating Corporation (KOMSCO; Korean: 한국조폐공사) is a state-owned corporation which is responsible to print and mint the banknotes and coins and other government documents. Its headquarters are located in Daejeon, South Korea.

The Korea Minting and Security Printing Corporation (KOMSCO) is responsible for the production and distribution of various security products in South Korea. Among its primary outputs are banknotes, checks, stamps, securities, bonds, and gift certificates. KOMSCO supplies these items to several key institutions and entities within the country, including the Bank of Korea, the Ministry of Economy and Finance, the Korea Federation of Banks, and the Korea Post. Additionally, it serves major distribution conglomerates such as Shinsegae, NongHyup, KEB Hana Bank, Dong-A Pharmaceutical, Homeplus, and GS latex , ensuring a wide-reaching impact on the nation's financial and security printing industry.

The Korea Minting and Security Printing Corporation (KOMSCO) also plays a significant role in the production and supply of coins and specialized security products. This includes the manufacturing of circulation coins, commemorative coins, medals, various precious metal products, and decorations. These items are supplied to several important institutions such as the Bank of Korea, the Ministry of the Interior and Safety, major corporations, and leading universities.

Medals and decorations are produced at the Currency Headquarters located in Gyeongsan. KOMSCO manufactures and supplies the government with twelve types of decorations, including the prestigious Order of the Mugunghwa. In the field of medals, KOMSCO has produced a variety of commemorative medals for the government, including Olympic medals, as well as promotional medals, art medals, long service medals, and replicas of cultural heritage items.

== Products ==
The main job of KOMSCO is printing and minting the South Korean currency. Currently the 1000, 5000, 10,000, 50,000 KRW banknotes and the 1, 5, 10, 50, 100, 500 KRW coins are minted and printed by the currency plant of KOMSCO. Also, they produce all South Korean cheques, stamps, and passports. KOMSCO currently produces four bullion coin series; Komsco Tiger series, Chiwoo Cheonwang, Zi:Sin, and the K Series.
