= Sohamhung station =

Railway station in North Korea

West Hamhŭng 서함흥

Korean name
- Hangul: 서함흥역
- Hanja: 西咸興驛
- Revised Romanization: Seohamheung-yeok
- McCune–Reischauer: Sŏhamhŭng-yŏk

General information
- Location: Sŏngch'ŏngang-guyŏk, Hamhŭng-si, South Hamgyŏng; North Korea
- Coordinates: 39.903997°N 127.536675°E
- Owner: Korean State Railway
- Platforms: 2
- Tracks: 4

History
- Opened: 25 August 1923
- Original company: Sinhŭng Railway

Services
Preceding station	Korean State Railway	Following station
Hamhŭng Terminus	Sŏho Line	Sap'o towards Sŏho
Location

Sŏhamhŭng station (West Hamhŭng station) is a railway station in Sŏngch'ŏngang-guyŏk, Hamhŭng city, South Hamgyŏng province, North Korea, on the Sŏho Line of the Korean State Railway. Locomotive and rolling stock maintenance facilities for the narrow gauge equipment used on the line are located here.

== History ==
The station was opened on 25 August 1923 by the Sinhŭng Railway, becoming the northern terminus of the Namhŭng Line between Sŏho station and here when the first section of that line, West Hamhŭng–Ch'ŏngiri, was opened on 11 May 1934. The Sinhŭng Railway was bought and absorbed by the Chosen Railway on 22 April 1938. Although originally the Hamhŭng–Hamnam Sinhŭng Hamnam Line ran through West Hamhŭng station, since the regauging of that line the new standard-gauge line bypasses this station.
