= Chongdo Line =

Railway line in North Korea

Chŏngdo Line

Overview
- Native name: 정도선 (鼎島線)
- Status: Operational
- Owner: Chosen Railway (1937–1944); Chosen Government Railway (1944–1945); Korean State Railway (since 1945)
- Locale: Haeju-si, South Hwanghae
- Termini: Wangsin; Chŏngdo
- Stations: 2

Service
- Type: Heavy rail, Regional rail, Freight rail

History
- Opened: 10 May 1937

Technical
- Line length: 0.7 km (0.43 mi)
- Number of tracks: Single track
- Track gauge: 1,435 mm (4 ft 8 1/2 in) standard gauge
- Electrification: 3000 V DC Catenary

- Chongdo Line
- Hangul: 정도선
- Hanja: 鼎島線
- RR: Jeongdoseon
- MR: Chŏngdosŏn

The Chŏngdo Line is an electrified standard-gauge secondary line of the Korean State Railway in South Hwanghae Province, North Korea, running from Wangsin station on the Ongjin Line to Chŏngdo station.

== History ==
Established in 1923 through the merger of six smaller railways, by the mid 1930s the Chosen Railway (Chōtetsu) had become the largest privately owned railway in colonial Korea, and had built an extensive network of 762 mm (30.0 in) narrow gauge rail lines in the Hwanghae region. By the end of 1935, this Hwanghae Line network ran Sariwŏn—Samgang—Sugyo, Samgang—East Haeju—Haeju Port, and Haeju—East Haeju—Tosŏng.

On 10 May 1937, Chōtetsu opened a short (0.7 km (0.43 mi)) line from Tongp'o, located on the Haeju—Ch'wiya section (extended to Ongjin on 19 May) of the Hwanghae Line network, to Chŏngdo to serve the Haeju Port. After Chōtetsu sold the Hwanghae Line network to the Chosen Government Railway (Sentetsu) on 1 April 1944, Sentetsu split the network into several different lines; the Haeju—Ongjin section became the Ongjin Line, and the Tongp'o—Chŏngdo section became the Chŏngdo Line; this line was eventually extended to the port facilities at T'ŏlsŏm.

After the end of the Pacific War and the subsequent partition of Korea, the Chŏngdo Line was located within the territory of the DPRK. After the conversion of the Sariwŏn—Haeju Hwanghae Ch'ŏngnyŏn Line to standard gauge in 1958, the Chŏngdo Line was likewise regauged. Electrification of the Chŏngdo Line was completed in April 1982.

== Route ==
A yellow background in the "Distance" box indicates that section of the line is not electrified.

Distance (km)		Station Name		Former Name		
Total	S2S	Transcribed	Chosŏn'gŭl (Hanja)	Transcribed	Chosŏn'gŭl (Hanja)	Connections
0.0	0.0	Wangsin	왕신 (王神)	Tongp'o	동포 (東浦)	Ongjin Line
0.7	0.7	Chŏngdo	정도 (鼎島)			
		Haejuhang (Haeju Port)	애주항 (海州港)			Closed
		T'ŏlsŏmhang (T'ŏlsŏm Port)	털섬항 (-)			
