= Pujonhoban station =

Railway station in North Korea

Pujŏnhoban 부전호반

Korean name
- Hangul: 부전호반역
- Hanja: 赴戦湖畔驛
- Revised Romanization: Bujeonhoban-yeok
- McCune–Reischauer: Pujŏnhoban-yŏk

General information
- Location: Pujŏn'gowŏn, Hobal-lodongjagu, Pujŏn County; South Hamgyŏng; North Korea
- Coordinates: 40.5477°N 127.5696°E
- Owner: Korean State Railway
- Platforms: 1
- Tracks: 2

History
- Opened: 10 September 1932
- Original company: Sinhŭng Railway

Services
Preceding station	Korean State Railway	Following station
Terminus	Sinhŭng Line (762 mm)	Toan towards Sinhŭng
Location

Pujŏnhoban station is a railway station in Pujŏn'gowŏn, Hobal-lodongjagu, Pujŏn County, South Hamgyŏng province, North Korea. It is the terminus of the (narrow gauge) Sinhŭng Line of the Korean State Railway.

== History ==
The station was opened on 10 September 1932 by the Sinhŭng Railway as part of the 31.6 km (19.6 mi) second section of its Songhŭng Line between Hamnam Songhŭng and here. The Sinhŭng Railway was bought and absorbed by the Chosen Railway on 22 April 1938.
