= Sinhung station =

Railway station in North Korea

Sinhŭng 신흥

Korean name
- Hangul: 신흥역
- Hanja: 新興驛
- Revised Romanization: Sinheung-yeok
- McCune–Reischauer: Sinhŭng-yŏk

General information
- Location: Sinhŭng-ŭp, Sinhŭng-gun, South Hamgyŏng; North Korea
- Coordinates: 40.2001°N 127.5491°E
- Owner: Korean State Railway
- Platforms: 1 (1435 mm); 1 (762 mm)
- Tracks: 3 (1435 mm), 3 (762 mm), 6 (transloading yard)

History
- Opened: 1 October 1926
- Former names: Hamnam Sinhŭng
- Original company: Sinhŭng Railway

Services
Preceding station	Korean State Railway	Following station
Terminus	Sinhŭng Line (1435 mm)	Ch'ŏnbulsan towards Hamhŭng
Tonghŭng towards Pujŏnhoban	Sinhŭng Line (762 mm)	Terminus
Location

Sinhŭng station is a railway station in Sinhŭng-ŭp, Sinhŭng county, South Hamgyŏng province, North Korea on the Sinhŭng Line of the Korean State Railway. It is the changing point between the standard and narrow gauge sections of the line. There are facilities for servicing the locomotives and rolling stock of the narrow gauge line here, and there is a short (narrow gauge) branch to P'ungdŏk, an industrial halt in Sinhŭng-rodongjagu.

== History ==
The station, originally called Hamnam Sinhŭng station, was opened on 1 October 1926 by the Sinhŭng Railway as part of the 15.1 km (9.4 mi) third section of its Hamnam Line between P'ungsang and here. The Sinhŭng Railway was bought and absorbed by the Chosen Railway on 22 April 1938. It received its current name after the establishment of the DPRK.
