= Soho station =

Railway station in Hungnam, North Korea

Sŏho 서호

Korean name
- Hangul: 서호역
- Hanja: 西湖驛
- Revised Romanization: Seoho-yeok
- McCune–Reischauer: Sŏho-yŏk

General information
- Location: Sŏho 2-dong, Hŭngnam-guyŏk, Hamhŭng-si, South Hamgyŏng; North Korea
- Coordinates: 39.8277°N 127.6501°E
- Owner: Korean State Railway
- Platforms: 2
- Tracks: 4

History
- Opened: 1 December 1922
- Former names: Sŏhojin
- Original company: Chosen Government Railway

Services
Preceding station	Korean State Railway	Following station
Hŭngnam towards P'yŏngyang	P'yŏngra Line	Majŏn towards Rajin
Hadŏk towards Hamhŭng	Sŏho Line	Terminus
Location

Sŏho station is a railway station in Sŏho 2-dong, Hŭngnam-guyŏk, Hamhŭng city, South Hamgyŏng province, North Korea on the P'yŏngra Line of the Korean State Railway; it is also one of the southern termini of the (narrow gauge) Sŏho Line.

== History ==
Originally called Sŏhojin station, the station was opened on 1 December 1922 by the Chosen Government Railway as part of the 18.0 km (11.2 mi) Hamhŭng–Sŏhojin section of the Hamgyŏng Line. The station became the southern terminus of the narrow gauge Namhŭng Line (nowadays the Sõho Line) of the Sinhŭng Railway on 15 December 1936; the Sinhŭng Railway was bought and absorbed by the Chosen Railway on 22 April 1938. Sŏho station received its current name after the establishment of the DPRK.
