= Paechon Line =

Railway line in North Korea

Paech'ŏn Line

Overview
- Other name: Tohae Line
- Native name: 배천선(白川線)
- Status: Operational
- Owner: Chosen Railway (1931–1944); Chosen Government Railway (1944–1945); Korean National Railroad (1945–1950); Korean State Railway (since 1953)
- Locale: South Hwanghae
- Termini: Changbang; Ŭnbit
- Stations: 11

Service
- Type: Heavy rail, Passenger/Freight; Regional rail

History
- Opened: Stages between 1931-1971

Technical
- Line length: 64.4 km (40.0 mi)
- Number of tracks: Single track
- Track gauge: 1,435 mm (4 ft 8 1/2 in) standard gauge
- Old gauge: 762 mm (2 ft 6 in)
- Electrification: 3000 V DC Overhead line (Changbang - Ch'ŏngdan)
Route map
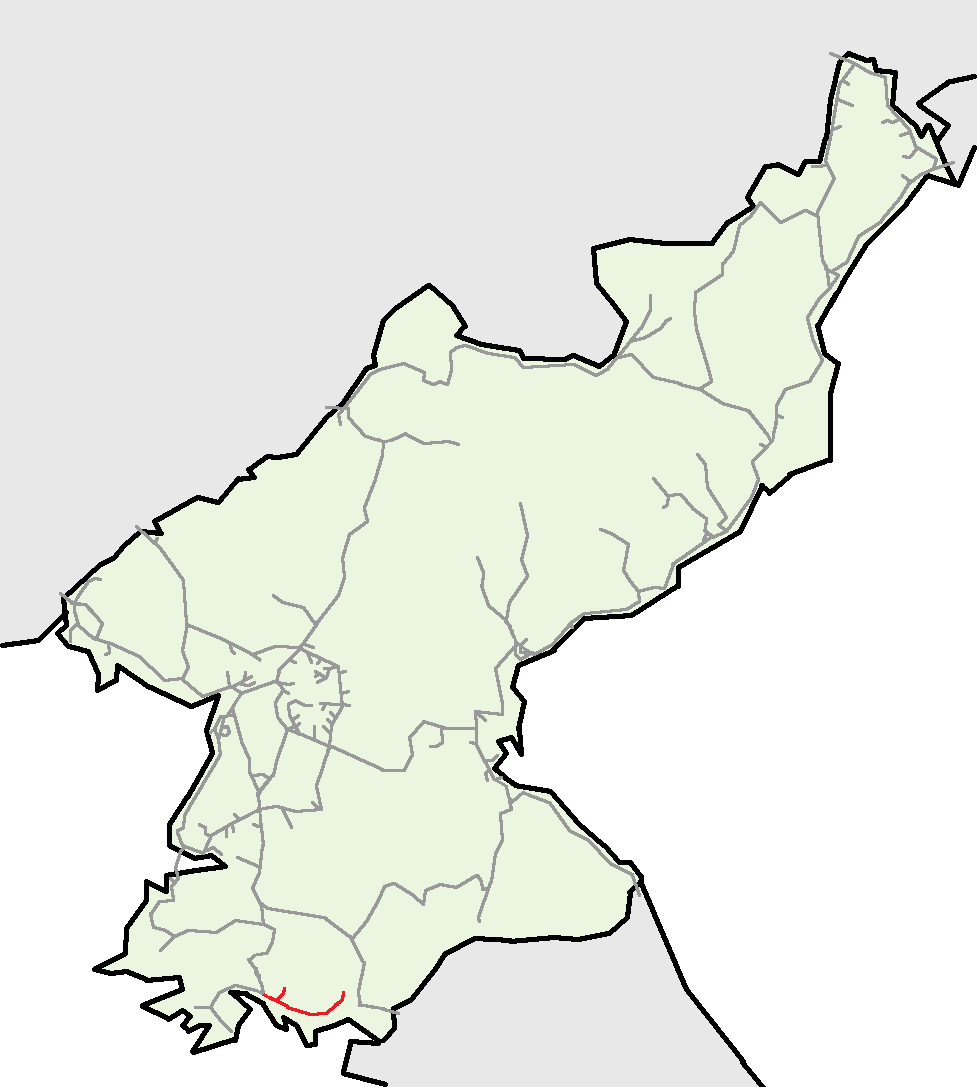

- Paechon Line
- Hangul: 배천선
- Hanja: 白川線
- RR: Baecheonseon
- MR: Paech'ŏnsŏn

The Paech'ŏn Line is a partially electrified standard-gauge secondary railway line of the Korean State Railway in South Hwanghae Province, North Korea, running from Changbang on the Hwanghae Ch'ŏngnyŏn Line to Ŭnbit.

== History ==
By the end of 1930, the Chosen Railway (abbreviated Chōtetsu), the largest privately owned railway in colonial Korea, had extended its Hwanghae Line network to run from Sariwŏn to Sugyo in the west and to Haeju in the south, completing the latter line in December of that year. Chōtetsu then began building eastwards from Haeju to create a southern connection to the Kyŏngŭi Line, the state-owned Chosen Government Railway's (abbreviated Sentetsu) mainline from Kyŏngsŏng to Sinŭiju and Andong, Manchuria, opening the first section of a new 762 mm (30.0 in) narrow-gauge line, from East Haeju to Yŏn'an, on 21 December 1931. The second section was opened on 1 September 1932, running from Yŏn'an across the Ryesong River to connect to the Kyŏngŭi Line at Tosŏng (later renamed Kaep'ung). A 2.3 km (1.4 mi) extension west from East Haeju to Haeju was opened on 1 July 1933.

Chōtetsu sold the Hwanghae Line network to Sentetsu on 1 April 1944, which absorbed the split the network into separate lines, with the Haeju—Tosŏng line becoming known as the Tohae Line.

Following the end of the Pacific War and the subsequent partition of Korea, most of the Tohae Line was located in the US zone of occupation that later became South Korea, with the line being divided along the 38th Parallel between Changbang and Kalsan, and the Korean National Railroad operated passenger trains on the line between Tosŏng and Ch'ŏngdan until 1950. The line was heavily damaged during the Korean War, and the destruction of the Ryesong River bridge left the line truncated at Paech'ŏn. The truncated line ended up in North Korea after the Korean Armistice, becoming part of the Korean State Railway which gave the line its current name of Paech'ŏn Line. The Korean State Railway completed the conversion of the Haeju—Paech'ŏn line to standard gauge in 1971, at the same time adding an extension from Paech'ŏn to the current terminus, Ŭnbit.

Electrification of the section from Changbang to Ch'ŏngdan was completed by April 1982.

Date	Section	Length	Original Builder
21 December 1931	East Haeju–Yŏn'an	45.1 km (28.0 mi)	Chosen Railway
1 September 1932	Yŏn'an–Tosŏng (Kaep'ung)	34.1 km (21.2 mi)	Chosen Railway
1 July 1933	Haeju–East Haeju	2.3 km (1.4 mi)	Chosen Railway
1971	Haeju–Paech'ŏn (converted to standard gauge)	62.5 km (38.8 mi)	Korean State Railway
1971	Paech'ŏn–Ŭnbit (standard gauge)	1.9 km (1.2 mi)	Korean State Railway

== Route ==
A yellow background in the "Distance" box indicates that section of the line is not electrified.

Distance (km)		Station Name		Former Name		
Total	S2S	Transcribed	Chosŏn'gŭl (Hanja)	Transcribed	Chosŏn'gŭl (Hanja)	Connections
-1.1	0.0	Haeju Ch'ŏngnyŏn	해주청년 (海州靑年)			Hwanghae Ch'ŏngnyŏn Line; Ongjin Line
Although part of the Hwanghae Ch'ŏngnyŏn Line and not the Paech'ŏn Line, all Paech'ŏn Line trains travel to/from Haeju Ch'ŏngnyŏn.
0.0	0.0	East Haeju (Tonghaeju)	동해주 (東海州)			Hwanghae Ch'ŏngnyŏn Line
7.8	7.8	Changbang	장방 (長芳)			Hwanghae Ch'ŏngnyŏn Line
11.5	3.7	Kalsan	갈산 (葛山)	Ch'ŏngyŏl	천결 (泉決)	
~~16.4~~	~~4.9~~	Naesŏng	내성 (来城)		Closed	
20.5	4.1	Ch'ŏngdan	청단 (靑丹)			Tŏktal Line
~~24.1~~	~~3.6~~	Simgye	심계 (深桂)			Closed
28.7	4.6	Ch'ŏnt'ae	천태 (天台)			
33.7	5.0	P'ungch'ŏn	풍천 (豊川)	P'ungch'ŏn	풍천 (楓川)	
39.4	5.7	Ohyŏn	오현 (悟峴)	Pongsŏ	봉서 (鳳西)	
45.1	5.7	Yŏn'an	연안 (延安)			
50.6	5.5	Onjŏng	온정 (溫井)	Yŏn'an Onch'ŏn	연안온천 (延安溫泉)	
~~54.8~~	~~4.2~~	Mugu	무구 (無仇)			Closed
58.2	3.4	Honghyŏn	홍현 (紅峴)			
62.5	4.3	Paech'ŏn	배천 (白川)	Paech'ŏn Onch'ŏn	배천온천 (白川溫泉)	
64.4	1.9	Ŭnbit	은빛 (銀빛)			
67.7	3.3	Ŭnbit freight yard	은빛 (銀빛)			
↓↓ Former line destroyed in Korean War ↓↓
~~67.5~~	~~5.0~~	Sŏngho	은빛 (銀빛)			Closed
~~72.8~~	~~5.3~~	Ryesŏnggang	례성강 (禮成江)	Yesŏnggang	예성강 (禮成江)	Closed
~~79.7~~	~~6.9~~	Kaep'ung	개풍 (開豊)	T'osŏng	토성 (土城)	P'yŏngbu Line

== Tŏktal Line ==
Opened in 1931 by Chōtetsu. Not electrified; closed.

Distance (km)		Station Name		Former Name		
Total	S2S	Transcribed	Chosŏn'gŭl (Hanja)	Transcribed	Chosŏn'gŭl (Hanja)	Connections
0.0	0.0	Ch'ŏngdan	청단 (靑丹)			Paech'ŏn Line
~~4.3~~	~~4.3~~	Hwayang	화양 (花陽)			Closed
~~12.7~~	~~8.4~~	Tŏktal	덕달 (德達)			Closed
