= 900 class =

900 class or Class 900 may refer to:

- Chōsen Railway Class 900, 2-8-2 steam locomotives
- GS&WR Class 900, 4-8-0T steam locomotives
- New South Wales 900/800 class railcar
- PNR 900 class, Philippine National Railways diesel locomotives
- South Australian Railways 900 class, diesel locomotives
