= Jeonnam Line =

Railway line in colonial Korea

Overview
- Native name: 전남선 (全南線)
- Status: Merged (see text)
- Owner: Chōsen Southern Railway (1922–1923); Chōsen Railway (1923–1945)
- Locale: South Jeolla
- Termini: Jeonnam Gwangju; Damyang
- Stations: 14

Service
- Type: Heavy rail, Regional rail Passenger/Freight
- Operator(s): Chōsen Southern Railway; Chōsen Railway

History
- Opened: 1 July 1922

Technical
- Line length: 35.5 km (22.1 mi)
- Number of tracks: Single track
- Track gauge: 1,435 mm (4 ft 8 1/2 in) standard gauge

The Jeonnam Line (全南線, Zen'nan-sen) was a railway line of the Chōsen Railway (Chōtetsu) of colonial-era Korea, located in South Jeolla Province.

== History ==
On 13 July 1918, the privately owned Chōsen Southern Railway was granted a concession to build a railway line from Songjeongni (now Gwangju Songjeong) to Masan via Damyang and Jinju. Work on the Songjeongni–Damyang section began in April 1921, and was opened to traffic on 1 July 1922 as the Jeonnam Line; the month prior, work had begun on the Masan–Jinju section, which was later opened as the Gyeongnam Line. On 1 September 1923, the Chōsen Southern Railway merged with five other privately owned railways to create the Chōsen Railway. Work to build the Damyang–Jinju section was never completed, and on 31 October 1944, the Gwangju–Damyang section was dismantled. After the end of the Pacific War and the nationalisation of Korea's railways, the Korean National Railroad divided the Jeonnam Line, making the Gwangju–Seongjeongni section part of the Gwangju Line, and after completing the Songjeong–Jinju section, merging that into the Gyeongjeon Line.

== Route ==
全南線 - 전남선 - Zen'nan Line - Jeonnam Line
Distance		Station name				
Total; km	S2S; km	Transcribed, Korean	Transcribed, Japanese	Hunminjeongeum	Hanja/Kanji	Connections
0.0	0.0	Jeonnam Gwangju	Zen'nan Kōshū	전남광주	全南光州	
7.4	7.4	Geungnakgang	Gokurakkō	극락강	極楽江	
14.0	14.0	Songjeongni	Shōchōri	송정리	松汀里	Sentetsu Honam Line
23.1	9.1	Mangwol	Bōgetsu	망월	望月	
26.9	3.8	Jangsan	Chōzan	장산	長山	
31.0	4.1	Mahang	Bakō	마항	馬項	
35.5	4.5	Damyang	Tan'yō	담양	潭陽	
