= Changbang station =

Railway station in North Korea

Changbang 장방

Korean name
- Hangul: 장방역
- Hanja: 長芳驛
- Revised Romanization: Jangbang-yeok
- McCune–Reischauer: Changbang-yŏk

General information
- Location: Changbang-ri, Haeju-si, South Hwanghae; North Korea
- Coordinates: 38.0069°N 125.8204°E
- Owner: Korean State Railway
- Platforms: 2 (1 island)
- Tracks: 5

History
- Opened: 11 December 1930
- Original company: Chosen Railway

Services
Preceding station	Korean State Railway	Following station
Hakhyŏn towards Sariwŏn Ch'ŏngnyŏn	Hwanghae Ch'ŏngnyŏn Line	East Haeju towards Haeju Ch'ŏngnyŏn
East Haeju Terminus	Paech'ŏn Line	Kalsan towards Ŭnbit
Location

Changbang station is a railway station in Changbang-ri, Haeju City, South Hwanghae Province, North Korea, on the Hwanghae Ch'ŏngnyŏn Line of the Korean State Railway. It is also the western terminus of the Paech'ŏn Line.

== History ==
Changbang station was opened by the Chosen Railway on 11 December 1930, along with the rest of the Hakhyŏn–East Haeju section of the former Sahae Line.
