= Suin Line (1937–1995) =

Railway line in colonial Korea

Overview
- Native name: 수인선(水仁線)
- Status: Closed
- Owner: Chōsen Gyeongdong Railway (1937–1942); Chōsen Railway (1942–1945)
- Locale: Gyeonggi
- Termini: Suwon; Incheon Port
- Stations: 17

Service
- Type: Heavy rail, Regional rail Passenger/Freight
- Operator(s): Chōsen Gyeongdong Railway; Chōsen Railway

History
- Opened: 1937

Technical
- Line length: 52.0 km (32.3 mi)
- Number of tracks: Single track
- Track gauge: 762 mm (2 ft 6 in)

The Suin Line (水仁線, Suijin-sen) was a 762 mm (2 ft 6 in) narrow gauge railway line built by the Chōsen Railway (Chōtetsu) during colonial-era Korea, located in Gyeonggi Province.

== History ==
The privately owned Chōsen Gyeongdong Railway was granted a licence to build a second railway line to haul salt from Sorae. Starting at Suwon, terminus of the railway's Suryeo Line, a 52.0 km (32.3 mi) line was built to Incheon Port via Sorae, and was opened for operation on 5 August 1937. On 26 October 1942, the Chōsen Gyeongdong Railway was acquired by the Chōsen Railway, which continued operating the line until the end of the Pacific War.

Following the partition of Korea and the establishment of the Republic of Korea, on 17 May 1946 Chōtetsu, along with all other railways in the country, was nationalised, and the new Korean National Railroad took over operation of the Suin Line. Over the following years, the KNR continued to operate the line, keeping the Suin Line name but making numerous changes; recently, the line has been undergoing conversion to 1,435 mm (4 ft 8 1/2 in) standard gauge.

== Services ==
In the November 1942 timetable, the last issued prior to the start of the Pacific War, Chōtetsu operated four daily, third-class-only local passenger trains:

Distance (read down)	-	-	-	-	Station name	Distance (read up)	-	-	-	-
0.0	05:00	08:52	13:00	17:00	Suwon	52.0	08:19	12:00	16:41	19:05
52.0	07:14	12:38	15:11	19:10	Incheon Port	0.0	05:00	09:44	12:46	16:44

== Route ==
水仁線 - 수인선 - Suijin Line - Suin Line
Distance		Station name				
Total; km	S2S; km	Transcribed, Korean	Transcribed, Japanese	Hunminjeongeum	Hanja/Kanji	Connections
0.0	0.0	Suwon	Suigen	수원	水原	Suryeo Line, Sentetsu Gyeongbu Line
3.9	3.9	Gosaek	Kosaku	고색	古索	
5.8	1.9	Omok	Gomoku	오목	梧木	
10.7	4.9	Eocheon	Gyosen	어천	漁川	
13.7	3.0	Yamok	Yaboku	야목	野牧	
15.1	1.4	Binjeong	Hinchō	빈정	濱汀	
20.0	4.9	Illi	Itsuri	일리	一里	
21.6	1.6	Seongdo	Jōtō	성두	城頭	
27.9	6.3	Wongok	Genkoku	원곡	元谷	
29.2	1.3	Singil	Shinkitsu	신길	新吉	
32.4	3.2	Gunja	Kunshi	군자	君子	
38.6	6.2	Sorae	Sorai	소래	蘇萊	
41.4	2.9	Nonhyeon	Ronken	논현	論峴	
42.4	0.9	Namdong	Nantō	남동	南洞	
45.8	3.4	Munhak	Bunkaku	문학	文鶴	
47.0	1.5	Songdo	Matsushima	송도	松島	
52.0	5.0	Incheonhang; Incheon Port	Jinsenkō	인천항	仁川港	
