= Soho Line =

Railway line in North Korea

Sŏho Line
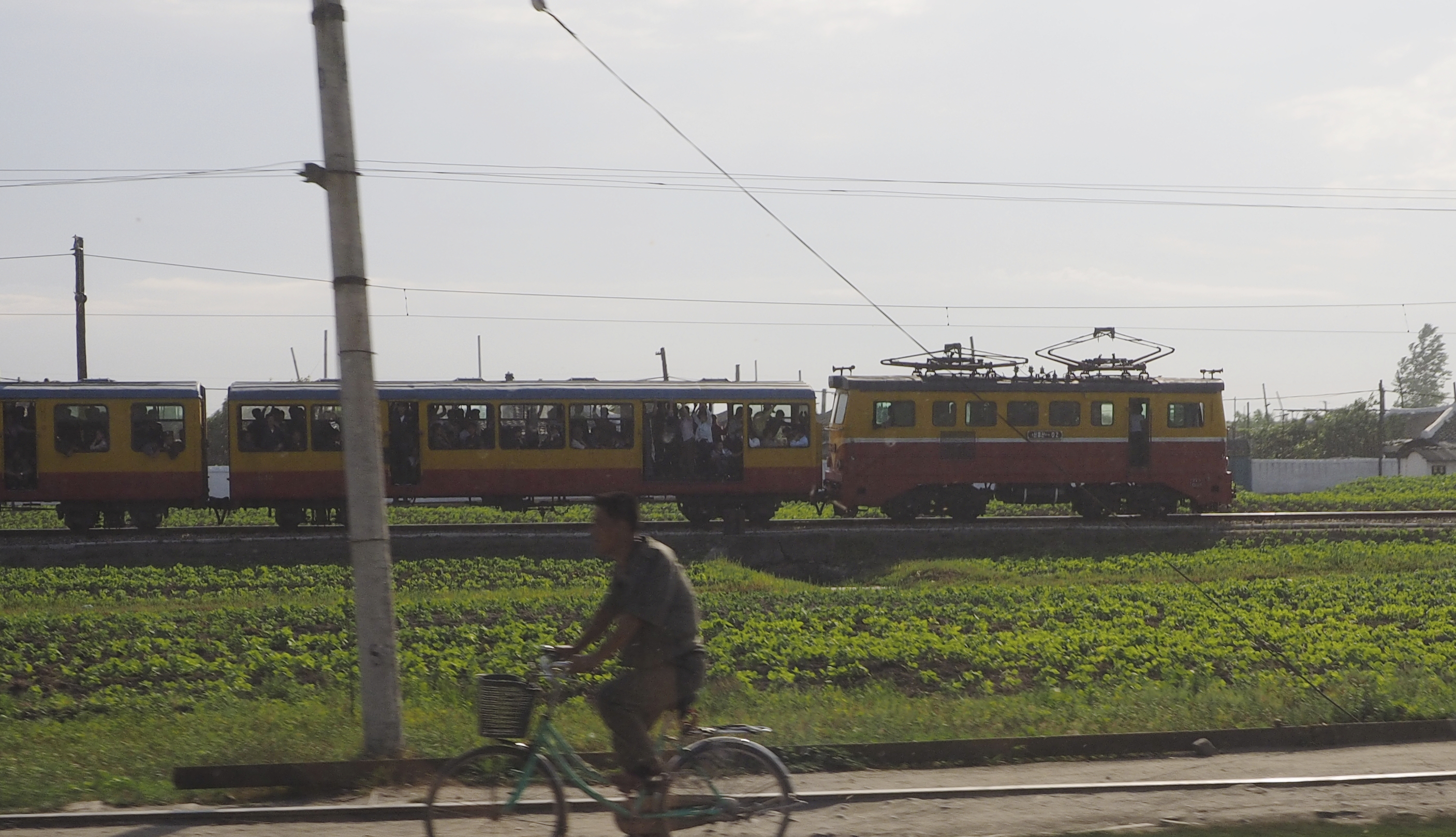
- A narrow-gauge passenger train on the Sŏho Line.

Overview
- Native name: 서호선 (西湖線)
- Status: Operational
- Owner: Sinhŭng Railway (1934–1938); Chosen Railway (1938–1945); Korean State Railway (since 1945)
- Termini: Hamhŭng; Sŏho, Hŭngnam
- Stations: 11

Service
- Type: Light rail, Passenger rail Regional rail
- Depot(s): West Hamhŭng

History
- Opened: 11 May 1934 (Hamhŭng—Ch'ŏngiri (Hadŏk)); 5 March 1936 (Ch'ŏngiri—Naeho); 15 December 1936 (Naeho—Sŏhojin)

Technical
- Line length: 17.6 km (10.9 mi)
- Number of tracks: Single track
- Track gauge: 762 mm (2 ft 6 in)
- Electrification: 1500 V DC Overhead line

- Soho Line
- Hangul: 서호선
- Hanja: 西湖線
- RR: Seohoseon
- MR: Sŏhosŏn

The Sŏho Line is an electrified 762 mm (2 ft 6 in) narrow gauge railway line of the Korean State Railway in Hamhŭng-si, North Korea, running from Hamhŭng to Hŭngnam and Sŏho.

== History ==
During the Japanese colonial era, the privately owned Sinhŭng Railway built a network of 762 mm (2 ft 6.0 in) narrow-gauge railways around Hamhŭng. These were the Hamnam Line, the Jangjin Line, and the Songheung Line opened between 1923 and 1933, and the Namhŭng Line, which was opened in three sections between 1934 and 1936.

Section	Opening date	Length
West Hamhŭng - Ch'ŏngiri (Hadŏk)	11 May 1934	14.9 km (9.3 mi)
Ch'ŏngiri - Naeho (closed)	5 March 1936	1.7 km (1.1 mi)
Naeho - Sŏhojin	15 December 1936	1.7 km (1.1 mi)

The Sinhŭng Railway was bought by the Chosen Railway on 22 April 1938.

After the defeat of Japan in the Pacific War and the subsequent partition of Korea, the entirety of the line, being north of the 38th parallel, was located in the Soviet zone of occupation; on 10 August 1946, the Provisional People's Committee for North Korea nationalised all railways within its jurisdiction, including the Namhŭng Line, and it has since been operated by the Korean State Railway.

Originally built entirely as a narrow gauge line, frequent accidents on the line led the Korean State Railway to convert the Hamhŭng—Sinhŭng section of the Sinhŭng Line to standard gauge for greater safety and increased transportation capacity; after the regauging of this section was completed, West Hamhŭng station was disconnected from the Sinhŭng line. When Naeho Station was closed, the line between Hadŏk and Sŏho was realigned to the current, shorter alignment.

In 2017, the line was reconstructed with the participation of the Hamhung Narrow Gauge Railroad office, Yonggwang Yonju plant and organised by the South Hamgyong provincial party office. Stations, sleepers and concrete poles were all replaced. Hungdok station was rebuilt as a model station.

== Services ==
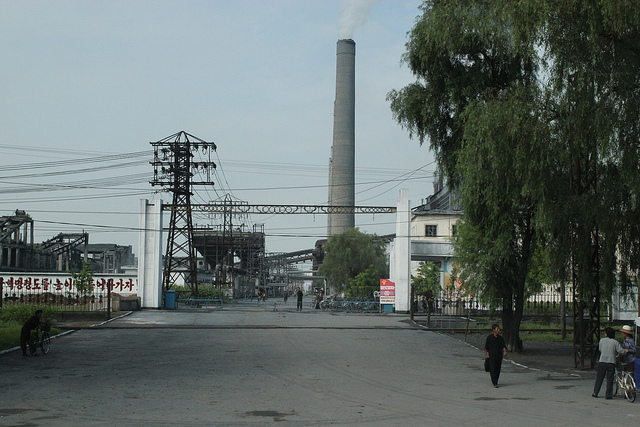
The entrance to the February 8 Vinylon Complex at Pinallon Station.

The Sŏho Line is used exclusively for passenger trains for commuters.

== Route ==
The pink background indicates that that section is electrified 762 mm (2 ft 6 in) narrow gauge.

Distance (km)								
Original		Current		Station Name		Former Name		
Total	S2S	Total	S2S	Transcribed	Chosŏn'gŭl (Hanja)	Transcribed	Chosŏn'gŭl (Hanja)	Connections (former)
0.0	0.0	0.0	0.0	Sŏhamhŭng (West Hamhŭng)	서함흥 (西咸興)			Sinhŭng Line
1.2	1.2	1.2	1.2	Sap'o	사포 (沙浦)			
3.5	2.3	3.5	2.3	Sangsu	상수 (上水)			
5.9	2.4	5.9	2.4	Sŏngch'ŏn	성천 (城川)			Pinallon Line
7.6	1.7	7.6	1.7	Hŭngdŏk	흥덕 (興德)	Pinallon	비날론 (-)	Pinallon Line
10.0	2.4	10.0	2.4	Unsong	운성 (雲城)			Pinallon Line
12.0	2.0	12.0	2.0	Ryongsŏng	룡성 (龍城)			Pinallon Line; branch to Hŭngnam
--	--	13.6	1.6	Hadŏk	하덕 (荷德)	Ch'ŏngiri	천기리 (天機里)	
15.6	3.6	--	--	Hŭngnam	흥남 (興南)			P'yŏngra Line
--	--	~~15.3~~	~~1.7~~	Naeho	내호 (內湖)			Closed.
--	--	17.6	2.3	Sŏho	서호 (西湖)	Sŏhojin	서호진 (西湖津)	P'yŏngra Line

== Rolling stock ==
The line uses Charyokkaengsang-class locomotives (자력갱생) originally built by Kim Chong-t'ae Electric Locomotive Works. They have 551 kW motors and haul a number of passenger cars. These locomotives underwent complete body replacement by the 8 February Vinylon Factory and the Hamhung Narrow Gauge Office in 2017 and received a blue and white exterior along with the reconstruction of the line. Previously, the locomotives were yellow and red. A total of 8 locomotives and 22 passenger cars which were overhauled.
