= 660 class =

660 class or Class 660 may refer to:

- ČD Class 660, electric multiple units
- Chōsen Railway Class 660, 2-6-2 steam locomotives
- New South Wales 660/760 class railcar
