= Chōsen Railway Class 700 =

0-8-0 steam locomotive

Type and origin
- Power type: Steam
- Builder: Hitachi
- Build date: 1927
Specifications
- Configuration
  - Whyte: 0-8-0T
- Gauge: 762 mm (2 ft 6 in)
- Driver dia.: 800 mm (31 in)
- Length: 8,937 mm (351.9 in)
- Width: 2,120 mm (83 in)
- Height: 3,190 mm (126 in)
- Total weight: 28.20 t (27.75 long tons)
Performance figures
- Tractive effort: 30.20 kN (6,790 lb_{f})
Career
- Operators: Chōsen Railway
- Class: Chōsen Railway: 700
- Delivered: 1927

The Class 700 was a class of 0-8-0T steam locomotives operated by the Chōsen Railway in colonial Korea, built by Hitachi of Japan.

Their fate after the Liberation and partition of Korea is unknown.
