= Chōsen Railway Class D =

B diesel locomotive

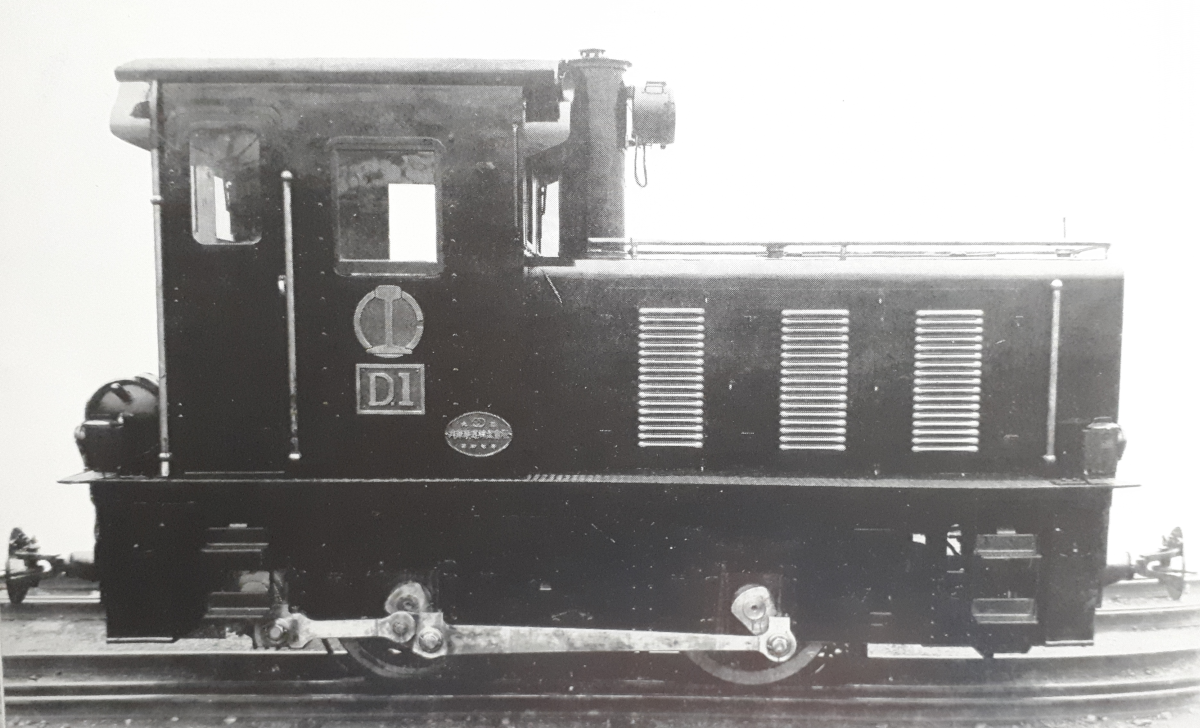
- Builder's photo of Chōsen Railway Class D no. D1
Type and origin
- Power type: Diesel
- Builder: Kisha Seizō
- Build date: 1932
- Total produced: 1
Specifications
- Configuration
  - UIC: B
- Gauge: 762 mm (2 ft 6 in)
- Loco weight: 12 t (12 long tons)
Performance figures
- Power output: 90 hp (67 kW)
Career
- Operators: Chōsen Railway
- Class: Chōsen Railway: D
- Number in class: 1
- Numbers: Chōsen Railway: D1
- Delivered: 1932

The Class D was a class consisting of a single diesel locomotive with B wheel arrangement operated by the Chōsen Railway in colonial Korea. It was one of the first diesel locomotives to operate on the Korean peninsula.

Its fate after the Liberation and partition of Korea is unknown.
