= Sinhung Line =

Railway line in North Korea

Sinhŭng Line

Overview
- Native name: 신흥선(新興線)
- Status: Operational
- Locale: South Hamgyŏng Province
- Termini: Hamhŭng; Pujŏnhoban
- Stations: 16

Service
- Type: Heavy rail, Passenger/Freight rail Regional rail
- Operator(s): Sinhŭng Railway (1923–1938); Chosen Railway (1938–1945); Korean State Railway (since 1945)
- Depot(s): Sinhŭng, Hamhŭng

History
- Opened: 10 June 1923 (Hamhŭng—Yŏnggwang); 25 August 1923 (Yŏnggwang—Changp'ung); 1 October 1926 (P'ungsang—Sinhŭng); 1 February 1928 (Sinhŭng—Songhŭng); 10 September 1932 (Songhŭng—Pujŏnhoban)

Technical
- Line length: 91.6 km (56.9 mi)
- Number of tracks: Single track
- Track gauge: 1,435 mm (4 ft 8 1/2 in) standard gauge (Hamhŭng – Sinhŭng); 762 mm (2 ft 6 in) (Sinhŭng – Pujŏnhoban)
- Electrification: 3000 V DC Overhead line Hamhŭng−Sinhŭng; 1500 V DC Overhead line Sinhŭng−Pujŏnhoban
Route map
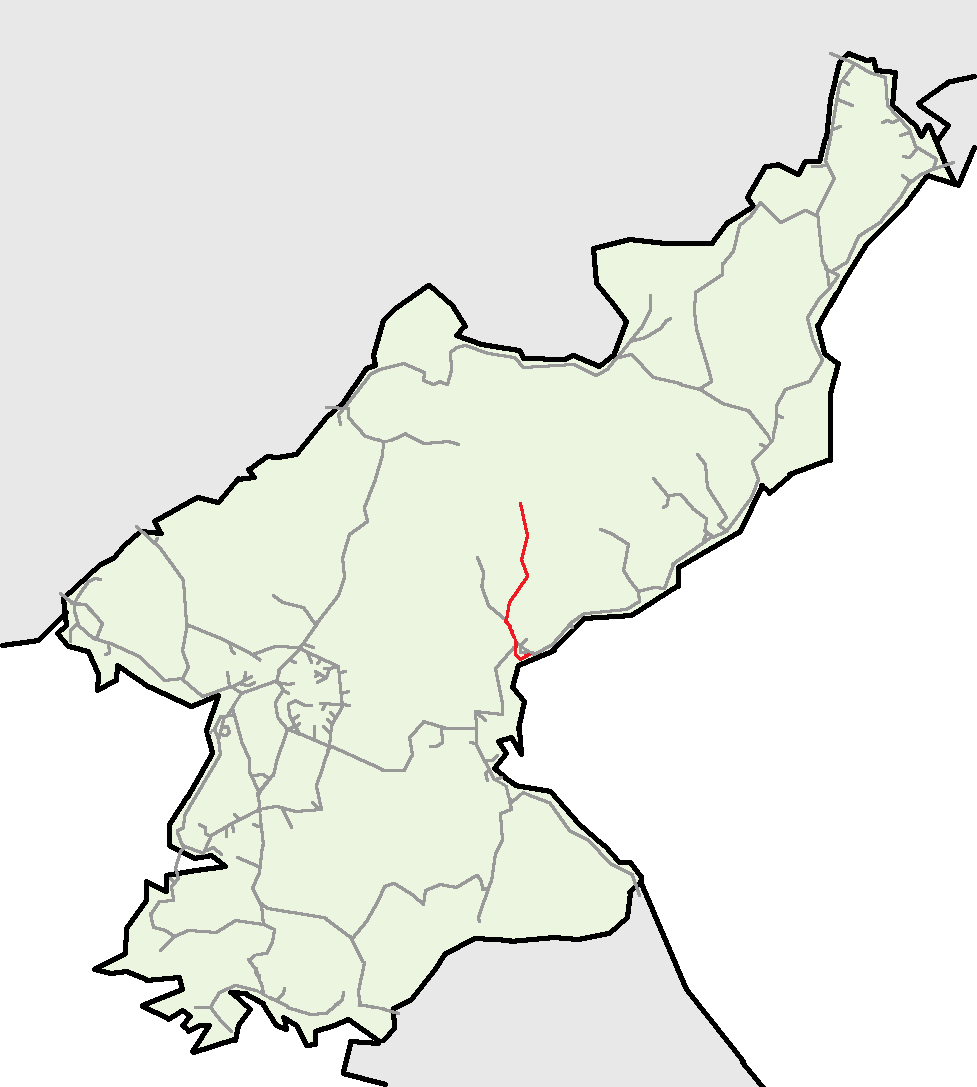

- Sinhung Line
- Hangul: 신흥선
- Hanja: 新興線
- RR: Sinheungseon
- MR: Sinhŭngsŏn

The Sinhŭng Line is an electrified 762 mm (2 ft 6 in) narrow gauge railway line of the Korean State Railway in South Hamgyŏng Province, North Korea, running from Hamhŭng (Hamhŭng-si) to Pujŏnhoban (Pujŏn-gun) on Lake Pujŏn via Sinhŭng (Sinhŭng-gun).

Between Hamhŭng and Sinhŭng, a distance of 40.9 km (25.4 mi), the line is standard gauge, but the remaining 50.6 km (31.4 mi) from Sinhŭng to the terminus at Pujŏnhoban is 762 mm (2 ft 6 in) narrow gauge; the narrow gauge section is also electrified.

Though primarily an industrial railway connecting to the Pujŏn River hydroelectric power plant, it also plays an important role in passenger transportation in the region. There is a 550 m (1,800 ft) section between Songhŭng and Pujŏllyŏng that is cable-hauled.

== History ==
During the Japanese colonial era, the privately owned Sinhŭng Railway built a network of narrow-gauge lines north of Hamhŭng. These were the Hamnam Line (not to be confused with the line of the same name of the Chosen Magnesite Development Railway, nowadays called Kŭmgol Line), to assist in the construction of the Pujŏn River hydroelectric power plant and to exploit forestry and other resources in the area. When complete, the Hamnam Line ran from Hamhŭng to Hamnam Sinhŭng (nowadays called simply Sinhŭng) via Oro (nowadays Yŏnggwang), with a branch from Oro to Sang'tong. Later, the Sinhŭng Railway opened the Songhŭng Line from Sinhŭng to Pujŏnhoban. The Sinhŭng Railway was bought by the Chosen Railway on 22 April 1938.

Between 1934 and 1936, the Sinhŭng Railway opened a line south from Hamhŭng, the Namhŭng Line.

Section	Opening date	Length	Line	Notes
Hamhŭng - Oro (Yŏnggwang)	10 June 1923	17.0 km (10.6 mi)	Hamnam Line	
Oro - Changpung	25 August 1923	11.2 km (7.0 mi)	Hamnam Line	Changp'ung Station subsequently closed.
West Hamhŭng Station	25 August 1923		Hamnam Line	
P'ungsang - Hamnam Sinhŭng (Sinhŭng)	1 October 1926	15.1 km (9.4 mi)	Hamnam Line	
Hamnam Sinhŭng - Hamnam Songhŭng (Songhŭng)	1 February 1928	20.0 km (12.4 mi)	Songhŭng Line	
Kilbong Station	12 April 1932		Songhŭng Line	Subsequently, closed.
Hamnam Songhŭng - Pujŏnhoban	10 September 1932	31.6 km (19.6 mi)	Songhŭng Line	
Chŏndong Station	16 October 1933		Hamnam Line	Subsequently, closed.

After the establishment of the DPRK and the nationalisation of its railways, the Hamnam Line was split up, with the Hamhŭng - Oro - Sinhŭng section becoming the Sinhŭng Line, and the Oro - Sangt'ong section becoming part of the Changjin Line. At the same time, the Songhŭng Line was merged into the Sinhŭng Line, extending it to its current length. Originally built entirely as a narrow gauge line, frequent accidents on the line led the Korean State Railway to convert the Hamhŭng—Sinhŭng to standard gauge for greater safety and increased transportation capacity. After the regauging of this section, West Hamhŭng station was disconnected from the Hamhŭng—Sinhŭng, leaving Hamhŭng as the only direct junction point with the Sŏho Line. Electrification of the line to Pujŏnhoban was completed in 1992.

== Services ==
=== Freight ===
The primary outbound freight shipped on the Sinhŭng Line is wood; potatoes and metals are also shipped out. Goods arriving onto the line from elsewhere include coal (anthracite and bituminous), fertiliser, aquatic products, grains and cement.

=== Passenger ===
Though primarily an industrial railway connecting to the Pujŏn River hydroelectric power plant, it also plays an important role in passenger transportation in the region. A pair of local passenger trains, 880/881, operate on the standard gauge section of this line between Hamhŭng and Sinhŭng; there are also passenger trains on the narrow-gauge section north of Sinhŭng.

== Route ==
A yellow background in the "Distance" box indicates that section of the line is not electrified; a pink background indicates that section is 762 mm (2 ft 6 in) narrow gauge; an orange background indicates that section is non-electrified narrow gauge.

Distance (km)		Station Name		Former Name		
Total	S2S	Transcribed	Chosŏn'gŭl (Hanja)	Transcribed	Chosŏn'gŭl (Hanja)	Connections (Former)
-3.9	0.0	Hamhŭng Choch'ajang	함흥 (咸興)			Pinallon Line
Although part of the P'yŏngra Line and not Sinhŭng Line, all (standard-gauge) Sinhŭng Line trains travel to/from Hamhŭng Choch'ajang.
0.0	3.9	Hamhŭng	함흥 (咸興)			P'yŏngra Line, Sŏho Line
~~1.0~~	~~1.0~~	Sŏhamhŭng (West Hamhŭng)	서함흥 (西咸興)			(Sŏho Line). No longer on Sinhŭng Line.
6.6	6.6	Kadam	가담 (-)	Hŭngsang	흥상 (興祥)	
~~9.3~~	~~2.7~~	Pumin	부민 (富民)			Closed.
12.3	3.0	Changhŭng	장흥 (長興)			
17.0	4.7	Yŏnggwang	영광 (榮光)	Oro	오로 (五老)	Changjin Line
25.9	8.9	P'ungsang	풍상 (豊上)			
~~28.2~~	~~2.3~~	Changp'ung	장풍 (長豊)			Closed.
30.7	4.8	Chŏndong	전동 (典洞)			Distance from P'ungsang.
33.5	2.8	Ch'ŏnbulsan	천불산 (千佛山)			
41.0; 0.0	7.5; 0.0	Sinhŭng	신흥 (新興)	Hamnam Sinhŭng	함남신흥 (咸南新興)	
~~2.8~~	~~2.8~~	Kilbong	길봉 (吉峰)			Closed.
6.9	4.1	Tonghŭng	동흥 (東興)			
13.1	6.2	Kyŏnghŭng	경흥 (慶興)			
14.9	1.8	Songha	송하 (松下)			
~~19.0~~	~~4.1~~	Hasonghŭng	하송흥 (下松興)			Closed.
20.0	1.0	Songhŭng	송흥 (松興)	Hamnam Songhŭng	함남송흥 (咸南松興)	
25.4	5.4	Paegamsan	백암산 (白岩山)			Service halt
27.1	1.7	Pujŏllyŏng	부전령 (赴戰嶺)			
33.7	6.6	Hamjiwŏn	함지원 (咸地院)			
40.0	3.8	Pujŏn	부전 (赴戰)			
47.9	7.9	Toan	도안 (道安)	Hamnam Toan	함남도안 (咸南道安)	
50.6	2.7	Pujŏnhoban	부전호반 (赴戰湖畔)			
