= Hamhung station =

Railway station in North Korea

Coordinates: 39.9119°N 127.5454°E

Hamhŭng 함흥

Korean name
- Hangul: 함흥역
- Hanja: 咸興驛
- Revised Romanization: Hamheung-yeok
- McCune–Reischauer: Hamhŭng-yŏk

General information
- Location: Yŏkchŏn 1-dong, Sŏngch'ŏngang-guyŏk, Hamhŭng-si, South Hamgyŏng; North Korea
- Owner: Korean State Railway
- Platforms: 4 (2 islands)
- Tracks: 8

History
- Opened: 15 December 1919
- Original company: Chosen Government Railway

Services
Preceding station	Korean State Railway	Following station
Chusŏ towards P'yŏngyang	P'yŏngra Line	Hamhŭng Chocha'jang towards Rajin
Kadam towards Sinhŭng	Sinhŭng Line (1435 mm)	Terminus
Terminus	Sŏho Line	Sohamhung towards Sŏho
Location

Hamhŭng station is a railway station in Yŏkchŏn 1-dong, Sŏngch'ŏngang-guyŏk, Hamhŭng city, South Hamgyŏng province, North Korea, located on the P'yŏngra Line of the Korean State Railway; it is also the starting point of the Sinhŭng Line and the Sŏho Line. A locomotive depot is located here, and there are spurs to the Hamhŭng Knitwear Factory and the Paekkŭmsan Combined Foodstuffs Factory in Haebit-tong, Sŏngch'ŏngang-guyŏk.

== History ==
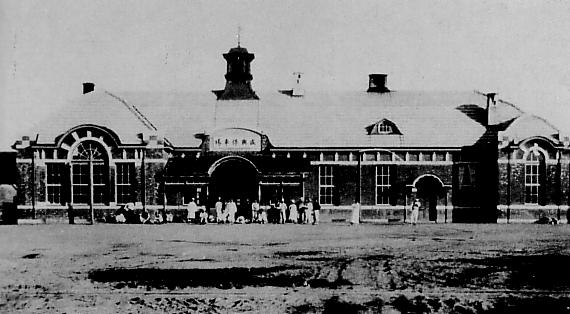
The original station building

The station was originally opened on 15 December 1919 by the Chosen Government Railway as part of the 69.5 km (43.2 mi) Yŏnghŭng (nowadays Kŭmya)–Hamhŭng section of the Hamgyŏng Line.
