= Gyeongdong Line =

Railway line in colonial Korea

Overview
- Native name: 경동선 (慶東線)
- Status: Divided (see text)
- Owner: Chōsen Light Railway (1917–1919); Chōsen Central Railway (1919–1923); Chōsen Railway (1923–1928)
- Locale: North Gyeongsang
- Termini: Daegu; Haksan Jangsaengpo
- Stations: 27

Service
- Type: Heavy rail, Regional rail Passenger/Freight
- Operator(s): Chōsen Light Railway; Chōsen Central Railway; Chōsen Railway

History
- Opened: 1917–1921

Technical
- Line length: 152.4 km (94.7 mi)
- Number of tracks: Single track
- Track gauge: 762 mm (2 ft 6 in)

The Gyeongdong Line (慶東線, Keitō-sen) was a 762 mm (2 ft 6.0 in) narrow gauge railway line of the Chōsen Railway (Chōtetsu) of colonial-era Korea, in North Gyeongsang Province.

== History ==
In January 1916, the privately owned Chōsen Light Railway began work on a new rail line from Daegu on the Chōsen Government Railway's Gyeongbu Line towards Pohang. The first section, 23.0 km (14.3 mi) from Daegu to Hayang, was opened on 1 November 1917. Over the following year, three new sections were opened, with Pohang being reached 364 days after the opening of the first section. On 20 May 1918, a 5.5 km (3.4 mi) extension from Hayang to Geumho was opened, followed by the 38.7 km (24.0 mi) segment from Geumho to Seoak on 1 September, and the final 38.2 km (23.7 mi) stretch to Pohang was opened on 31 October.

Work on a second line began around the same time that the main line was completed, and the first 11.5 km (7.1 mi) section, from Gyeongju to Bulguksa, was opened on 14 January 1919. Five months later, on 25 June 1919, a 2.0 km (1.2 mi) extension of the main line from Pohang to Haksan was opened, and on 27 September of the same year, the Chōsen Light Railway was renamed Chōsen Central Railway Co. Ltd.

Nothing changed until two years later, when the 29.9 km (18.6 mi) line from Bulguksa to Ulsan was completed on 25 October 1921; on 1 November, the Daegu–Haksan line was given the name Gupo Line, and the Gyeongju–Ulsan line was named Ulsan Line. On 1 September 1923, the Chōsen Central Railway merged with five other privately owned railway companies to form the Chōsen Railway, and at the same time, the Gupo Line and the Ulsan Line were merged, collectively being named the Gyeongdong Line.

On 1 July 1928, the Chōsen Government Railway purchased the Gyeongdong Line and renamed it Donghae Jungbu Line.

== Services ==
Initially, only mixed trains, with both passenger and freight cars, operated on the line; in 1922, there was one daily round trip between Daegu and Yeongcheon, four daily round trips between Yeongcheon and Pohang, four between Pohang and Haksan, eight between Seoak and Gyeongju, and three between Gyeongju and Ulsan. Dedicated passenger trains were introduced after the creation of the Chōsen Railway, with a single Daegu–Pohang return service being added to the schedule in 1923, followed by four return services between Daegu and Ulsan in 1926.

== Route ==
邱浦線 - 구포선 - Kyūho Line - Gupo Line
Distance		Station name				
Total; km	S2S; km	Transcribed, Korean	Transcribed, Japanese	Hunminjeongeum	Hanja/Kanji	Connections
0.0	0.0	Daegu	Taikyū	대구	大邱	Sentetsu Gyeongbu Line
5.4	5.4	Dongchon	Tōson	동촌	東村	
10.6	5.2	Ban'yawol	Han'yagetsu	반야월	半夜月	
16.7	6.1	Cheongcheon	Seisen	청천	淸泉	
23.0	6.3	Hayang	Kayō	하양	河陽	
28.5	5.5	Geumho	Kinko	금호	琴湖	
34.1	5.6	Yeongcheon	Eisen	영천	永川	
43.4	9.3	Impo	Rinpo	임포	林浦	
49.0	5.6	Ahwa	Akuwa	아화	阿火	
55.5	6.5	Geoncheon	Kansen	건천	乾川	
60.3	4.8	Gwangmyeong	Kōmyō	광명	光明	
67.2	6.9	Seoak	Seigaku	서악	西岳	
69.0	1.8	Gyeongju	Keishū	경주	慶州	Ulsan Line
75.7	6.7	Geumjang	Kinjō	금장	金丈	
84.1	8.4	Sabang	Shihō	사방	士方	
90.4	6.3	An'gang	Ankō	안강	安康	
96.8	6.4	Bujo	Fujo	부조	扶助	
101.4	4.6	Hyoja	Kōshi	효자	孝子	
105.4	4.0	Pohang	Hokō	포항	浦項	
107.4	2.0	Haksan	Kakuzan	학산	鶴山	

蔚山線 - 울산선 - Urusan Line - Ulsan Line
Distance		Station name				
Total; km	S2S; km	Transcribed, Korean	Transcribed, Japanese	Hunminjeongeum	Hanja/Kanji	Connections
0.0	0.0	Gyeongju	Keishū	경주	慶州	Gupo Line
6.2	6.2	Dongbang	Tōhō	동방	東方	
11.5	5.3	Bulguksa	Bukkokuji	불국사	佛國寺	
19.9	8.4	Ipsil	Nyūshitsu	입실	入室	
23.7	3.8	Mohwa	Mōka	모화	毛火	
30.9	7.2	Hogye	Kokei	호계	虎溪	
38.0	7.1	Byeongyeong	Heiei	병영	兵營	
41.4	3.4	Ulsan	Urusan	울산	蔚山	
45.0	3.6	Jangsaengpo	Chōseiho	장생포	長生浦	
