= Chōsen Railway Class 660 =

2-6-2 steam locomotive

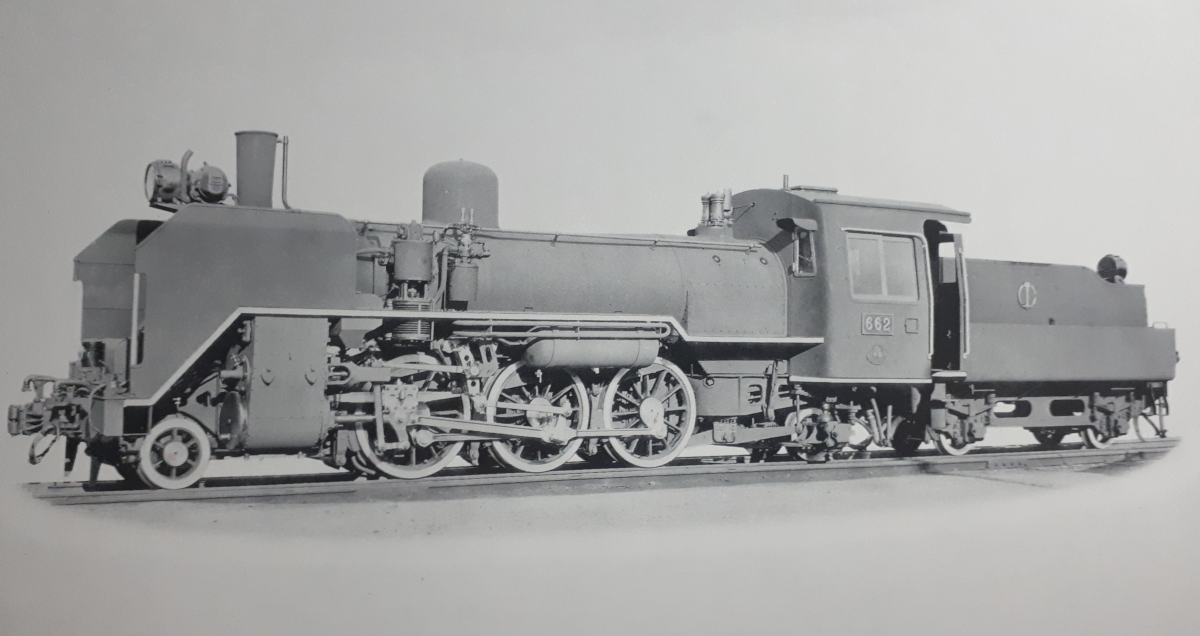
- Builder's photo of Chōsen Railway Class 660 no. 662
Type and origin
- Power type: Steam
- Builder: Kisha Seizō, Nippon Sharyō
- Build date: 1937
- Total produced: 6?
Specifications
- Configuration
  - Whyte: 2-6-2
- Gauge: 762 mm (2 ft 6 in)
- Driver dia.: 1,100 mm (43 in)
- Length: 13,342 mm (525.3 in)
- Width: 2,300 mm (91 in)
- Height: 3,000 mm (120 in)
- Cylinder size: 340 mm × 400 mm (13 in × 16 in)
Performance figures
- Maximum speed: >70 km/h (43 mph)
- Tractive effort: 30.21 kN (6,790 lb_{f})
Career
- Operators: Chōsen Railway; Korean State Railway; Korean National Railroad
- Class: Chōsen Railway: 660
- Number in class: 6?
- Numbers: Chōsen Railway: 660-665?
- Delivered: 1937

The Class 660 was a class of steam tender locomotives with 2-6-2 wheel arrangement operated by the Chōsen Railway (Chōtetsu) in colonial Korea.

== Description ==
With the completion of the Ryesong River bridge in 1932, the importance of Chōtetsu's Hwanghae Line grew significantly, and by 1935 the company was looking at the possibility - unusual for a narrow-gauge railway - of running limited express trains on the line between Gyeongseong and Haeju. Tests were conducted in 1935 with a Class 630 locomotive, in which it was found that speeds of 70 km/h (43 mph) could safely be reached (the engine's drivers, with a diameter of 940 mm (37 in), reached a rotational speed of 400 rpm).

As a result of the tests, Chōtetsu ordered a 2-6-2 tender locomotive with a driver diameter of 1,100 mm (43 in) to pull express trains at 70 km/h (43 mph) through Hwanghae Province. Designated Class 660, six were built at the end of 1937 by Kisha Seizō (road numbers 660-662, works numbers 1490-1492) and Nippon Sharyō (road numbers 663-665, works numbers 501-503) of Japan.

== Postwar ==
After the Liberation and partition of Korea, these locomotives were divided between the Korean State Railway of North Korea and the Korean National Railroad of South Korea. None are known to survive.
