= Ongjin station =

Railway station in North Korea

Ongjin 옹진

Korean name
- Hangul: 옹진역
- Hanja: 甕津驛
- Revised Romanization: Ongjin-yeok
- McCune–Reischauer: Ongjin-yŏk

General information
- Location: Ongjin-ŭp, Ongjin-gun, South Hwanghae; North Korea
- Coordinates: 37.9369°N 125.3679°E
- Owner: Korean State Railway
- Platforms: 2 (1 island)
- Tracks: 2 + 1 siding

History
- Opened: 19 May 1937
- Original company: Chosen Railway

Services
| Preceding station | Korean State Railway | Following station |
|---|---|---|
| Terminus | Ongjin Line | Raengjŏng towards Haeju Ch'ŏngnyŏn |
Location

Ongjin station is a railway station in Ongjin-ŭp, Ongjin County, South Hwanghae Province, North Korea, on the Ongjin Line of the Korean State Railway.

== History ==
Ongjin Station was opened by the Chosen Railway on 19 May 1937, along with the rest of the Ch'wiya–Ongjin section of the Ongjin Line.
