= Ongjin Line =

Railway line in North Korea

Overview
- Native name: 옹진선(甕津線)
- Status: Operational
- Owner: Chosen Railway (1936–1944); Chosen Government Railway (1944–1945); Korean National Railroad (1945–1950); Korean State Railway (since 1945)
- Locale: South Hwanghae
- Termini: Haeju Ch'ŏngnyŏn; Ongjin

History
- Opened: Stages between 1936-1937

Technical
- Line length: 43.5 km (27.0 mi)
- Track gauge: 1,435 mm (4 ft 8 1/2 in) standard gauge
- Old gauge: 762 mm (2 ft 6 in)
Route map
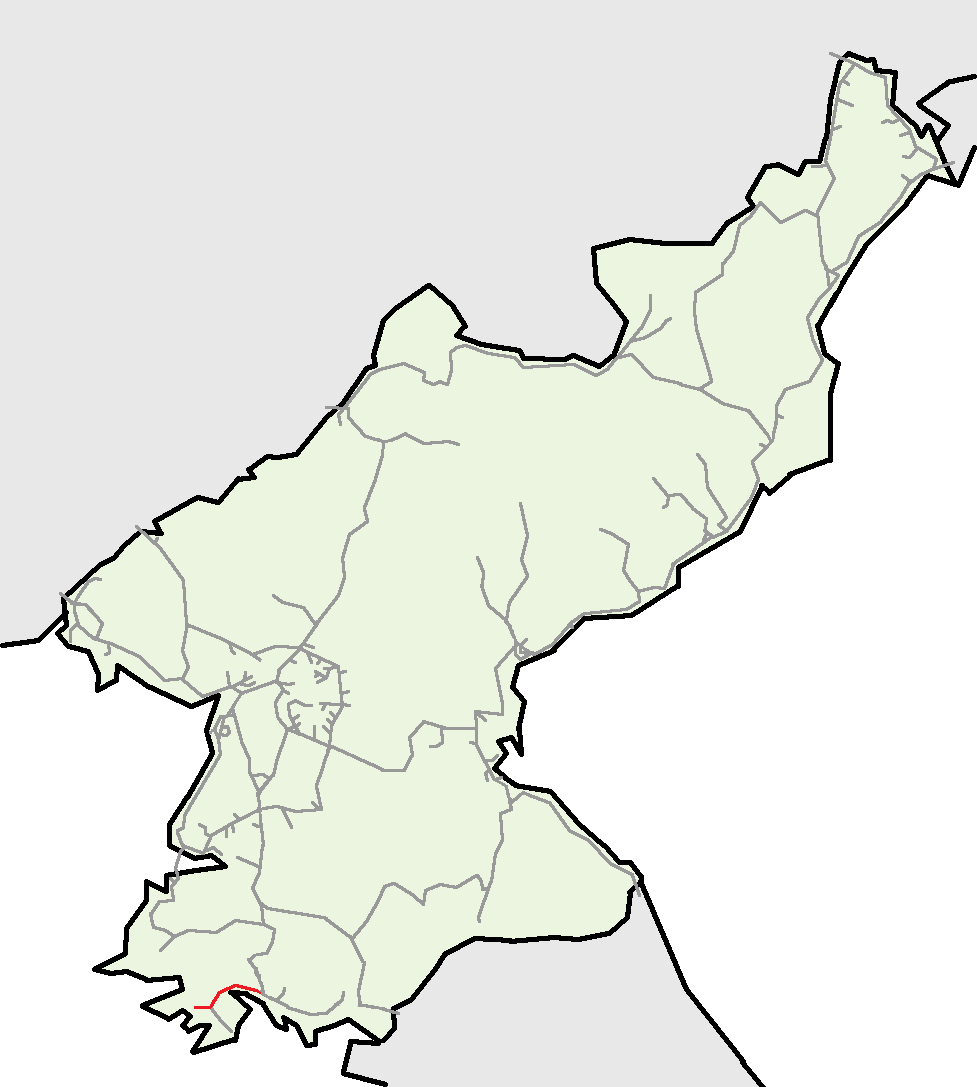

- Ongjin Line
- Hangul: 옹진선
- Hanja: 甕津線
- RR: Ongjinseon
- MR: Ongjinsŏn

The Ongjin Line is a partially electrified standard-gauge secondary line of the Korean State Railway in South Hwanghae Province, North Korea, running from Haeju on the Hwanghae Ch'ŏngnyŏn Line to Ongjin.

== History ==
Established in 1923 through the merger of six smaller railways, by the mid 1930s the Chosen Railway (Chōtetsu) had become the largest privately owned railway in colonial Korea, and had built an extensive network of 762 mm (30.0 in) narrow gauge rail lines in the Hwanghae region. By the end of 1935 this Hwanghae Line network ran Sariwŏn—Samgang—Sugyo, Samgang—East Haeju—Haeju Port, and Haeju—East Haeju—Tosŏng.

The beginnings of what would eventually become the Ongjin Line were laid in 1931, when the line from East Haeju to Haeju Port at Ryongdangp'o was opened on 12 November of that year, and on 1 July 1933, when Haeju Station was opened following the completion of the line west from East Haeju. On 11 May 1934, Sŏbyŏn Station was opened on that segment, which was later renamed Tongp'o. Construction of the Ongjin Line proper began from Haeju Station, with the first section to Ch'wiya (nowadays called Pyŏksŏng) opened on 11 December 1936. In May 1937, two new stretches were opened: a short (0.7 km (0.43 mi)) section from Tongp'o to Chŏngdo on the 10th, and from Ch'wiya to Ongjin on the 19th.

Chōtetsu sold the Hwanghae Line network to the Chosen Government Railway on 1 April 1944, which absorbed and then split the network into separate lines, with the Haeju—Ongjin line becoming known as the Ongjin Line, and the Tongp'o—Chŏngdo line becoming the Chŏngdo Line; the East Haeju—Tongp'o—Haeju Port section was made part of the Samgang—East Haeju Sahae Line.

Following the end of the Pacific War, the subsequent partition of Korea left the Ongjin Line divided between the Soviet and American zones of occupation, with the 38th parallel splitting the line near Chayang Station. After the end of the Korean War the entire line was within the DPRK. After the conversion of the Sariwŏn—Haeju Hwanghae Ch'ŏngnyŏn Line to standard gauge in 1958, the Ongjin and Chŏngdo Lines were likewise regauged, during which the East Haeju—Haeju—West Haeju line running through the middle of the city was closed. A new passenger station for Haeju, Haeju Ch'ŏngnyŏn Station was opened immediately adjacent to the East Haeju freight yards, along with a new line from Wangsin (formerly Tongp'o) to West Haeju. Electrification of the East Haeju—Wangsin—West Haeju section of the line was completed by April 1982.

== Services ==
Commuter trains run on the line from West Haeju to Hakhyŏn on the Hwanghae Ch'ŏngnyŏn Line via Haeju Ch'ŏngnyŏn and Changbang.

== Route ==
A yellow background in the "Distance" box indicates that section of the line is not electrified.

| Distance (km) | | Station Name | | Former Name | | |
| Total | S2S | Transcribed | Chosŏn'gŭl (Hanja) | Transcribed | Chosŏn'gŭl (Hanja) | Connections |
|---|---|---|---|---|---|---|
| 0.0 | 0.0 | Haeju Ch'ŏngnyŏn | 해주청년 (海州靑年) | | | Hwanghae Ch'ŏngnyŏn Line via East Haeju |
| ~~0.0~~ | ~~0.0~~ | Haeju | 해주 (海州) | | | Closed 1958 |
| ~~1.0~~ | ~~1.0~~ | Ch'ŏngyang | 청양 (靑陽) | | | Closed 1958 |
| 2.9 | 2.9 | Wangsin | 왕신 (王神) | Tongp'o | 동포 (東浦) | Chŏngdo Line |
| 7.0 | 4.1 | West Haeju (Sŏhaeju) | 서해주 (西海州) | Munjŏng | 문정 (文井) | |
| ~~10.8~~ | ~~3.7~~ | Sŏsŏk | 서석 (西席) | | | Closed |
| 19.3 | 8.5 | Pyŏksŏng | 벽성 (碧城) | Ch'wiya | 취야 (翠野) | |
| ~~22.3~~ | ~~3.0~~ | Kukpong | 국봉 (菊峰) | | | Closed |
| | | Chayang | 자양 (紫陽) | | | Closed |
| 26.8 | 4.5 | Changdun | 장둔 (長屯) | | | |
| 34.2 | 7.4 | Sin'gangryŏng | 신강령 (新康翎) | | | Pup'o Line |
| ~~40.1~~ | ~~5.9~~ | Raengjŏng | 랭정 (冷井) | | | Closed |
| 43.5 | 3.4 | Ongjin | 옹진 (甕津) | | | |
