= Gyeongnam Line =

Railway line in colonial Korea

Overview
- Native name: 경남선 (慶南線)
- Status: Merged (see text)
- Owner: Chōsen Southern Railway (1923); Chōsen Railway (1923–1931)
- Locale: South Gyeongsang
- Termini: Masan; Jinju
- Stations: 14

Service
- Type: Heavy rail, Regional rail Passenger/Freight
- Operator(s): Sinheung Railway; Chōsen Railway

History
- Opened: 1923–1925

Technical
- Line length: 66.9 km (41.6 mi)
- Number of tracks: Single track
- Track gauge: 1,435 mm (4 ft 8 1/2 in) standard gauge

The Gyeongnam Line (慶南線, Keinan-sen) was a railway line of the Chōsen Railway (Chōtetsu) of colonial-era Korea, located in South Gyeongsang Province.

== History ==
On 13 July 1918, the privately owned Chōsen Southern Railway was granted a concession to build a railway line from Songjeongni (now Gwangju Songjeong) to Masan, but it wasn't until June 1922 that work on the first section, from Masan to Jinju, began. The line was not yet opened when the Chōsen Southern Railway merged with five other privately owned railways to create the Chōsen Railway on 1 September 1923; it was only three months after the merger, on 1 December 1923, that the first section, 24.8 km (15.4 mi) from Masan to Gunbuk, was opened, under the name Gyeongnam Line. The remaining 40.6 km (25.2 mi) section to Jinju was opened on 15 June 1925. On 1 April 1931, the state-owned Chōsen Government Railway bought the Gyeongnam Line, merging it with its own Masan Line to create the Gyeongjeon Nambu Line running from Samnangjin to Jinju.

== Route ==
慶南線 - 경남선 - Keinan Line - Gyeongnam Line
Distance		Station name				
Total; km	S2S; km	Transcribed, Korean	Transcribed, Japanese	Hunminjeongeum	Hanja/Kanji	Connections
0.0	0.0	Masan	Masan	마산	馬山	Sentetsu Masan Line, Sentetsu Masanhang Line
6.3	6.3	Jungni	Chūri	중리	中里	
13.5	7.2	San'in	Sanjin	산인	山仁	
17.5	4.0	Ham'an	Kan'an	함안	咸安	
26.3	8.8	Gunbuk	Gunhoku	군북	郡北	
29.9	3.6	Wonbuk	Inhoku	원북	院北	
35.7	5.8	Pyeongchon	Heison	평촌	坪村	
40.3	4.6	Jinju-Sumokwon	Shinshū-Jumokuen	진주수목원	晉州樹木園	
42.1	1.8	Banseong	Hanjō	반성	班城	
48.0	5.9	Jinseong	Shinjō	진성	晉城	
51.0	3.0	Galcheon	Kasson	갈촌	葛村	
57.0	6.0	Nammunsan	Nanbunzan	남문산	南文山	
62.2	5.2	Gaeyang	Kaiyō	개양	開陽	
66.9	4.7	Jinju	Shinshū	진주	晉州	
