= Hungnam station =

Railway station in North Korea

Hungnam station 흥남

General information
- Location: Hungnam district, Hamhung; South Hamgyong Province; North Korea
- Coordinates: 39°50′34″N 127°38′08″E
- Lines: Pyongra Line; Pinallon Line (freight)
- Platforms: 4
- Tracks: 2

Services
| Preceding station | Korean State Railway | Following station |
|---|---|---|
| Changhung towards P'yŏngyang | P'yŏngra Line | Sŏho towards Rajin |
Location

Hŭngnam station is a railway station in North Korea. It is located on the P'yŏngra Line of the Korean State Railway.
