= Chōsen Railway Class 630 =

2-6-2 steam locomotive

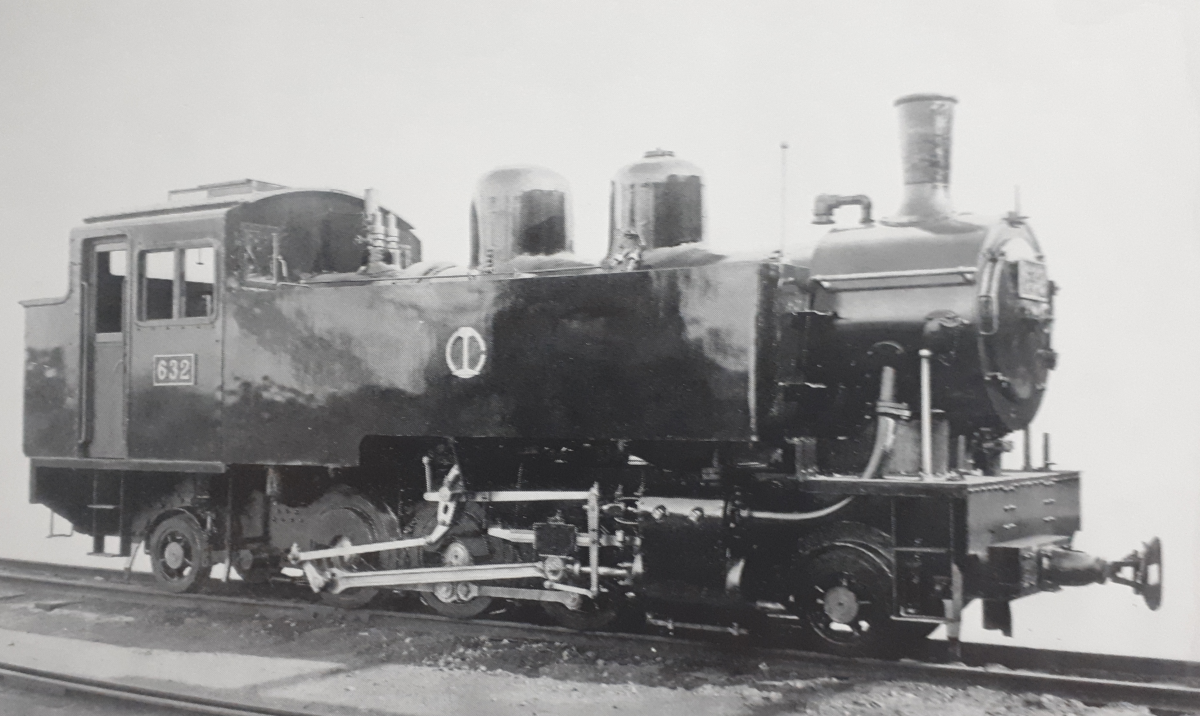
- Builder's photo of Chōsen Railway Class 630 no. 632
Type and origin
- Power type: Steam
- Builder: Kisha Seizō, Nippon Sharyō
- Build date: 1930
- Total produced: 5
Specifications
- Configuration
  - Whyte: 2-6-2T
- Gauge: 762 mm (2 ft 6 in)
- Driver dia.: 940 mm (37 in)
- Length: 8,634 mm (339.9 in)
- Width: 2,134 mm (84.0 in)
- Height: 3,150 mm (124 in)
- Total weight: 28.50 t (28.05 long tons)
Performance figures
- Tractive effort: 32.46 kN (7,300 lb_{f})
Career
- Operators: Chōsen Railway; Korean State Railway
- Class: Chōsen Railway: 630
- Number in class: >5
- Numbers: Chōsen Railway: 630-63?
- Delivered: 1930

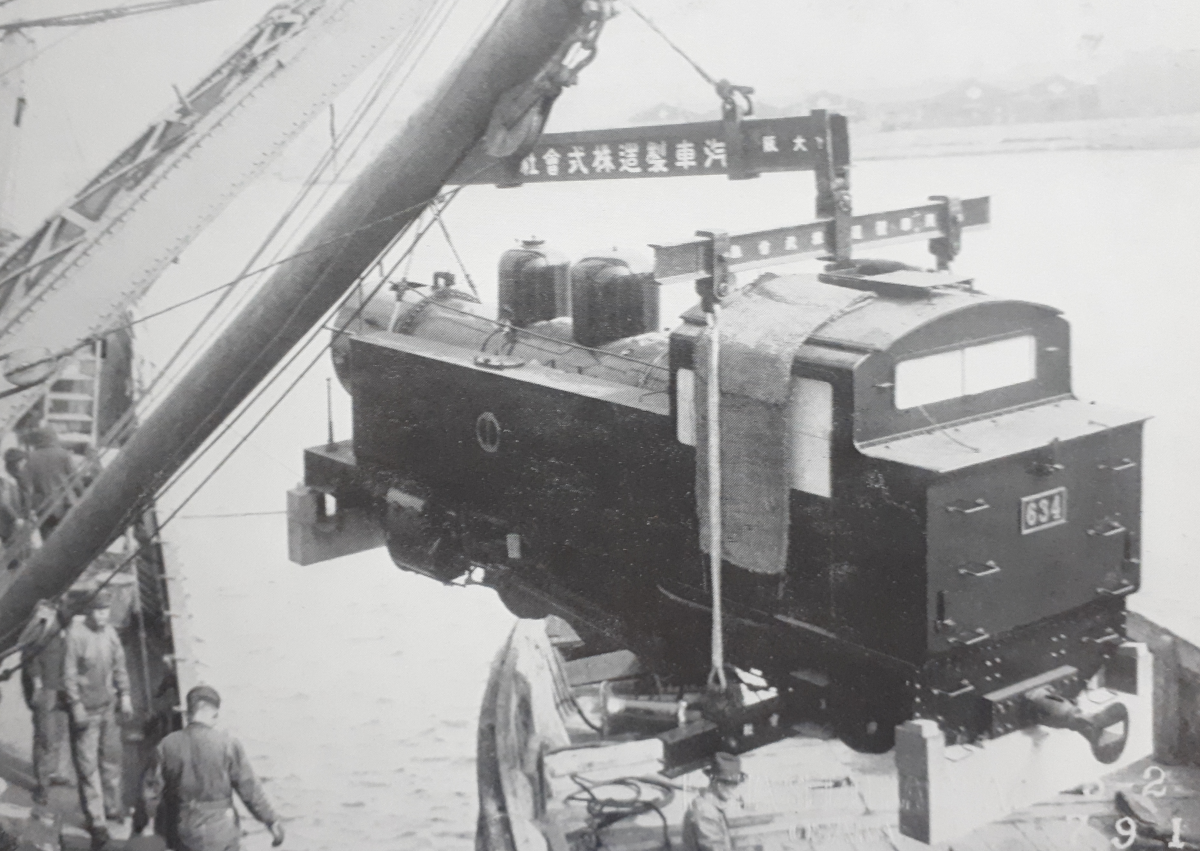
Engine number 634 being loaded onto a ship for delivery.

The Class 630 was a class of steam tank locomotives with 2-6-2 wheel arrangement operated by the Chōsen Railway in colonial Korea. The first five were built for the company by Kisha Seizō of Japan for use on the railway's Hwanghae Line; they were numbered 630 through 634 (works numbers 1113-1117); these were joined by an unknown number built by Nippon Sharyō in the same year.

After the Liberation and partition of Korea, these locomotives were taken over by the Korean State Railway of North Korea, and were likely scrapped after the conversion of the Hwanghae Line network to standard gauge in 1973. Their KSR numbering is unknown.

== Class 655 ==
The Class 655 was a class of three 2-6-2T tank locomotives built by Kisha Seizō for the Chōsen Railway in 1935 (works numbers 1302-1304). Numbered 655 through 657, they were nearly identical to the Class 630 engines.

Like the Class 630, these were taken over by the Korean State Railway in 1947, but their subsequent fate is unknown.
