= Chōsen Railway Class 900 =

2-8-2 steam locomotive

Chōsen Railway Class 900 Korean National Railroad Class Hyeogi11 (혀기11)
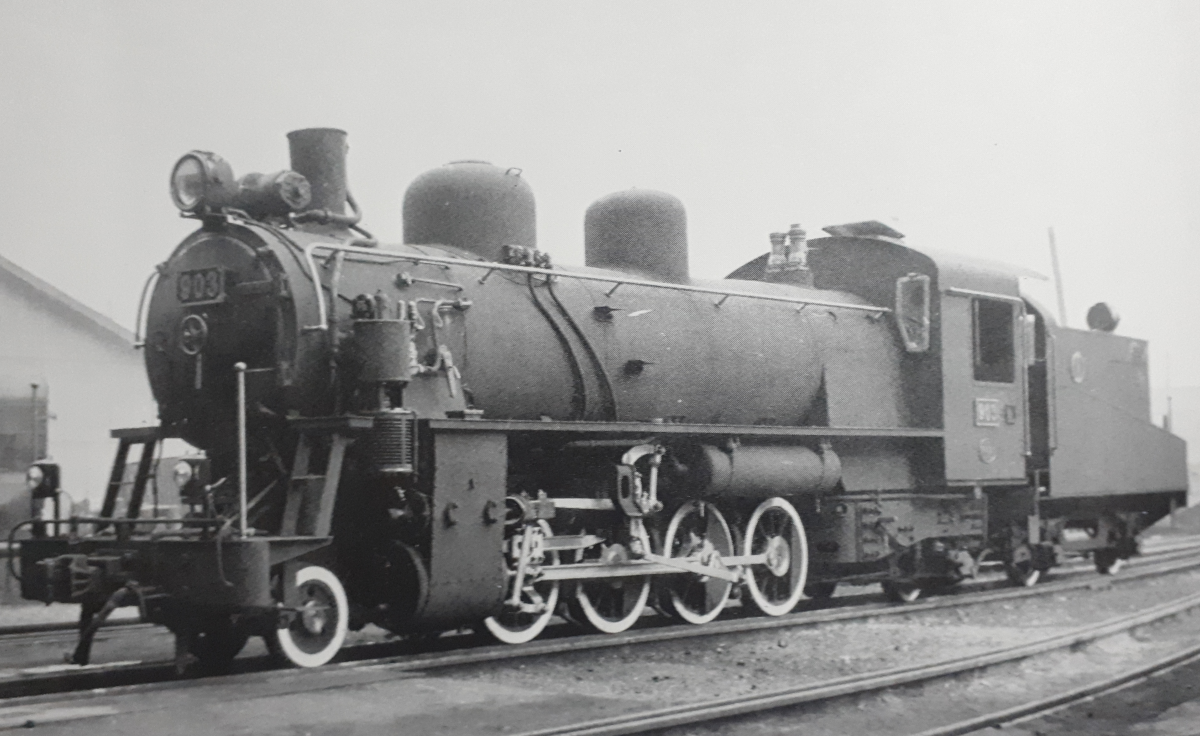
- Builder's photo of Chōsen Railway Class 900 no. 903
Type and origin
- Power type: Steam
- Designer: Takao Takada
- Builder: Kisha Seizō, Nippon Sharyō, Hitachi
- Build date: 1937, 1944
- Total produced: 15
Specifications
- Configuration
  - Whyte: 2-8-2
- Gauge: 762 mm (2 ft 6 in)
- Driver dia.: 900 mm (35 in)
- Minimum curve: 40 m (130 ft)
- Length: 14,529 mm (572.0 in)
- Width: 2,280 mm (90 in)
- Height: 3,200 mm (130 in)
- Total weight: 54.90 t (54.03 long tons)
- Firebox
  - Grate area: 2.1 m^{2} (23 sq ft)
- Cylinder size: 380 mm × 450 mm (15 in × 18 in)
Performance figures
- Maximum speed: 50 km/h (31 mph)
- Tractive effort: 48.25 kN (10,850 lb_{f})
Career
- Operators: Chōsen Railway; Korean State Railway; Korean National Railroad
- Class: Chōsen Railway: 900; KSR: ? KNR: 혀기11
- Number in class: 15
- Numbers: Chōsen Railway: 900-914
- Delivered: 1937: 900-909; 1944: 910-914
- Preserved: 4

The Class 900 was a class of steam tender locomotives for freight trains with 2-8-2 wheel arrangement operated by the Chōsen Railway (Chōtetsu) in colonial Korea. They were the largest 2-8-2 steam locomotives ever built for 762 mm (30.0 in) narrow-gauge railways.

== Description ==
After the completion of the Ryesong River bridge in 1932, Chōtetsu's Hwanghae Line network took on greater significance as a direct route between Gyeongseong and Haeju, capital of Hwanghae Province, was opened. As a result, the increased production of rice, iron ore, and limestone, coupled with the development of Haeju Port, led to a dramatic increase in traffic volumes. This led to many proposals to convert the line to standard gauge. Since this would entail enormous costs and years of work, it was decided to further increase the transportation capacity of the narrow-gauge line. To this end, studies were conducted to determine the largest possible size a 762mm narrow-gauge locomotive could be, result in the design of what would become the world's largest 2-8-2 tender locomotive for 762 mm (30.0 in) narrow gauge.

In charge of the design team assigned to the project was Takao Takada, for whom this was his maiden project, and who had numerous challenges to address. To allow for the use of low-quality lignite with a calorific value of 4,500 kcal (19,000 kJ), the firegrate area was made 2.1 m^{2} (23 sq ft) - a size comparable to that of the Japanese Government Railways' Class 9600 engines; naturally, this made the firebox wider than on other narrow-gauge locomotives. Because of the narrow gauge, the position of the boiler could not be raised. Since the space between the main frame is also narrow, cast-steel cross beams were inserted between the main frame and the rear frame, which gave more space to install the firebox. This was the first time this technique was used by a Japanese manufacturer.

Despite having a very long wheelbase, the Class 900 could pass through curves of 40 m (130 ft) radius. To accomplish this, the leading truck was given a movement range of 140 mm (5.5 in) to each side, the first set of drivers had a lateral movement range of 10 mm (0.39 in), and the flanges of the third set of drivers were 5 mm (0.20 in) narrower than the others. To ensure that this would allow the locomotive to clear a curve of such small diameter, at the suggestion of Kisha Seizō chairman Yasujirō Shima, a full-size wooden mockup of the locomotive was built and tested on a curved track.

The first seven engines, numbered 900 through 906 (works numbers 1441-1447), entered service in March 1937, and the results were found to be very good - water and coal consumption was low, and it could smoothly haul a train over 250 t (250 LT) at 50 km/h (31 mph). These were joined by three more built in the same year by Nippon Sharyō, numbers 907 through 909. In 1944, a further four were added, two from Kisha Seizō (numbers 910–911, works numbers 2353-2354) and three from Hitachi (numbers 912-914). Locomotives of this design were later built by Nippon Sharyō for the Taiwan Railway Bureau for use on the Taitung Line.

== Postwar ==
After the Liberation and partition of Korea, these locomotives were divided between the Korean State Railway of North Korea and the Korean National Railroad of South Korea. The three Hitachi-built units are known to have operated with the KNR, which designated them 혀기11 (Hyegi11) class and numbered 혀기11-12(Hyegi11-12), 혀기11-13(Hyegi11-13) and 혀기11-14(Hyegi11-14); all three are preserved.

== Preserved examples ==
- Hyegi 11-12, at the Samsung Transportation Museum
- Hyegi 11-13, at Korail Railroad Museum
- Hyegi 11-14, at Yongpyong Resort
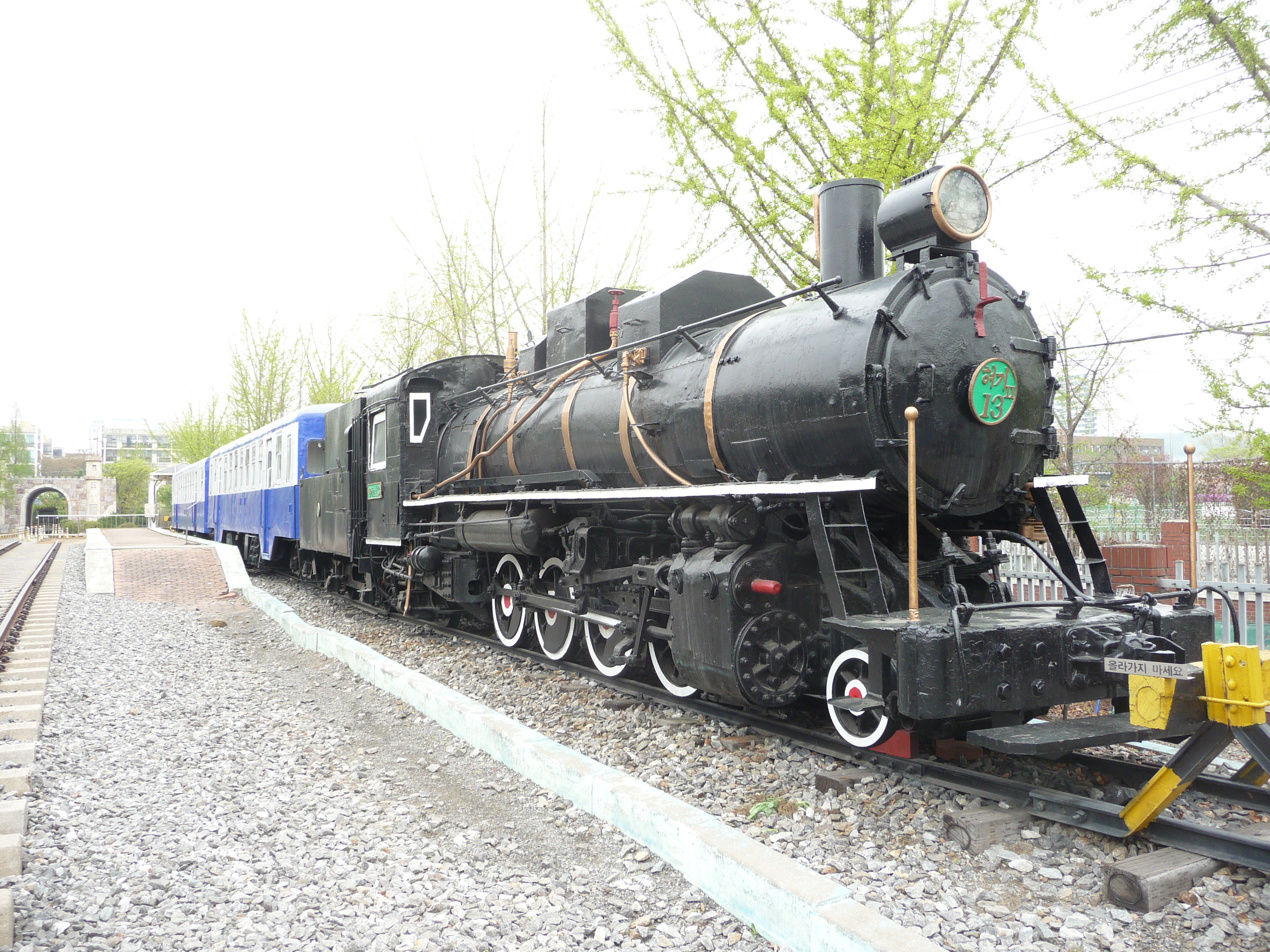
Hyegi 11-13
