= Pinallon Line =

Railway line in North Korea

Overview
- Other name: Vinylon Line
- Native name: 비날론선
- Status: Operational
- Owner: Korean State Railway
- Locale: Hamhŭng-si
- Termini: Hamhŭng Choch'ajang; Hŭngnam
- Stations: 7

Service
- Type: Heavy rail, Freight rail

History
- Opened: May 1961

Technical
- Line length: 14.1 km (8.8 mi)
- Number of tracks: Single track
- Track gauge: 1,435 mm (4 ft 8 1/2 in) standard gauge

- Pinallon Line
- Hangul: 비날론선
- Hanja: 비날론線
- RR: Binallonseon
- MR: Pinallonsŏn

The Pinallon Line or Vinylon Line is an electrified, freight-only industrial railway line of the Korean State Railway in Hamhŭng, South Hamgyŏng, North Korea, running from Hamhung marshalling yard to Hŭngnam via the February 8 Vinylon Complex in Hŭngnam.

It runs parallel to the narrow-gauge Sŏho Line for most of its length.

== History ==
The Pinallon Line was opened by the Korean State Railway in May 1961, when the February 8 Vinylon Complex was opened, as the existing narrow-gauge Sŏho Line was insufficient to meet the freight-hauling requirements of the industrial complex.

== Services ==
With the narrow-gauge Sŏho Line handling the passenger traffic, primarily workers at the various industries located along the line, the Pinallon Line transports only the freight heading to and from the various industries located along the line.

These industries include:

- the February 8 Vinylon Complex (via Sŏngch'ŏngang and Pinallon stations),
- the Hŭngnam Pharmaceutical Factory (via Sŏngch'ŏngang Station),
- the Hŭngnam Silicate Brick Factory (via Sŏngch'ŏngang and Unjung stations),
- the Hamhŭng Thermal Power Plant (via Unjung Station),
- the Ryongsŏng Machine Complex (via Ryongsŏng Station),
- the Hŭngnam Smelter (via Ryongsŏng),
- Hŭngnam Port
- the Hŭngnam Fertiliser Complex (via Ryongsŏng and Hŭngnam stations),

as well as several other smaller enterprises.

== Route ==
A yellow background in the "Distance" box indicates that section of the line is not electrified.

Distance (km)		Station Name		Former Name		
Total	S2S	Transcribed	Chosŏn'gŭl (Hanja)	Transcribed	Chosŏn'gŭl (Hanja)	Connections
0.0	0.0	Hamhŭng Choch'ajang	함흥조차 (咸興操車)			P'yŏngra Line
3.4	3.4	Sŏngch'ŏngang	성천강 (城川江)			Sŏho Line
5.7	2.3	Pinallon (Vinylon)	비날론 (-)			Sŏho Line
7.6	1.9	Unjung	운중 (雲中)			Sŏho Line
9.6	2.0	Ryongsŏng	룡성 (龍城)			Sŏho Line
11.2	1.6	Hŭngnamhang (Hŭngnam Port)	흥남항 (興南港)			
14.1	2.9	Hŭngnam	흥남 (興南)			Sŏho Line, P'yŏngra Line
