= Unbit station =

Railway station in North Korea

Ŭnbit 은빛

Korean name
- Hangul: 은빛역
- Hanja: 銀빛驛
- Revised Romanization: Eunbit-yeok
- McCune–Reischauer: Ŭnbit-yŏk

General information
- Location: Pugŏ-dong, Paech'ŏn-gun, South Hwanghae; North Korea
- Owner: Korean State Railway
- Platforms: 1
- Tracks: 2

History
- Opened: 1971

Services
Preceding station	Korean State Railway	Following station
Paech'ŏn towards East Haeju	Paech'ŏn Line	Terminus
Location

Ŭnbit station is a railway station in Pugŏ-dong, Paech'ŏn County, South Hwanghae Province, North Korea, on the Paech'ŏn Line of the Korean State Railway.

== History ==
Ŭnbit station was opened by the Korean State Railway in 1971, along with the rest of the Paech'ŏn–Ŭnbit section of the former Tohae Line.
