= Sinhung County =

Sinhung County 신흥군
- County

Korean transcription(s)
  - Hanja: 新興郡
  - McCune-Reischauer: Sinhŭng kun
  - Revised Romanization: Sinheung-gun
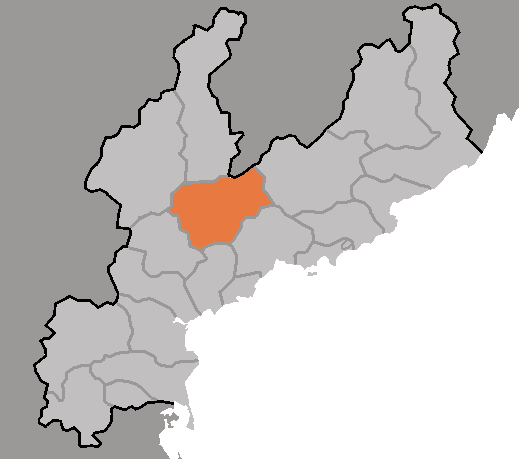
- Map of South Hamgyong showing the location of Sinhung
- Country: North Korea
- Province: South Hamgyong Province
- Administrative divisions: 1 ŭp, 3 workers' districts, 21 ri

Area
  - Total: 1,127 km^{2} (435 sq mi)

Population (2008)
  - Total: 104,002
  - Density: 92.28/km^{2} (239.0/sq mi)

Sinhŭng is a mountainous county in South Hamgyŏng province, North Korea. In 2008, Sinhŭng had a population of 104,002.

== Geography ==
It is traversed by the Hamgyŏng and Palbong ranges. The highest point is Chailbong. There are also lowland plains, where the temperatures are quite different from the mountains. The chief streams are the Sangch'ŏn and Pujŏn Rivers.

== Administrative divisions ==
Sinhŭng county is divided into 1 ŭp (town), 3 rodongjagu (workers' districts) and 21 ri (villages):

- Sinhŭng-ŭp
- Palch'ŏl-lodongjagu
- Puhŭng-rodongjagu
- Sinhŭng-rodongjagu
- Chungp'yŏng-ri
- Ch'angsŏ-ri
- Ch'uksang-ri
- Hawŏnch'ŏl-li
- Hŭngbong-ri
- Hŭnggyŏng-ri
- Kilbong-ri
- Kiril-li
- Kyŏnghŭng-ri
- Pansŏng-ri
- Puyŏl-li
- Sangwŏnch'ŏl-li
- Sŏgong-ri
- Sŏnam-ri
- Taedong-ri
- Tonggong-ri
- Tonghŭng-ri
- Usang-ri
- Wŏndong-ri
- Yŏnggu-ri
- Yŏng'ung-ri

== Economy ==
Agriculture dominates the local economy. In the mountain regions, the crops include oats, potatoes, millet, and barnyard millet. In the fertile areas in the south, rice is also grown. Lumbering and hydropower are also part of the local economy; relatively little mining takes place.

Ryu Kyong-su Tank Factory is located in the area.

== Transportation ==
Sinhŭng is served by road and rail, and lies on the Sinhŭng line of the Korean State Railway.

Sinhung has a trolleybus network of about 4.1 km long. It is a single overhead bidirectional line with a potential passing loop built between 2013 and 2017. However, two trolleybuses have not operated at least since October 2013, while the third appears to have operated until 2017 though all three trolleybuses were removed from 2017 to 2019.

== See also ==
- Geography of North Korea
- Administrative divisions of North Korea
- South Hamgyong
