= Suryeo Line =

Railway line in colonial Korea

Overview
- Native name: 수려선(水驪線)
- Status: Ceased operation
- Owner: Korean National Railroad
- Locale: Gyeonggi
- Termini: Suwon; Yeoju
- Stations: 21

Service
- Type: Passenger/freight rail
- Operator(s): Korean National Railroad

History
- Opened: 1 December 1930
- Closed: 31 March 1972

Technical
- Line length: 73.4 km (45.6 mi)
- Number of tracks: Single track
- Track gauge: 762 mm (2 ft 6 in)

- Suryeo Line
- Hangul: 수려선
- Hanja: 水驪線
- RR: Suryeoseon
- MR: Suryŏsŏn

The Suryeo Line (水驪線, Suirei-sen) is a former narrow-gauge railway line owned by Korean National Railroad. The line connected Suwon to Yeoju.

== History ==
The first section of the line was opened by the privately owned Chosen Gyeongdong Railway in 1930 and in the next year the construction was complete as follows:

Date	Section	Length
1 December 1930	Suwon–Icheon	53.1 km (33.0 mi)
1 December 1931	Icheon–Yeoju	20.3 km (12.6 mi)

The line was bought on 26 October 1942 by the Chosen Railway and after the independence of Korea, it was nationalized. After the first opening of the Yeongdong Expressway, the demand diminished abruptly and the line was finally abandoned on 31 March 1972. The Everline was finally opened on 26 April 2013 and the section Giheung – Stadium–Songdam College coincides almost with the former Suryeo line. The Gyeonggang Line, which opened on August 27, 2016, will follow the line from Icheon to Yeoju.

== Future plans ==
Neither the Ministry of Construction and Transportation nor Korail have reconstruction plans for the Suryeo Line as a whole. However, part of the line was reconstructed as a part of the Yongin Everline, and another part of the line will serve as a section of the Gyeonggang Line, allowing Yeoju to have a rail connection with Seongnam and Icheon.

== Rolling stock ==
The Suryeo line used narrow gauge steam locomotives, narrow gauge freight cars, KNR160 diesel cars, and KNR18000 passenger cars. After closure, all rolling stock was sent to the Suin Line. Examples of KNR160 and KNR18000 cars have been preserved in the Korean Railroad Museum in Uiwang.

The Gyeonggang Line, which follows part of the Suryeo Line, uses Korail Class 371000 EMUs. The Yongin Everline, which follows another part of the Suryeo Line, uses Bombardier Innovia Metro Mark II cars.

== Route ==
水驪線 - 수려선 - Suirei Line - Suryeo Line
Distance		Station name				
Total; km	S2S; km	Transcribed, Korean	Transcribed, Japanese	Hangul	Hanja/Kanji	Connections
0.0	0.0	Suwon	Suigen	수원	水原	Gyeongbu Line, Suin Line
3.0	3.0	Hwaseong	Kajō	화성	華城	
6.5	3.5	Woncheon	Ensen	원천	遠川	
9.0	2.5	Deokgok	Tokkoku	덕곡	德谷	
12.5	3.5	Singal	Shinkatsu	신갈	新葛	
15.9	3.4	Eojeong	Gyochō	어정	漁汀	
21.8	5.9	Samga	Sangai	삼가	三街	
24.1	2.3	Yongin	Ryūjin	용인	龍仁	
28.4	4.3	Mapyeong	Mahei	마평	麻坪	
31.9	3.5	Yangji	Yōchi	양지	陽智	
35.4	3.5	Jeil	Seijitsu	제일	霽日	
40.0	4.6	Ocheon	Gosen	오천	午川	
45.7	5.7	Pyogyo	Hyōkyō	표교	標橋	
49.4	3.7	Yusan	Yūzan	유산	酉山	
53.1	3.7	Icheon	Risen	이천	利川	
57.6	4.5	Muchon	Moson	무촌	茂村	
59.7	2.1	Jukdang	Chikudō	죽당	竹堂	
64.4	4.7	Maeryu	Bairyū	매류	梅柳	
67.0	2.6	Gwangdaeri	Kōtairi	광대리	広大里	
69.7	2.7	Yeollari	Enrari	연라리	煙羅里	
73.4	3.7	Yeoju	Reishū	여주	驪州	

== See also ==
- Korail
- Chosen Railway
- Transportation in South Korea
