= Pujon County =

Coordinates: 40°29′N 127°37′E

Pujon County 부전군
- County

Korean transcription(s)
  - Hanja: 赴戰郡
  - McCune-Reischauer: Pujŏn-kun
  - Revised Romanization: Bujeon-gun
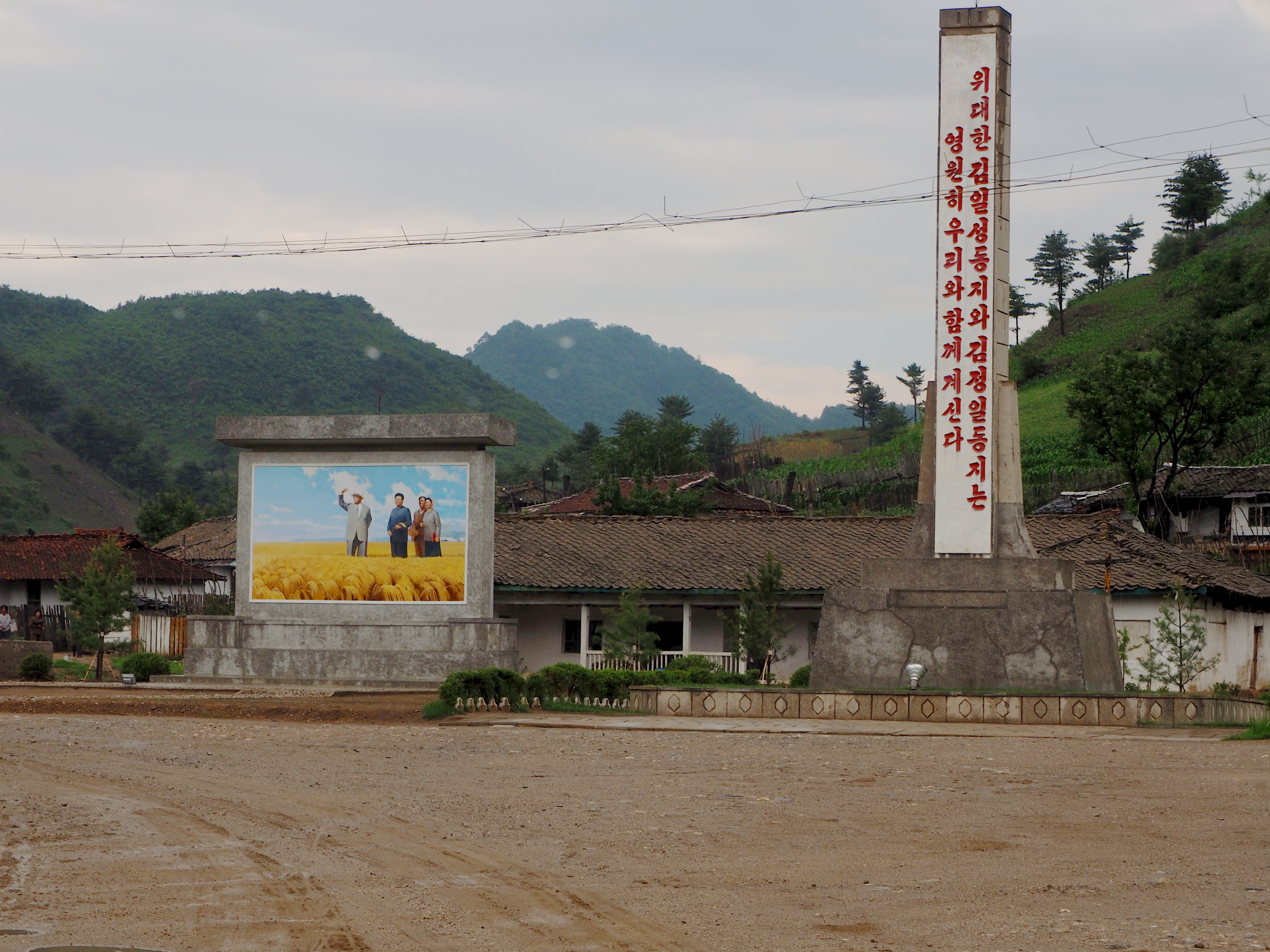
- In Pujŏn county

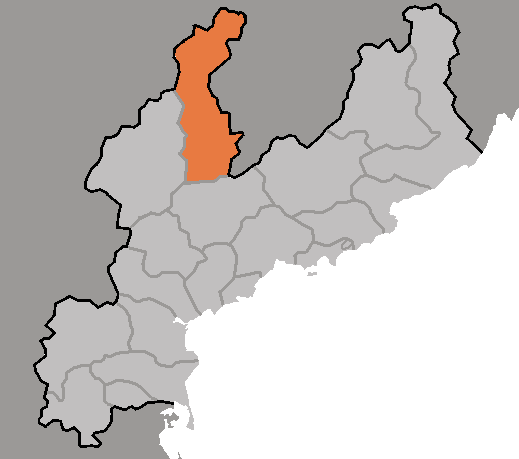
- Map of South Hamgyong showing the location of Pujon
- Country: North Korea
- Province: South Hamgyong Province

Area
  - Total: 1,775 km^{2} (685 sq mi)

Population (2008)
  - Total: 48,351
  - Density: 27.24/km^{2} (70.55/sq mi)

Pujŏn (Pujŏn-kun) is a county in northern South Hamgyŏng province, North Korea.

In historical contexts, Pujŏn is sometimes known as Fusen, according to its Japanese pronunciation.

The Korean People's Revolutionary Army built a secret camp on Mount Okryon in Pujŏn in the 1930s. This area was home to revolutionary activities of Kim Jong-suk during the anti-Japanese struggle. Commemorating her activities the Pujŏn Revolutionary Battle Site has been designated.

== Administrative divisions ==
Pujŏn county is divided into 1 ŭp (town), 2 rodongjagu (workers' districts) and 14 ri (villages):

- Pujŏn-ŭp
- Ch'ail-lodongjagu
- Hobal-lodongjagu
- An'gi-ri
- Handae-ri
- Ip'al-li
- Kaehwa-ri
- Kwangdae-ri
- Mun'am-ri
- Munch'ŏl-li
- Paeg'am-ri
- Rŭnggu-ri
- Sansu-ri
- Sŏnŭp-ri
- Tongnŭp-ri
- Ŭnha-ri
- Yŏul-li

== Transportation ==
Pujŏn county is served by the Sinhŭng line of the Korean State Railway.

== Sport ==
It has one of the three speed skating ovals in the country.
