= Chōsen Railway =

1923–1946 railway company in Korea

Chosen Railway Co. Ltd.
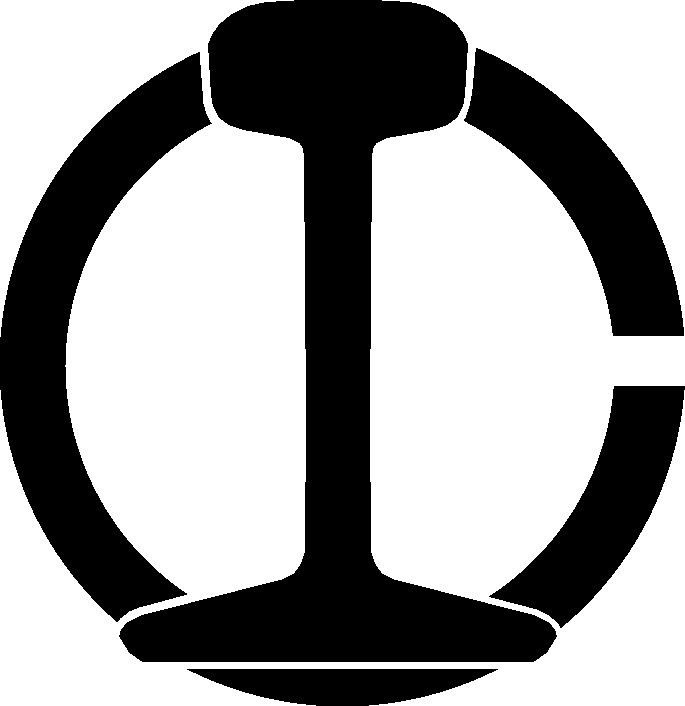

Overview
- Native name: 조선철도주식회사 (Joseon Cheoldo Jusikhoesa) 朝鮮鐵道株式會社 (Chōsen Tetsudō Kabushiki Kaisha)

The Chōsen Railway Company (Japanese: 朝鮮鉄道株式会社, Chōsen Tetsudō Kabushiki-gaisha; Korean: 조선철도주식회사, Joseon Cheoldo Jusikhoesa), was a privately owned railway company in Japanese-occupied Korea.

== History ==
The Chōsen Railway was established on 1 September 1923 through the merger of six companies:

- Chosen Central Railway (朝鮮中央鉄道 Chōsen Chūō Tetsudō; 조선중앙철도 Joseon Jung-ang Cheoldo),
- Chosen Forestry Railway (朝鮮森林鉄道 Chōsen Shinrin Tetsudō; 조선삼림철도 Joseon Samrim Cheoldo),
- Chosen Industrial Railway (朝鮮産業鉄道 Chōsen Sangyō Tetsudō; 조선산업철도 Joseon San-eop Cheoldo),
- Chosen Southern Railway (南朝鮮鉄道, Minamichōsen Tetsudō; 남조선철도 Namjoseon Cheoldo),
- West Chosen Development Railway (西鮮殖産鉄道, Seisen Shokusan Tetsudō; 서선식산철도 Seoseon Sigsan Cheoldo)
- Yanggang Forest Development Railway (両江拓林鉄道, Ryōkō Takurin Tetsudō; 량강척림철도, Yanggang Cheongrim Cheoldo)

It was the largest privately owned company on the Korean Peninsula at the time, with a capital of 54.5 million yen. To distinguish it from the Chosen Government Railway, which was abbreviated 鮮鉄 (Sentetsu; 선철, Seoncheol), the Chosen Railway was abbreviated 朝鉄 (Chōtetsu; 조철, Jocheol).

In addition to extensively investing in busses and in the development of Hwanghae Province, in 1927, Chōtetsu established a subsidiary company, the North Chōsen Colonial Railway, to build and operate a line in the northeastern part of Korea.

== Routes ==
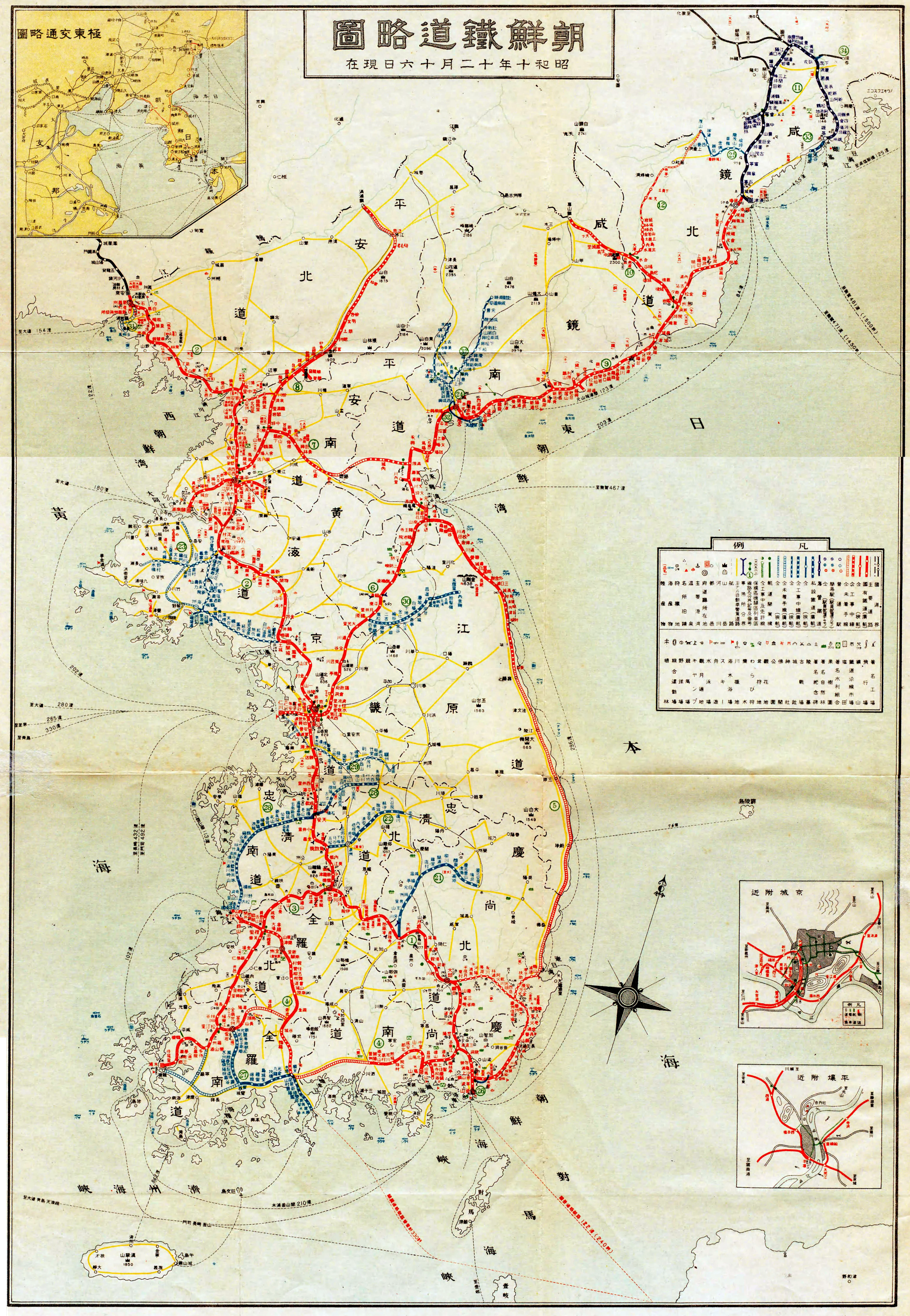
Map of Chōsen Railway (1936). Red indicates state-owned lines; blue indicates private railways.

In terms of rail network and regional extent, it was the largest private railway in Korea at the time. The Gyeongdong and Gyeongbuk Lines were eventually nationalised by the Chosen Government Railway, while other lines were sold to other private railways.

The Chosen Railway absorbed the Sinheung Railway, a subsidiary established on 1 February 1930, on 22 April 1938, thus acquiring the narrow-gauge Hamnam Line, Songheung Line, Namheung Line and Jangjin Line.

The narrow-gauge Suryeo Line and Suin Line, originally opened by the Chosen Gyeongdong Railway, was bought by the Chosen Railway on 16 October 1942.

At the end of the Second World War, all lines still owned by the Chosen Railway were nationalised; the lines in South Korea became part of the Korean National Railroad on 17 May 1946, and those in North Korea became part of the Korean State Railway.

=== Standard gauge ===
- Chungbuk Line (Jochiwon–Chungju) – to Korail Chungbuk Line
- Gwangnyeo Line (Gwangju–Yeosu) - to Sentetsu Songnyeo Line in 1936
- Gyeongbuk Line (Gimcheon–Andong) – to Korail Gyeongbuk Line
- Gyeongnam Line (Masan–Jinju) – to Sentetsu as part of Gyeongjeong Nambu Line in 1931
- Jeonnam Line (Songjeongri–Damyang) – to Sentetsu Gwangju Line (Songjeongri–Gwangju) in 1928
- Yeongchun Line (Yeongju–Naeseong) – to Korail as part of Yeongdong Line

=== Narrow gauge ===
- Jangjin Line (Sangtong–Sasu–Gujin) – to Korean State Railway Changjin Line
- Gyeongdong Line (Daegu–Ulsan, Pohang–Haksan) – nationalised in 1928, becoming Sentetsu Donghae Jungbu Line
- Hamnam Line (Hamhŭng–Hamnam Sinhŭng, Oro–Sangt'ong, P'ungsang–Changp'ung) – to Korean State Railway Sinhŭng Line and Changjin Line
- Hwanghae Line (Sariwon–Samgang–Jangyeon; Samgang–Dongpo–Hwasan–Sinwon–Haeju Port; Hwasan–Naeto; Sinwon–Haseong; Sinwon–Guhaseong; Toseong (Gaepung)–Haeju; Haeju–Dongpo–Ongjin; Dongpo–Jeongdo) – "Hwanghae Line" was the name of several narrow gauge railway lines of the Chosen Railway. These were nationalised on 1 April 1944 and absorbed by the Chosen Government Railway, which split the Hwanghae Line into several separate lines: the Jangyeon Line (not identical to today's Changyŏn Line of the Korean State Railway), the Sahae Line, the Naeto Line, the Haseong Line, Tohae Line, Ongjin Line, and the Jeongdo Line. Following the partition of Korea all these lines ended up with the Korean State Railway, which subsequently closed some of the lines and re-divided others, splitting them between the Changyŏn Line, the Ongjin Line, the Paech'ŏn Line, the Ŭnnyul Line and the Hwanghae Ch'ŏngnyŏn Line
- Namheung Line (Hamheung–Seoho) – to Korean State Railway Sŏho Line
- Songheung Line (Hamnam Sinheung–Bujeonhoban) – to Korean State Railway Sinhŭng Line
- Suin Line (Suwon-Incheon) - to Korail Suin Line
- Suryeo Line (Suwon–Yeoju) – to Korail Suryeo Line

== Services ==
Passenger services on Chōtetsu's network were extensive, with the following services listed in the last timetable issued prior to the start of the Pacific War:

- Chungbuk Line - six trains daily between Jochiwon and Chungju;
- Hamnam Line - four trains daily between Hamheung and Oro;
- Hamnam Line + Jangjin Line - three trains daily between Hamheung and Sasu, and one train daily between Hamheung and Samgeo;
- Hamnam Line + Songheung Line - one train daily between Hamheung and Pujeonhoban, one train daily between Hamheung and Pujeonhoban via Jangpung, one train daily between Hamheung and Hamnam Songheung, and one train daily between Oro and Hamnam Songheung;
- Hwanghae Line - five trains daily between Toseong and Haeju, four trains daily between Sariwon and Haeju, three trains daily between Sariwon and Jangyeon, five trains daily between East Haeju and Ongjin, three trains daily between Hwasan and Naeto, and nine trains daily between Sindeok and Haseong;
- Jangjin Line - one train daily between Oro and Samgeo, and one train daily between Goto and Sasu;
- Namheung Line - two trains daily between Yongseong and Seohojin, one train daily between West Hamheung and Yongseong, and five trains daily between West Hamheung and Seohojin;
- Suin Line - four trains daily between Suwon and Incheon;
- Suryeo Line - three trains daily between Suwon and Yeoju.

== Motive Power ==
The Chōsen Railway used a wide variety of locomotives, mostly steam, and most built by Kisha Seizō of Japan. Chōtetsu was also one of the first railways to use diesel locomotives in Korea.

Steam locomotives
Class	Numbers	Wheel arr.	Builder	Year	Works numbers	Total in class	Image	Function	Notes
630	630-634	2-6-2T	Kisha Seizō	1930	1113-1117	5		General	Hwanghae Line
655	655-657	2-6-2T	Kisha Seizō	1935	1302-1304	3		General	
660	660–662; 663-?	2-6-2	Kisha Seizō; Nippon Sharyō	1937	1490–1492 ?	?		Express passenger	Hwanghae Line, Suin Line, Suryeo Line
700	700-703	0-8-0	Hitachi	1927	?	4		General, shunting	
810	810–813; 814-817	2-8-0	Kisha Seizō	1935; 1936	1340–1343; 1413-1417	8		Freight	Hambuk Line, Hwanghae Line, Suin Line, Suryeo Line
900	900–906; 907-909; 910-911; 912-914	2-8-2	Kisha Seizō; Nippon Sharyō; Kisha Seizō; Hitachi	1937; 1937; 1944; 1944	1441–1447 ? 2353-2354 ?	15		Freight	World's largest 762mm gauge 2-8-2 locomotive
Diesel locomotives
D	D1	B	Kisha Seizō	1932	2709	1		Freight, shunting	Originally used for iron ore trains on the Hwanghae Line.

== Bibliography ==
- 朝鮮総督府官報 (The Public Journal of the Governor-General of Korea), Shōwa No. 669, 28 March 1929
- Kokubu, Hayato (January 2007). 将軍様の鉄道. Shōgun-sama no Tetsudō. p. 85. ISBN 978-4-10-303731-6.
