= Class 230 =

Class 230 may refer to:

- British Rail Class 230, multiple-unit
- DB Class 230 (after German reunification), diesel-electric locomotives originally of the Soviet-built DR Class 130 family
- JNR Class 230, steam locomotives in Japan, early 20th century
- Vietnam Railways 230 Class, steam locomotives
