= Kisha Seizo =

Japanese manufacturer of railway rolling stock (1896–1972)

- Type: Subsidiary
- Industry: Rail transport
- Founded: 1869; 157 years ago
- Defunct: 1972
- Fate: Merged
- Successor: Kawasaki Heavy Industries
- Headquarters: Osaka, Japan
- Area served: Worldwide
- Products: Locomotives; High-speed trains Intercity and commuter trains Trams; People movers Signalling systems

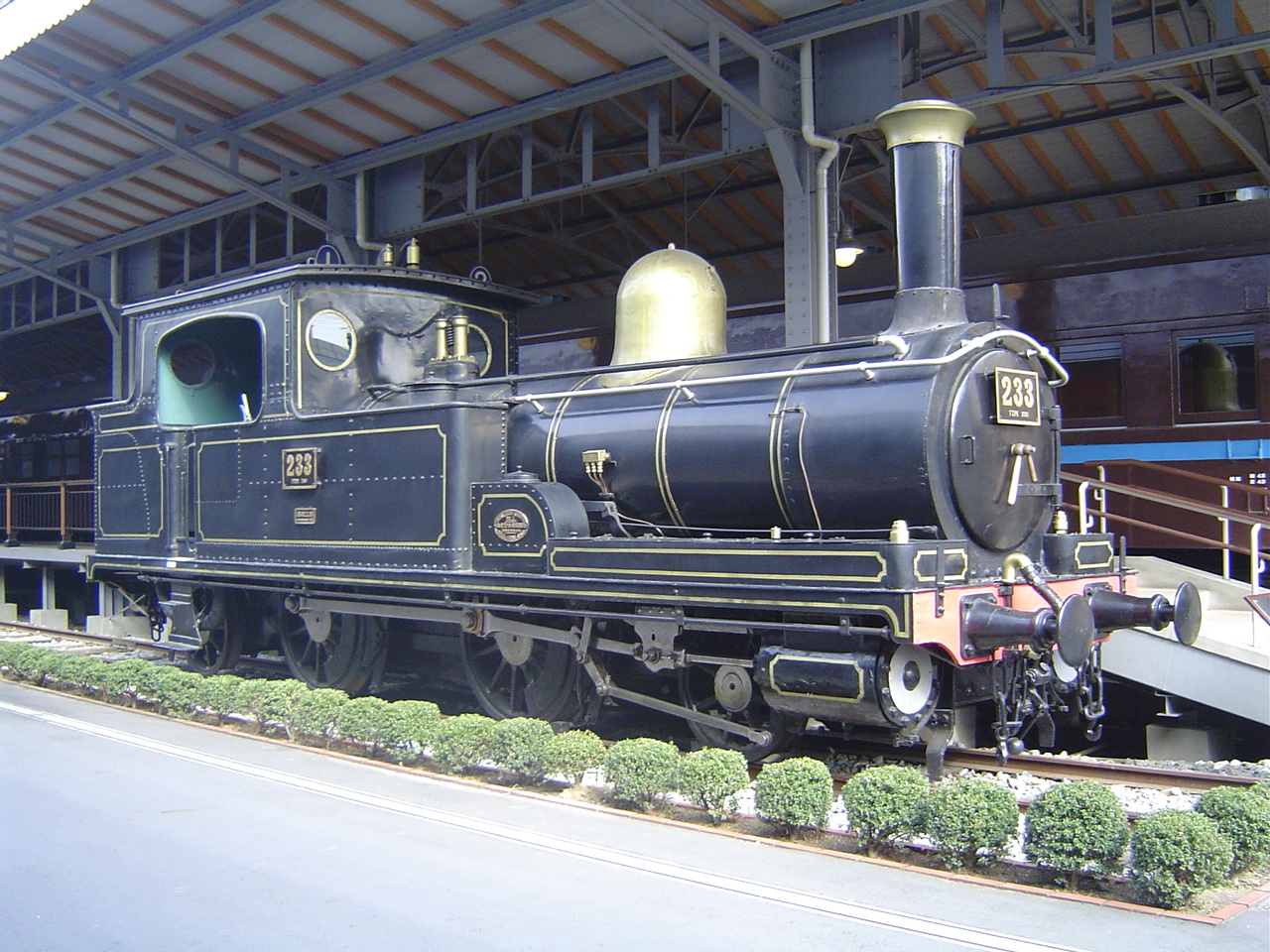
Works number 11 (JNR locomotive No. 233)

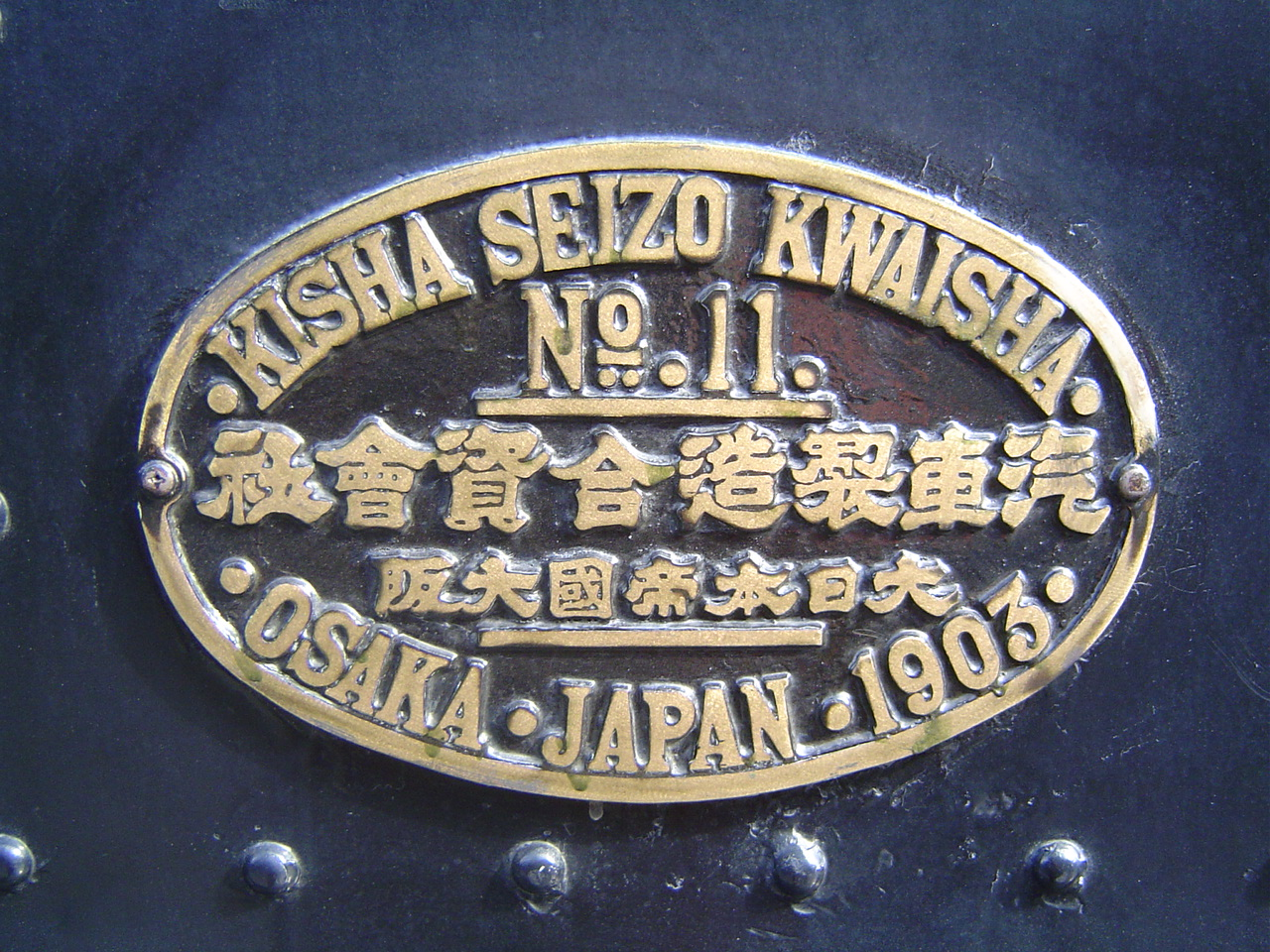
Builder's plate of No. 233

Kisha Seizo Co., Ltd. (汽車製造株式会社, Kisha Seizō Kabushiki Gaisha) was a Japanese manufacturer of railway rolling stock that existed from 1896 to 1972.

- 1896: Established by Masaru Inoue as the Kisha Seizo Joint Stock Company (汽車製造合資会社, Kisha Seizō Gōshi Kaisha).
- 1899: Factory opened in Osaka.
- 1901: Merged with the Hiraoka Factory (平岡工場, Hiraoka Kōjō), a coach and car maker in Tokyo. The two plants were reorganized as the Osaka Head Office and the Tokyo Branch.
- 1912: Becomes Kisha Seizo Co., Ltd. (汽車製造株式会社) after corporate restructuring.
- 1936: Head office moved to Tokyo; Osaka Head Office becomes Osaka Branch.
- 1944: The two branches (factories) renamed Osaka Works and Tokyo Works respectively.
- 1968: Construction of railway wagon factory in Utsunomiya.
- 1972: Merged with Kawasaki Heavy Industries.

== Preserved Kisha Seizō Locomotives ==
| Works number | Year | Original operator | Class | Road number | Identity as preserved | Location | Country | Notes |
|---|---|---|---|---|---|---|---|---|
| 11 | 1903 | Imperial Japanese Railways | A10形 | 894 | Japanese Government Railways 230形 233 | Kyoto Railway Museum | Japan | Carries number plates of w/n 15 (IJR A10形 895) |
| 19 | 1904 | Taiwan Government-General Railway | 18型 | 32 | Taiwan Railways BK10型 BK24 | Tainan, Taiwan | Taiwan | |
| 26 | 1905 | Hokuetsu Railway | G形 | ? | Japanese National Railways 230形 268 | Tosu, Saga | Japan | |
| 92 | 1912 | Taiwan Government-General Railway | 50型 | 57 | Taiwan Railways CK50型 CK58 | Kaohsiung, Taiwan | Taiwan | |
| 109 | 1913 | Japanese Government Railways | 8700形 | 8722 | Yūbetsu Railway | Kushiro, Hokkaido | Japan | |
| 119 | 1914 | Japanese Government Railways | 8620形 | 8620 | Japanese National Railways 8620形 8620 | Ōme, Tokyo | Japan | |
| 121 | 1914 | Japanese Government Railways | 8620形 | 8622 | Japanese National Railways 8620形 8622 | Shikaoi, Hokkaido | Japan | |
| 129 | 1914 | Japanese Government Railways | 8620形 | 8630 | Japanese National Railways 8620形 8630 | Kyoto Railway Museum | Japan | |
| 240 | 1917 | Taiwan Government-General Railway | 100型 | 101 | Taiwan Railways CK100型 CK101 | Changhua Roundhouse, Taiwan | Taiwan | |
| 291 | 1918 | Taiwan Government-General Railway | 20型 | 22 | Taiwan Railways LDK50型 LDK56 | Koshigaya, Saitama | Japan | 762mm narrow gauge |
| 315 | 1918 | Japanese Government Railways | 9600形 | 29611 | Japanese National Railways 9600形 29611 | Ōmachi, Saga | Japan | |
| 316 | 1918 | Japanese Government Railways | 9600形 | 29612 | Japanese National Railways 9600形 29612 | Kusu, Ōita | Japan | |
| 358 | 1919 | Taiwan Government-General Railway | 500型 | 501 | Taiwan Railways CT150型 CT152 | Miaoli, Taiwan | Taiwan | |
| 381 | 1919 | Japanese Government Railways | 8620形 | 28651 | Japanese National Railways 8620形 28651 | Ōno, Fukui | Japan | |
| 501 | 1921 | Japanese Government Railways | 18900形 | 18943 | Japanese National Railways C51形 C51 44 | JR East Akita Vehicle Centre, Akita, Akita | Japan | preserved as cutaway |
| 519 | 1921 | Japanese Government Railways | 8620形 | 48640 | Japanese National Railways 8620形 48640 | Hirosaki, Aomori | Japan | |
| 526 | 1921 | Japanese Government Railways | 8620形 | 48647 | Japanese National Railways 8620形 48647 | Takachiho, Miyazaki | Japan | |
| 529 | 1921 | Japanese Government Railways | 8620形 | 48650 | Japanese National Railways 8620形 48650 | Miyoshi, Hiroshima | Japan | |
| 544 | 1921 | Taiwan Government-General Railway | 20型 | 23 | Taiwan Railways LDK50型 LDK57 | Nasu, Tochigi | Japan | 762mm narrow gauge |
| 630 | 1922 | Japanese Government Railways | 8620形 | 58680 | Japanese National Railways 8620形 58680 | Mobara, Chiba | Japan | |
| 633 | 1922 | Japanese Government Railways | 8620形 | 58683 | Japanese National Railways 8620形 58683 | Takasaki River South Park, Sakura, Chiba | Japan | |
| 635 | 1922 | Japanese Government Railways | 8620形 | 58685 | Japanese National Railways 8620形 58685 | Tadotsu, Kagawa | Japan | |
| 661 | 1923 | Japanese Government Railways | 18900形 | 18980 | Japanese National Railways C51形 C51 85 | JR Kyushu Kagoshima Vehicle Centre, Kagoshima, Kagoshima | Japan | preserved as cutaway |
| 792 | 1924 | Japanese Government Railways | 9600形 | 79642 | Japanese National Railways 9600形 79642 | Yawatahama, Ehime | Japan | |
| 861 | 1926 | Japanese Government Railways | 8620形 | 88622 | Japanese National Railways 8620形 88622 | Iki, Nagasaki | Japan | |
| 884 | 1926 | Jinchū Railway | 3形 | 3 | Jinchū Ry 3形 3 | Sotetsu Kashiwadai Vehicle Centre, Ebina, Kanagawa | Japan | |
| 936 | 1927 | Japanese Government Railways | 18900形 | 38938 | Japanese National Railways C51形 C51 239 | Kyoto Railway Museum | Japan | |
| 1027 | 1928 | Japanese Government Railways | D50形 | D50 282 | Japanese National Railways D60形 D60 61 | Ashiya, Fukuoka | Japan | |
| 1040 | 1928 | Japanese Government Railways | C53形 | C53 45 | Japanese National Railways C53形 C53 45 | Kyoto Railway Museum | Japan | |
| 1101 | 1929 | Taiwan Government-General Railway | 800型 | 828 | Taiwan Railways DT580型 DT609 | Kaohsiung, Taiwan | Taiwan | |
| 1120 | 1930 | Japanese Government Railways | C50形 | C50 103 | Japanese National Railways C50形 C50 103 | Minamisōma, Fukushima | Japan | |
| 1174 | 1932 | Japanese Government Railways | C11形 | C11 1 | Japanese National Railways C11形 C11 1 | Ōme, Tokyo | Japan | |
| 1183 | 1932 | Japanese Government Railways | C11形 | C11 2 | Japanese National Railways C11形 C11 2 | Mikasa, Hokkaido | Japan | |
| 1186 | 1932 | Japanese Government Railways | C12形 | C12 5 | Japanese National Railways C11形 C12 5 | Nirasaki, Yamanashi | Japan | |
| 1187 | 1932 | Japanese Government Railways | C12形 | C12 6 | Japanese National Railways C11形 C12 6 | Otaru, Hokkaido | Japan | |
| 1219 | 1934 | Japanese Government Railways | C12形 | C12 60 | Japanese National Railways C11形 C12 60 | Fukushima, Fukushima | Japan | |
| 1223 | 1934 | Japanese Government Railways | C12形 | C12 64 | Japanese National Railways C11形 C12 64 | Miyakonojō, Miyazaki | Japan | |
| 1249 | 1934 | Japanese Government Railways | C12形 | C12 85 | Japanese National Railways C11形 C12 85 | Wakō, Saitama | Japan | |
| 1252 | 1934 | Japanese Government Railways | C12形 | C12 88 | Japanese National Railways C11形 C12 88 | Itoigawa, Niigata | Japan | |
| 1289 | 1935 | Japanese Government Railways | C11形 | C11 66 | Japanese National Railways C11形 C11 66 | Naruto, Tokushima | Japan | |
| 1313 | 1935 | China Railway | ミカサ形 | ミカサ1422 | China Railway JF6 3022 | China Railway Museum, Beijing, China | China | |
| 1352 | 1935 | Japanese Government Railways | C56形 | C56 23 | State Railway of Thailand 700 Series 719 | Kanchanaburi, Thailand | Thailand | |
| 1365 | 1935 | Japanese Government Railways | C56形 | C56 35 | State Railway of Thailand 700 Series 728 | Nakhon Lampang, Thailand | Thailand | |
| 1371 | 1936 | Japanese Government Railways | D51形 | D51 14 | Japanese National Railways D51形 D51 14 | Nagareyama, Chiba | Japan | |
| 1375 | 1936 | Japanese Government Railways | D51形 | D51 18 | Japanese National Railways D51形 D51 18 | Ube, Yamaguchi | Japan | |
| 1382 | 1936 | Chosen Government Railway | ミカサ形 | ミカサ36 | Korean State Railway 6300型 6336 | Hamhung | North Korea | Operational for railfan tours |
| 1388 | 1936 | State Railway of Thailand | DX50形 | 351 | State Railway of Thailand 350 Series 351 | Thanyaburi District, Pathum Thani Province, Thailand | Thailand | Asia Fertilizer and Rice Mill Industry Co., Ltd. Use a rice mill business |
| 1390 | 1936 | State Railway of Thailand | DX50形 | 353 | State Railway of Thailand 350 Series 353 | Thanyaburi District, Pathum Thani Province, Thailand | Thailand | Asia Fertilizer and Rice Mill Industry Co., Ltd. Use a rice mill business |
| 1412 | 1936 | Chosen Railway | 810形 | 812 | Korean State Railway 500型 502 | Ch'ŏlgwang, North Korea | North Korea | Operational for railfan tours |
| 1415 | 1936 | Chosen Railway | 810形 | 815 | Korean State Railway 500型 505 | Ch'ŏlgwang, North Korea | North Korea | Operational for railfan tours |
| 1417 | 1936 | Chosen Railway | 810形 | 817 | Korean State Railway 500型 507 | Ch'ŏlgwang, North Korea | North Korea | Operational for railfan tours |
| 1458 | 1937 | Japanese Government Railways | C55形 | C55 50 | Japanese National Railways C55形 C55 50 | Otaru, Hokkaido | Japan | |
| 1460 | 1937 | Japanese Government Railways | C55形 | C55 52 | Japanese National Railways C55形 C55 52 | Yoshimatsu Station, Yūsui, Kagoshima | Japan | |
| 1503 | 1937 | Japanese Government Railways | C57形 | C57 11 | Japanese National Railways C57形 C57 11 | Toyooka, Hyōgo | Japan | |
| 1512 | 1937 | Taiwan Government-General Railway | C57形 | C57 20 | Taiwan Railways CT270型 CT271 | Taipei, Taiwan | Taiwan | |
| 1552 | 1938 | Japanese Government Railways | C11形 | C11 133 | Japanese National Railways C11形 C11 133 | Tomakomai, Hokkaido | Japan | |
| 1564 | 1938 | Japanese Government Railways | D51形 | D51 95 | Japanese National Railways D51形 D51 95 | Shintoku, Hokkaido | Japan | |
| 1565 | 1938 | Japanese Government Railways | D51形 | D51 96 | Japanese National Railways D51形 D51 96 | Annaka, Gunma | Japan | |
| 1570 | 1938 | Japanese Government Railways | D51形 | D51 101 | Japanese National Railways D51形 D51 101 | Shimada, Shizuoka | Japan | |
| 1572 | 1938 | Japanese Government Railways | D51形 | D51 103 | Japanese National Railways D51形 D51 103 | Iwakuni, Yamaguchi | Japan | |
| 1578 | 1938 | Japanese Government Railways | C58形 | C58 1 | Japanese National Railways C58形 C58 1 | Kyoto Railway Museum | Japan | |
| 1582 | 1938 | Japanese Government Railways | C58形 | C58 5 | Japanese National Railways C58形 C58 5 | Utsunomiya, Tochigi | Japan | |
| 1627 | 1938 | Japanese Government Railways | C58形 | C58 82 | Japanese National Railways C58形 C58 82 | Bihoro, Hokkaido | Japan | |
| 1648 | 1938 | Japanese Government Railways | C58形 | C58 98 | Japanese National Railways C58形 C58 98 | Fukagawa, Hokkaido | Japan | |
| 1653 | 1938 | Japanese Government Railways | C58形 | C58 103 | Japanese National Railways C58形 C58 103 | Ichinoseki, Iwate | Japan | |
| 1664 | 1939 | Japanese Government Railways | C58形 | C58 106 | Japanese National Railways C58形 C58 106 | Kushiro, Hokkaido | Japan | |
| 1670 | 1939 | Japanese Government Railways | C58形 | C58 112 | Japanese National Railways C58形 C58 112 | Shibushi, Kagoshima | Japan | |
| 1671 | 1939 | Japanese Government Railways | C58形 | C58 113 | Japanese National Railways C58形 C58 113 | Maizuru, Kyoto | Japan | |
| 1694 | 1939 | Japanese Government Railways | C58形 | C58 114 | Japanese National Railways C58形 C58 114 | Ōsaki, Miyagi | Japan | |
| 1699 | 1939 | Japanese Government Railways | C58形 | C58 119 | Japanese National Railways C58形 C58 119 | Kitami, Hokkaido | Japan | |
| 1754 | 1939 | Japanese Government Railways | C58形 | C58 139 | Japanese National Railways C58形 C58 139 | Yūbetsu, Hokkaido | Japan | |
| 1804 | 1939 | Japanese Government Railways | C58形 | C58 170 | Japanese National Railways C58形 C58 170 | Toyooka, Hyōgo | Japan | |
| 1805 | 1939 | Japanese Government Railways | C58形 | C58 171 | Japanese National Railways C58形 C58 171 | Obama, Fukui | Japan | |
| 1852 | 1940 | China Railway | パシサ形 | パシサ1542 | China Railway SL3 152 | China Railway Museum, Beijing, China | China | |
| 1863 | 1940 | Japanese Government Railways | D51形 | D51 444 | Japanese National Railways D51形 D51 444 | Kitami, Hokkaido | Japan | |
| 1870 | 1940 | Japanese Government Railways | D51形 | D51 451 | Japanese National Railways D51形 D51 451 | Akishima, Tokyo | Japan | |
| 1871 | 1940 | Japanese Government Railways | D51形 | D51 452 | Japanese National Railways D51形 D51 452 | Ōme, Tokyo | Japan | |
| 1872 | 1940 | Japanese Government Railways | D51形 | D51 453 | Japanese National Railways D51形 D51 453 | Kashiwa, Chiba | Japan | |
| 1889 | 1940 | Taiwan Government-General Railway | D51型 | D51 2 | Taiwan Railways DT650型 DT652 | Tainan, Taiwan | Taiwan | |
| 1920 | 1940 | Japanese Government Railways | C11形 | C11 155 | Japanese National Railways C11形 C11 155 | Ōgaki, Gifu | Japan | |
| 1932 | 1940 | Japanese Government Railways | C11形 | C11 167 | Japanese National Railways C11形 C11 167 | Aomori, Aomori | Japan | |
| 1945 | 1940 | Chosen Government Railway | ミカサ形 | ミカサ129 | Korean National Railroad 미카3型 미카3-129 | Daejeon National Cemetery, Daejeon, South Korea | South Korea | |
| 2000 | 1941 | Japanese Government Railways | C59形 | C59 1 | Japanese National Railways C59形 C59 1 | Kyushu Railway Museum, Kitakyushu, Fukuoka | Japan | |
| 2060 | 1941 | Japanese Government Railways | C58形 | C58 275 | Japanese National Railways C58形 C58 275 | Kasama, Ibaraki | Japan | |
| 2062 | 1941 | Japanese Government Railways | C58形 | C58 277 | Japanese National Railways C58形 C58 277 | Kobayashi, Miyazaki | Japan | |
| 2065 | 1941 | Japanese Government Railways | C58形 | C58 280 | Japanese National Railways C58形 C58 280 | Minokamo, Gifu | Japan | |
| 2174 | 1942 | Japanese Government Railways | C58形 | C58 322 | Japanese National Railways C58形 C58 322 | Mishima, Shizuoka | Japan | |
| 2177 | 1942 | Japanese Government Railways | C58形 | C58 325 | Japanese National Railways C58形 C58 325 | JR West Kanazawa General Depot, Kanazawa, Ishikawa | Japan | |
| 2219 | 1942 | China Railway | ミカサ形 | ミカサ13 | China Railway JF9 3673 | China Railway Museum, Beijing, China | China | |
| 2200 | 1942 | Chosen Government Railway | マテイ | ミカサ10 | Korean National Railroad 마더1型 마더1-10 | Imjingak, Paju, South Korea | South Korea | |
| 2232 | 1942 | Taiwan Government-General Railway | D51型 | D51 20 | Taiwan Railways DT650型 DT670 | Taipei, Taiwan | Taiwan | |
| 2234 | 1942 | Iburi Jūkan Railway | D51形 | D5104 | Japanese National Railways D51形 D51 953 | Toyoura, Hokkaido | Japan | |
| 2257 | 1942 | Japanese Government Railways | D51形 | D51 774 | Japanese National Railways D51形 D51 774 | Izumo, Shimane | Japan | |
| 2258 | 1942 | Japanese Government Railways | D51形 | D51 775 | Japanese National Railways D51形 D51 775 | Kiso, Nagano | Japan | |
| 2260 | 1942 | Japanese Government Railways | D51形 | D51 777 | Japanese National Railways D51形 D51 777 | Kariya, Aichi | Japan | |
| 2327 | 1943 | Japanese Government Railways | D51形 | D51 787 | Japanese National Railways D51形 D51 787 | Miyota, Nagano | Japan | |
| 2334 | 1943 | Japanese Government Railways | C58形 | C58 342 | Japanese National Railways C58形 C58 342 | Kitakami, Iwate | Japan | |
| 2436 | 1944 | Japanese Government Railways | D52形 | D52 136 | Japanese National Railways D52形 D52 136 | Numazu, Shizuoka | Japan | |
| 2438 | 1944 | Japanese Government Railways | D52形 | D52 138 | Japanese National Railways D52形 D52 138 | Sagamihara, Kanagawa | Japan | Preserved as D52 235 |
| 2446 | 1946 | Japanese National Railways | E10形 | E10 2 | Japanese National Railways E10形 E10 2 | Ōme, Tokyo | Japan | |
| 2525 | 1946 | Japanese Government Railways | C58形 | C58 389 | Japanese National Railways C58形 C58 389 | Hamamatsu, Shizuoka | Japan | |
| 2526 | 1946 | Japanese Government Railways | C58形 | C58 390 | Japanese National Railways C58形 C58 390 | Yosano, Kyoto | Japan | |
| 2531 | 1946 | Japanese Government Railways | C58形 | C58 395 | Japanese National Railways C58形 C58 395 | Hamura, Tokyo | Japan | |
| 2543 | 1946 | Japanese Government Railways | C58形 | C58 407 | Japanese National Railways C58形 C58 407 | Toshima, Tokyo | Japan | |
| 2550 | 1947 | Japanese Government Railways | C58形 | C58 414 | Japanese National Railways C58形 C58 414 | Tamaki, Mie | Japan | |
| 2577 | 1949 | Soviet Railways | D51 | D51-22 | Soviet Railways D51-22 | Yuzhno-Sakhalinsk, Russia | Russia | |
| 2578 | 1949 | Soviet Railways | D51 | D51-23 | Soviet Railways D51-23 | Biratori, Hokkaido | Japan | |
| 2598 | 1949 | State Railway of Thailand | DX50形 | 955 | State Railway of Thailand 900 Series 955 | Ratchathewi District, Bangkok, Thailand | Thailand | Makkasan Factory State Railway of Thailand |
| 2622 | 1925 | Shin-Keihan Electric Railway | BL-2形 | BL-2 3 | Keihan Electric Railway デキ2000形 2003 | Takarazuka Train Hall, Takarazuka, Hyōgo | Japan | Only partially preserved |
| 2626 | 1927 | Japanese Government Railways | EB10形 | EB10 1 | Japanese National Railways EB10形 EB10 1 | Fuchū, Tokyo | Japan | |
| 2643 | 1932 | Japanese Government Railways | EF53形 | EF53 2 | Japanese National Railways EF53形 EF53 2 | Usui Pass Railway Heritage Park, Annaka, Gunma | Japan | |
| 2683 | 1943 | Chosen Government Railway | デロイ形 | デロイ3 | Korean State Railway 전기하3 | Kowŏn, North Korea | North Korea | Operational as historical locomotive |
| 2722 | 1953 | Okayama Rinkō Railway | 100形 | 102 | Okayama Rinkō Railway 100形 102 | Okayama Rinkō Railway head office, Okayama, Okayama | Japan | |
| 2751 | 1956 | Nanbu Railway | DC35形 | DC351 | Kaya Railway DC35形 DC351 | Kaya SL Square, Yosano, Kyoto | Japan | |
| 2861 | 1961 | Japanese National Railways | DD14形 | DD14 1 | Japanese National Railways DD14形 DD14 1 | Mikasa Railway Memorial Hall, Mikasa, Hokkaido | Japan | |
| 3061 | 1965 | Keretapi Tanah Melayu | Class 21 | 21111 | ex-KTM Class 21, 21111 | Malacca, Malaysia | Malaysia | |
| 3601 | 1968 | Japanese National Railways | EF66形 | EF66 1 | Japanese National Railways EF66形 EF66 1 | Hiroshima Engine Depot, Hiroshima, Hiroshima | Japan | |
