= JNR Class DD14 =

Japanese diesel snowplough locomotive

Class DD14
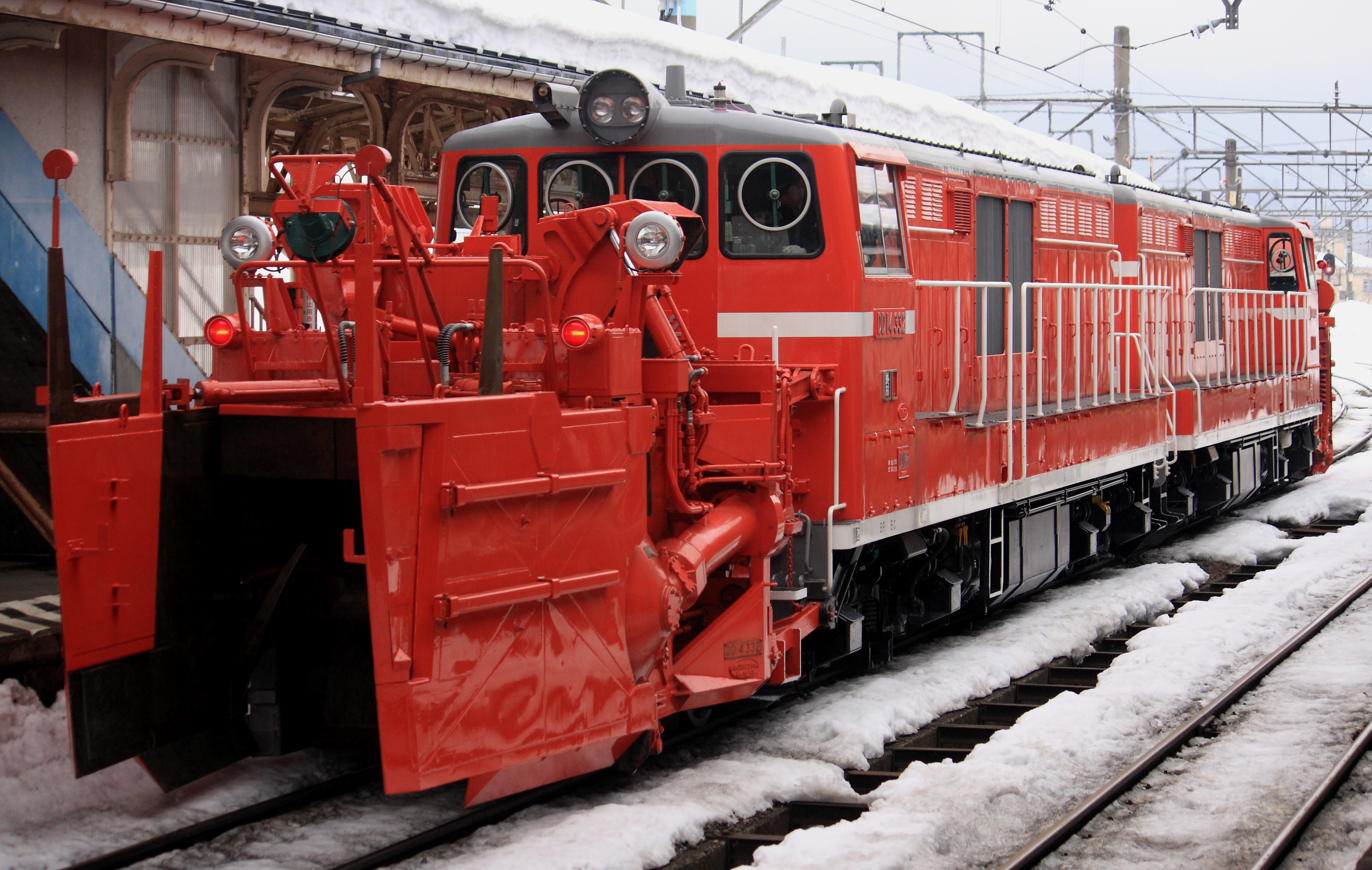
- JR East DD14 327 and 332 in action in February 2012
Type and origin
- Power type: Diesel-hydraulic
- Builder: Kisha Seizō, Kawasaki
- Build date: 1961-1979
- Total produced: 43
Specifications
- Configuration
  - AAR: B-B
  - UIC: B'B'
- Gauge: 1,067 mm (3 ft 6 in)
- Train heating: None
- Safety systems: ATS-SN
Performance figures
- Maximum speed: 70 km/h (45 mph)
Career
- Operators: JNR; JR East; JR West; JR Hokkaido
- Locale: Japan
- Last run: 24 February 2015
- Preserved: 4
- Disposition: Withdrawn

The Class DD14 (DD14形) was a B'B' wheel arrangement diesel-hydraulic locomotive type operated in Japan as a self-propelled rotary snowplough unit from 1961 to 2015 by the national railway company Japanese National Railways (JNR), and later by East Japan Railway Company (JR East). West Japan Railway Company (JR West), and Hokkaido Railway Company (JR Hokkaido).

== Design ==
Based on the earlier Class DD13 6th-batch locomotives, the Class DD14 was a single-end-cab design with a rotary snowplough unit at the cab end. It was the first diesel-powered rotary snowplough built by JNR. The locomotives had two 500 hp (370 kW) diesel engines. One engine could be used for propulsion with the other driving the rotary snowplough unit, giving a snow-clearing capacity of approximately 3,000 tonnes per hour, or the unit could be operated in multiple with a second locomotive allowing both engines to drive the rotary snowplough, giving a snow-clearing capacity of approximately 4,000 tonnes per hour.

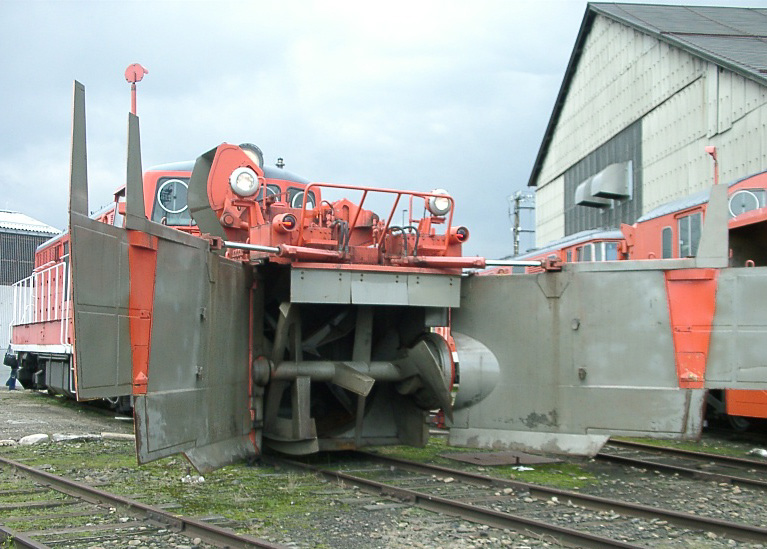
Snowplough detail of DD14 317, October 2001

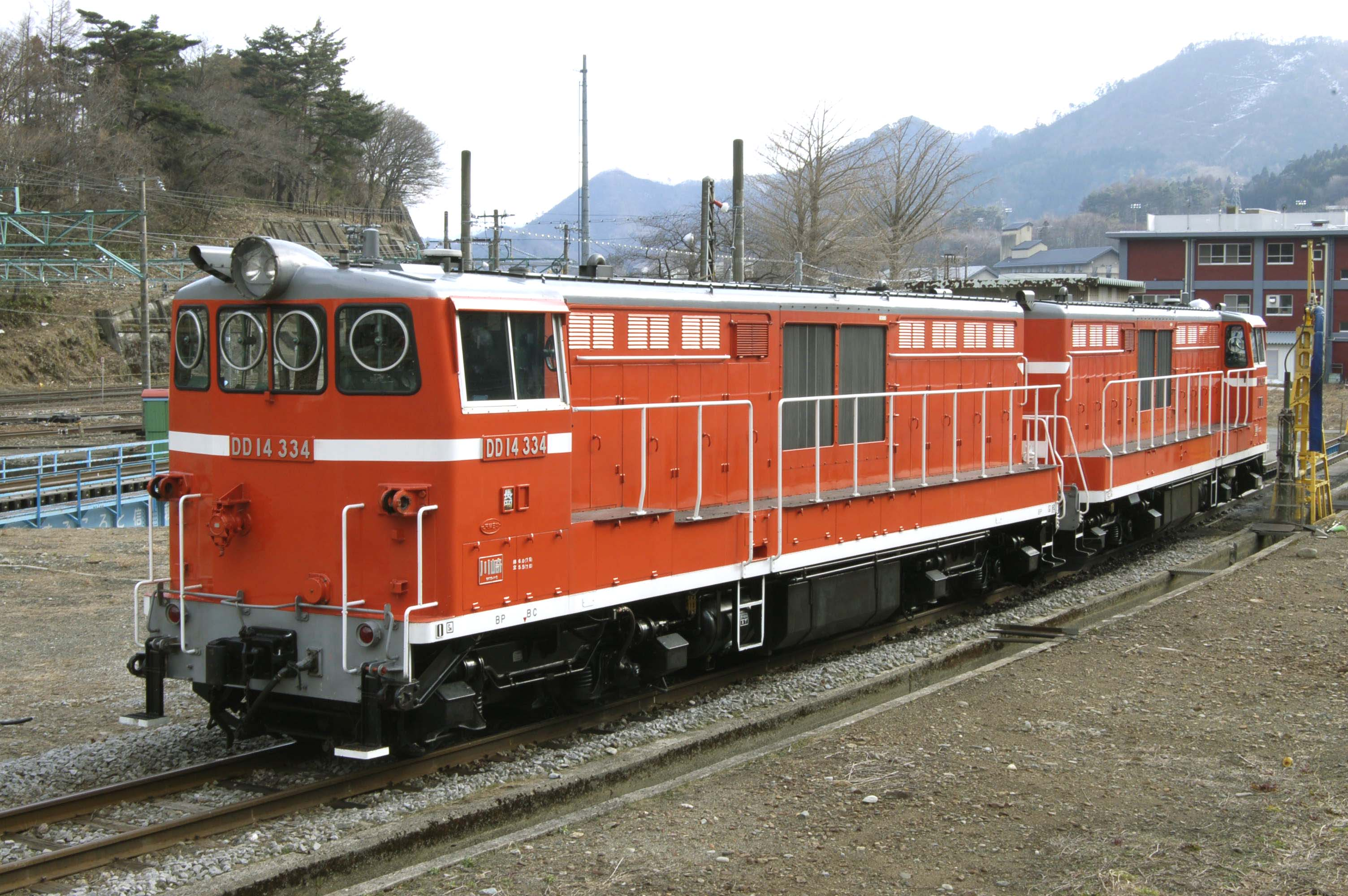
A pair of DD14s with their snowplough units detached, March 2008

== Variants ==
- DD14-0: 8 locomotives built between 1961 and 1965 by Kisha Seizō
- DD14-300: 35 locomotives built between 1966 and 1979 by Kisha Seizō and Kawasaki Heavy Industries

== History ==
By 2005, only nine locomotives remained in service, all operated by JR East. The last remaining locomotives in service, DD14 327 and 332, based at JR East's Nagaoka Depot, made their final run on 24 February 2014.

== Fleet list ==
Locomotive number	Manufacturer	Year built	Works no.	Date withdrawn
DD14 1	Kisha Seizō	1961	2861	?
DD14 2	Kisha Seizō	1961	2907	30 December 1985
DD14 3	Kisha Seizō	1961	2908	10 September 1996
DD14 4	Kisha Seizō	1965	3152	?
DD14 5	Kisha Seizō	1965	3153	?
DD14 6	Kisha Seizō	1965	3154	1 December 1994
DD14 7	Kisha Seizō	1965	3155	1 June 1995
DD14 8	Kisha Seizō	1965	3171	5 November 1998
DD14 301	Kisha Seizō	1966	3222	1 August 1994
DD14 302	Kisha Seizō	1966	3223	14 February 1990
DD14 303	Kisha Seizō	1966	3224	24 March 1993
DD14 304	Kisha Seizō	1966	3225	24 March 1993
DD14 305	Kisha Seizō	1966	3226	2 April 2009
DD14 306	Kisha Seizō	1966	3227	25 July 1998
DD14 307	Kisha Seizō	1968	3260	14 February 1990
DD14 308	Kisha Seizō	1969	3261	18 June 2009
DD14 309	Kisha Seizō	1969	3410	16 June 2000
DD14 310	Kisha Seizō	1969	3437	?
DD14 311	Kisha Seizō	1970	3486	31 March 2000
DD14 312	Kisha Seizō	1971	3528	30 December 1989
DD14 313	Kisha Seizō	1971	3541	17 March 1990
DD14 314	Kisha Seizō	1971	3542	7 April 2003
DD14 315	Kisha Seizō	1971	3543	25 December 1998
DD14 316	Kawasaki	?	?	29 March 1996
DD14 317	Kawasaki	?	?	30 May 2008
DD14 318	Kawasaki	?	?	17 March 1990
DD14 319	Kawasaki	?	?	17 December 1992
DD14 320	Kawasaki	?	?	24 March 1993
DD14 321	Kawasaki	?	?	24 March 1993
DD14 322	Kawasaki	?	?	28 January 1994
DD14 323	Kawasaki	?	?	27 September 1993
DD14 324	Kawasaki	?	?	13 July 1994
DD14 325	Kawasaki	?	?	23 April 2004
DD14 326	Kawasaki	?	?	14 June 2002
DD14 327	Kawasaki	?	?	2015
DD14 328	Kawasaki	?	?	28 September 2009
DD14 329	Kawasaki	?	?	29 March 1996
DD14 330	Kawasaki	?	?	1 November 1994
DD14 331	Kawasaki	?	?	3 July 2003
DD14 332	Kawasaki	?	?	2015
DD14 333	Kawasaki	?	?	21 June 2008
DD14 334	Kawasaki	?	?	21 May 2010
DD14 335	Kawasaki	?	?	31 March 2000

== Preserved examples ==
As of 2012, three Class DD14 locomotives are preserved in Japan, with one locomotive sold to Taiwan High Speed Rail (THSR) in Taiwan.

- DD14 1: Preserved at the Mikasa Railway Museum in Mikasa, Hokkaido
- DD14 312: Preserved privately in Kitami, Hokkaido
- DD14 323: Preserved at the Otaru Museum in Otaru, Hokkaido
- DD14 331: Owned by THSR in Taiwan

Popular model scale brand Kato has made replicas of the snowplow exclusive to Japan.

thumb

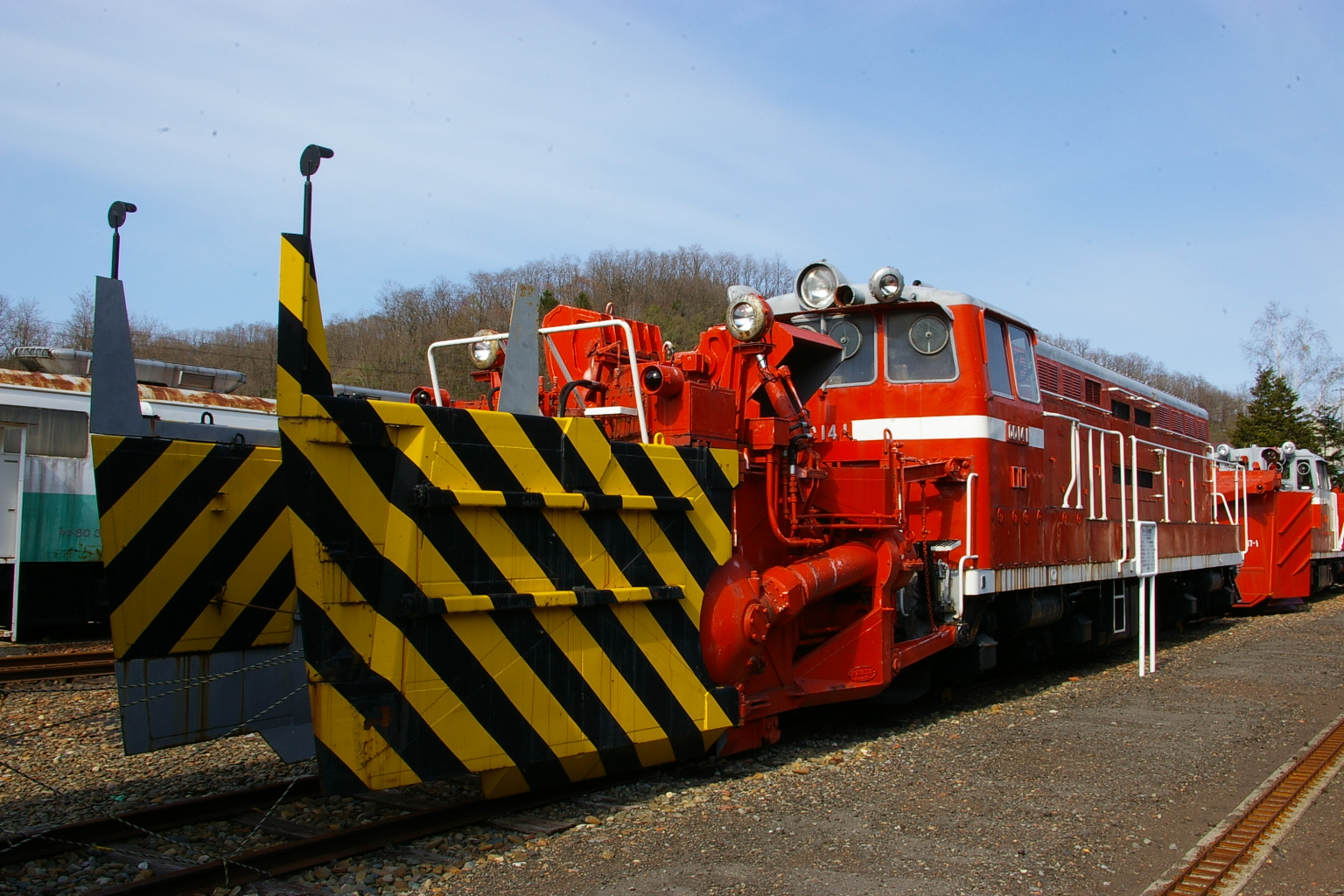
DD14 1 at the Mikasa Railway Museum, May 2007

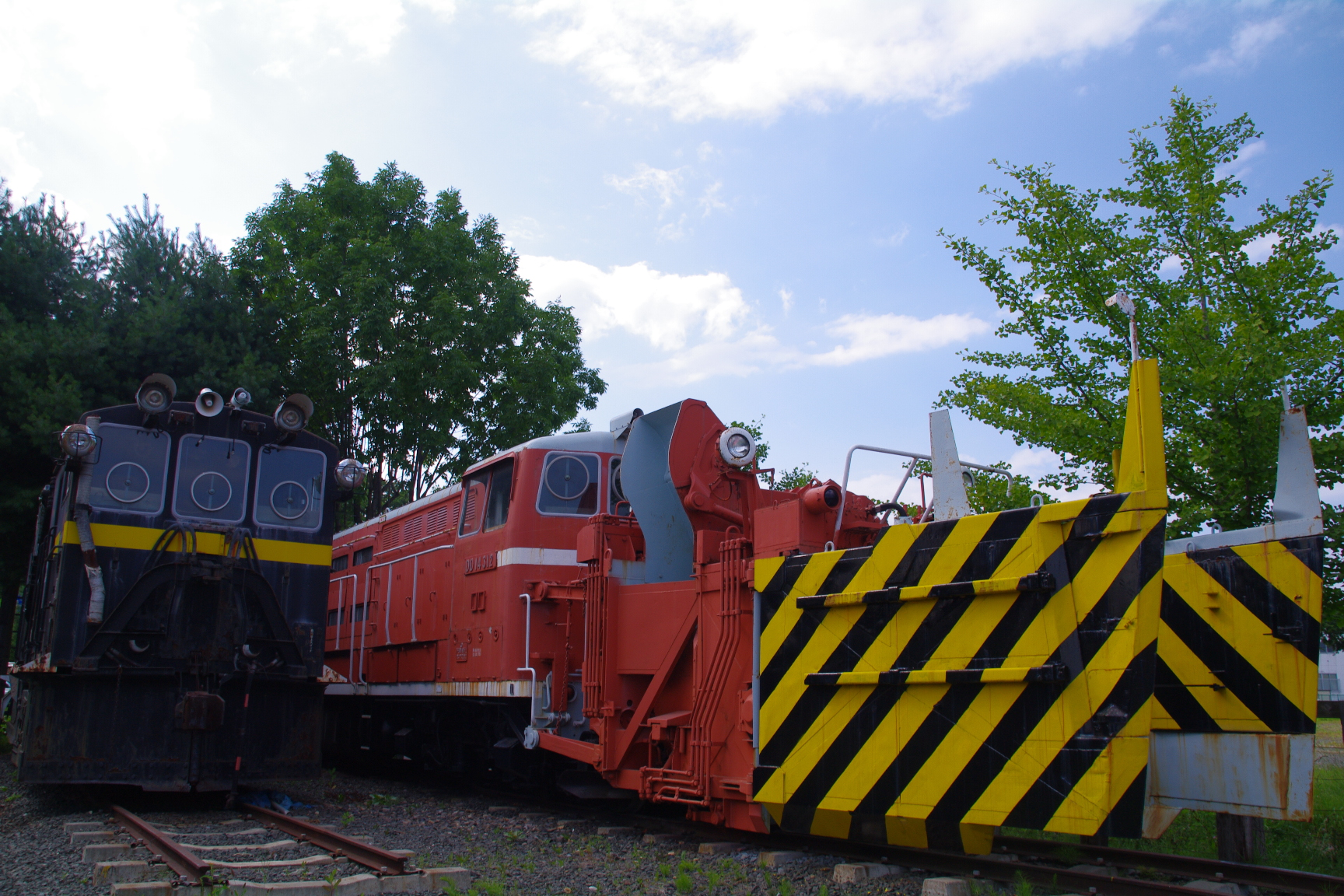
DD14 312 in August 2009

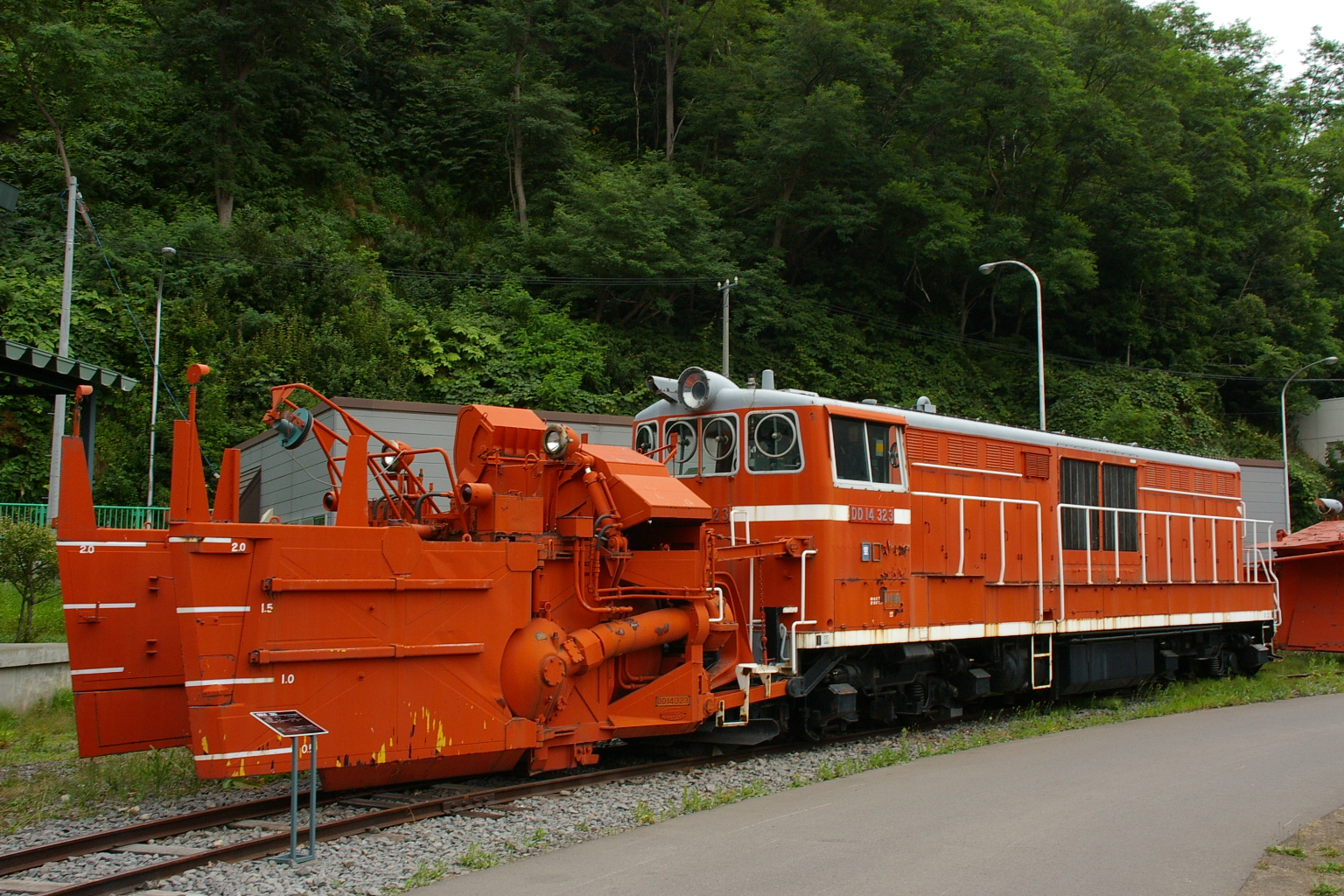
DD14 323 at the Otaru Railway Museum, July 2007

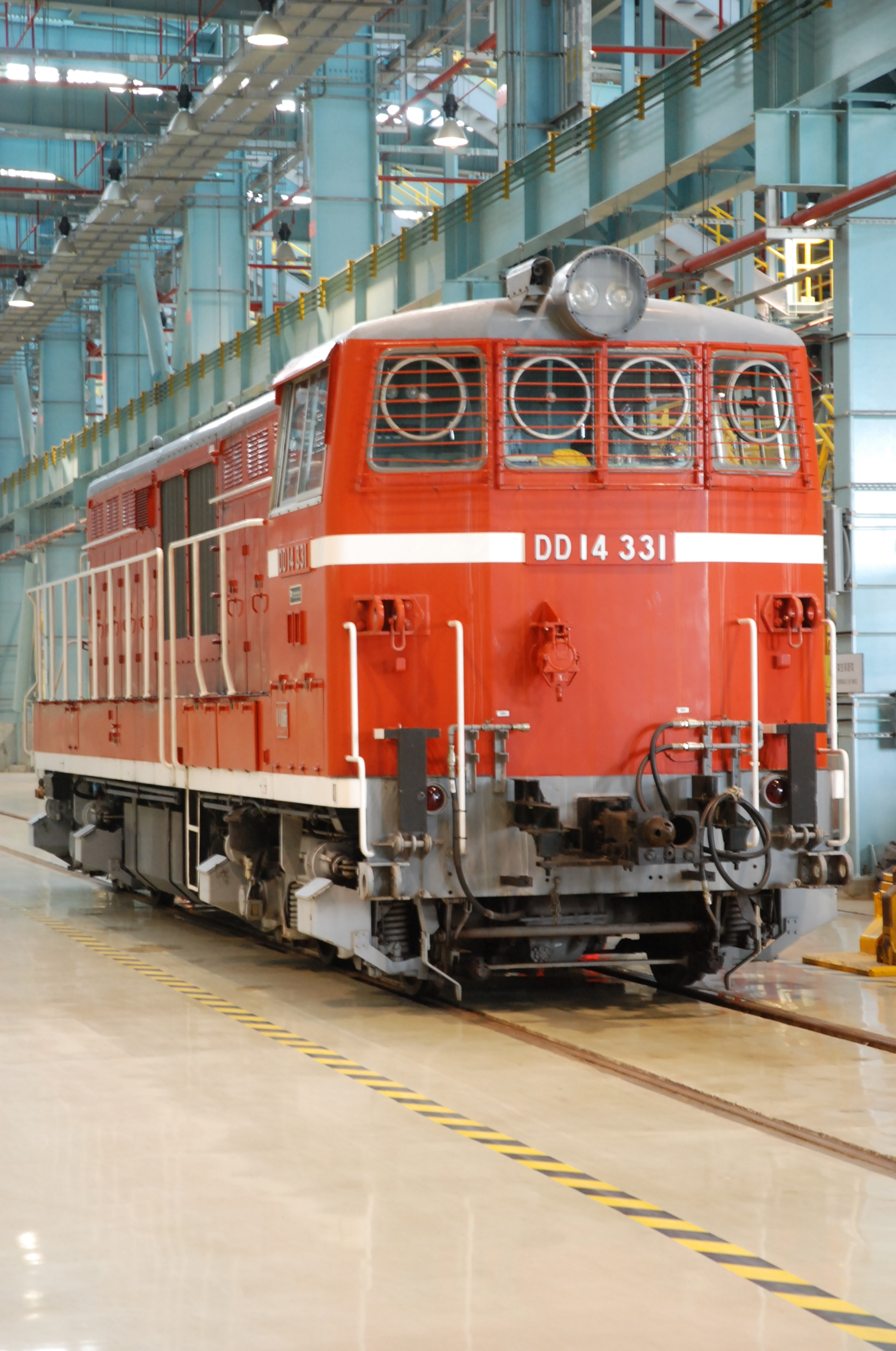
DD14 331 in Taiwan, August 2008

== Related classes ==
- Class DD15 snowplough propulsion unit
- Class DD16 snowplough propulsion unit
- Class DD18 snowplough propulsion unit
- Class DD19 snowplough propulsion unit
- Class DD53 snowplough propulsion unit
- Class DE15 snowplough propulsion unit

== Classification ==
The DD14 classification for this locomotive type is explained below.

- D: Diesel locomotive
- D: Four driving axles
- 14: Locomotive with maximum speed of 85 km/h or less
