= Chōsen Railway Class 810 =

2-8-0 steam locomotive

Chōsen Railway Class 810 Korean State Railway Class 500
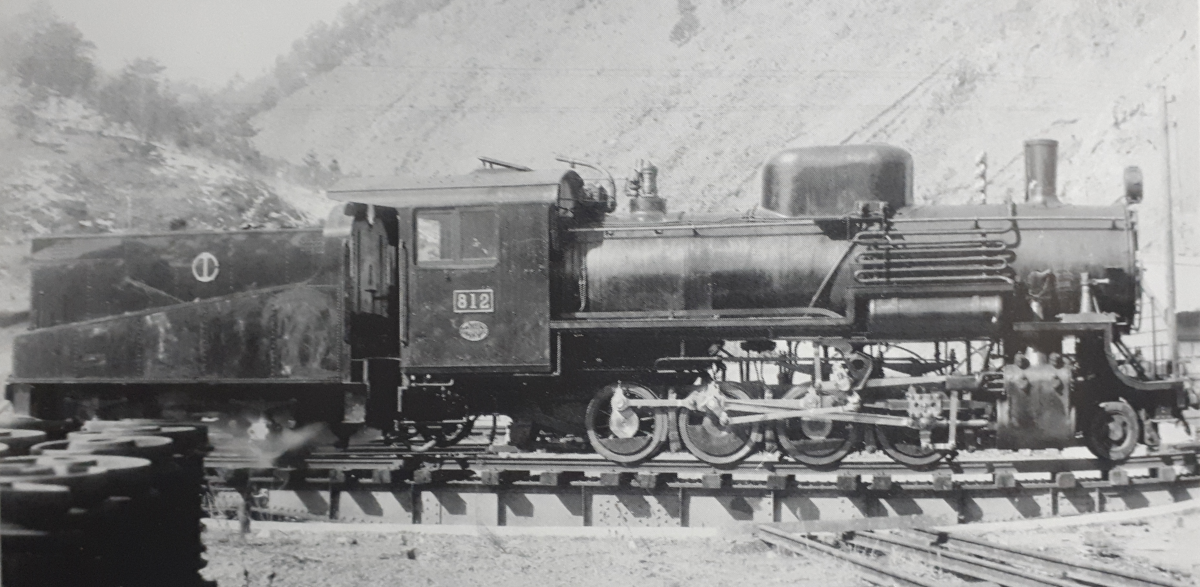
- Builder's photo of Chōsen Railway Class 810 no. 812
Type and origin
- Power type: Steam
- Builder: Kisha Seizō
- Build date: 1935–1936
- Total produced: 8
Specifications
- Configuration
  - Whyte: 2-8-0
- Gauge: 762 mm (2 ft 6 in)
- Driver dia.: 810 mm (32 in)
- Length: 12,668 mm (498.7 in)
- Width: 2,150 mm (85 in)
- Height: 3,200 mm (130 in)
- Total weight: 51.50 t (50.69 long tons)
Performance figures
- Tractive effort: 46.19 kN (10,380 lb_{f})
Career
- Operators: Chōsen Railway; Korean State Railway; Korean National Railroad
- Class: Chōsen Railway: 810; KSR: 500; KNR: ?
- Number in class: 8
- Numbers: Chōsen Railway: 810-817
- Delivered: 1935: 810-813; 1936: 814-817

The Class 810 was a class of steam tender locomotives for freight trains with 2-8-0 wheel arrangement operated by the Chōsen Railway in colonial Korea.

== Description ==
The first four were built for the Chōsen Railway in 1935 by Kisha Seizō of Japan for use on the railway's Hambuk Line, intended to haul iron ore trains; they were numbered 810 through 813. Work to convert this line was converted to standard gauge was completed on 1 May 1940, after which the locomotives were transferred to the railway's Hwanghae Line, Suin Line, and Suryeo Line.

A second batch of four, numbers 814 through 817 were delivered by Kisha Seizō in 1936.

== Postwar ==
After the Liberation and partition of Korea, these locomotives were divided between the Korean State Railway of North Korea and the Korean National Railroad of South Korea. Those which ended up in the North were numbered in the 500 series, with three still surviving - one operational - in 2004.

== Construction ==
Original number	Builder	Year	Works number	Postwar	Notes
810	Kisha Seizō	1935	1340	?	
811	Kisha Seizō	1935	1341	?	
812	Kisha Seizō	1935	1342	KSR 502	
813	Kisha Seizō	1935	1343	?	
814	Kisha Seizō	1936	1413	?	
815	Kisha Seizō	1936	1414	KSR 505	Operational in 2005
816	Kisha Seizō	1936	1415	?	
817	Kisha Seizō	1936	1416	KSR 507	
