= Sentetsu Matei-class locomotive =

4-8-2 steam locomotive

Chosen Government Railway Matei class (マテイ) Korean National Railroad Mateo1 class (마더1) Korean State Railway Madŏha class (마더하)
- Builder's photo of Sentetsu locomotive マテイ5
Type and origin
- Power type: Steam
- Builder: Gyeongseong, Kisha Seizō
- Build date: 1939–1945
- Total produced: 50
Specifications
- Configuration
  - Whyte: 4-8-2
- Gauge: 1,435 mm (4 ft 8 1/2 in)
- Driver dia.: 1,450 mm (57.09 in)
- Length: 23,837 mm (78 ft 2.5 in)
- Width: 3,200 mm (10 ft 6 in)
- Height: 4,700 mm (15 ft 5 in)
- Loco weight: 116.00 t (114.17 long tons)
- Tender weight: 85.80 t (84.44 long tons)
- Fuel capacity: 14.00 t (13.78 long tons)
- Water cap.: 35.0 m^{3} (9,200 US gal)
- Tender cap.: 9.60 t (9.4 long tons) (coal), 24 m^{3} (6,300 US gal) (water)
- Firebox
  - Grate area: 6.20 m^{2} (66.7 sq ft)
- Boiler
  - Small tubes: 75 x 57 mm (2.2 in)
  - Large tubes: 120 x 90 mm (3.5 in)
- Boiler pressure: 15.0 kgf/cm^{2} (213 psi)
- Heating surface
  - Firebox: 27.40 m^{2} (294.9 sq ft)
  - Tubes: 252.6 m^{2} (2,719 sq ft)
  - Total surface: 280.00 m^{2} (3,013.9 sq ft)
- Superheater
  - Heating area: 113.70 m^{2} (1,223.9 sq ft)
- Cylinders: 2
- Cylinder size: 600 mm × 710 mm (23.622 in × 27.953 in)
- Valve gear: Walschaerts
Performance figures
- Maximum speed: 80 km/h (50 mph)
- Tractive effort: 221.0 kN (49,700 lb_{f})
Career
- Operators: Chosen Government Railway; Korean National Railroad; Korean State Railway
- Class: Sentetsu: マテイ; KNR: 마터1; KSR: 마더하
- Number in class: Sentetsu: 50
- Numbers: Sentetsu: マテイ1–マテイ50
- Delivered: 1939–1945
- Preserved: 1
- Disposition: One preserved, remainder scrapped.

The Matei class (マテイ) locomotives were a class of steam tender locomotives of the Chosen Government Railway (Sentetsu) with 4-8-2 wheel arrangement. The "Mate" name came from the American naming system for steam locomotives, under which locomotives with 4-8-2 wheel arrangement were called "Mountain".

== Description ==
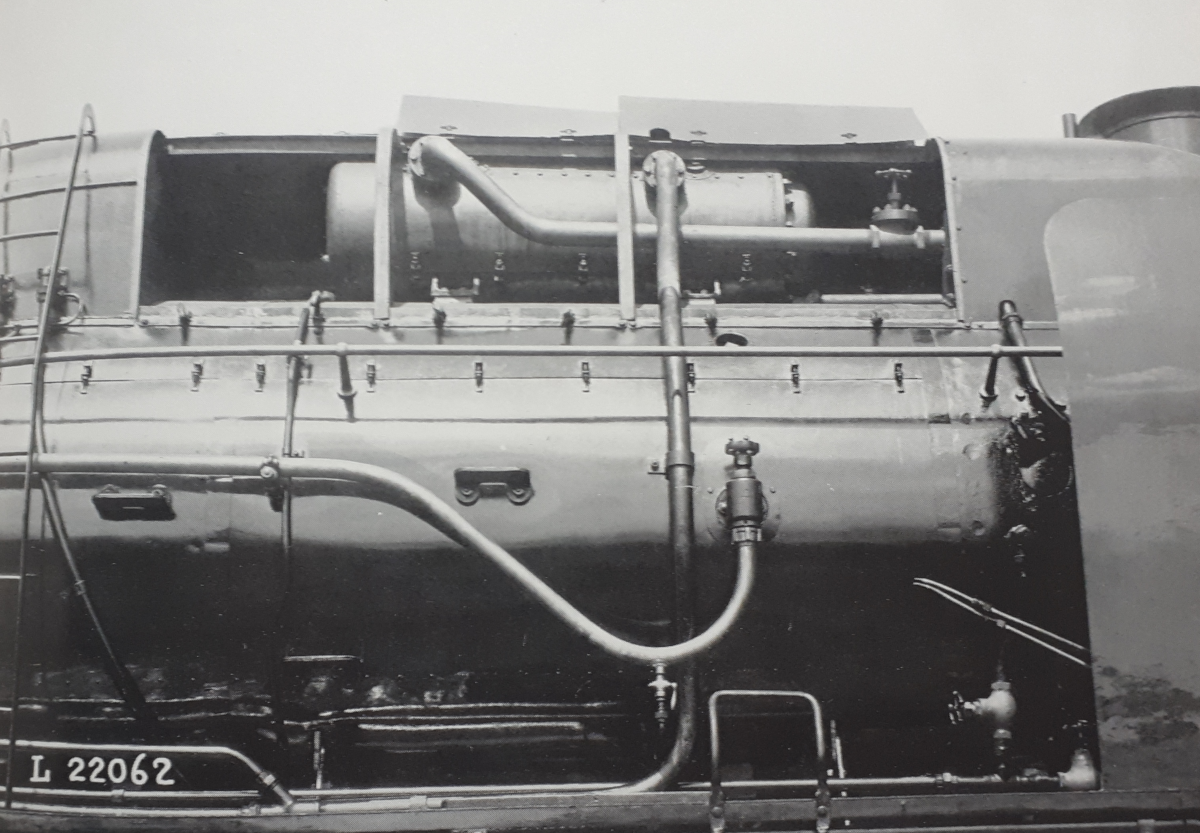
View of the feedwater heater on a Sentetsu Matei-class locomotive

With the development of mining operations in the northern part of Korea, traffic volumes increased significantly, and Sentetsu found a need for a locomotive with strong pulling power suitable for use on mountainous lines with sharp curves and steep slopes. The locomotive designed in response to this need was not of the 2-8-2 Mika type, which was Sentetsu's standard freight locomotive type, but of the Mate type with 4-8-2 wheel arrangement; the leading bogie was designed to reduce flange wear on the wheels. The resulting Matei class locomotives became a mainstay on long-distance freight trains on mountainous lines.

The Gyeongseong Works undertook two major design projects at the end of the 1930s: that of the Pashiko-class express passenger locomotive, and the Matei-class freight locomotives for use on steep mountain lines. Each was the largest of their type operated by Sentetsu, and the first unit of each type was rolled out in 1939. Both had a heating area of 6.2 m^{2} (67 sq ft) and were equipped with automatic stokers. After the first two were built at Gyeongseong in 1939 and 1940, a further 48 were built from 1941 through to the end of Japanese rule by Kisha Seizō in Japan.

== Postwar ==
After the Liberation and subsequent partition of Korea, both the Korean National Railroad (KNR) in the South and the Korean State Railway (Kukch'ŏl) in the North operated Matei-class locomotives. Not all survived the Pacific War, as there were only 77 of 83 built of both classes that remained in 1946; of these, 33 went to the Korean National Railroad in the South, and 44 to the Korean State Railway in the North. The six locomotives of both classes that remain unaccounted for were likely either destroyed during the Pacific War or were possibly taken by Soviet Army, which during its occupation of North Korea took a large number of locomotives back to the USSR.

=== Korean National Railroad Mateo1 class (마터1) ===
Of the 33 4-8-2s that went to the KNR in the 1947 division of assets, most were likely Matei-class, which were designated 마터1 class by the KNR; the identities of twelve of these are known for certain.

KNR number	Sentetsu number	Builder	Year	Notes
마터1-5	マテイ5	Kisha Seizō	1941	
마터1-14	マテイ14	Kisha Seizō	1943	
마터1-22	マテイ22	Kisha Seizō	1943	
마터1-23	マテイ23	Kisha Seizō	1943	
마터1-24	マテイ24	Kisha Seizō	1943	
마터1-25	マテイ25	Kisha Seizō	1943	
마터1-27	マテイ27	Kisha Seizō	1943	
마터1-30	マテイ30	Kisha Seizō	1943	
마터1-31	マテイ31	Kisha Seizō	1943	
마터1-44	マテイ44	Kisha Seizō	1944~1945	
마터1-48	マテイ48	Kisha Seizō	1944~1945	
마터1-49	マテイ49	Kisha Seizō	1944~1945	

=== Korean State Railway Madŏha class (마더하) ===
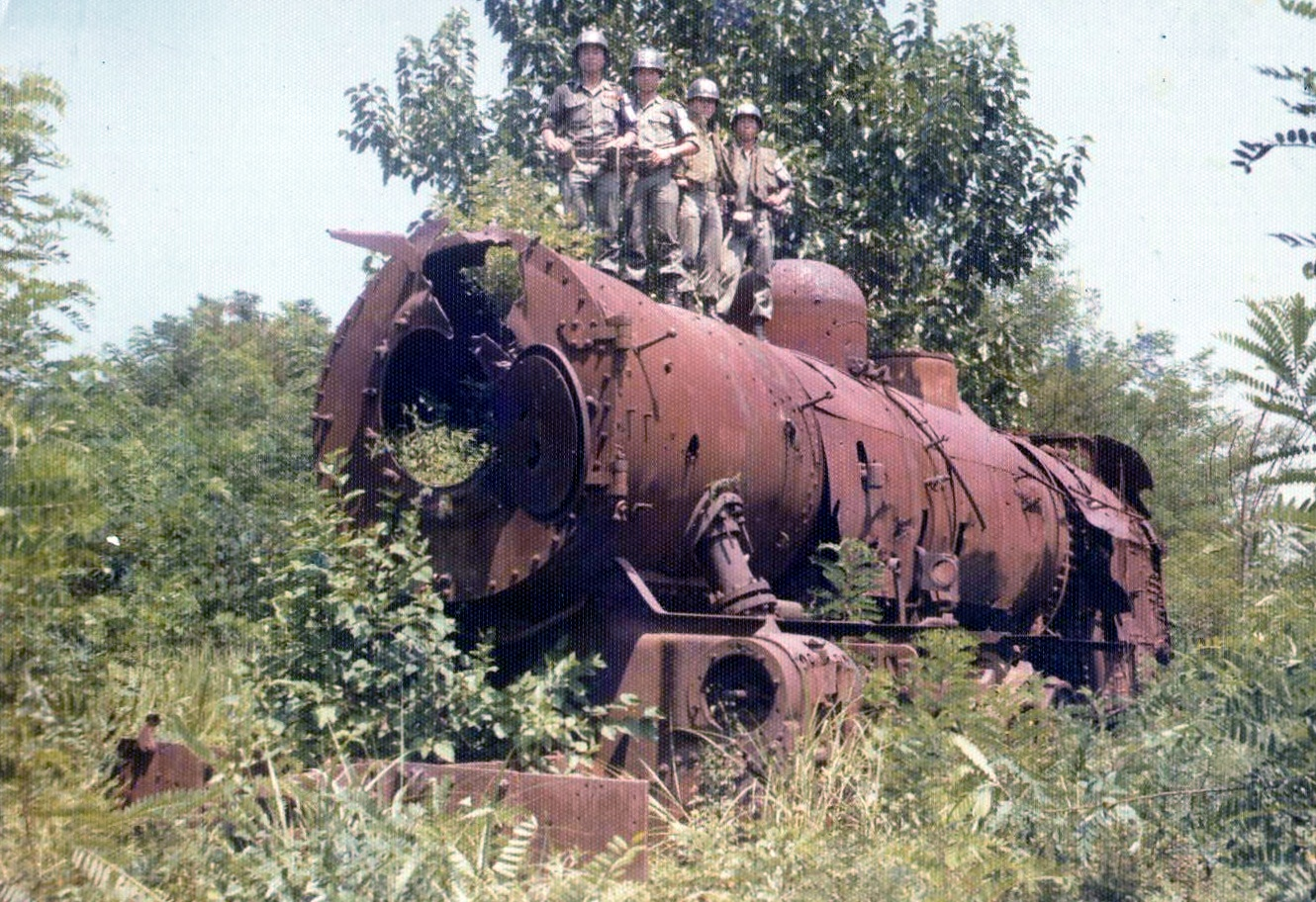
The ruins of マテイ10 at Jangdan in 1976

Around eleven Matei class locomotives went to the north, where they were initially designated 마더하 class (Madŏha) by Kukch'ŏl; later, around the 1970s, they were renumbered in the 7100 series, retaining their original running number but replacing the "마더하" with a "7". The identities of two are known for certain.

KNR number	Sentetsu number	Builder	Year	Notes
마더하10 (2200)	マテイ10	Kisha Seizō	1942	Destroyed in 1950 still carrying Sentetsu number plates.
마더하33 (2378)	マテイ33	Kisha Seizō	1943	Seen stored at Sinŭiju in 2003, awaiting scrapping.

On 31 December 1950, a passenger train operated by Kukch'ŏl, consisting of マテイ10 - still wearing Sentetsu number plates - and 25 cars, running on the former Kyŏngŭi Line from Hanp'o to Munsan, was ordered to stop at Changdan by the US Army and was destroyed. The locomotive is now on display at Imjingak.

== Construction ==
Original number	Builder	Year	Works no.	Postwar owner	Postwar number	Notes
マテイ1	Gyeongseong Works	1939				
マテイ2	Gyeongseong Works	1940				
マテイ3	Kisha Seizō	1941	2055			
マテイ4	Kisha Seizō	1941	2056			
マテイ5	Kisha Seizō	1941	2057	KNR	마터1-5	
マテイ6	Kisha Seizō	1941	2058			
マテイ7	Kisha Seizō	1941	2059			
マテイ8	Kisha Seizō	1942	2198			
マテイ9	Kisha Seizō	1942	2199			
マテイ10	Kisha Seizō	1942	2200	KSR	마더하10	Destroyed in 1950 still carrying Sentetsu number plates.
マテイ11	Kisha Seizō	1942	2201			
マテイ12	Kisha Seizō	1942	2202			
マテイ13	Kisha Seizō	1943	2304			
マテイ14	Kisha Seizō	1943	2305	KNR	마터1-14	
マテイ15	Kisha Seizō	1943	2306			
マテイ16	Kisha Seizō	1943	2307			
マテイ17	Kisha Seizō	1943	2308			
マテイ18	Kisha Seizō	1943	2309			
マテイ19	Kisha Seizō	1943	2310			
マテイ20	Kisha Seizō	1943	2311			
マテイ21	Kisha Seizō	1943	2312			
マテイ22	Kisha Seizō	1943	2313	KNR	마터1-22	
マテイ23	Kisha Seizō	1943	2342	KNR	마터1-23	
マテイ24	Kisha Seizō	1943	2343	KNR	마터1-24	
マテイ25	Kisha Seizō	1943	2344	KNR	마터1-25	
マテイ26	Kisha Seizō	1943	2345			
マテイ27	Kisha Seizō	1943	2346	KNR	마터1-27	
マテイ28	Kisha Seizō	1943	2347			
マテイ29	Kisha Seizō	1943	2348			
マテイ30	Kisha Seizō	1943	2349	KNR	마터1-30	
マテイ31	Kisha Seizō	1943	2350	KNR	마터1-31	
マテイ32	Kisha Seizō	1943	2351			
マテイ33	Kisha Seizō	1944	2378	KSR	마더하33 → 7133	
マテイ34	Kisha Seizō	1944	2379			
マテイ35	Kisha Seizō	1944	2400			
マテイ36	Kisha Seizō	1944	2401			
マテイ37	Kisha Seizō	1944	2402			
マテイ38	Kisha Seizō	1944	2403			
マテイ39	Kisha Seizō	1944	2404			
マテイ40	Kisha Seizō	1944	2405			
マテイ41	Kisha Seizō	1944	2406			
マテイ42	Kisha Seizō	1944	2407			
マテイ43	Kisha Seizō	1944	2408			
マテイ44	Kisha Seizō	1944	2460	KNR	마터1-44	
マテイ45	Kisha Seizō	1944	2461			
マテイ46	Kisha Seizō	1944	2462			
マテイ47	Kisha Seizō	1944	2463			
マテイ48	Kisha Seizō	1945	2464	KNR	마터1-48	
マテイ49	Kisha Seizō	1945	2465	KNR	마터1-49	
マテイ50	Kisha Seizō	1945	2466			
