= Sentetsu Pashiko-class locomotive =

4-6-2 steam locomotive

Chosen Government Railway Pashiko class (パシコ) Korean National Railroad Pasi5 class (파시5) Korean State Railway Pasio class (바시오)
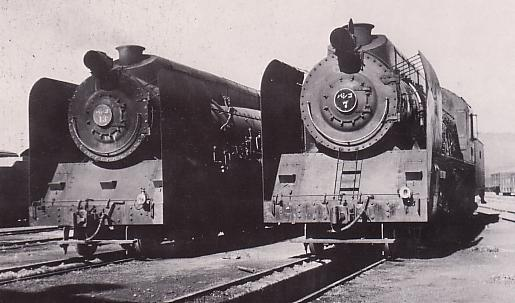
- Sentetsu Pashiko class locomotives パシコ7 and パシコ13
Type and origin
- Power type: Steam
- Builder: Gyeongseong Works, Kawasaki
- Build date: 1939 Gyeongseong (2); 1940–1944 Kawasaki (40)
- Total produced: 40
Specifications
- Configuration
  - Whyte: 4-6-2
- Gauge: 1,435 mm (4 ft 8 1/2 in)
- Driver dia.: 1,850 mm (73 in)
- Length: 23,756 mm (77 ft 11.3 in)
- Width: 3,170 mm (10 ft 5 in)
- Height: 4,700 mm (15 ft 5 in)
- Loco weight: 112.00 t (110.23 long tons)
- Tender weight: 84.00 t (82.67 long tons)
- Fuel capacity: 14.0 t (13.8 long tons)
- Water cap.: 35,000 L (9,200 US gal)
- Firebox
  - Grate area: 6.20 m^{2} (66.7 sq ft)
- Boiler
  - Small tubes: 75 x 51 mm (2.0 in)
  - Large tubes: 120 x 90 mm (3.5 in)
- Boiler pressure: 15.0 kgf/cm^{2} (213 psi)
- Heating surface
  - Firebox: 27.40 m^{2} (294.9 sq ft)
  - Tubes: 252.60 m^{2} (2,719.0 sq ft)
  - Total surface: 280.00 m^{2} (3,013.9 sq ft)
- Superheater
  - Heating area: 113.70 m^{2} (1,223.9 sq ft)
- Cylinders: 2
- Cylinder size: 580 mm × 660 mm (23 in × 26 in)
- Valve gear: Walschaerts
Performance figures
- Maximum speed: 110 km/h (68 mph)
- Tractive effort: 162.0 kN (36,400 lb_{f})
Career
- Operators: Chosen Government Railway; Korean National Railroad; Korean State Railway
- Class: Sentetsu: パシコ; KNR: 바시5; KSR: 바시오
- Number in class: Sentetsu: 42
- Numbers: Sentetsu: パシコ1–パシコ42
- Delivered: 1939–1944
- Preserved: 1
- Disposition: One preserved, remainder scrapped.

The Pashiko class (パシコ) locomotives were a group of steam tender locomotives of the Chosen Government Railway (Sentetsu) with 4-6-2 wheel arrangement. The "Pashi" name came from the American naming system for steam locomotives, under which locomotives with 4-6-2 wheel arrangement were called "Pacific".

In all, Sentetsu owned 144 locomotives of all Pashi classes, of which 141 survived the war; of these, 73 went to the Korean National Railroad in South Korea and 68 to the Korean State Railway in North Korea.

== Description ==
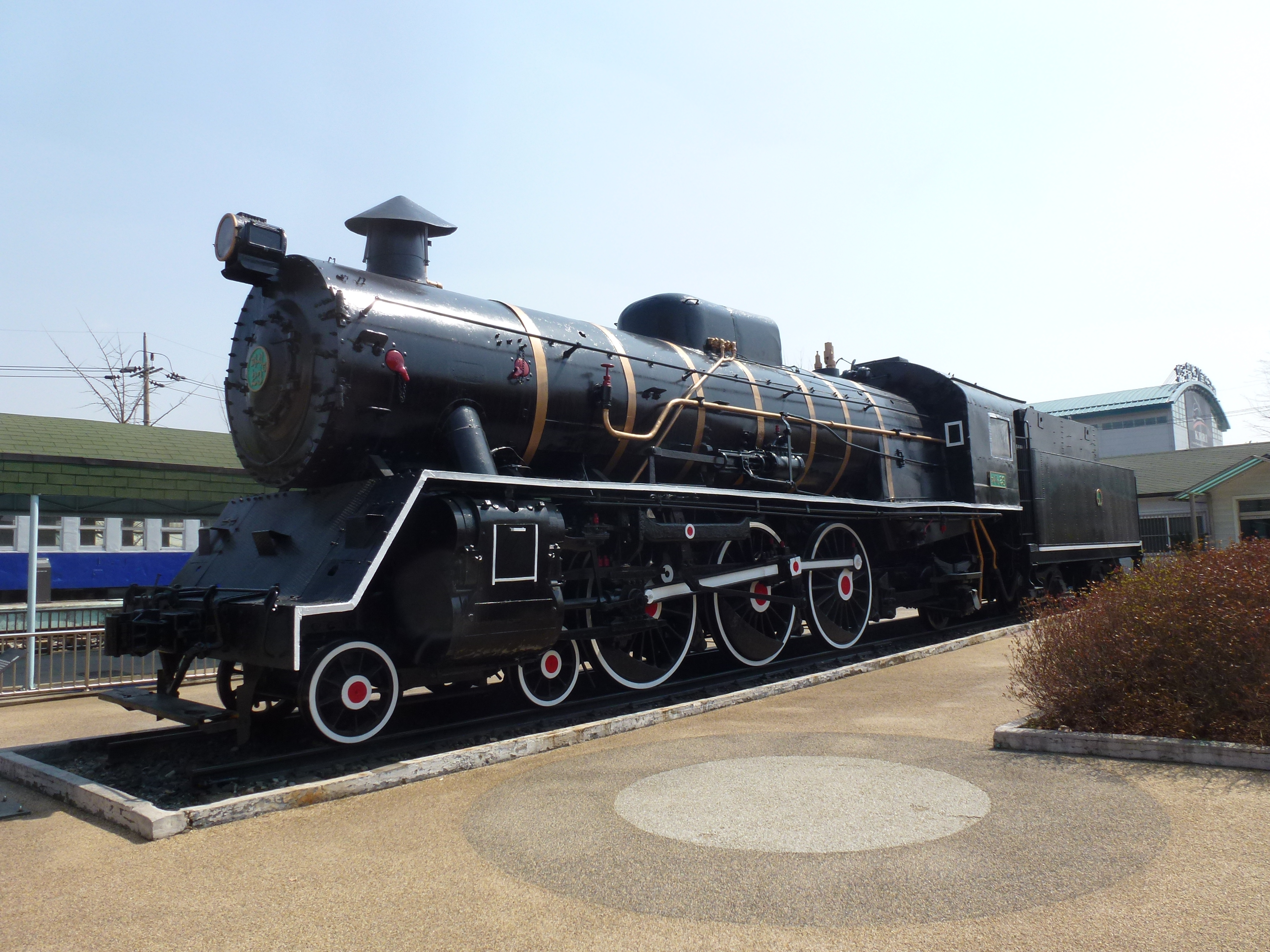
KNR Pasi5-23 on display at the Korail Railroad Museum

Sentetsu designed the Pashiko class as a successor to the Pashishi class, with the first example, パシコ1, being delivered from Sentetsu's Gyeongseong Works in October 1939, and the second following a month later. They were not only the largest of all Sentetsu passenger locomotives in size, but at 159.8 t (157.3 long tons) they were the heaviest of all Sentetsu locomotives of any type, and with a maximum speed of 110 km/h (68 mph) they were the fastest as well.

Like the Matei class, which was the largest of all Sentetsu's freight locomotives, the Pashiko class had a firegrate area of 6.2 m^{2} (67 sq ft), and like the Pashishi and its related classes, it was designed to use lignite abundant in Korea, which is less efficient than anthracite and thus requires a large heating area, and featured a combustion chamber firebox and a conical boiler. Unlike the other Pashi classes, which had drivers of 1,750 mm (69 in) diameter, the Pashiko had even larger drivers of 1,850 mm (73 in).

Timeline of Pashiko production for Sentetsu
Year	Running Number	Builder	Total
Oct 1939	パシコ1	Gyeongseong	1
Nov 1939	パシコ2	Gyeongseong	2
1940	パシコ3–パシシ12	Kawasaki	10
1941	パシコ13–パシシ22	Kawasaki	10
1942	パシコ23–パシシ35	Kawasaki	13
1943	パシコ36–パシシ40	Kawasaki	5
1944	パシコ41–パシシ42	Kawasaki	2
Builder totals		Gyeongseong	2
Builder totals		Kawasaki	40
Total			42

== Postwar ==
After the Liberation and partition of Korea, they were divided between North and South, but the specifics of which engine went where are unclear.

=== Korean National Railroad 파시5 (Pasi5) class ===
At least twenty Pashiko class engines went south to the Korean National Railroad, where they became 파시5 (Pasi5) class, and they were widely used on passenger trains until at least 1967. 파시5-5 was partially streamlined and given a special livery of black with white and red trim in the mid-1950s by the US Army Transportation Corps railway crews.

Known KNR 파시5-class locomotives
KNR number	Sentetsu number	Builder	Year	Notes
파시5-1	パシコ1	Gyeongseong	1939	
파시5-2	パシコ2	Gyeongseong	1939	
파시5-3	パシコ3	Kawasaki	1940	
파시5-4	パシコ4	Kawasaki	1940	
파시5-5	パシコ5	Kawasaki	1940	Semi-streamlined by USATC crews after the Korean War.
파시5-10	パシコ10	Kawasaki	1940	
파시5-11	パシコ11	Kawasaki	1940	
파시5-12	パシコ12	Kawasaki	1940	Derelict by 1953.
파시5-16	パシコ16	Kawasaki	1941	
파시5-17	パシコ17	Kawasaki	1941	
파시5-18	パシコ18	Kawasaki	1941	
파시5-19	パシコ19	Kawasaki	1941	
파시5-20	パシコ20	Kawasaki	1941	
파시5-21	パシコ21	Kawasaki	1941	
파시5-23	パシコ23	Kawasaki	1942	Works number 2649. Preserved at the Korean Railway Museum.
파시5-24	パシコ24	Kawasaki	1942	
파시5-26	パシコ26	Kawasaki	1942	
파시5-30	パシコ30	Kawasaki	1942	
파시5-31	パシコ31	Kawasaki	1942	
파시5-37	パシコ37	Kawasaki	1943	Still in service in 1968.
파시5-38	パシコ38	Kawasaki	1943	

=== Korean State Railway 바시오 (Pasio) class ===
The locomotives taken over by the Korean State Railway were initially designated 바시오 (Pasio) class. The total number, their service lives and subsequent fates are unknown, but they were probably retired by the end of the 1960s.
