= Imjingak =

Park in Paju, South Korea

Coordinates: 37.8896°N 126.7401°E

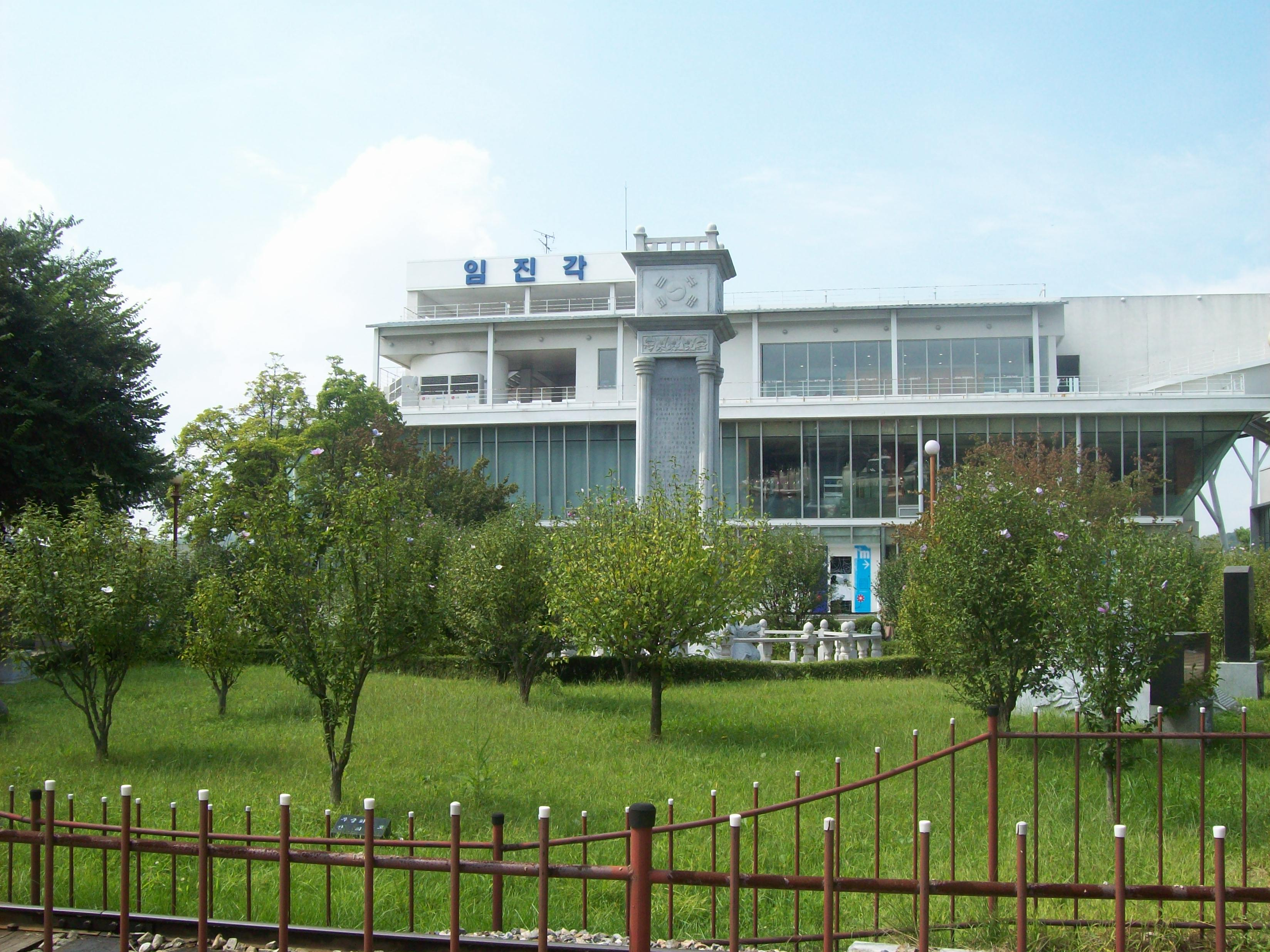
Imjingak

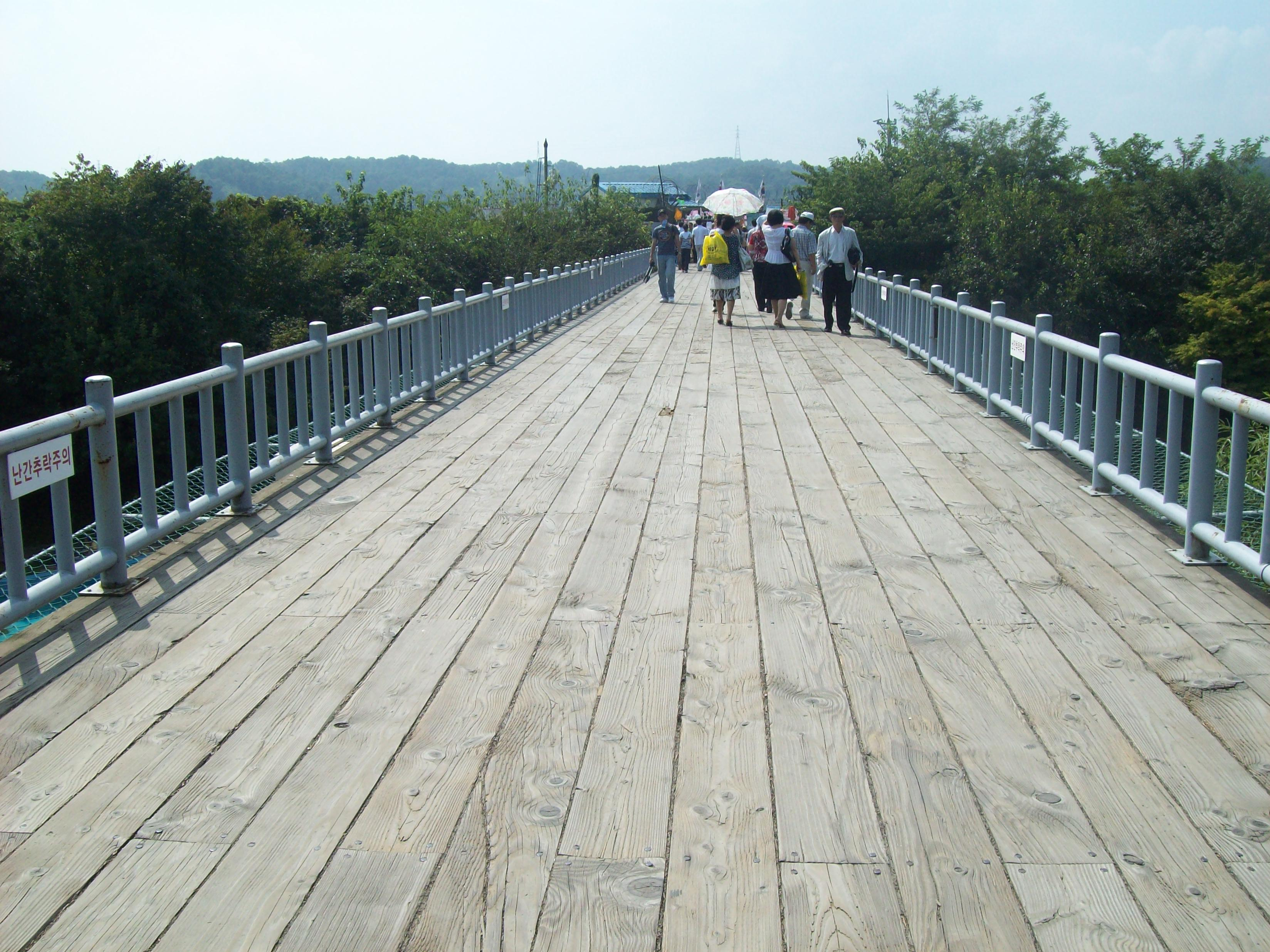
Bridge of Freedom

Imjingak (Korean: 임진각; Hanja: 臨津閣), and sometimes in English called the Imjingak resort, is a park located on the banks of the Imjin River along the tracks of the former Gyeongui Train Line outside the city of Paju, South Korea. The park has many statues and monuments regarding the Korean War. There is also a restaurant, an observation deck, a pool in the shape of the Korean peninsula, and even a small amusement park.

The park was built in 1972 to console those from both sides who are unable to return to their hometowns, friends and families because of the division of Korea and currently receives approximately 1.2 million visitors per year.

Imjingak is where the "Freedom Bridge" lies. Crossing the Imjin river, it is a former railroad bridge which was used by repatriated POWs/soldiers returning from the North. It is more famous, however, for serving until 1998 as the only point of egress from South Korea onto the DMZ, other than Liberty Bridge (which was controlled by the South Korean Army), and the only direct link to Camp Greaves, Liberty Bell, and Panmunjom. This is not to be confused with the "bridge of freedom" which is merely an access bridge to the main span that allowed the one-way southbound traffic to pass by while northbound traffic stood waiting its turn to cross; it now crosses a stream adjacent to the Imjin river and connects with the North-South railway.

== Memorials and monuments ==
=== Second Infantry Division Memorial ===
The 2nd Infantry Division (2ID) was the first major US unit to reach Korea from the continental United States on July 23, 1950. Relieving the 540-man task force of the 24th Infantry Division who had immediately deployed from Itazuke Air Base in Japan at the start of hostilities one month earlier, the 2ID soon found themselves engaging with the Korean People's Army (KPA) in a 16-day battle in which it is said the division's clerks, bandsmen, technical and supply personnel joined in the fight to defend against the attackers, eventually forcing a withdrawal of the KPA forces.

The 2nd Infantry Division is unique in that it is the only U.S. Army division that is partially made up of South Korean soldiers, called KATUSAs (Korean Augmentation to the U.S. Army). Some 27,000 KATUSAs served with the U.S. forces during the course of the Korean War.

2ID is still stationed in Korea where its current primary mission is the defense of South Korea with its 10,000 troops deployed in Korea accounting for about 35% of the United States Forces Korea personnel.

The 2ID Memorial at Imjingak is dedicated to all the brave men of the 2ID who sacrificed their lives for Korea.

=== 187th Airborne "Rakkasans" Memorial ===
The advance party of the 3rd Battalion 187th Infantry Regiment of the Rakkasans was the first to arrive in Korea, arriving at Kimpo Airfield on 23 September, 1950, placed under the operational control of the First Marine Division. The 187th led the second and last parachute assault in Korea on 23 March 1951 as part of Operation Tomahawk.

During the Korean War, three members of the regiment were awarded the Medal of Honor: Lester Hammond, Jr., Rodolfo P. Hernandez and Richard G. Wilson.

=== Chamorros of Guam Memorial ===
Approximately 1,000 Guamanians served with the US military during the Korean War with 20 Chamorro making the ultimate sacrifice.

The Chamorros of Guam Memorial recognizes their sacrifice at Imjingak with an identical memorial located in Hagåtña, Guam.

=== Japanese American Korean War Veteran Memorial ===
Much like World War II, many Japanese Americans joined their fellow countrymen and volunteered to serve in the Korean War. The Korean War would be the first time troops were no longer segregated by race, and the Japanese Americans joined together with Anglo Americans, African Americans, Latin Americans, and South Korean troops in integrated units.

The Japanese American Korean War Veterans Association erected a monument recognizing their efforts on May 24, 1997, listing the names of 255 Japanese Americans who were killed in the Korean War.

More than 300 people attended the official dedication ceremony in 2001, with 112 Japanese American Korean War veterans, their families, friends, various Korean federal, state and local government entities, U.S. government representatives, news media, and the U.S. Army 2nd Infantry Division commander, division band and personnel in attendance.

=== Mangbaeddan ===
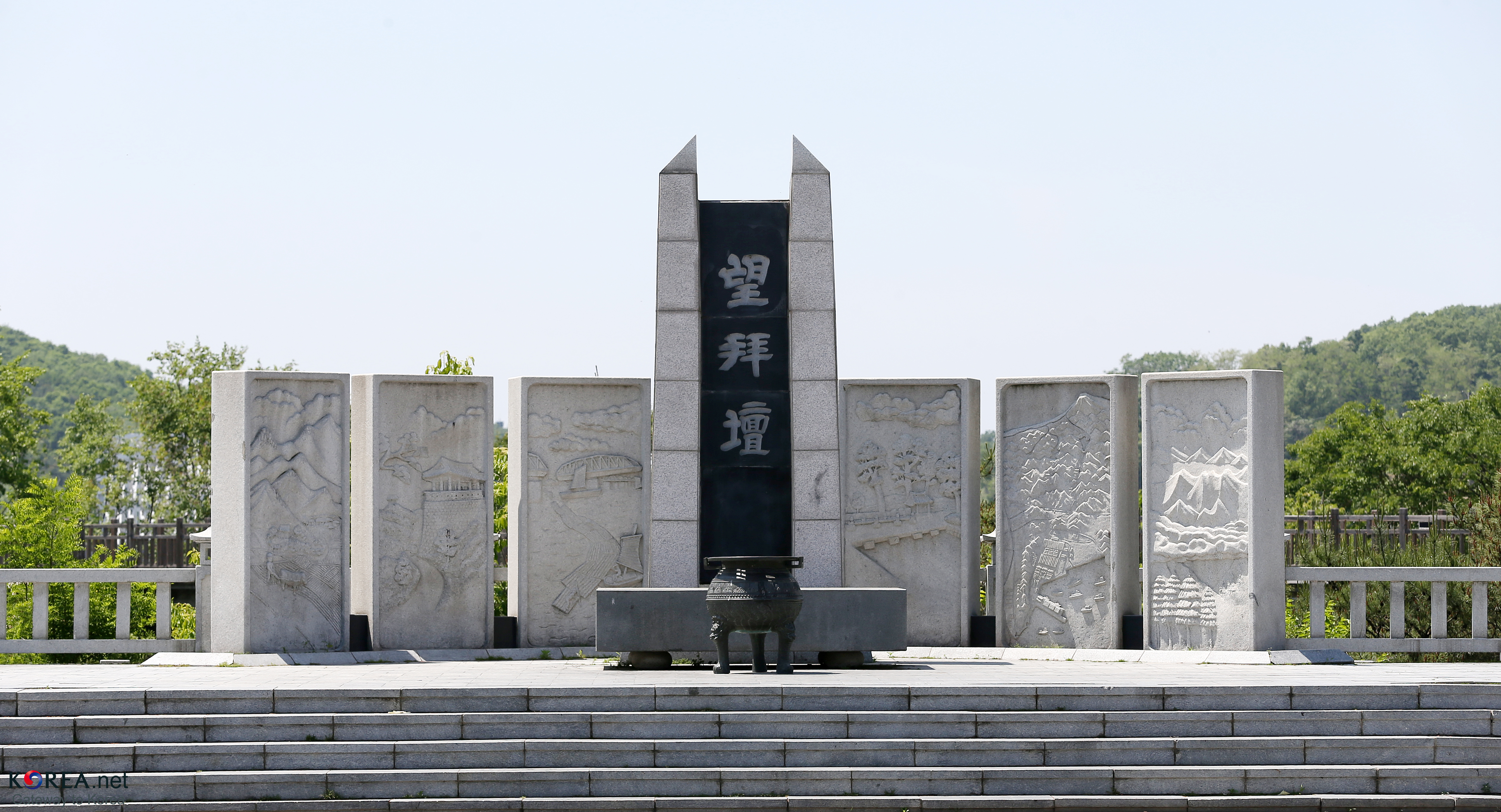
Mangbaeddan

Mangbaeddan is a memorial, which enables displaced people whose hometowns are located within North Korea to bow down to their parents or family in North Korea as a sign of respect during cultural events such as New Years and Chuseok (the Korean Mid Autumn Festival, which usually entails paying respect to your elders and ancestors). This memorial holds many sorrowful memories of separated families during the Korean War.

=== Monument to US Forces in the Korean War ===
The South Korean Ministry of Defense built the US Forces monument to commemorate noble sacrifices and achievements of US troops, and remember the 37,000 Americans who died and the 8,100 MIAs and POWs who gave their all in defense of the Korean people.

Built on October 3, 1975, triangular shaped sculptures symbolize the army, marines, air force, and the naval forces support for each other, and the stone in the center symbolizes that all ROK citizens preserve the spirit of those who gave their lives in the war.

=== Peace Train ===
The last train to cross the border between North and South Korea, a military transport delivering supplies to UN forces following MacArthur's inland push in 1950, became stuck at Hanpo Station in Hwanghe-do in what is now North Korea on December 31, 1950 due to Chinese troops ahead. Unable to turn around, the conductor attempted to back the train back down to Munsan but was stopped by US troops who decided that rather than risk the train falling into North Korean hands, were ordered to destroy the train. The locomotive was a KNR Mateo1 Class.

The rusted, bullet-riddled, and shell-riddled locomotive can be found in the park at Imjingak, near the destroyed Dokgae Railroad Bridge that crosses the Imjin River. In 2004 the rusted locomotive was registered as a Cultural Heritage site and is a visual reminder of the length of time the border has been closed in the hope trains will once again cross freely.

== Public transportation ==
=== Railroad ===
Ten minute walk from Imjingak Station of Gyeongui Line (For an admission of Dorasan Station, tourists must pass through a separate procedure.)

==== Bus ====
1. 058 (Munsan↔Majeong) 5 minute walk from Imjingak Resort
2. 909 (Munsan↔Seoul Station) Get off at Munsan Terminal → Transfer to #058 bus → Get off at Imjingak Resort. 5 minute walk
3. 9710 (Munsan↔Myeong-dong-ip-gu) Get off at Munsan Terminal → Transfer to #058 bus → Get off at Imjingak Resort. 5 minute walk

==== Car ====
Seoul Station → Yeonsinnae → Gupabal → Gwansan-dong → Munsan → Imjingak (last point of National Road No. 1) Jayuro → MunsanI.C → Imjingak
