= JNR Class 230 =

Japanese locomotive class

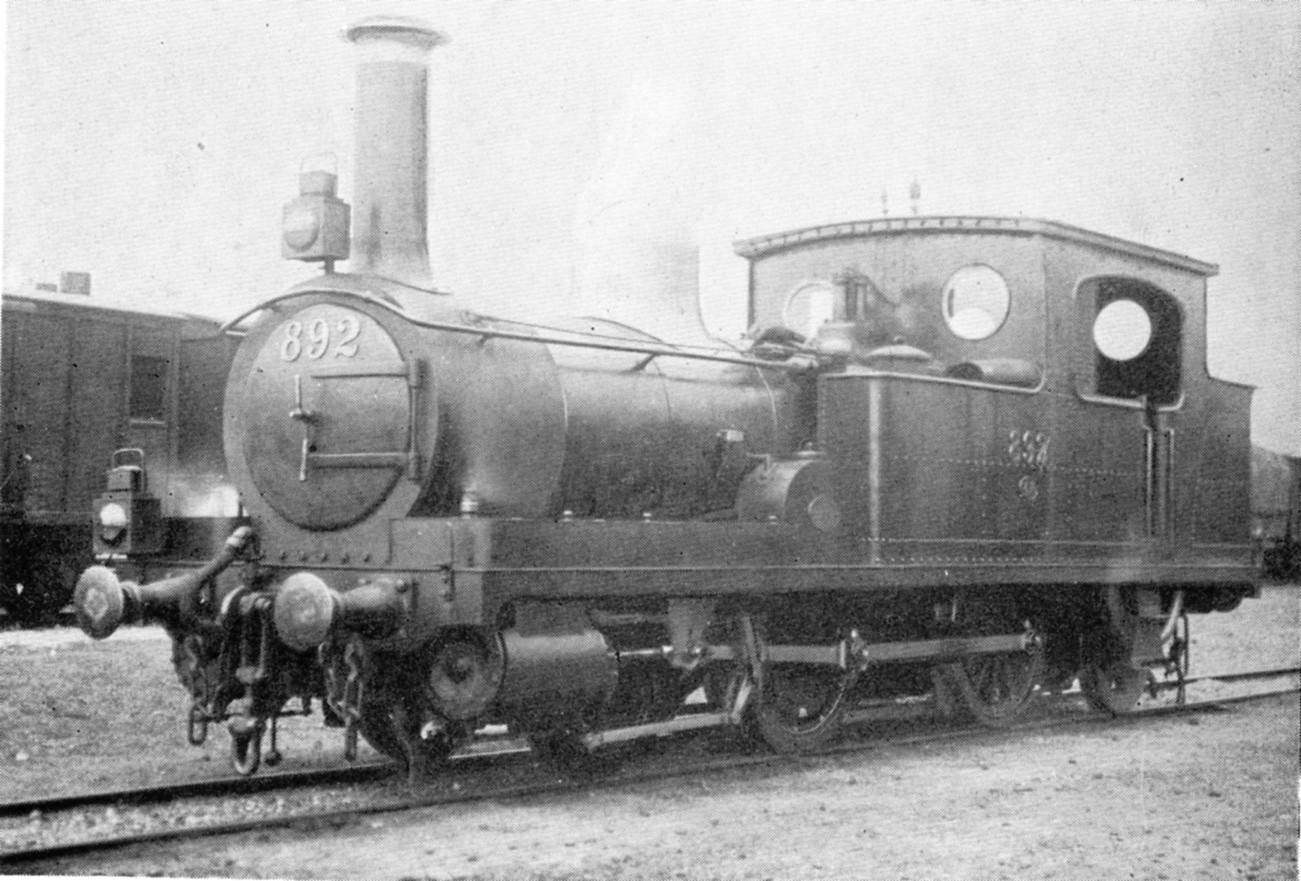
- One of the locomotives, shown in 1952
Type and origin
- Power type: Steam
- Builder: Osaka Kisha Seizo Kaisha (KSK)
- Build date: 1903-1909
- Total produced: 41
Specifications
- Configuration
  - AAR: 2-4-2T
- Gauge: 1,067 mm (3 ft 6 in)
- Driver dia.: 1245mm
- Loco weight: 35.88 t
- Firebox
  - Grate area: 1.11 m2
- Boiler pressure: 10.6 kgf/cm2
Career
- Delivered: 1903-1909
- Preserved: 3 (two in Japan, one in Taiwan), all static displays
- Scrapped: 1950s-1960s

The JNR Class 230 is a class of steam locomotive, built by Osaka Kisha Seizo Kaisha (KSK) between 1903-1909. These were the first mass-produced steam locomotives in Japan.

== History ==
The Class 230 were based on the Class A8 2-4-2 tank engines imported from the United Kingdom. The 230 series has a 2-4-2 arrangement. The series was in production from 1903-1909, with all units built Osaka Kisha Seizo Kaisha (KSK). Kisha Seizo was a large private vehicle manufacturing company, with some capital raised from the central government. The Class 230 would be their second locomotive product. The Class 230 were probably designed by Shogo Hasagawa, the mechanical engineer at the Omiya railway works of the Nippon Railway Co, assisted by Heijiro Kudo. Both came from the railway to work for Kisha Seizo. The first locomotive of the Class was built in 1903 and delivered to the government-run railway. By 1909, a total of 41 units had been built by the company; two were delivered to private railways, but later (in 1907) taken over by the government railways. It is believed that some parts were imported from the United Kingdom (in a semi-finished state), or machined using the large machine tools of the nearby Osaka Artillery Arsenal. They used technical details from the Class 860 locomotives to refine the new design. Though borrowing heavily from an imported British locomotive, the design was modified for local conditions, not simply copied from the imported model. The 41 Class 230 locomotives were assigned to operate in western Honshu, mainly in the Kyoto (Umejoki), Osaka, Fukui, Hiroshima and Tokushima engine sheds. The units were known for their reliability, with about half surviving until the end of World War II, after which they served as switchers until about 1950. The Class C11 and C12 locomotives were seen as the successors of the Class 230.

== Technical details ==
As an improvement over the Class 860, several changes were made. The Class 230 uses a single slidebar (for the crosshead) as compared to two on the 860. The diameter of the driving wheels was changed from 4ft-4in (1321mm )in the 860 to 4ft-1in (1245mm) for the 230 locomotives. The window height, handle positions and lever ratios in the locomotive cabin were modified “to suit Japanese physiques”. The two examples built for private railways differed slightly in the distance between the leading carrying wheels and the trailing wheels; the former 234in (5944mm) and the latter 232in (5893mm). Both types used Joy-type valve gears.

== Preservation and significance ==
Three examples of the type are known to exist. One example of the Class 230 (as of 2004) number 233 was on display at the West Japan Railway’s Modern Transportation Museum in Osaka. The unit was designated a Quasi Railway Memorial in 1986 by the Japan National Railway (JNR), and upgraded to a Railway Memorial in 2004 by the West Japan Railway Company. Another, number 268, is preserved as a static display on the east side of Tosu Station, Kyomachi, Tosu City, Saga Prefecture. That unit was designated as an Important Cultural Property of Tosu City (designated on June 13, 2005). It was displayed in front of Tosu City Hasll from 1970-2005. One very similar model is preserved at Department of Business Administration, National Cheng Kung University, Guangfu Campus, No. 1 University Road, Tainan City, Taiwan. After it was retired in 1954, it has been preserved at the University since 1958.

== See also ==
- Japan Railways locomotive numbering and classification
