= Vietnam Railways 230 Class =

Type of locomotive used in Vietnam

230 Class
Type and origin
- Power type: Steam
Specifications
- Configuration
  - Whyte: 4-6-0
  - UIC: 2'C
- Gauge: 1,000 mm (3 ft 3 3/8 in)
Career
- Operators: Vietnam Railways
- Preserved: 4

The 230 class locomotive are several 4-6-0 metre gauge steam locomotive classes in use on Vietnam Railways. Its class designation, 230, refers to their 4-6-0 wheel arrangements. (Note: The Vietnamese railways used the French wheel arrangement system for steam locomotives; which counts axles instead of wheels.)

Several sub-classes have been identified of the 230 class, including the 230-001, 230-301 and 230-401 types.

== Preserved examples ==
- 231-002: Battambang depot
- 231-003: Battambang depot
- 231-004: Battambang depot
- 231-406: Phnom Penh Works
