= Class 94 =

Class 94 may refer to:

- DRG or DR Class 94, a class of German tank locomotive with a 0-10-0 wheel arrangement operated by the Deutsche Reichsbahn and comprising:
  - Class 94.0: Palatine T 5
  - Class 94.1: Württemberg Tn
  - Class 94.2-4: Prussian T 16
  - Class 94.5-17: Prussian T 16.1
  - Class 94.19-21: Saxon XI HT
  - Class 94.67: various locomotives taken over in 1949 by the Deutsche Reichsbahn (GDR)
- KTM Class 94, a Malaysian electric multiple unit (EMU) train
