= HRCS2 =

Electric multiple unit

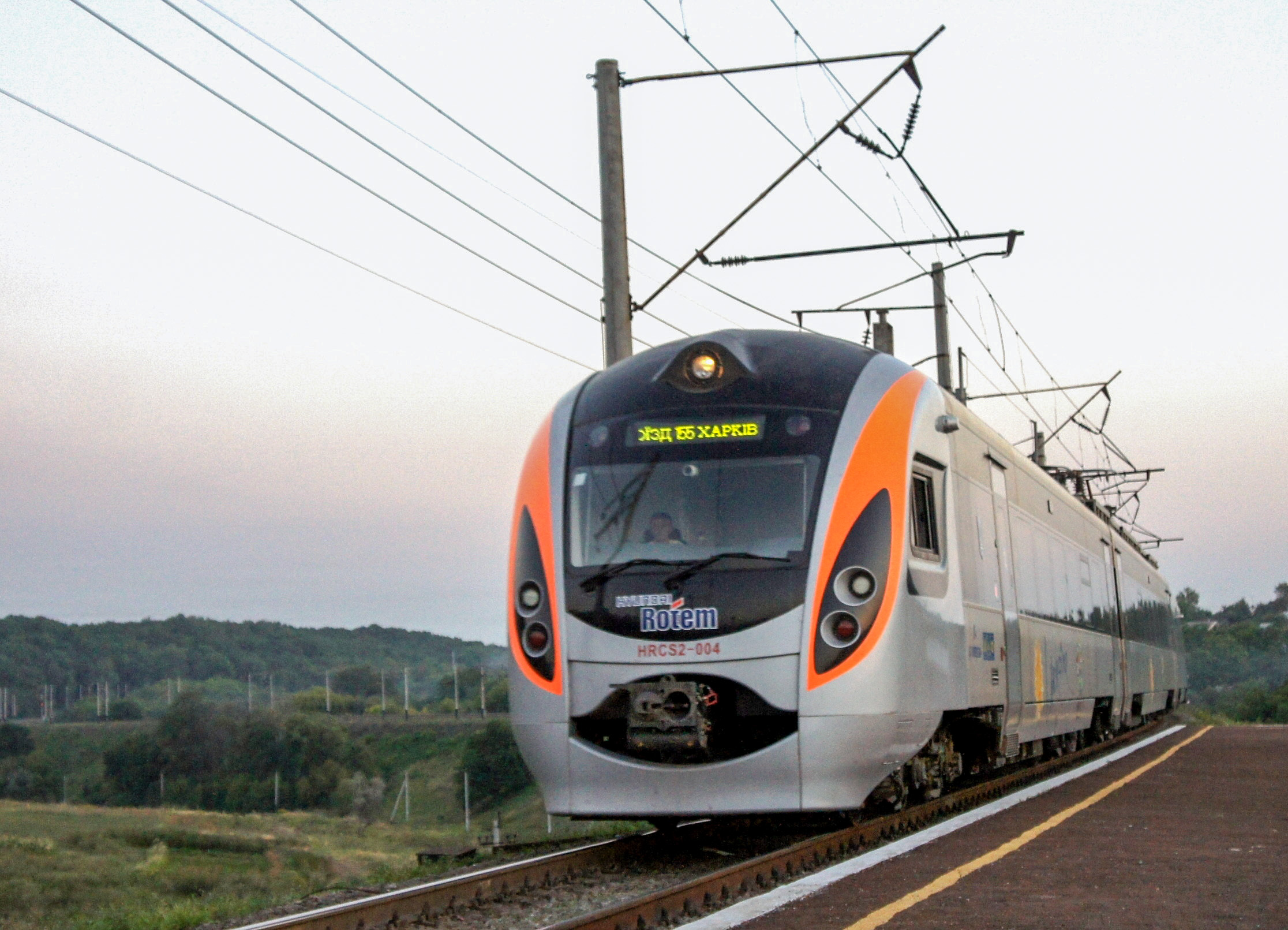
- Manufacturer: Hyundai Rotem
- Built at: Changwon, South Korea
- Family name: ICR
- Constructed: 2011 – 2012
- Entered service: 2012 – present
- Number built: 100 vehicles (10 sets)
- Number in service: 100 vehicles (10 sets)
- Formation: 9 cars per trainset
- Capacity: 1,162 passengers (579 seats)
- Operator: Ukrainian Railways

Specifications
- Car body construction: Stainless Steel
- Car length: 21.7 m (71 ft 2 in)
- Width: 3.5 m (11 ft 6 in)
- Height: 4.274 m (14 ft 0.3 in)
- Doors: Electric plug-in doors
- Maximum speed: 176 km/h (109 mph)
- Weight: 413.96 t (407.42 long tons; 456.31 short tons)
- Power supply: DC 3 kV & AC 25 kV
- Bogies: Bolsterless, out-board type
- Braking system: A Microprocessor based electro-pneumatic brake
- Track gauge: 1,520 mm (4 ft 11 27/32 in) Russian gauge

The HRCS2 Hyundai Rotem is a dual-voltage electric multiple unit built by Hyundai Rotem for the Ukrainian Railways.

== History ==
The trains were ordered by Ukrainian Railways in preparation for the football championship UEFA Euro 2012 to transport passengers between cities that would host sporting events. The contract included delivery of 10 multiple units for $307 million, and an option for four diesel trains for an additional $43 million. As one of the consequences of Russian and soviet rule the Ukrainian rail network has a track gauge 85mm wider than the standard gauge, which requires purpose-built rolling stock. The first two South Korean trains were delivered by ship to Odesa on March 11, 2012. Unit HRCS2-002 was taken into service at Odesa Zastava-1 and sent to Kharkiv on March 16 for acceptance testing, followed by Unit 001 on March 17. Units 003 and 004 arrived to Odesa on April 9, 2012, and were delivered to Kharkiv in April 2012, followed by units 005 and 006 in May. All six units passed their acceptance tests by June 1, 2012, and were employed during the Euro 2012 tournament. The remaining four trains arrived around August 2012.

Passenger service using Hyundai officially started on May 27, 2012, with Kyiv-Kharkiv and Kyiv-Lviv routes. The trains are used on a premium service introduced in Ukraine specifically for them, called Intercity and Intercity+ (Ukrainian: Інтерсіті+).

The trains had not undergone full-scale four-season tests, as is usually done in the railway industry. In December 2012 the trains were breaking down almost on a daily basis due to cold weather. This led to criticism by passengers and President of Ukraine Viktor Yanukovych that the trains were bought. Hyundai Rotem offered its apologies to Ukrainian passengers, citing its "first winter in the country". The company will have its own team of engineers in Ukraine till 2018. Early October 2013 the company guaranteed "continuous operation" of the Intercity+ trains in the coming autumn and winter. However, all trains were taken out of service on February 12, 2014. Service resumed with one train set on April 29, 2014. The modernization program was scheduled to be completed at the end of July 2014, and new service was added on August 22, 2014, between Darnytsia, Kyiv and Тернопіль (станція), Ternopil. As of August 23, 2015, all HRCS2 trains have Wi-Fi access on board.

On August 28, 2025, in a Russian air strike on Kyiv, one of trainsets, HRCS2-006 was damaged. The trainset suffered a direct hit of a drone. The Ukrainian Railways hope to repair it.

== Description ==
The HRCS2 is an electric multiple unit train designed to carry passengers on electrified lines with nominal voltages of 25 kV AC 50 Hz and 3 kV DC, running on track of 1,520 mm (4 ft 11 27/32 in) Russian gauge. In service, the trains reach speeds of 160 km/h.

Each trailer car uses two asymmetric collectors manufactured by LEKOV and has one main transformer; each transformer feeds traction power to the two adjacent cars.

Each motor car has four asynchronous traction motors with a rated power of 250 kW (connected as four parallel groups) that are powered by 4QS converter and inverter.

The train uses an air suspension system.

== Composition ==
The trainset is formed with two cab cars, three trailers, and four power cars under the scheme: CC+T+P+P+T+P+P+T+CC, a shorter six car variant is also possible. Two units can be connected together to form a single train. The trailer cars carry first class seats in a 2x2 arrangement, the power cars and cab cars carry second class in a 2+3 seats arrangement. The total capacity of a single trainset is 579 passengers.

== In-service use ==
The Electric Multiple Unit is operated on the Lviv, Southwestern, Southern, Donetsk, and Cisdnieper railways.

Trains ran daily on the following routes:

- Kyiv-Kharkiv
- Darnytsia-Kyiv-Lviv
- Kyiv-Lviv-Przemyśl Poland
- Darnytsia-Kyiv-Odesa
- Kyiv-Dnipro-Zaporizhzhia
- Kyiv-Dnipro-Pokrovsk
- Kyiv-Kostiantynivka

== Gallery ==
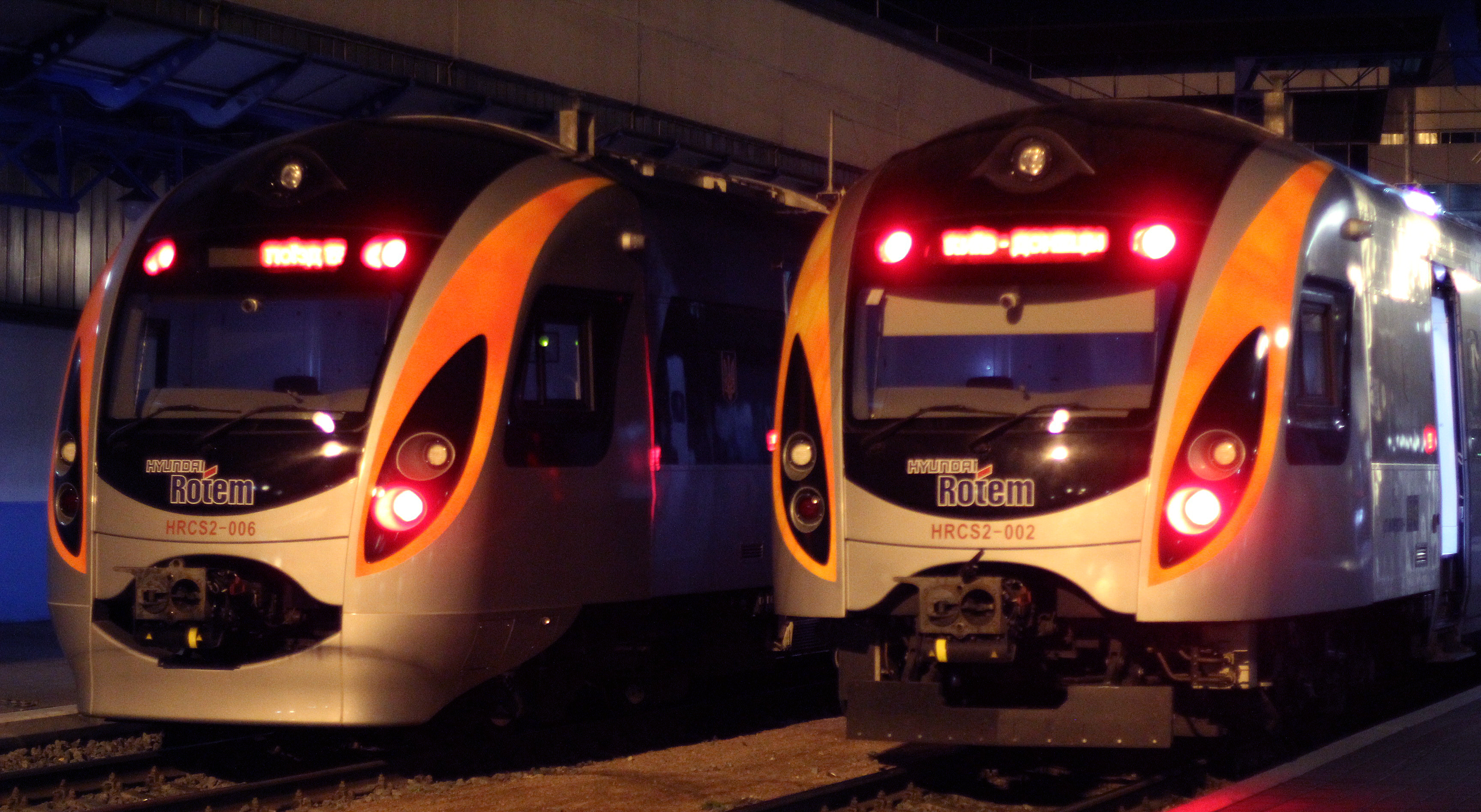

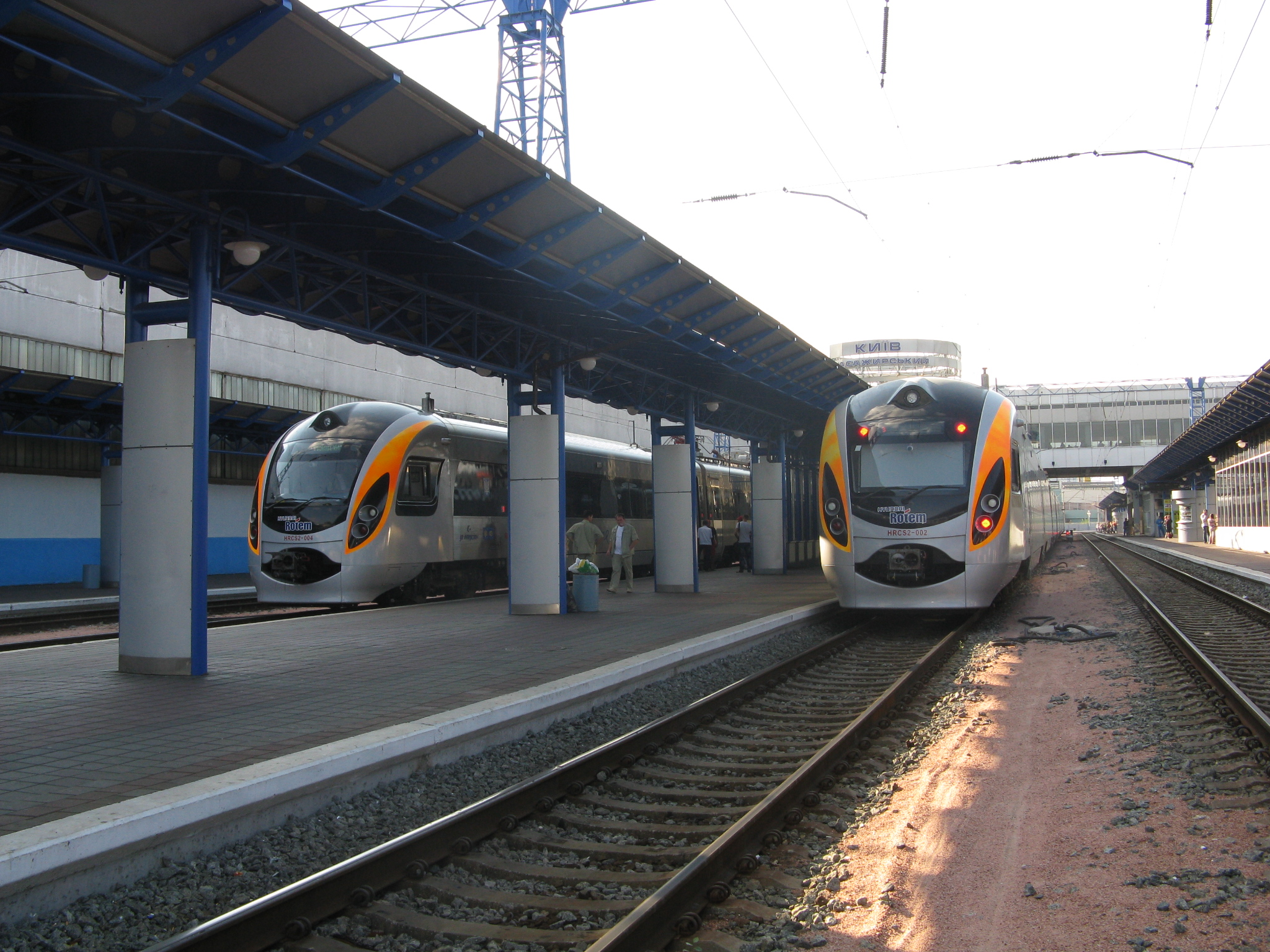

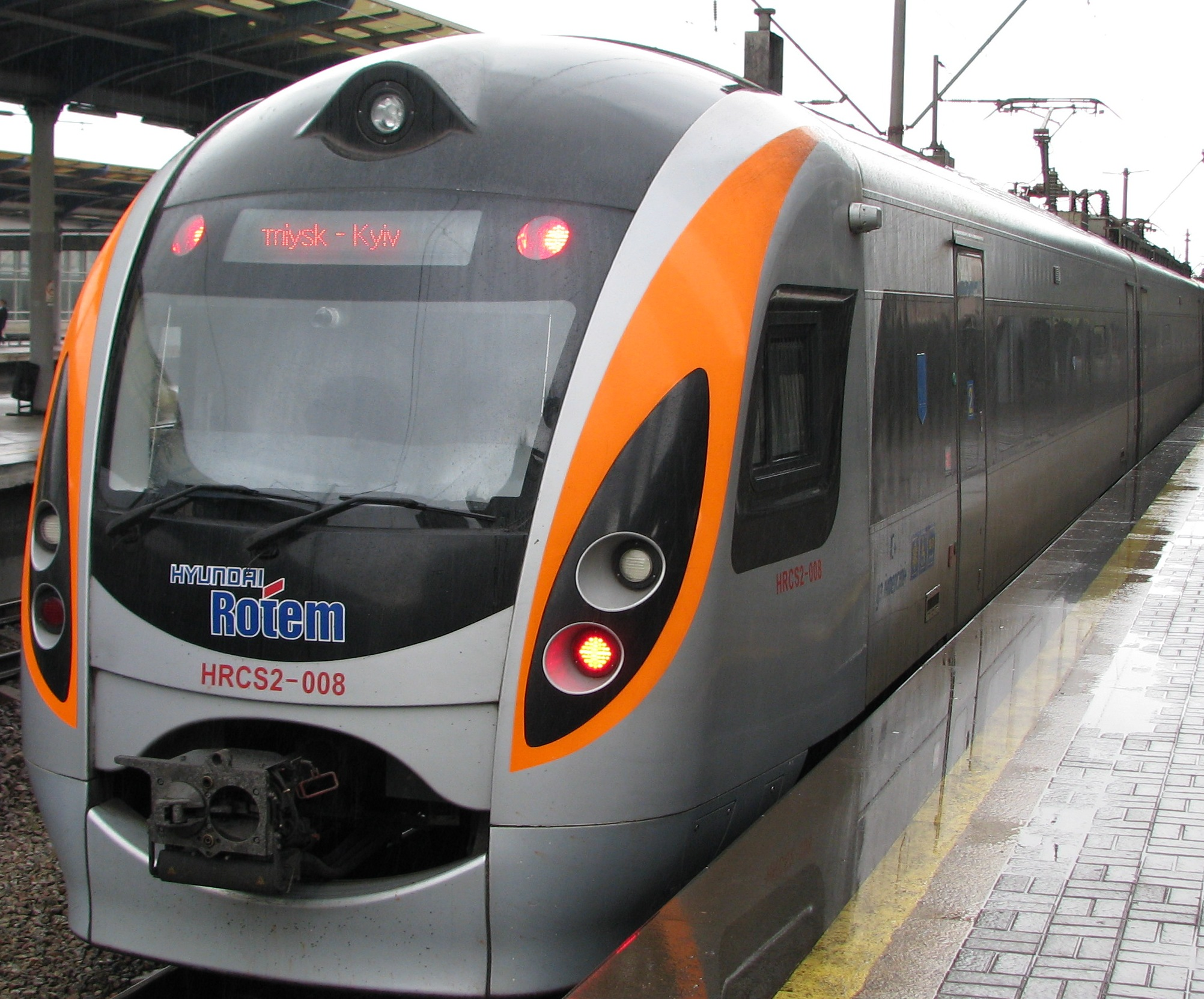

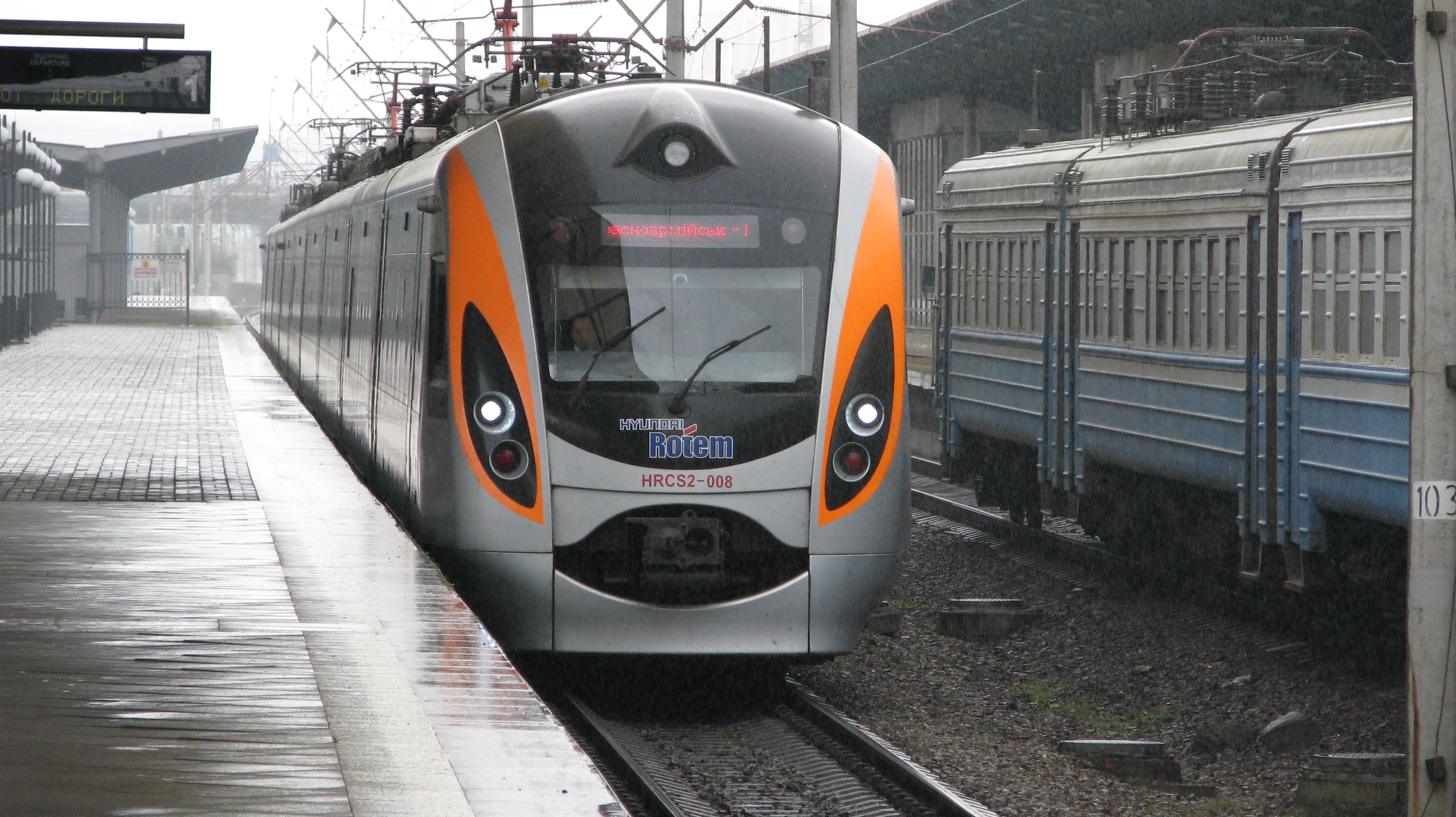

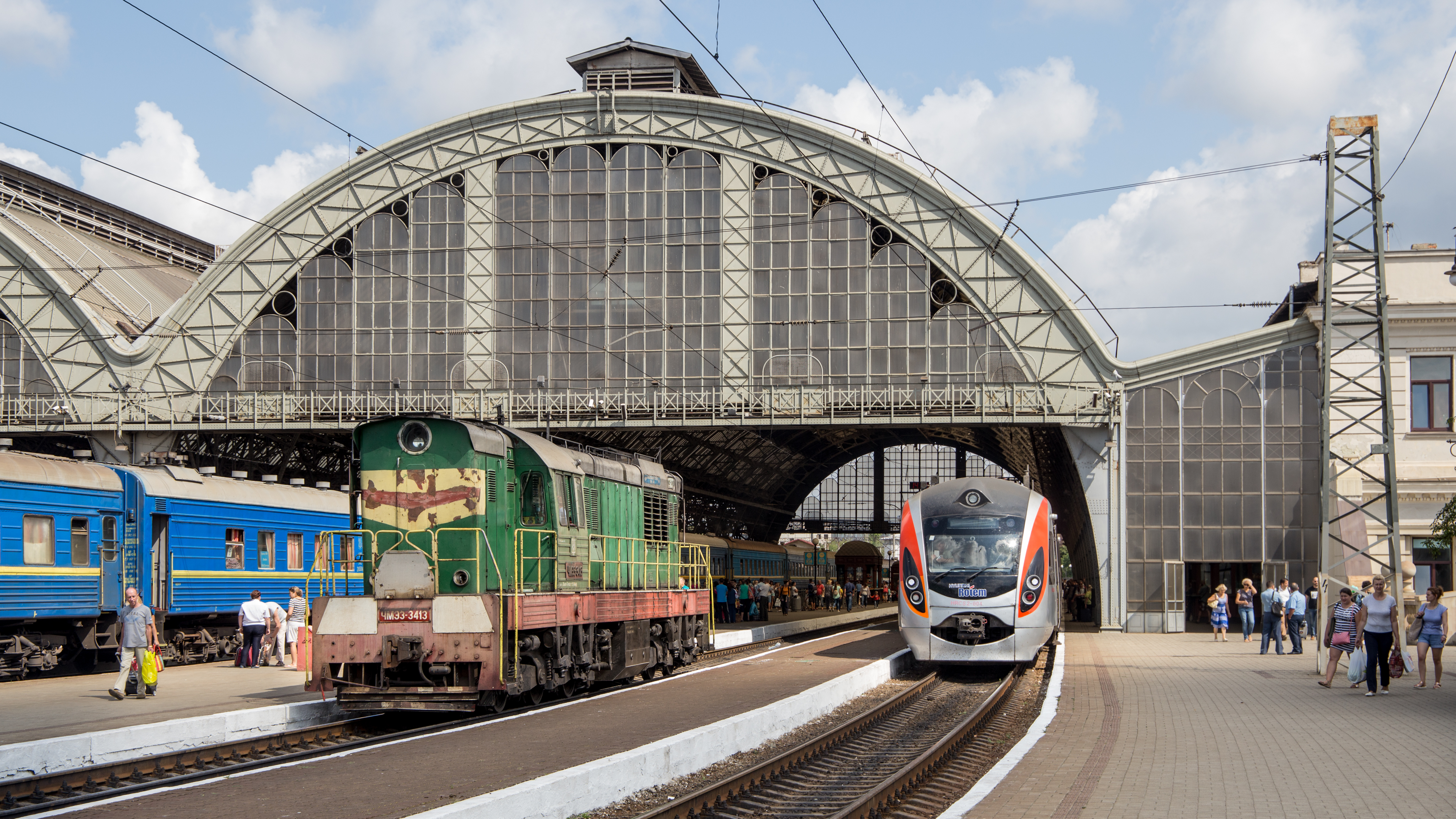

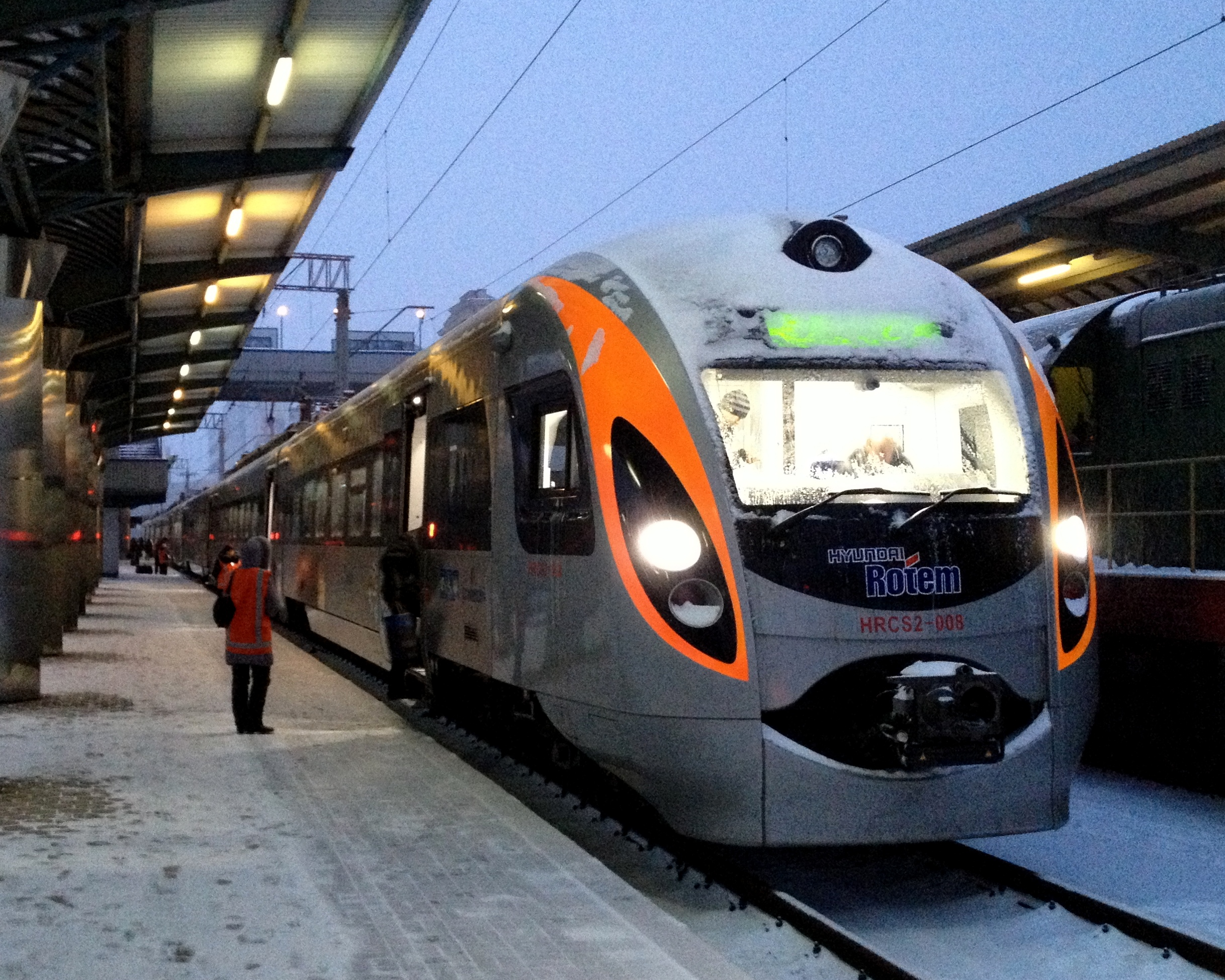

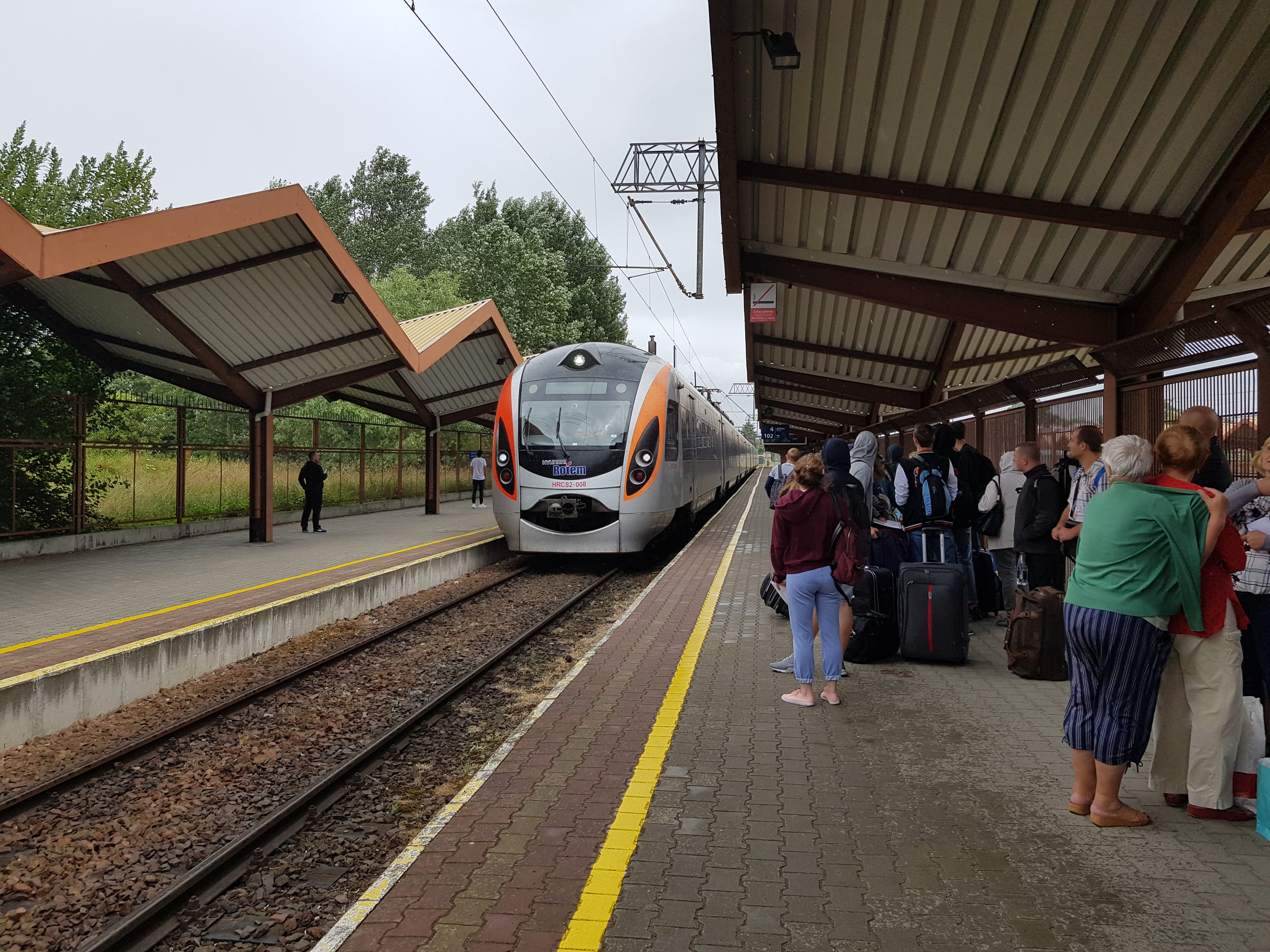

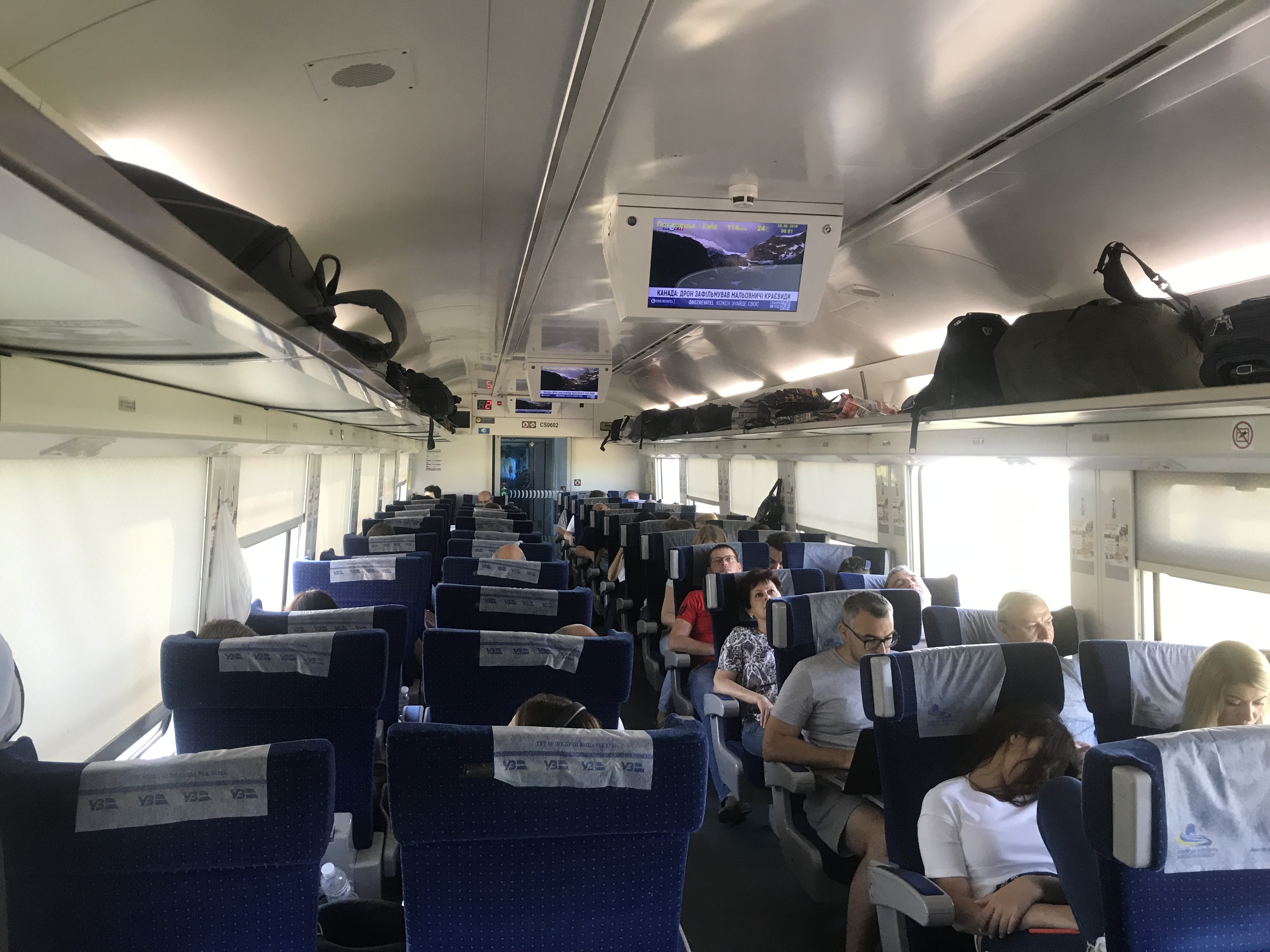

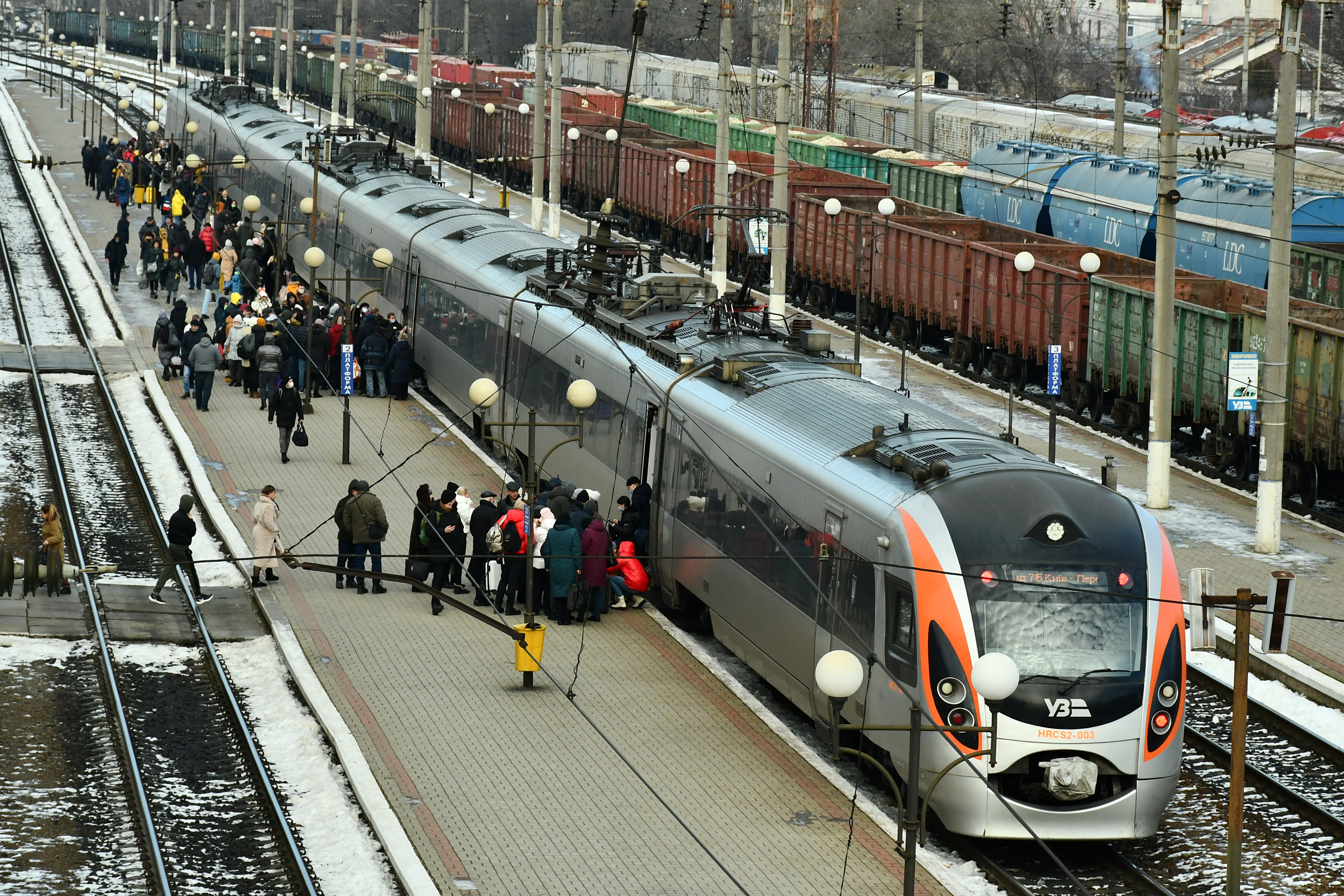

== See also ==
- IE 22000 Class
- KTM Class 91
