= KTM ETS =

Malaysian inter-city rail service

KTM ETS KTM Electric Train Service

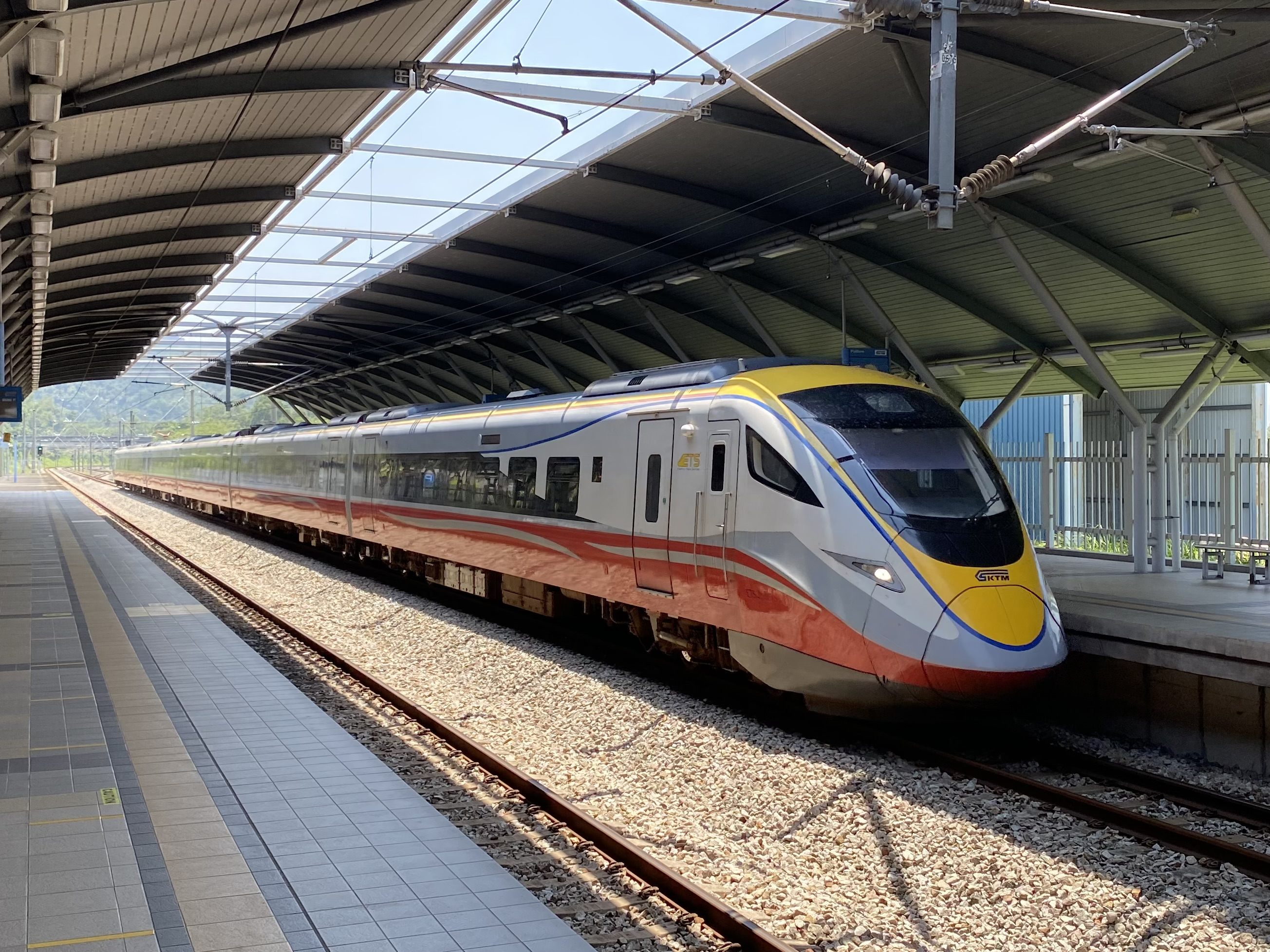
- A KTM Class 93 (Platinum service) arriving at Kampar

Overview
- Native name: Perkhidmatan Tren Elektrik (Malay) 电动列车服务 (Chinese) மின்சார ரயில் சேவை (Tamil)
- Owner: Keretapi Tanah Melayu (KTM)
- Locale: Padang Besar–Butterworth–Ipoh–Kuala Lumpur–Gemas–Johor Bahru
- Stations: 44 (as of 1 June 2026)
- Website: online.ktmb.com.my

Service
- Type: Inter-city rail - Higher-speed rail
- Operator: KTM Intercity Division
- Rolling stock: 5 six-car trainsets of KTM Class 91; 19 six-car trainsets of KTM Class 93; 10 six-car trainsets of KTM Class 94; Formation: Mc+Tp+M+M+Tp+Mc
- Daily ridership: 19,303 (Q4 2026)
- Ridership: 4.17 million (2025)

History
- Opened: 12 August 2010; 16 years ago

Technical
- Line length: 1,203.7 km (747.9 mi) (Padang Besar-Butterworth-Ipoh-KL Sentral-Gemas–JB Sentral)
- Track gauge: 1,000 mm (3 ft 3 3/8 in) metre gauge
- Electrification: 25 kV 50 Hz AC catenary
- Conduction system: With driver
- Operating speed: 135 to 140 km/h (80 to 90 mph)

The KTM ETS, commercially known as ETS (Electric Train Service), is an inter-city higher-speed rail service in Malaysia operated by Keretapi Tanah Melayu (KTM). It was introduced as the operator's second electrified train service after KTM Komuter, and represents Malaysia's second inter-city rail system after KTM Intercity.

Launched in 2010, the ETS is Malaysia's fastest metre-gauge train service. It operates on the historic KTM West Coast Line in western Peninsular Malaysia, which has since been largely electrified and double-tracked. Its maximum speed of 140 km/h (87 mph) is among the fastest for metre-gauge train services worldwide.

The service runs along the full extent of the West Coast Line, between Padang Besar near the border with Thailand and JB Sentral near the border with Singapore.

== History ==
=== First phase (August 2010 - July 2015) ===
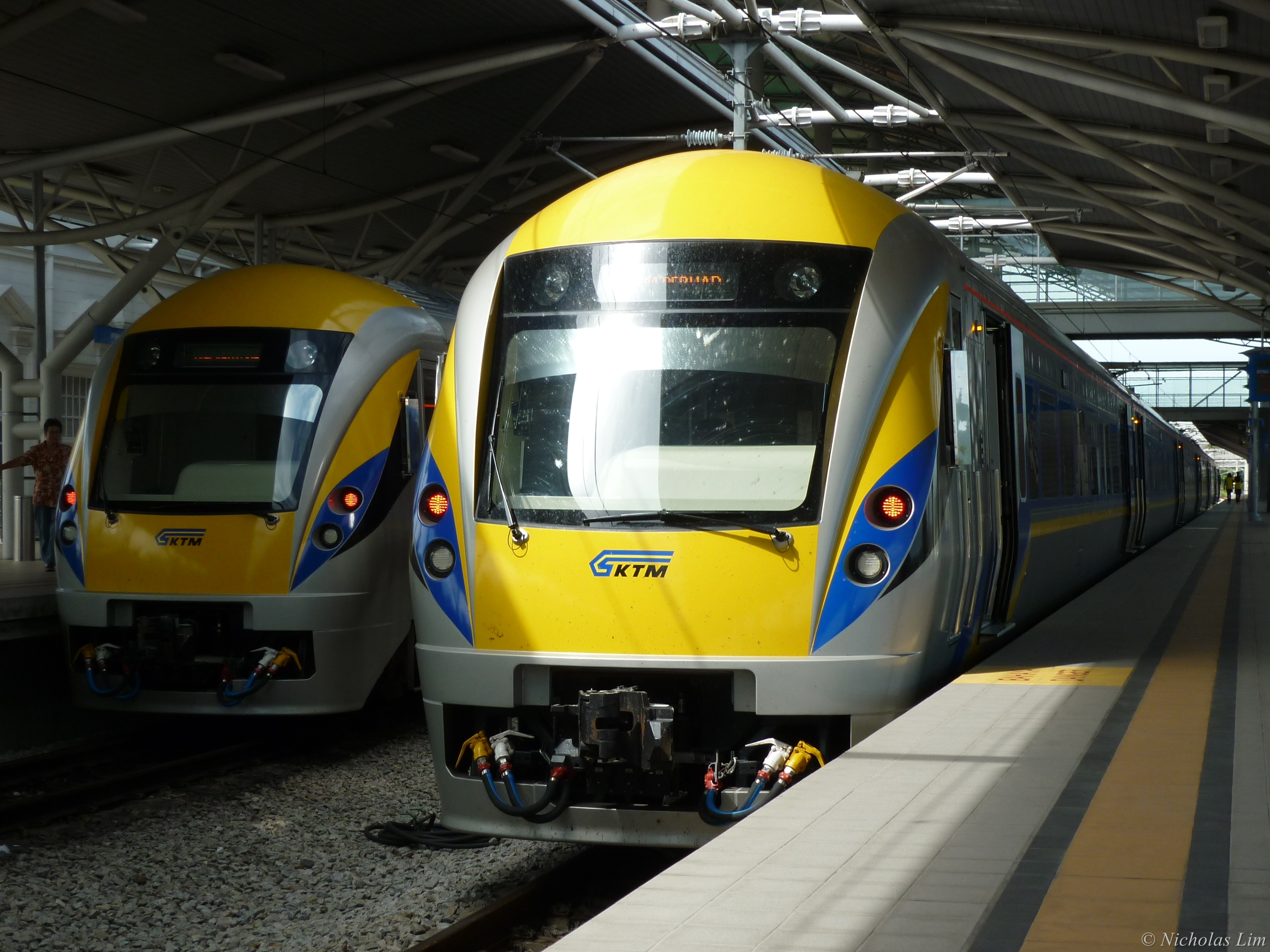
The original KTM Class 91 at Ipoh Railway Station, opened on the first phase.

The service was introduced by Keretapi Tanah Melayu (KTM) on 12 August 2010 between Ipoh and Seremban following the completion of the electrification and double-tracking of the Rawang to Ipoh stretch of the West Coast Line. Its inaugural run was celebrated with an opening ceremony at Kuala Lumpur railway station. Initially, services stretched southwards to Seremban, but the KL Sentral-Seremban sector was taken out of service in October 2012. At launch, there were three service types—Platinum, Gold, and Silver. On the fastest Platinum service, the trip was covered in two hours, one hour faster than by car. Gold and Silver services had more stops, hence taking up to 2 hours and 30 minutes. The route was served solely by 5 Class 91 electric trains.

=== Second phase (July–October 2015) ===
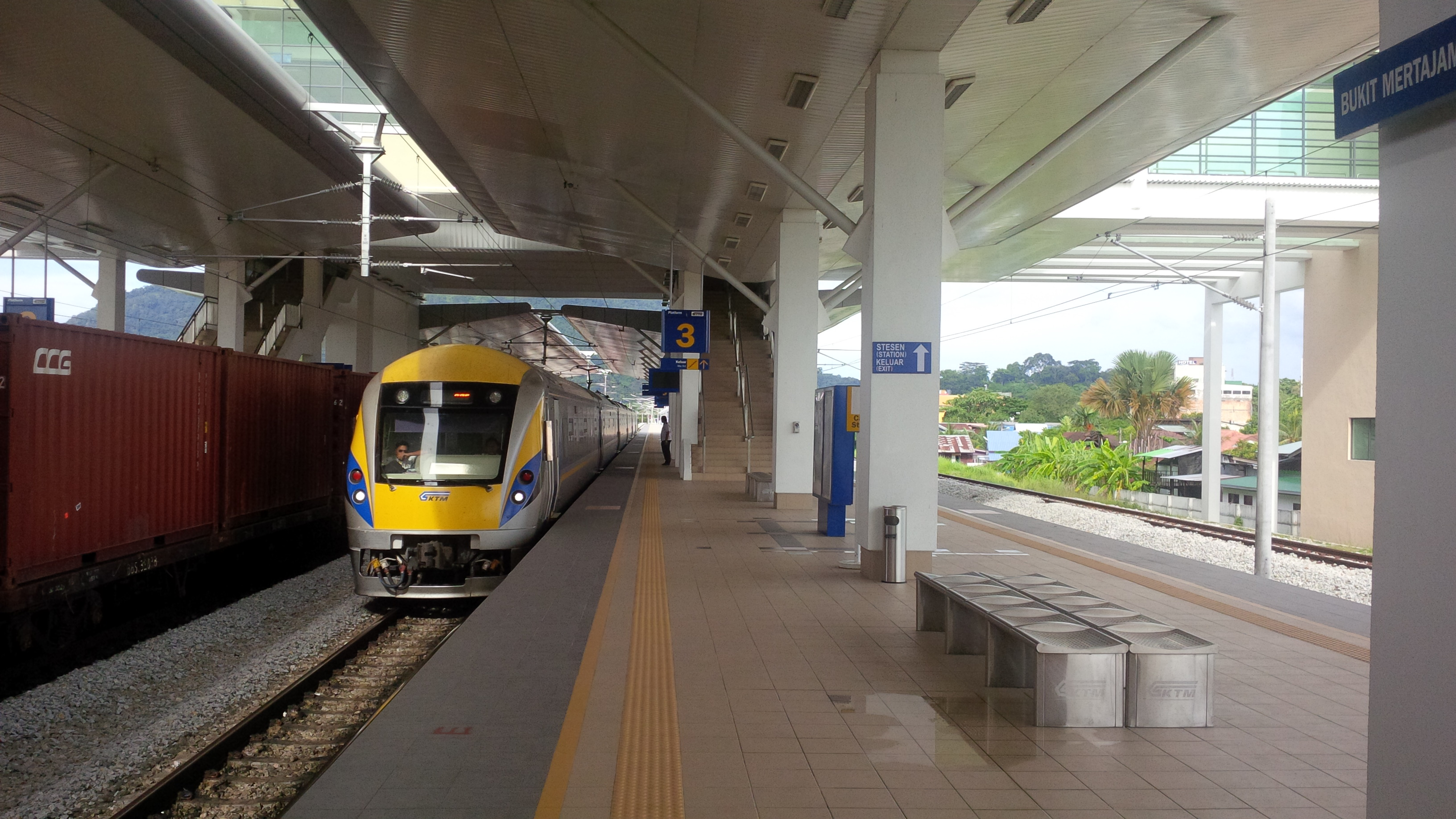
A Class 91 at Bukit Mertajam, opened on the second phase.

The service was extended from Ipoh to Padang Besar via Butterworth, the mainland town opposite George Town, with the introduction of the ETS Transit on 10 July 2015, with stops at 24 stations. At the inception of service, only one train service in both directions was introduced. This service was named the ETS Transit.

On the following day, 11 July 2015, a new service called the ETS Ekspres between KL Sentral and Padang Besar, via Butterworth was introduced, which only stops at 15 stations. Again, only one service for both directions was introduced. Subsequently, on 1 September 2015, an additional service between KL Sentral and Butterworth was introduced. New rolling stock, the Class 93 trains, were introduced in conjunction with the extended service.

=== Third phase (October 2015 - March 2025) ===
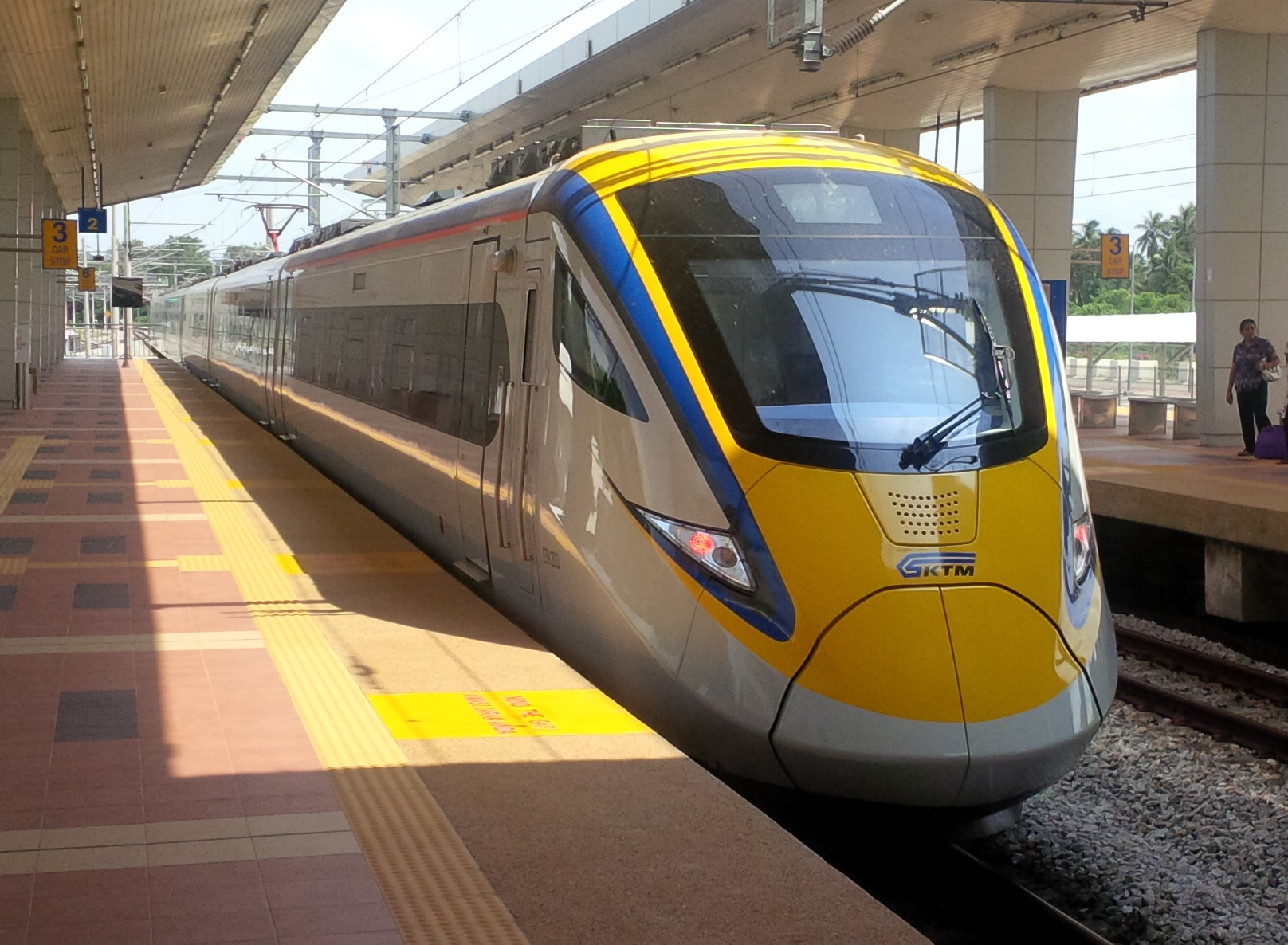
The KTM Class 93 ETS train No. 203 leaving Pulau Sebang/Tampin, opened on the third phase.

On 10 October 2015, the ETS service was extended southwards from KL Sentral to Gemas with the introduction of a new service between Padang Besar and Gemas. The extension of the KTM ETS service to Gemas utilizes the electrified double-track between Seremban and Gemas which was completed in 2014. This extension of service also saw the ETS service returning to Seremban after being discontinued in 2012.

On the same date, 10 October 2015, a new service was launched between Butterworth and Padang Besar in addition to existing services. However, this service was subsequently reduced in frequency and ultimately terminated with the introduction of the new KTM Komuter Northern Sector.

There were constant revisions of timetables and services as more trains became available, with more train services being added for each of the route segments. The Platinum, Gold, and Silver services were also reintroduced while the terms "ETS Ekspres" and "ETS Transit" were retired.

In 2020, due to traveling restrictions amid efforts to curb the COVID-19 pandemic, there were only two trips per day along the five then operational routes albeit with fewer Gold service trains. Services were restored as the pandemic situation improved.

On 1 August 2024, KTM reintroduced the ETS Express services consisting of three limited-stop daily services between KL Sentral and Ipoh, Butterworth and Padang Besar respectively, replacing former ETS Gold and ETS Platinum services on these routes. The new services reduced travel times to 2 hours between KL Sentral and Ipoh, 3 hours 35 minutes between KL Sentral and Butterworth and 4 hours 50 minutes between KL and Padang Besar. They were introduced after the completion of Phase 1 of the Klang Valley Double Track and Electrification (KVDT) Project.

=== Fourth phase (March 2025 - January 2026) ===
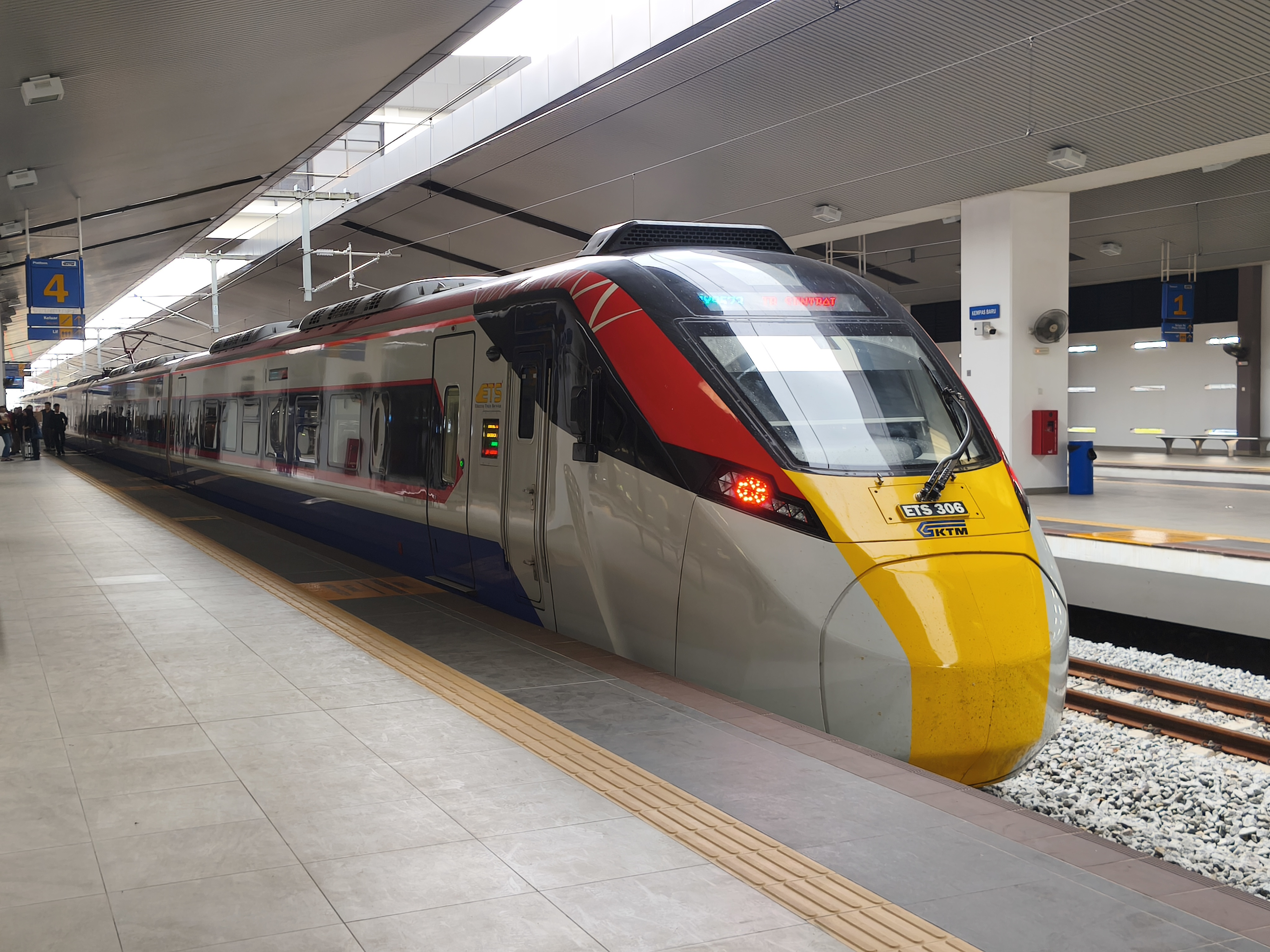
The KTM Class 94 ETS train No. 306 leaving Kempas Baru, opened on the fourth phase.

With the staggered completion of the Gemas-JB Electrified Double Tracking Project (EDTP), ETS services were extended southwards in stages throughout 2025 as portions of the line were completed. On 15 March 2025, the ETS was extended beyond Gemas station to the new Segamat station, which was rebuilt as part of the EDTP. On 30 August 2025, the ETS line was extended to Kluang station, with the introduction of a new ETS Platinum service between KL Sentral and Kluang. Between 10 October 2025 until 12 December 2025, KTM operated an additional weekend-only (every Friday, Saturday and Sunday) service between KL Sentral and Kluang, providing 2 return trips for those 3 days.

On 12 December 2025, the KL Sentral-Kluang route was extended to JB Sentral. This marks the completion of the electrification and double tracking of the main passenger trunk line on the KTM West Coast railway line between Peninsular Malaysia's northern and southern borders. The existing ETS Gold service from Padang Besar was extended from Segamat to JB Sentral on 1 January 2026, for the first time providing a complete direct north–south electric train service for Peninsular Malaysia. Since 24 February 2026, ETS Platinum services from Butterworth and Padang Besar to JB Sentral were introduced.

== List of stations ==
The following table lists the principal stations served by KTM ETS services along the electrified West Coast Line, arranged from north to south between Padang Besar and JB Sentral, reflecting the full extent of the intercity network across Peninsular Malaysia.

=== Padang Besar–JB Sentral via Ipoh, KL Sentral and Gemas ===
⇄ = cross-platform interchange ⇅ = connected interchange

Code	Name	Image	Cumulative distance (km)	Interchanges	Notes
PDR	Padang Besar		0.0	⇄ 2	Northern terminus. Connects to Thailand's Southern Line. Linkbridge access to the Padang Besar customs, immigration and quarantine (CIQ) complex. Northern terminus of the KTM Komuter Padang Besar–Butterworth Line.
ARU	Arau		29.4	⇄ 2	Serves Universiti Teknologi MARA's (UiTM) Arau Campus, Universiti Malaysia Perlis (UniMAP),Universiti Utara Malaysia (UUM), and Perlis Matriculation College
ABT	Anak Bukit		60.0	⇄ 2	Connects to Sultan Abdul Halim Airport.
ALS	Alor Setar		68.2	⇄ 2	
GRN	Gurun		103.1	⇄ 2	
SPT	Sungai Petani		124.5	⇄ 2	Serves UiTM's Merbok Campus
TGL	Tasek Gelugor		142.5	⇄ 2	
NTB	Nibong Tebal		179.1	⇄ 1	Serves Universiti Sains Malaysia's (USM) Engineering Campus
PBT	Parit Buntar		185.4	⇄ 1	
BGS	Bagan Serai		195.8	⇄ 1	
TPG	Taiping		239.4	⇄ 1	
KKS	Kuala Kangsar		267.6	⇄ 1	
SGS	Sungai Siput		288.8	⇄ 1	
IPH	Ipoh		326.1	⇄ 1	Southern terminus of the KTM Komuter Butterworth-Ipoh Line.
BTG	Batu Gajah		340.1		Serves as the ETS depot, together with the CRRC rolling stock centre.
KMR	Kampar		363.1		Serves Universiti Tunku Abdul Rahman's (UTAR) Kampar Campus.
TPH	Tapah Road		378.6		
SUI	Sungkai		402.6		
SLR	Slim River		426.8		
TJM KA15	Tanjung Malim		445.6	⇄ 2	Northern terminus of the KTM Komuter Tanjung Malim–Port Klang Line. Serves Sultan Idris Education University (UPSI).
BTK KA12	Batang Kali		480.8	⇄ 2	
RWG KA10	Rawang		500.6	⇄ 2	
SGB KA08	Sungai Buloh		514.9	⇄ 2 ⇅ 12	
KPS KA07	Kepong Sentral		520.7	⇄ 2 ⇅ 12	
KLO KA02	Kuala Lumpur		532.6	⇄ 1 2 ⇅ 5 9	
KLS KA01 KS01	Kuala Lumpur Sentral (KL Sentral)		533.6	⇄ 1 2 10 ⇅ 5 6 7 8 9	Eastern terminus of the KTM Komuter KL Sentral–Terminal Skypark Line
BTS KB04	Bandar Tasik Selatan		542.8	⇄ 1 ⇅ 4 7	Connects to Terminal Bersepadu Selatan (TBS) Bus Hub.
KJG KB06	Kajang		559.8	⇄ 1 ⇅ 9	
SRB KB13	Seremban		605.9	⇄ 1	Connects to Terminal 1 Shopping Centre Bus Terminal.
RBU KB16	Rembau		630.1	⇄ 1	ETS service starts on 1st January 2027
PST KB17	Pulau Sebang/Tampin		655.1	⇄ 1	Southern terminus of the KTM Komuter Batu Caves–Pulau Sebang Line.
BML	Batang Melaka		680.6		
GMS	Gemas		707.6	⇄	Interchange with East Coast Line towards Tumpat.
SGM	Segamat		733.6	⇄	Connects to Segamat Bus Terminal.
LBS	Labis		763.1		
BKK	Bekok		779.0		
PLH	Paloh		792.9	⇄ 1	Northern terminus of the KTM Komuter Paloh–JB Sentral Line.
KLG	Kluang		816.6	⇄ 1	
RGM	Rengam		835.3	⇄ 1	
LYG	Layang-Layang		848.2	⇄ 1	
KLI	Kulai		871.5	⇄ 1	Connects to Kulai Bus Terminal and Senai International Airport.
KPB	Kempas Baru		892.4	⇄ 1 2	Western terminus of the KTM Komuter Kempas Baru–Pasir Gudang Line. Serves Universiti Teknologi Malaysia's (UTM) Skudai Campus.
JBS	Johor Bahru Sentral (JB Sentral)		903.0	⇄ 1 ⇅ RTS	Southern terminus. Future linkbridge access to Bukit Chagar on the RTS Link to Singapore. Direct access to the Sultan Iskandar Building's customs, immigration and quarantine (CIQ) complex. Southern terminus of the KTM Komuter Paloh–JB Sentral Line.

=== Butterworth–JB Sentral via Ipoh, KL Sentral and Gemas ===
⇄ = cross-platform interchange

Code	Name	Image	Cumulative distance (km)	Interchanges	Notes
BTW	Butterworth		(145.1)	⇄ 1 2	Penang branch terminus. Connects to Penang Sentral and the Penang Ferry terminal. Future connecting station to LRT Mutiara Line. Western terminus of KTM Komuter Padang Besar-Butterworth Line and Butterworth-Ipoh Line.
BMT	Bukit Mertajam		(155.3)	⇄ 1 2	
continues southbound via Nibong Tebal

=== Subang Jaya–Butterworth & JB Sentral ===
⇄ = cross-platform interchange ⇅ = connected interchange

Code	Name	Image	Cumulative distance (km)	Interchanges	Notes
SBJ KD09 KS02	Subang Jaya			⇄ 2 10 ⇅ 5	ETS service starts on 1st January 2027

== Train services ==
=== Operations ===
KTM ETS services operate along the electrified and double-tracked West Coast Line, running between Padang Besar in the north and JB Sentral in the south. Services operate with multiple daily departures and are centred around key interchange stations such as KL Sentral, Ipoh and Butterworth.

Service patterns vary according to train category. ETS Platinum services operate as limited-stop express trains between major cities, while ETS Gold and Express services serve a wider range of intermediate stations. This tiered stopping pattern enables both long-distance intercity travel and regional connectivity.

Most services originate from KL Sentral, which functions as the primary operational hub of the network, providing interchange with KTM Komuter and other rail services. Trains operate bidirectionally throughout the day at speeds of up to approximately 140 km/h (87 mph), depending on route conditions.

=== Routes ===
latest ktm ets route map starting 2027

Odd-numbered train services denote southbound trains (towards KL Sentral, Segamat and JB Sentral), while even-numbered services denote northbound trains (towards Padang Besar, Butterworth, Ipoh and KL Sentral). Northbound and southbound services are typically paired as return journeys operating on a daily basis.

The following table summarises the principal ETS service patterns, including route coverage, service types, journey duration, stopping patterns and rolling stock assignment.

Train number	Route	Service type	Duration	Stops	Train trips	Class
EG9041, EG9044, EG9045, EG9049, EG9052, EG9055, EG9056, EG9058	KL Sentral–Ipoh	Gold	2h 34m	12	4	91 & 93/1
EX9008, EX9011	KL Sentral–Ipoh	Express	2h	4	1	91 & 93/1
EP9223, EP9224, EP9225, EP9226, EP9233, EP9238	KL Sentral–Padang Besar	Platinum	5h 21m	15	3	93/2 & 94
EX9209, EX9214	KL Sentral–Padang Besar	Express	4h 50m	9	1	93/2 & 94
EP9121, EP9123, EP9124, EP9130, EP9133, EP9135, EP9136, EP9138	KL Sentral–Butterworth	Platinum	4h 5m	12	4	93/2 & 94
EX9108, EX9109	KL Sentral–Butterworth	Express	3h 35m	6	1	93/2 & 94
EP9425, EP9428	Padang Besar–JB Sentral	Platinum	9h 36m	26	1	93/2 & 94
EG9442, EG9449	Padang Besar–JB Sentral	Gold	10h 18m	38	1	93/1
EG9343, EG9352	Butterworth–Segamat	Gold	7h 7m	24	1	93/1
EP9323, EP9326	Butterworth–JB Sentral	Platinum	8h 20m	22	1	93/2 & 94
EP9523, EP9524, EP9528, EP9530, EP9531, EP9532, EP9533, EP9535	KL Sentral–JB Sentral	Platinum	4h 20m	17	4	93/2 & 94

The service patterns are designed to balance express and all-stop operations, with Platinum, Gold and Express services differing in stopping frequency and journey time.

The ETS network operates along the electrified West Coast Line, forming the main north–south rail corridor of Peninsular Malaysia between Padang Besar near the Malaysia–Thailand border and JB Sentral near the Malaysia–Singapore border. Major intermediate hubs include Butterworth and KL Sentral, with most long-distance services originating from Kuala Lumpur.

The ETS operates seven routes, namely:

- KL Sentral - Ipoh
- KL Sentral - Butterworth via Ipoh
- KL Sentral - Padang Besar via Ipoh
- JB Sentral - Padang Besar via Gemas, KL Sentral and Ipoh
- Segamat - Butterworth via Gemas, KL Sentral and Ipoh
- JB Sentral - Butterworth via Gemas, KL Sentral and Ipoh
- JB Sentral - KL Sentral via Gemas

Currently, there are five return trips each on the KL Sentral - Ipoh and KL Sentral - Butterworth routes, four return trips each on the KL Sentral - Padang Besar and KL Sentral - JB Sentral routes, two return trips on the JB Sentral - Padang Besar routes, and one return trip each on the JB Sentral - Butterworth and Segamat - Butterworth routes daily. In addition to these trips, there are several additional trips on some of the respective routes during school holidays or major religious holidays.

=== Services ===
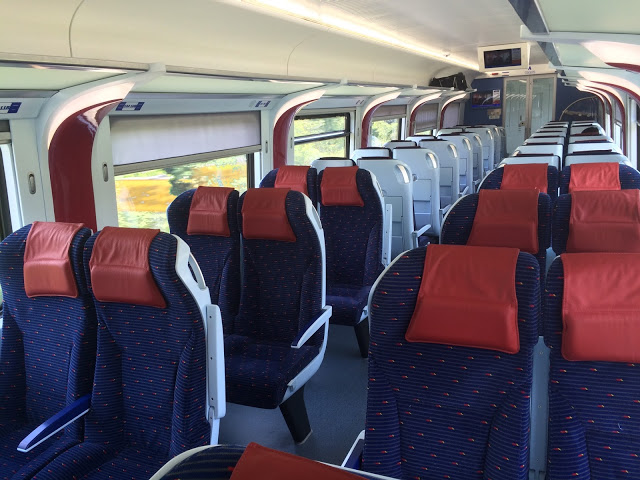
Interior of the standard class accommodation on KTM Class 93/1.

The train services are operated in four categories:

- Express service with fewer limited stops (3 return trips), along with business class coach service
- Platinum service with limited stops (13 return trips), along with business class coach service
- Gold service with selected stops (6 return trips)
- Silver service with stops at all stations (Terminated temporarily as of 1 January 2026)

==== Standard class ====
The seats on all trains are arranged in a 2+2 configuration, with each seat featuring a tray table and a power outlet. Cluster seats with fixed tables are available on the Class 93 and Class 94 trains. The seats can be easily converted for wheelchair use if necessary. The latest Class 94 trains seats can be rotated to face any direction. Each coach is equipped with LCD TV screens for entertainment, and toilets are available in every coach. The Class 93/2 and Class 94 trains include changing tables for infants. For Muslim passengers, a prayer room is available on every train. There is also a bistro coach that sells drinks, light snacks, and microwaved meals. This class is available on all trains and is the only class available on older trains such as the Class 91 and Class 93/1.

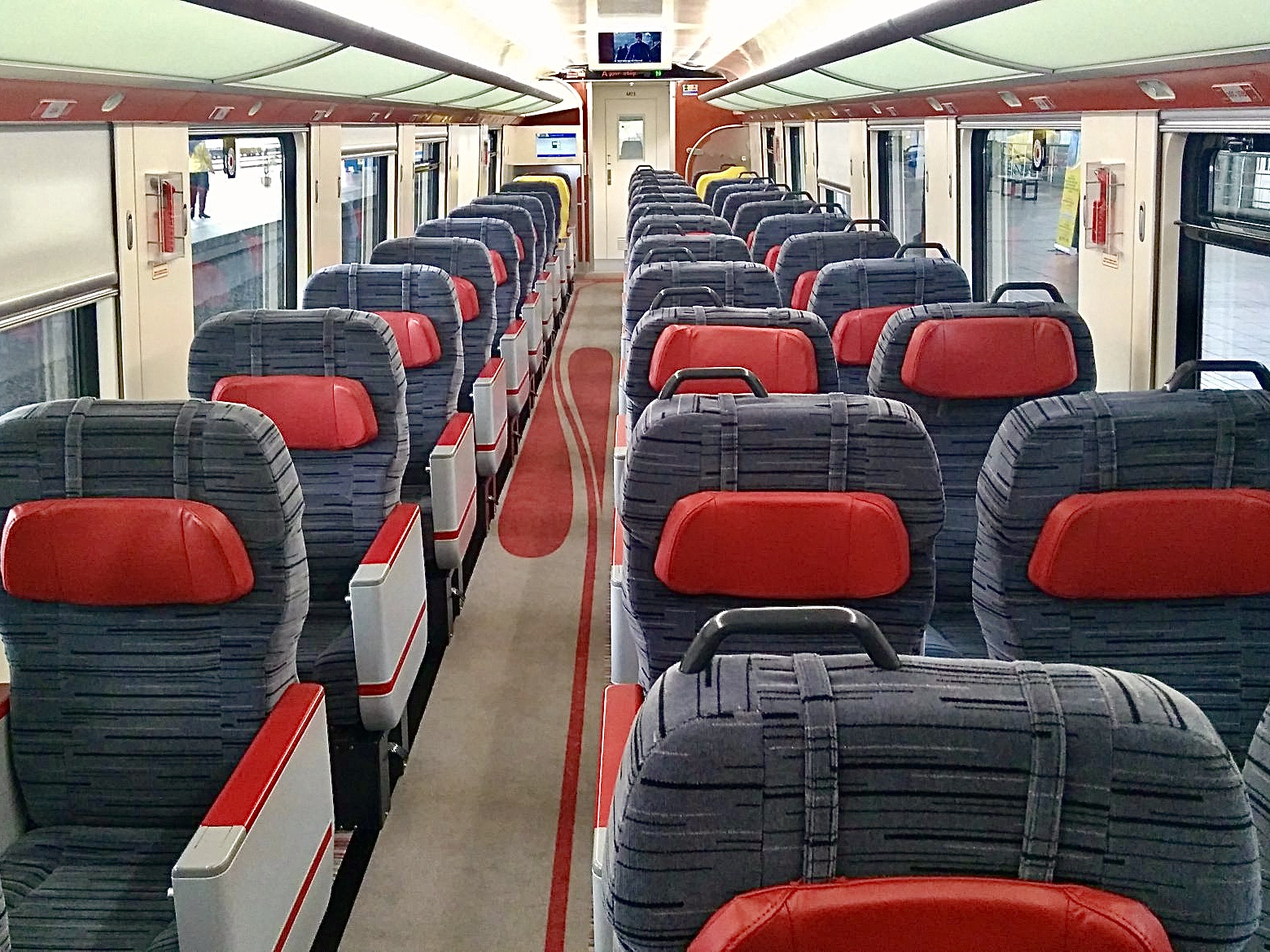
Business Class interior.

==== Business Class ====
The Business Class service offers an upgrade from the Standard Class, providing several enhanced features not available in Standard Class. The seats are arranged in a 2+1 configuration, offering greater width and the ability to recline up to 45 degrees. They can also be rotated to face any direction. Each seat is equipped with both a power outlet and a USB port, as well as an on-demand video screen for in-train entertainment. Complimentary Wi-Fi is available for Business Class passengers. Each coach is staffed with a steward or stewardess who can be summoned from the seats. On-board dining is included in the fare, and passengers are provided with an amenity kit. This service is exclusively available on newer trains such as the Class 93/2 and Class 94 trains.

=== Former routes and services ===
Route	Service type	Duration	Stops	Train trips	Class	Fate
KL Sentral–Ipoh	Silver	2h 50m	14	1	91 & 93/1	Terminated on 1 January 2026, replaced with an additional ETS Gold service

=== Fares and ticketing ===
The KTM ETS utilises a reservation-based ticketing system in which fares are determined prior to travel based on distance, service type and passenger category. Tickets are issued for specific trains with assigned seating and fixed departure times, and may be purchased through the KTMB Integrated Ticketing System (KITS), mobile application, ticket counters and authorised sales channels.

All ETS tickets require prior seat reservation, and passengers are assigned specific seats at the time of booking. Tickets are typically released for sale in advance, with availability depending on travel periods and operational considerations.

Fares vary according to service category—ETS Platinum, ETS Gold and ETS Silver—with faster services generally commanding higher fares due to reduced stops and shorter journey times. Unlike urban rapid transit systems, ETS does not employ a stored-value or distance-based tap-in/tap-out fare mechanism; instead, passengers are issued single-journey tickets calculated at the point of purchase.

Tickets are typically provided in digital format and incorporate QR codes for validation during boarding.

KTMB has also introduced an integrated ticketing arrangement with Express Rail Link (ERL), enabling passengers to purchase tickets for ETS (and KTM Intercity) services together with ERL services (KLIA Ekspres or KLIA Transit) within a single transaction. The integrated ticketing arrangement was introduced to improve connectivity between intercity rail services and Kuala Lumpur International Airport.

Despite this arrangement, integration is limited to the booking process. Separate tickets are issued for each operator, and passengers are required to validate each journey segment individually using their respective QR codes. Fare structures remain independent between KTMB and ERL, and the system does not provide a single continuous fare calculation across both networks.

Tickets are valid only for the specified train and departure time for ETS services, while ERL tickets purchased under the integrated arrangement are subject to the respective operator's terms and validity conditions.

=== Onboard services ===
KTM ETS trains provide a range of onboard facilities designed for intercity travel, with seating configurations and amenities varying by service class and rolling stock. Standard class seating is arranged in an airline-style configuration with forward-facing seats and basic onboard conveniences.

Onboard amenities typically include air-conditioned coaches, overhead luggage storage, CCTV surveillance, unisex and accessible toilets, as well as designated seating areas for passengers with reduced mobility. Trains are also equipped with power outlets at passenger seats, onboard information displays, and prayer facilities.

All ETS services include a bistro or café coach offering light meals and beverages for purchase during the journey. Higher-tier services operating with newer trainsets may include enhanced onboard features such as business class seating with increased space, onboard entertainment systems, and meal services.

In addition to onboard facilities, KTM ETS provides selected station-based amenities for premium passengers, including access to dedicated waiting lounges such as the ETS Business Class Ruby Lounge at KL Sentral and Butterworth.

== Ridership ==
Ridership levels typically increase during major festive travel periods in Malaysia. During the Hari Raya Aidilfitri travel period from 17 to 29 March 2026, Keretapi Tanah Melayu Berhad (KTMB) recorded 292,033 ETS passengers, representing a 109 per cent increase compared to the previous year.

KTM ETS Ridership
Year	Ridership	Revenue (MYR)	Remarks
2026	5,325,231	N/A	As of October 2026
2025	4,165,063	N/A	Highest on record
2024	4,144,362	N/A	
2023	4,115,242	N/A	
2022	3,337,781	N/A	
2021	633,652	N/A	Travel restrictions due to COVID-19 pandemic, services reduced
2020	1,646,513	N/A	Travel restrictions due to COVID-19 pandemic, services reduced
2019	3,901,858	N/A	
2018	3,933,093	N/A	
2017	4,147,634	174,433,140	
2016	3,564,879	145,521,561	
2015	2,059,828	60,314,988	
2014	1,693,000	44,328,039	
2013	1,563,000	40,621,860	
2012	1,180,000	31,885,949	
2011	913,000	24,313,451	
2010	215,000	5,569,532	Operations began in August

== Rolling stock ==
The KTM ETS fleet consists of multiple classes of electric multiple units (EMUs) introduced in stages to support the expansion of higher-speed intercity rail services. These trainsets are designed for operation on the electrified metre-gauge network, and differ in terms of generation, onboard features and deployment across service sectors.

Earlier trainsets such as the KTM Class 91 and KTM Class 93 were deployed for initial and expanded ETS operations in the northern and central sectors, while newer KTM Class 94 trainsets (ETS3) were introduced for extended services, including the southern corridor to Johor Bahru.

Class	Image	Cars per Set	In service	On order	Manufacturer
KTM Class 91		6	5	-	Hyundai Rotem
KTM Class 93		6	19	-	CRRC Zhuzhou (formerly CSR Zhuzhou)
KTM Class 94		6	10	-	CRRC Zhuzhou

All ETS trainsets are configured as six-car units and are capable of operating at speeds of up to 140 km/h (87 mph) under commercial service conditions.

=== First generation ===
Five KTM Class 91 train sets, each comprising six cars, were purchased by KTM for US$67 million. The train sets were designed by the Marubeni Corporation and jointly built by Hyundai Rotem of South Korea and Mitsubishi Electric of Japan. The maximum operational speed of the ETS fleet is 140 km/h (87 mph), but the trains are designed to travel up to 160 km/h (99 mph). The total length of each train set is 138 meters, and it weighs 231.8 tons. Each carriage is 22.95 meters long, 2.75 meters wide, and 4 meters high. Each train set has a passenger seating capacity of 350 and includes on-board facilities such as toilets, a buffet car, power sockets for every two seats, and two LED televisions per car.

=== Second generation ===
Nineteen sets of KTM Class 93 trains were ordered in two batches to expand the fleet as the electrified network expanded. All 19 trains have been in service since October 2019.

The rolling stock was initially intended to be operational for the launch of the ETS Express service between KL Sentral and Padang Besar and the ETS Transit service between Ipoh and Padang Besar. However, issues during the testing and commissioning phase of the train sets led to the Malaysian land public transport authority, SPAD, not approving the trains for use in time for the launch of the two services on 10 July 2015 and 11 July 2015. Consequently, two KTM Class 91 train sets were used temporarily—one for the ETS Express and the other for the ETS Transit—allowing for just one trip in each direction for both services.

The first four KTM Class 93 sets went into service on 10 October 2015, and all sets from the first batch have since entered service.

The second batch of KTM Class 93 trains differs slightly from the first, featuring a redesigned livery and a business class coach, a first for ETS services. These coaches, named Class 93/2, started operations with the launch of the new ETS Business Class in October 2019.

=== Third generation ===
A batch of 10 Class 94 trains was tendered in May 2020 in light of the completion of the Gemas-JB Sentral Electrified Double Track Project (EDTP). The tender was awarded to CRRC Zhuzhou Locomotive, with 8 out of 10 sets being manufactured in Malaysia. The first set was completed on 8 June 2024 and began operations in August 2025 when the ETS was extended to Kluang.

== Performance and comparison ==
The ETS trains operate at speeds of up to 140 km/h (87 mph) on the electrified metre gauge rail network. The service is classified as a higher-speed rail (HrSR) limited express rather than true high-speed rail.

The ETS operates along a continuous electrified corridor linking Padang Besar near the Malaysia–Thailand border with JB Sentral near the Malaysia–Singapore border. The southern extension includes the 192 km (119 mi) Gemas–Johor Bahru section completed in 2025, forming a continuous north–south railway across Peninsular Malaysia.

This long-distance operation, spanning the full length of the peninsula, places the ETS among the more extensive and higher-speed metre gauge railway services currently in operation worldwide. Comparable higher-speed narrow gauge services include limited express operations such as the Kuroshio and Sonic in Japan, the Taroko Express and Puyuma Express in Taiwan, the Electric Tilt Train in Australia, and regional metre gauge services such as Euskotren Trena in Spain.

== Gallery ==
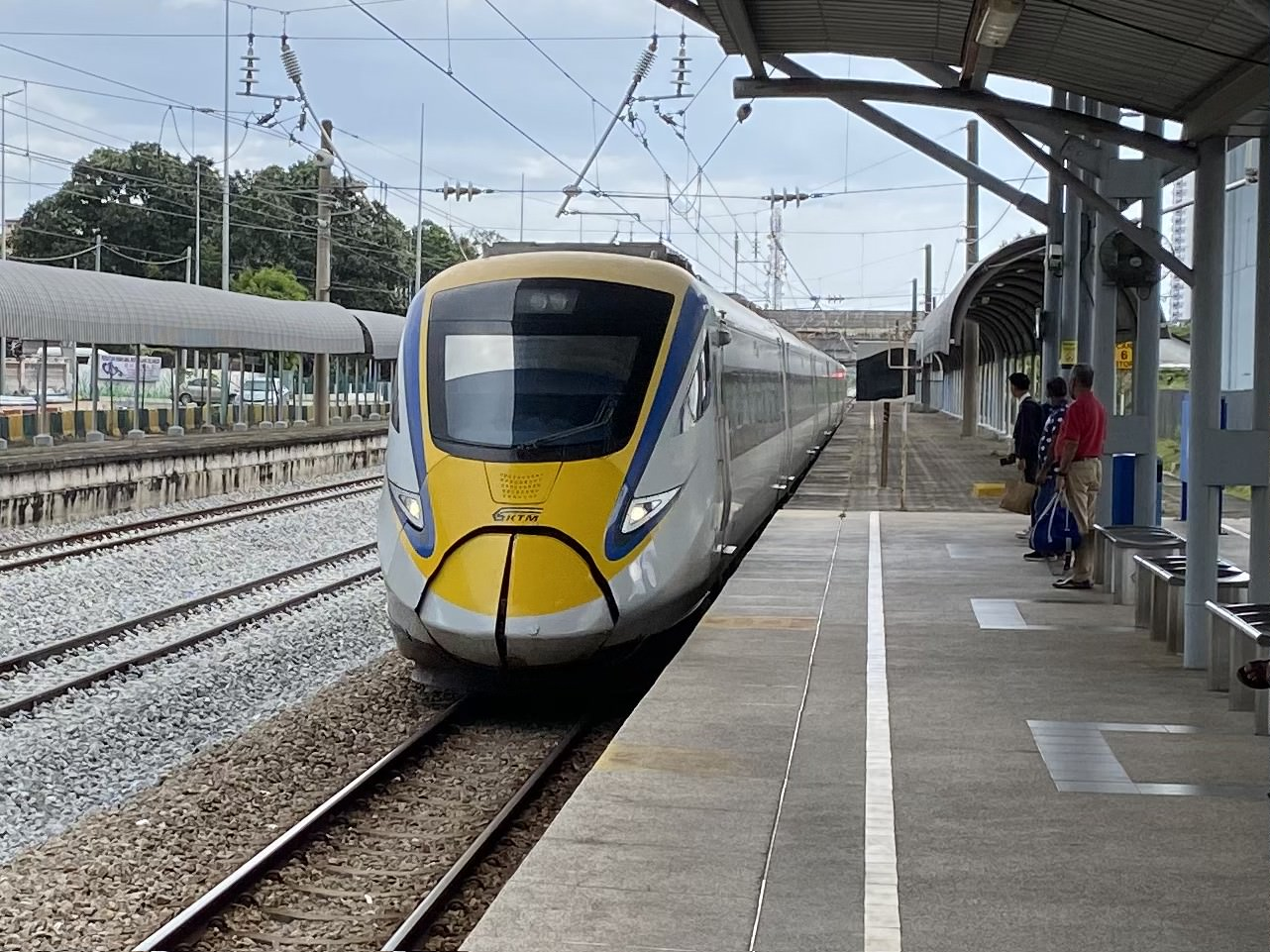
Class 93 entering Kajang

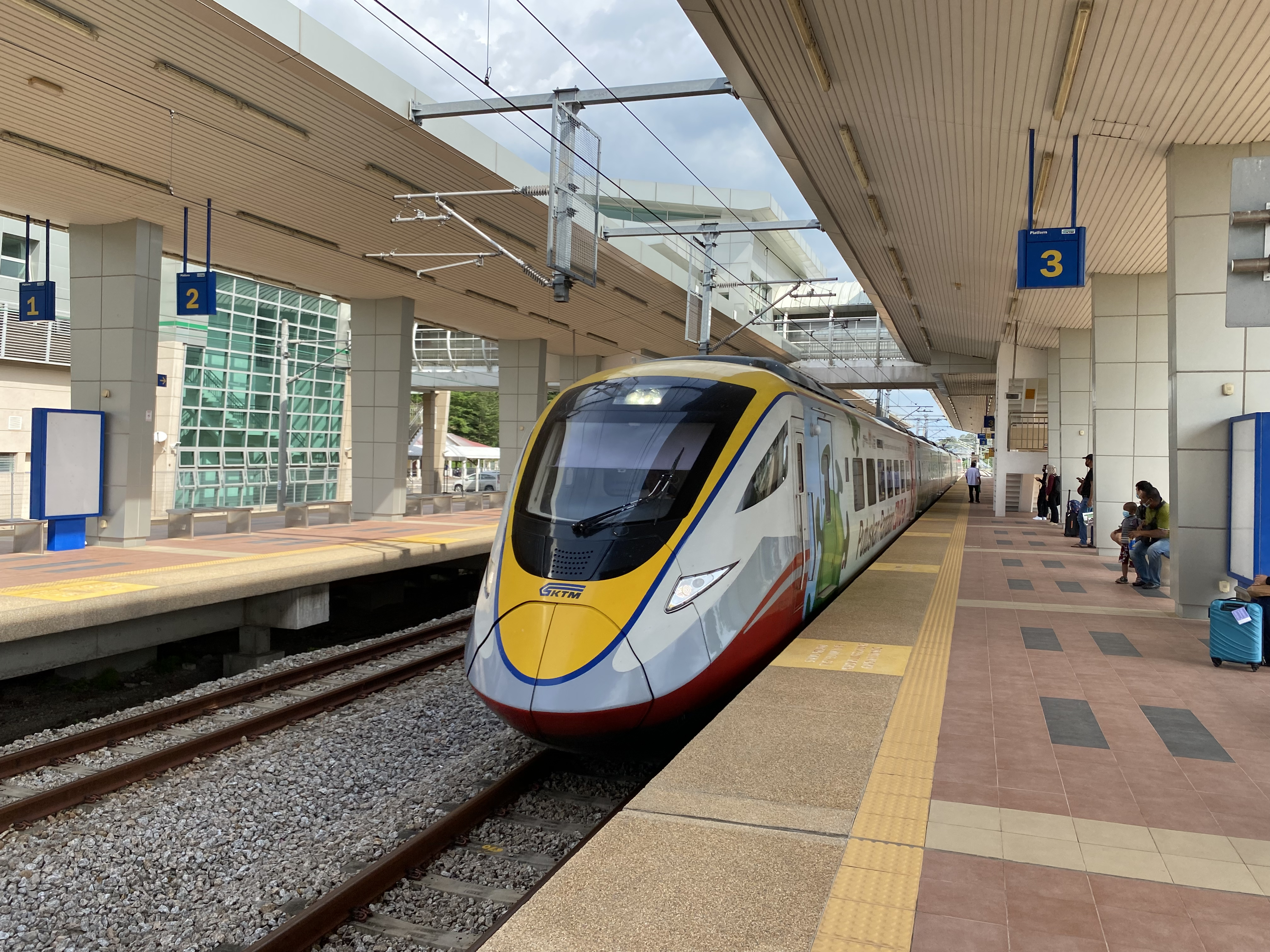
Class 93 entering Pulau Sebang/Tampin

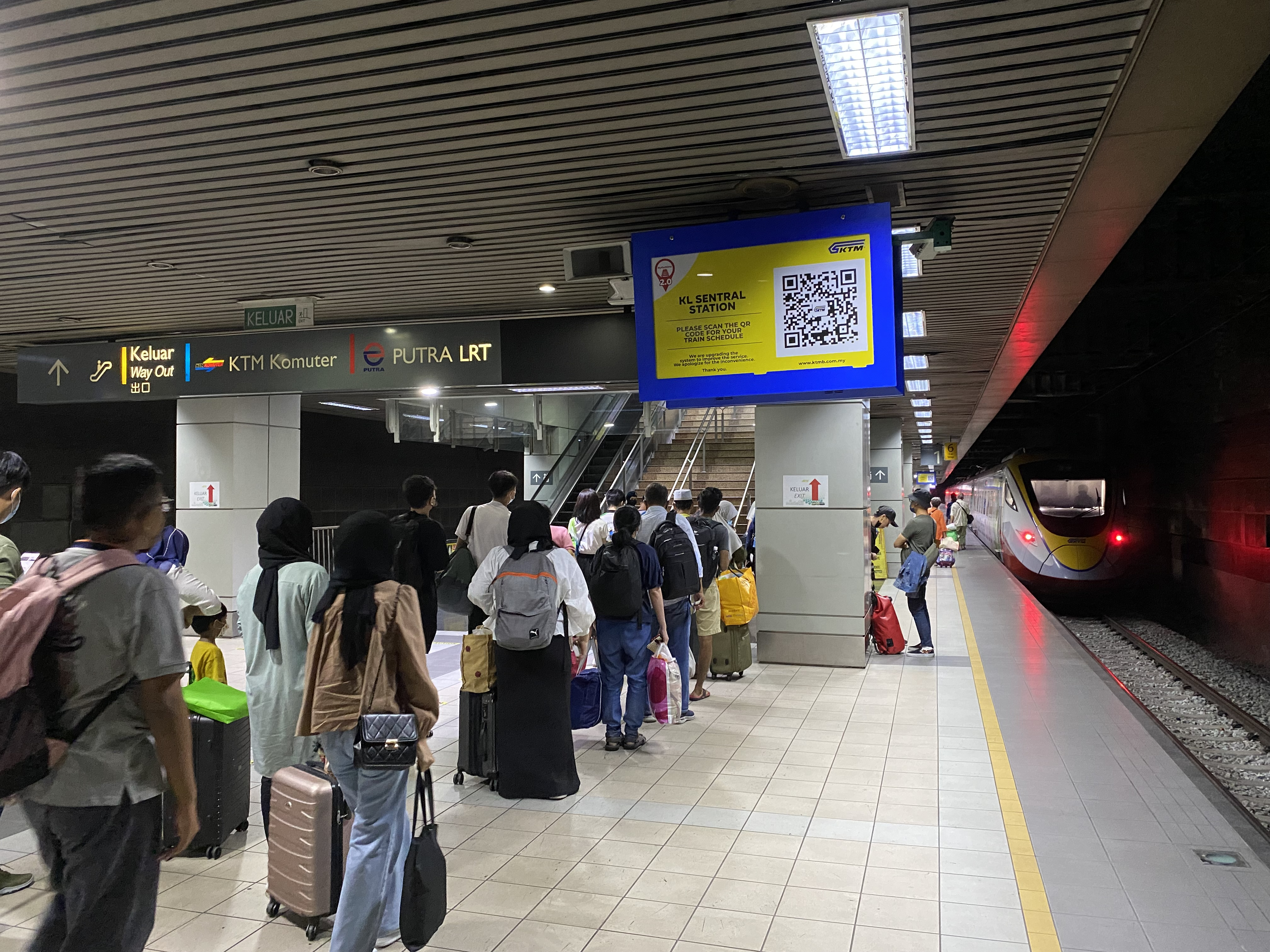
Class 93 at KL Sentral

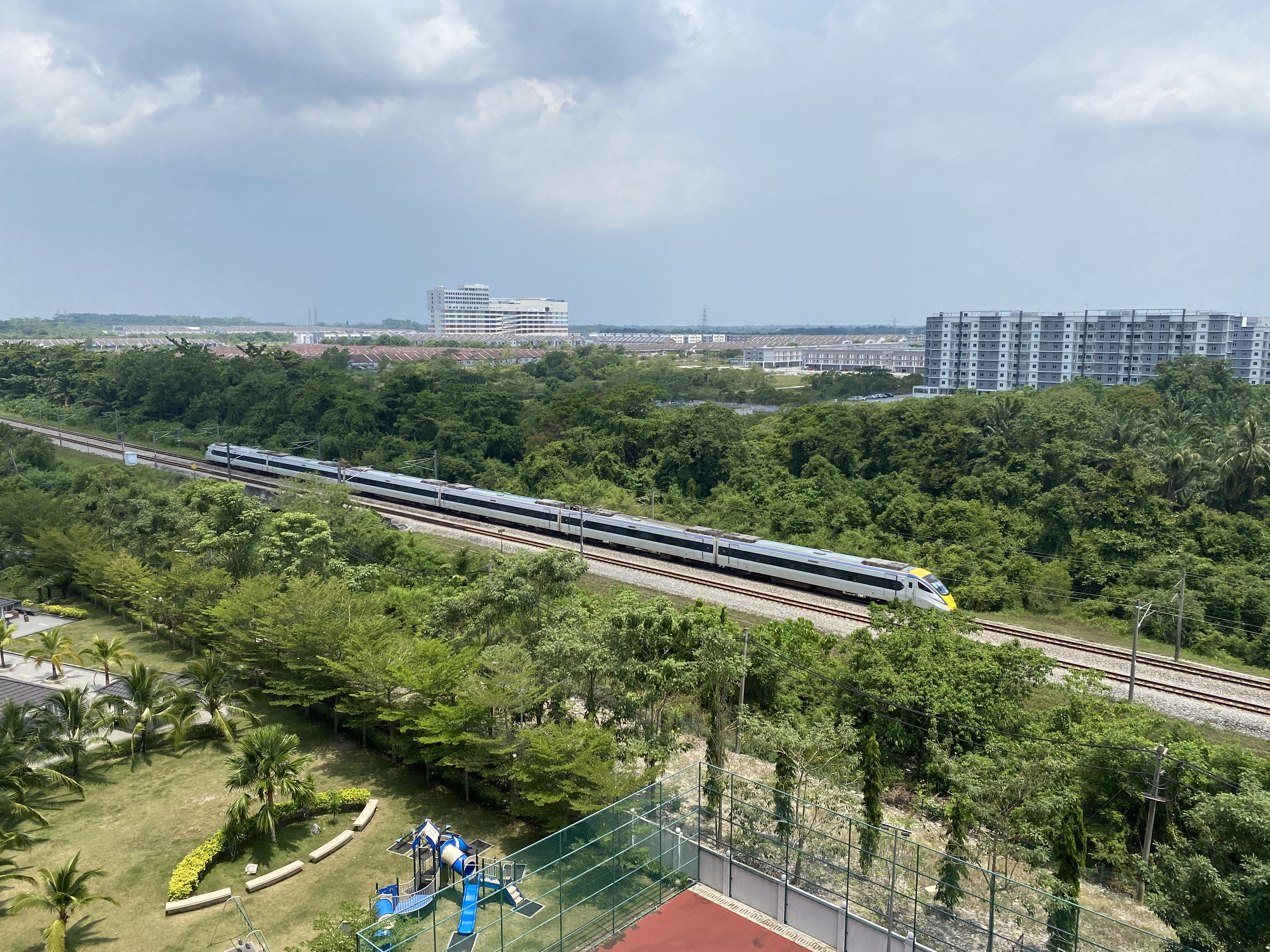
Class 93 passing Kampar, Perak heading North to Batu Gajah

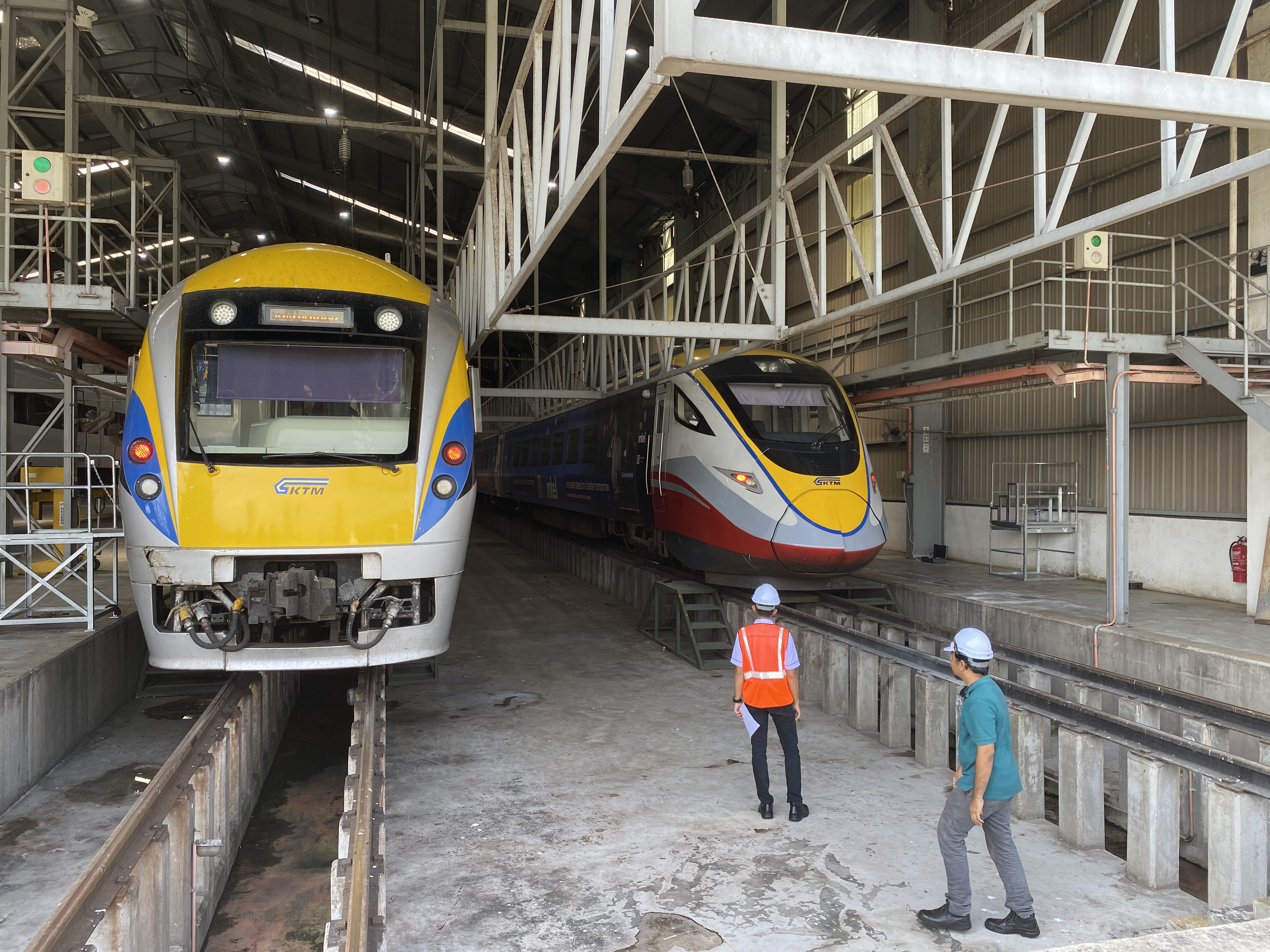
Class 91 and 93 at Batu Gajah Railway Depot

== See also ==
- Keretapi Tanah Melayu
  - KTM Intercity and KTM ETS
    - West Coast Line
    - East Coast Line
  - KTM Komuter
    - Batu Caves–Pulau Sebang Line
    - Tanjung Malim–Port Klang Line
    - KL Sentral–Terminal Skypark Line
    - KTM Komuter Northern Sector
    - KTM Komuter Southern Sector
- Rail transport in Malaysia
- Railway electrification in Malaysia
- Public transport in Kuala Lumpur
