= KTM Class 91 =

Type of electric multiple unit

Class 91
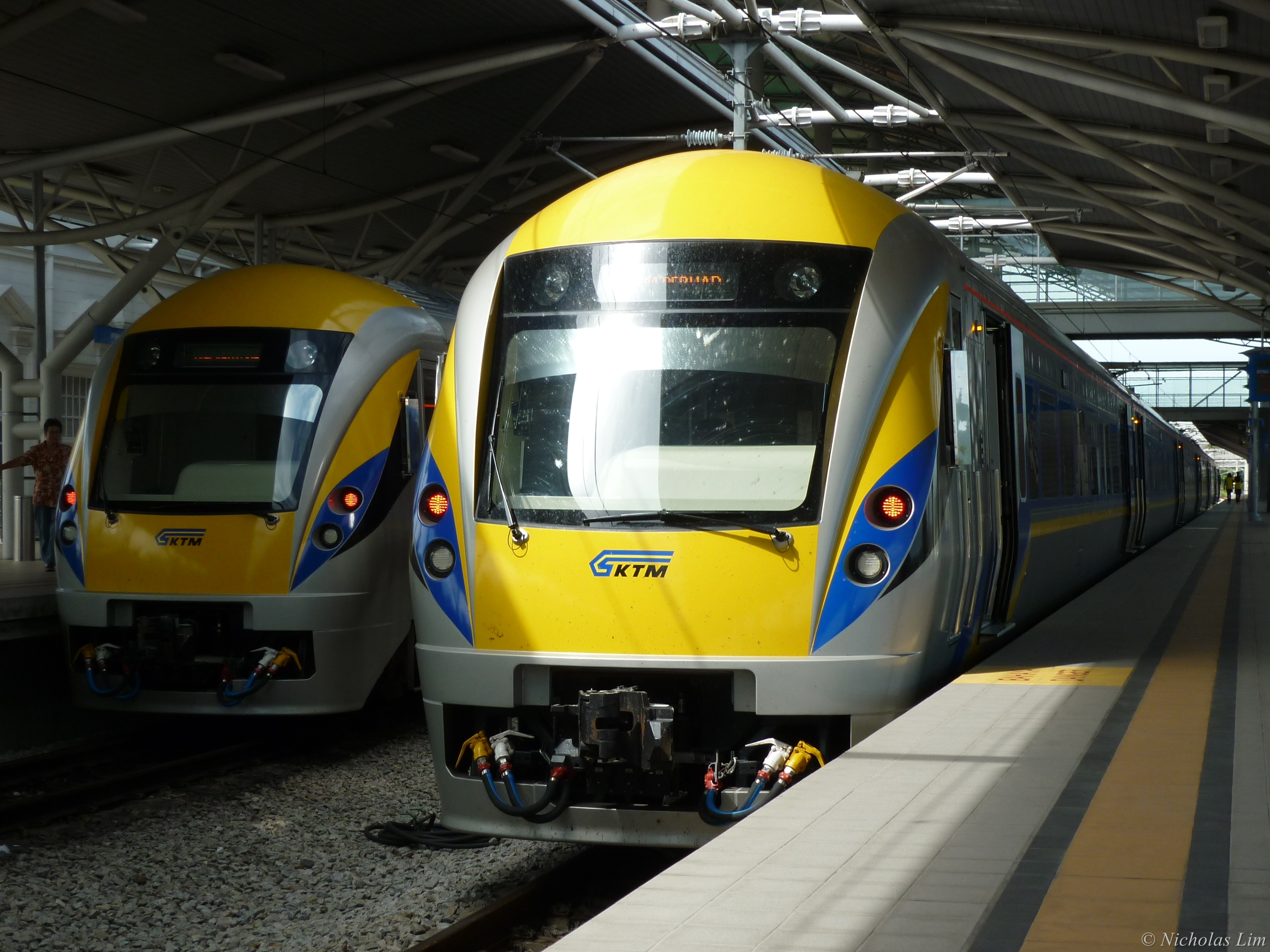
- Class 91 EMUs at Ipoh station
- Stock type: Electric multiple unit (EMU)
- In service: 2010–present
- Manufacturer: Rotem
- Designer: Marubeni
- Constructed: 2008-2009
- Number built: 30 cars (ETS101-ETS105)
- Number in service: 30 cars (5 sets)
- Formation: 6 cars per trainset
- Capacity: (350 seats)
- Operator: Keretapi Tanah Melayu
- Depot: Batu Gajah Rail Depot
- Line served: West Coast Line

Specifications
- Train length: 132.52 m (434 ft 9 5/16 in)
- Car length: 22.26 m (73 ft 3/8 in) (Mc); 22 m (72 ft 2 1/8 in) (Tp/M)
- Width: 2.75 m (9 ft 0 in)
- Height: 3.8 m (12 ft 6 in)
- Doors: 2 single-leaf sliding plug doors per side
- Maximum speed: Service: 140 km/h (90 mph); Design: 160 km/h (100 mph)
- Weight: 231.8 t (228.1 long tons; 255.5 short tons)
- Traction system: Mitsubishi Electric IGBT–C/I
- Traction motors: 16 × Mitsubishi Electric MB-5069-B 150 kW (200 hp) 3-phase AC induction motor
- Power output: 2,400 kW (3,200 hp)
- Electric system: 25 kV 50 Hz AC overhead line
- Current collection: Pantograph
- UIC classification: Bo′Bo′+2′2′+Bo′Bo′+Bo′Bo′+2′2′+Bo′Bo′
- Coupling system: AAR Knuckle
- Seating: Transverse 2+2 layout
- Track gauge: 1,000 mm (3 ft 3 3/8 in) metre gauge

The Class 91 is a type of electric multiple unit currently operating on Keretapi Tanah Melayu's Electric Train Service (ETS) since 2009. KTMB purchased a total of 5 sets worth RM 240 million from a joint venture between South Korea's Rotem Co. and Japan Mitsubishi Electric Corp in 2008. Each set has six coaches.

All five train sets were designed by the Marubeni Corporation and were built by Hyundai Rotem of Korea and Mitsubishi Electric of Japan. The design of the train sets follows very closely the IE 22000 Class of Ireland's InterCity trains. The major difference between the trainsets in Ireland and those used in Malaysia is that the Irish trainsets are diesel operated and use a broad gauge rail (1,600mm) while Malaysia has a metre gauge (1,000mm) system and are electrically powered.

== Operation ==
The class 91 operates in a fixed 6-cars configuration. Currently, class 91 sets are mainly used for long-distance intercity travel. In 2010–2012, 2 sets of KTM class 91 were being used for normal commuter use due to a shortage of trains. While in commuter use, long distance facilities such as toilets and cafes were closed and locked.

The Class 91 usually operates at its service maximum of 140 km/h (87 mph) and is known to sometimes speed at 160 km/h (99 mph) during regular service at certain stretches. Speed is limited partially by the use of narrow gauge.

Train schedule is categorically separated into a number of fixed classes with different ticketing structure afforded to travelling at particular times. i.e. travelling during peak would incur premium ticket cost whereas travel during off-peak mid day incur a discounted fare.

== On-board service ==
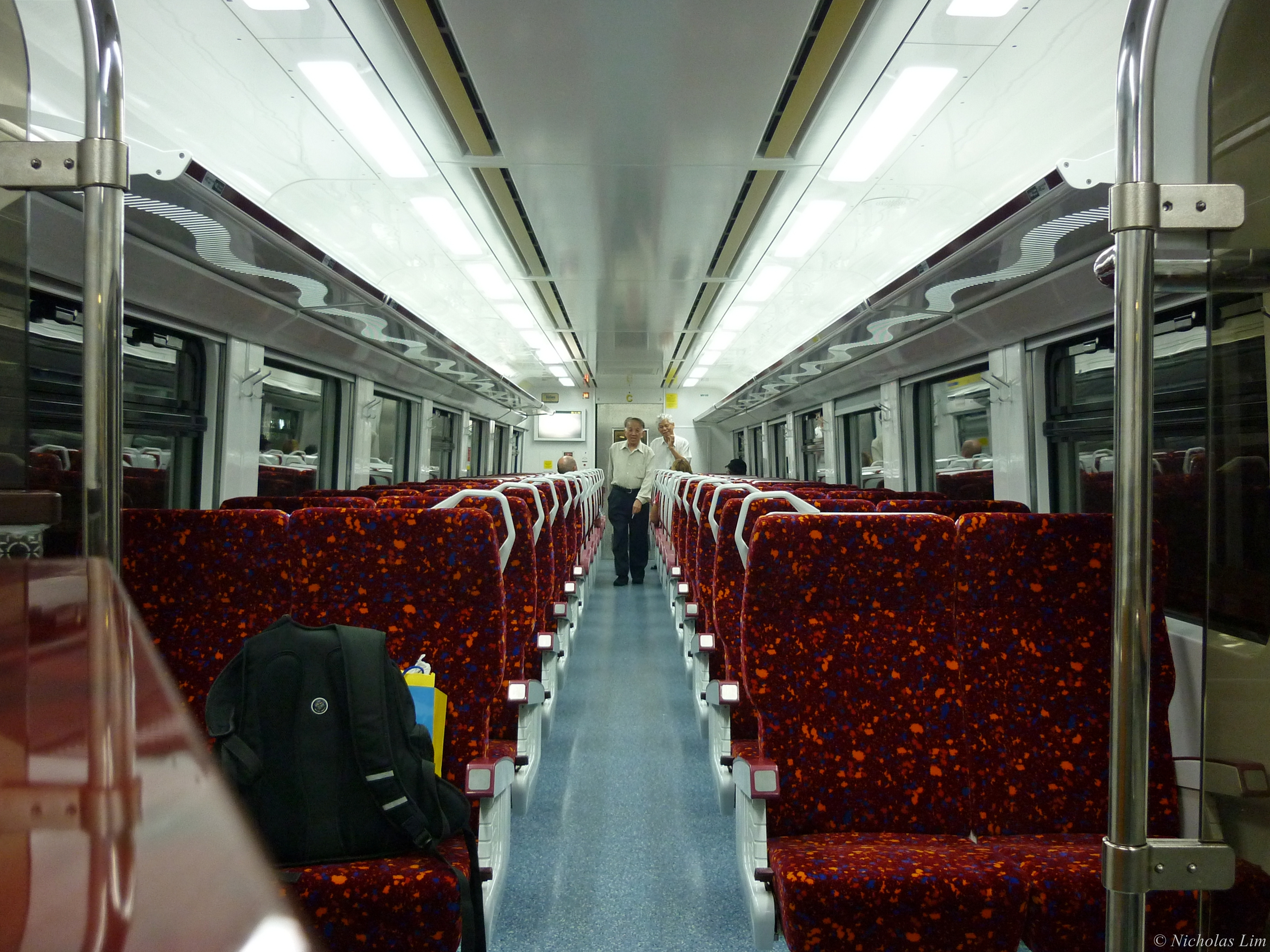
Interior of KTM Class 91

All six cars have standard class only with reserved seats. The seats use red seat covers and arranged in a 2+2 fashion with a tray table and a power outlet facilities. The seats can be easily converted for wheelchair use should the need arise. There is an LCD TV in every coach for entertainment and wheelchair-accessible toilets are available in coach B and E. Bistro coach are available at coach C which sells drinks, light snacks and microwaved meals.

== Maintenance ==
The Class 91 is stabled and maintained at Batu Gajah Rail Depot in Perak.

== Features ==
The Class 91 is one of the first trains in KTMs inventory to feature onboard displays displaying current speed. Train seating is optimised for long distance seating with minimal standing space. Fixed large seats are placed traverse throughout the coach. LCD Displays within coach show feature films, with sound muted but with subtitled English. During long-distance operations, as many as 7 attendants will attend the train set.

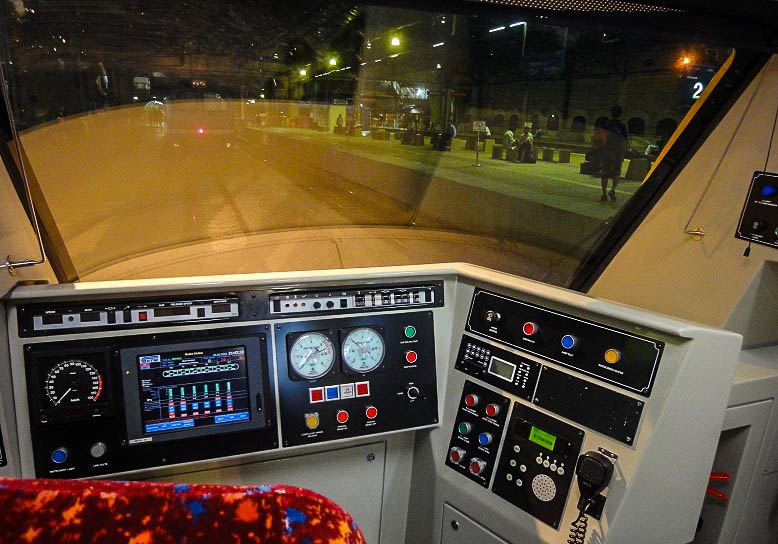
The KTM Class 91 Cab features a mixture of digital and analogue gauges for train control.

== Expansion ==
In the future, there are plans for an additional 20 sets.

However, there are none currently being ordered. Recent orders suggest a different rail class to be introduced. The second generation ETS KTM class 93 has been introduced to further expand the ETS fleet size.

== Formation ==
Car No.	1 (A)	2 (B)	3 (C)	4 (D)	5 (E)	6 (F)
Seating capacity	64	52	54	66	52	64
Designation	Mc	Tp	M	M	Tp	Mc
Features		Toilet	Cafe		Toilet	

Set Designation	1 (A)	2 (B)	3 (C)	4 (D)	5 (E)	6 (F)	Arrival Date	Status	Launch Date
ETS 101	C9101	T9101	M9101	M9102	T9102	C9102	Arrived Dec 9	Operational	2009
ETS 102	C9103	T9103	M9103	M9104	T9104	C9104	Arrived Jan 16	Operational	2009
ETS 103	C9105	T9105	M9105	M9106	T9106	C9106	Arrived March	Operational	2009
ETS 104	C9107	T9107	M9107	M9108	T9108	C9108	Arrived March	Operational	2009
ETS 105	C9109	T9109	M9109	M9110	T9110	C9110	Arrived March	Operational	2009

== Accidents and incidents ==
One ETS Train, ETS104, crashed with an Ekspres Rakyat train at KM322 on 7 May 2016 at 1.40pm. Three passengers were injured and all passengers were safely evacuated. The train was heavily damaged at the front end and has since been abandoned until being fully repaired by SMH Rail in 2023.

== Gallery ==
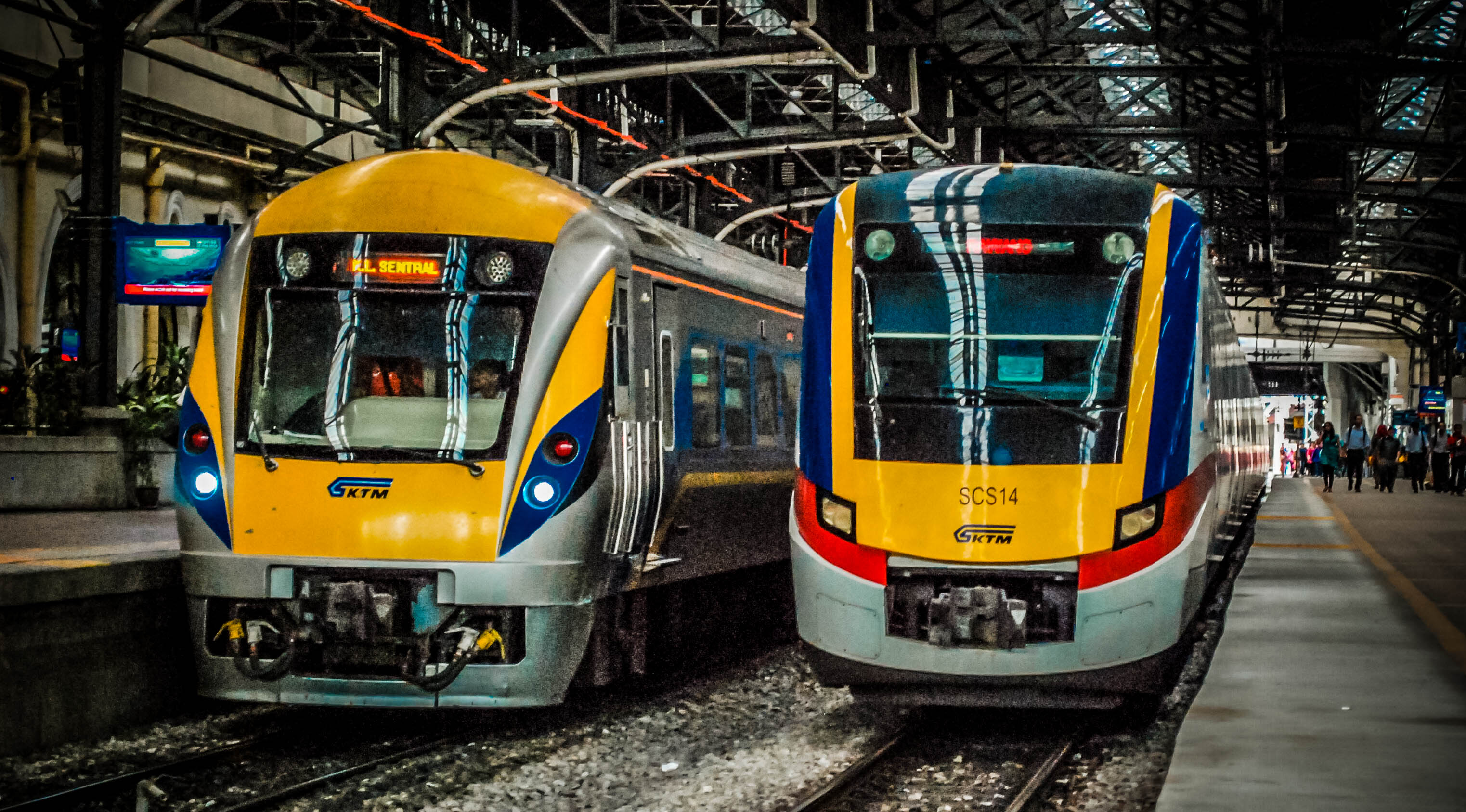
KTM class 91 and class 92 at Kuala Lumpur station

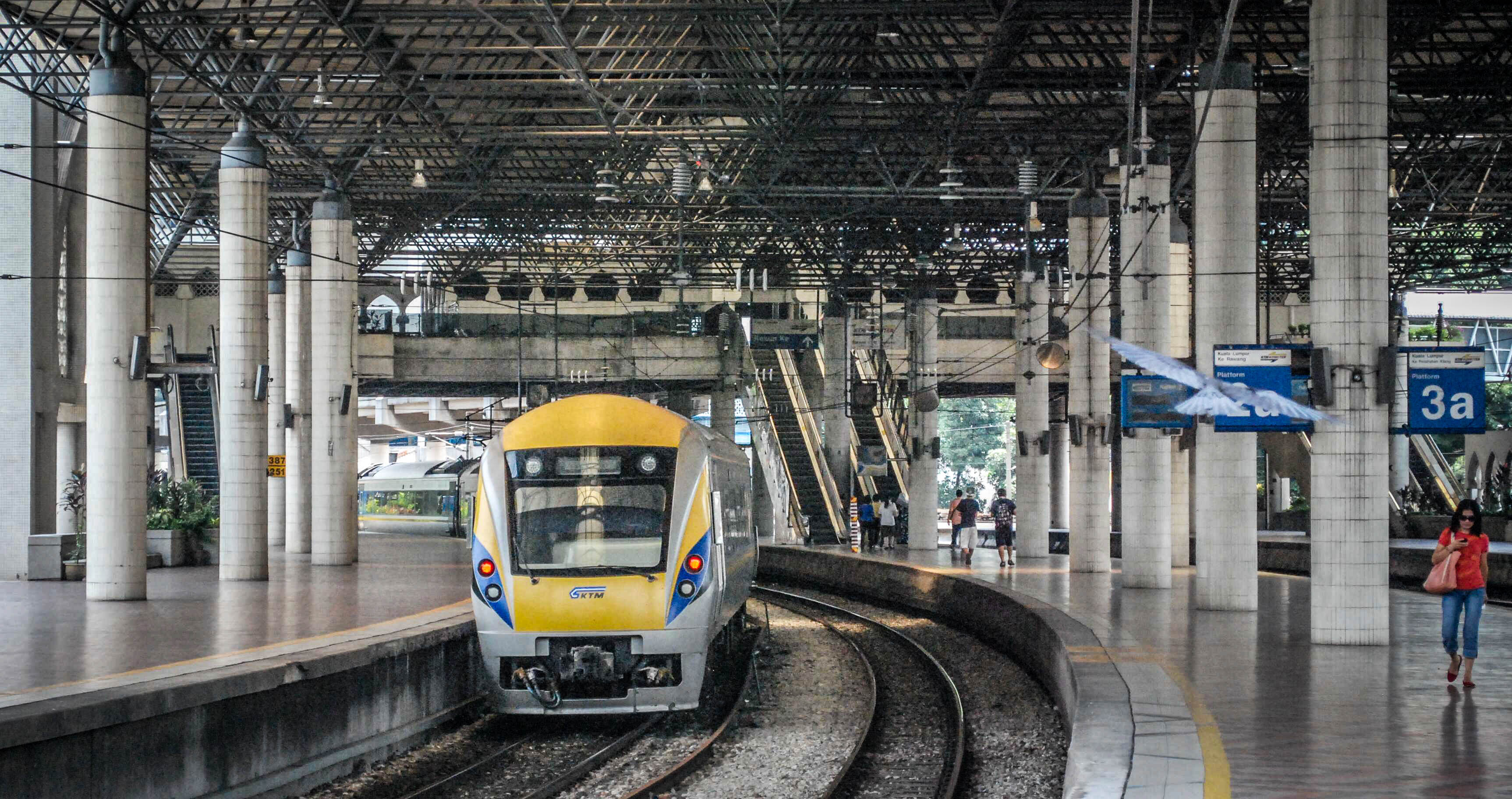
KTM Class 91 at Kuala Lumpur station's extended wing

== See also ==
- IE 22000 Class
- HRCS2
