= KTM Class 94 =

Malaysian electric train

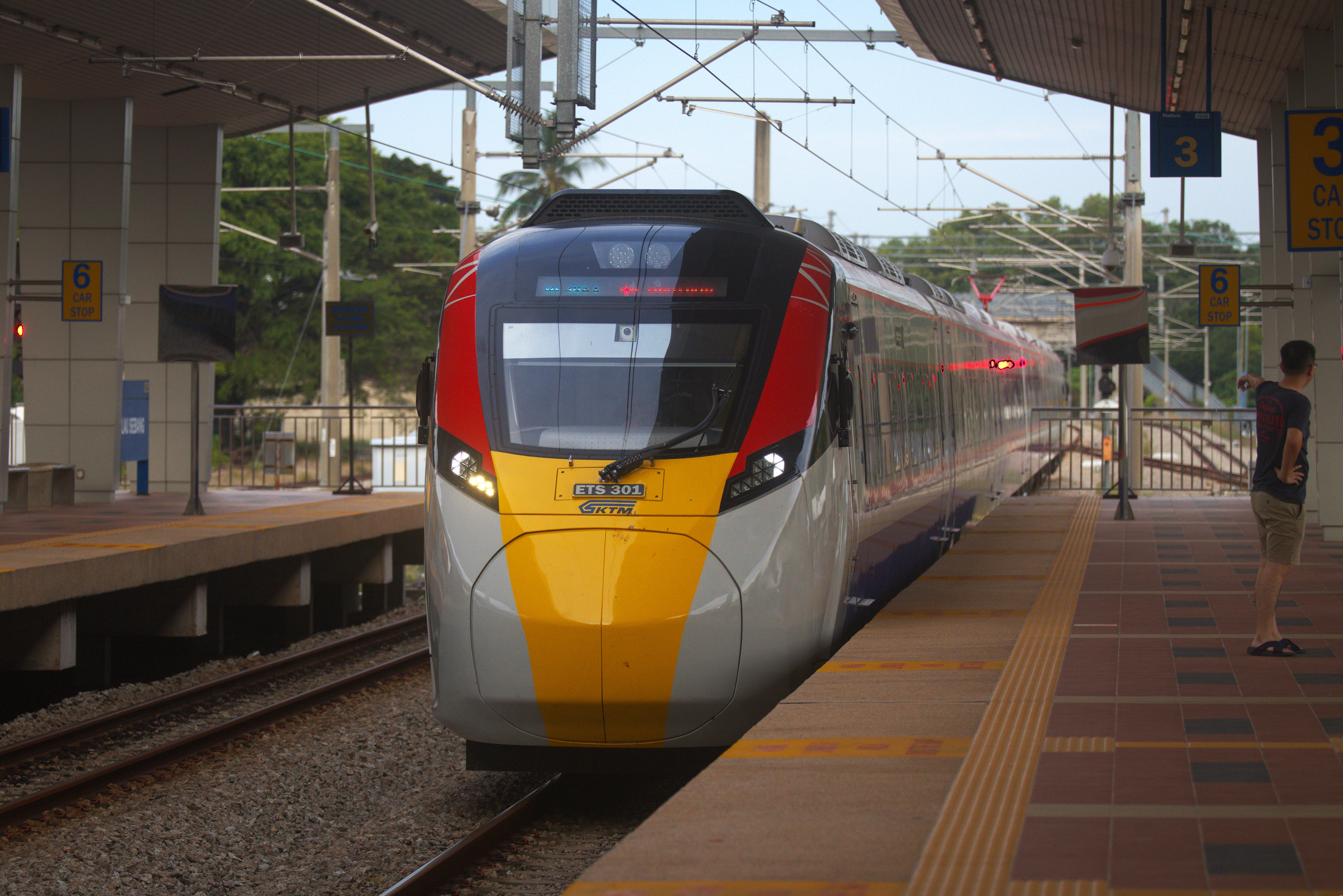
- A Class 94 train arriving at Pulau Sebang/Tampin station
- Stock type: Electric multiple unit
- In service: 30 August 2025–present
- Manufacturers: CRRC Zhuzhou and CRRC Rolling Stock Center Batu Gajah Malaysia
- Constructed: 2023–2025
- Entered service: 30 August 2025
- Number built: 60 cars (10 sets)
- Number in service: 60 cars (10 sets)
- Formation: 6-car sets (4M2T)
- Fleet numbers: ETS 301 - ETS 310
- Capacity: 312(312 seats)
- Operator: Keretapi Tanah Melayu
- Depot: Batu Gajah Rail Depot
- Line served: KTM West Coast railway line

Specifications
- Car body construction: Aluminium
- Train length: 140 m (459 ft 3 13/16 in)
- Car length: 24 m (78 ft 8 7/8 in) (Mc); 23 m (75 ft 5 1/2 in) (Tp/M)
- Width: 2.75 m (9 ft 1/4 in)
- Height: 3,905 mm (12 ft 9 3/4 in)
- Floor height: 1.1 m (3 ft 7 in)
- Doors: 2 single-leaf doors per side
- Wheel diameter: 850 mm (33 in)
- Wheelbase: 8.5 m (27 ft 11 in)
- Maximum speed: Service: 140 km/h (90 mph); Design: 160 km/h (100 mph)
- Weight: 258 t (254 long tons; 284 short tons)
- Traction system: Siemens SIBAC E951 D1442/310 M5 reaq IGBT–C/I
- Traction motors: 16 × Siemens 1TB2004-0GA02 160 kW (210 hp) 3-phase AC induction motor
- Power output: 2,560 kW (3,430 hp)
- Tractive effort: 284 kN (64,000 lb_{f})
- Acceleration: 0.8 m/s^{2} (0 ft/s^{2})
- Electric system: 25 kV 50 Hz AC overhead line
- Current collection: Pantograph
- UIC classification: Bo′Bo′+2′2′+Bo′Bo′+Bo′Bo′+2′2′+Bo′Bo′
- Minimum turning radius: 100m
- Braking system: Electro-pneumatic regenerative brake system
- Safety systems: ETCS, ATP
- Coupling system: AAR
- Seating: 312 seats
- Track gauge: 1,000 mm (3 ft 3 3/8 in) metre gauge

The KTM Class 94 is a type of electric multiple unit manufactured for Keretapi Tanah Melayu (KTM), used on Electric Train Service (ETS) between Padang Besar and JB Sentral. Branded as ETS 3, these sets started operations on the new KL Sentral–Kluang route on 30 August 2025 and currently serve the route mainly from KL Sentral to JB Sentral

== Procurement ==
A tender was called by Ministry of Transport in May 2020 for 10 six-car intercity EMUs, with three manufacturers putting up bids for the project.

CRRC Zhuzhou Locomotive, which had manufactured the earlier Class 93, was awarded the tender for the new trains. As part of the conditions, 2 sets would be manufactured at CRRC Zhuzhou's factory in China while the remaining 8 sets would be manufactured in CRRC's factory in Batu Gajah, Malaysia.

== Features ==
The train has a capacity of 312 seats, with 276 standard class seats and 36 business class seats.

Compared to the earlier Class 93, the class features a 14.2% improvement in acceleration and a 24.5% increase in tractive effort. The battery capacity for auxiliary power is 640 A h, double that of the Class 93s. This allows the train's emergency lighting and ventilation system to function for two hours without overhead catenary supply.

The train meets the EN 15227 crashworthiness standard and EN 45545 fire safety standards.

== Design and construction ==
The exterior livery has a patriotic design with the National Flower Colours inspired by the Flag of Malaysia. The interior also features the national flower of Malaysia, the hibiscus motif on the bulkhead and lower side wall of Coach A. Sets no.301-305 features ocean blue seats whereas sets no.306-310 features black and golden seats.

Just like the earlier KTM Class 93, the KTM Class 94 reportedly sources all its components from China, with the exception of the on-board equipment (such as is the ATP) and the traction system which is sourced from the Chinese subsidiaries of Bombardier and Siemens respectively.

== On-board service ==
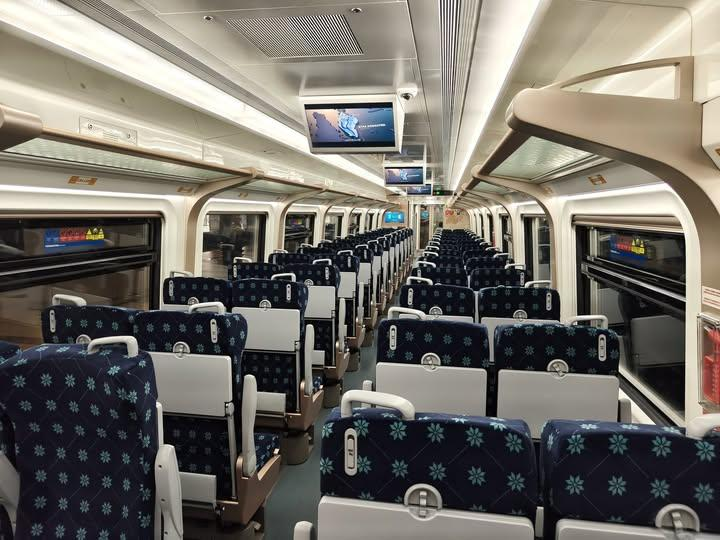
Standard Class interior on sets no.301-305

Standard Class: The seats on all trains are arranged in a 2+2 configuration, with each seat featuring a tray table and a power outlet. Cluster seats with fixed tables are available. The seats can be easily converted for wheelchair use if necessary. The train seats can be rotated to face any direction. Each coach is equipped with LCD TV screens for entertainment, and toilets are available in every coach. The train also include changing tables for infants. For Muslim passengers, a prayer room is available on every train. There is also a bistro coach that sells drinks, light snacks, and microwaved meals.

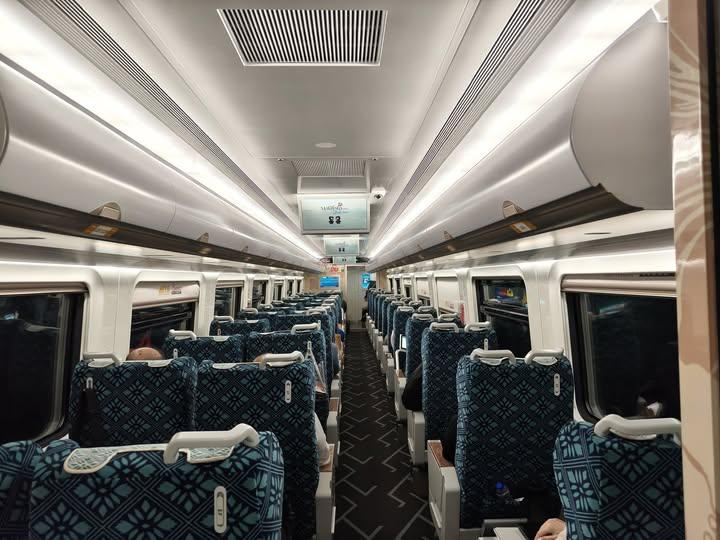
Business Class interior on sets no.301-305

Business Class: The Business class accommodation and service marks a step up from the standard class. In addition to the facilities already enjoyed in standard class, there are additional features otherwise not seen on the standard class. The seats are arranged in a 2+1 configuration and are wider and able to recline up to 45 degrees. Each seat has its own on demand video screen for in-train entertainment. Wi-Fi is complimentary for business class passengers. Each coach has its own steward or stewardess, which the passenger can summon from his seat. On-board dining is included in the fare. Passengers are given their own amenity kit.

== Delivery ==
The first set was completed on 8 June 2024 and was handed over to the Transport Ministry in a ceremony at the CRRC Zhuzhou factory. The remaining sets are fully delivered on 12 August 2025.

== Launching ==
The first of 10 Class 94 sets, ETS 301 entered service on 30 August 2025, operating between KL Sentral and Kluang on the ETS Platinum service. As of February 2026, all 10 sets are in service.

== Formation ==
Each train set is formed as follows, with cars numbered alphabetically (A to F) instead of numerically, and with Car 1 (A) facing south (KL Sentral, Kluang, Johor Bahru Sentral) and Car 6 (F) facing north (KL Sentral, Butterworth, Padang Besar). The first car is equipped with 36 business class seats.

Car No.	A	B	C	D	E	F
Seating capacity	36	60	54	42 (+4)	60	60
Designation	Mc	Tp	M	M	Tp	Mc
Features	Toilet	Toilet	Cafe	Toilet	Toilet	

Set Designation	1	2	3	4	5	6	Status	Launch Date	Assembled in
Class 94 ETS 301	C9401	T9401	M9401	M9402	T9402	C9402	In Service	30 Aug 2025	China
Class 94 ETS 302	C9403	T9403	M9403	M9404	T9404	C9404	In Service	Sep 2025	China
Class 94 ETS 303	C9405	T9405	M9405	M9406	T9406	C9406	In Service	Nov 2025	Malaysia
Class 94 ETS 304	C9407	T9407	M9407	M9408	T9408	C9408	In Service	Dec 2025	Malaysia
Class 94 ETS 305	C9409	T9409	M9409	M9410	T9410	C9410	In Service	Jan 2026	Malaysia
Class 94 ETS 306	C9411	T9411	M9411	M9412	T9412	C4312	In Service	Feb 2026	Malaysia
Class 94 ETS 307	C9413	T9413	M9413	M9414	T9414	C9414	In Service	Feb 2026	Malaysia
Class 94 ETS 308	C9415	T9415	M9415	M9416	T9416	C9416	In Service	Feb 2026	Malaysia
Class 94 ETS 309	C9417	T9417	M9417	M9418	T9418	C9418	In Service	Feb 2026	Malaysia
Class 94 ETS 310	C9419	T9419	M9419	M9420	T9420	C9420	In Service	Feb 2026	Malaysia

Cars 2 and 5 are equipped with a double-arm Z-shaped pantograph.
