= Shanghai Metro rolling stock =

This article lists the rolling stock of the Shanghai Metro, a rapid transit system serving Shanghai. The table below contain the 1,190 trains with 7,394 carriages on the Shanghai Metro operational as of January 2021. There are 51 models in service as of August 2025.

Standard gauge is used throughout the network, allowing new train equipment to be transported over the Chinese rail network which uses the same gauge. In contrast to many other metro systems in the world, the Shanghai Metro uses overhead wires for the power supply, except for line 16, line 17 and Pujiang line which use third rail. All lines with overhead wires are DC1500V overhead wires. The overhead wires is divided into overhead catenary and overhead conductor rails. Except for the earlier construction of lines 1–4, all underground sections are powered by overhead conductor rails, and the rest are powered by overhead catenary.

== Power supply ==
Shanghai Metro has set up 110kV main transformer station, subordinate AC33～35kV traction transformer station, AC10kV station transformer station (output three-phase four-line AC400V), and new line station uses AC35kV step-down substation (output three-phase four-line AC400V). The traction transformer station is a subordinate AC33kV to AC1250V transformer station, and an AC1250V rectifier station. After rectification, the voltage rises to DC1500V to DC1800V, and then it is transmitted to the overhead wires. The station uses AC220V for lighting and AC400V for large equipment. Shanghai Rail Transit usually uses an inter-area two-way power supply mode.

On line 2, Siemens Transportation Systems equipped the line with an overhead contact line (cantilever material: galvanized steel) and 7 DC traction power supply substations.

== Rolling stock ==
Initially, Siemens (global market share: 14%), Alstom (global market share: 18%) and Bombardier (global market share: 23%) directly sold the A-class trains to China, and then moved their production bases to China to produce and assemble the A-class trains by cooperating with large Chinese locomotive manufacturers. Shanghai Electric and Alstom set up a joint venture company, Shanghai Alstom Transportation Equipment Co., Ltd., Changchun Railway Passenger Vehicle Co., Ltd. and Bombardier set up a joint venture company, and Zhuzhou Electric Locomotive Co., Ltd. cooperated with Siemens. On September 22, 2007 the first A-class train with independent intellectual property rights was produced at the production base of Rail Transit Equipment Company in Minhang.

Trains used in the Shanghai metro system
Line	Class	Carriages	Number of trains	Number of carriages	Time of manufacture	Maximum speed	Automation	Notes
1	A	8	84	672	1992–2019	80 km/h (50 mph)	GoA2 / STO	
2	A	8	100	800	2000–2020	80 km/h (50 mph)	GoA3 / DTO	
3	A	6	49	294	2002–2017	80 km/h (50 mph)	GoA2 / STO	
4	A	6	42	252	2004–2017	80 km/h (50 mph)	GoA2 / STO	
5	C	4/6	50	200	2002–2019	80 km/h (50 mph)	GoA3 / DTO	
		4	17	68	2002–2004			Operated on branchline. Only trains in which passengers cannot move between carriages.
		6	33	132	2017–2019			Operated on mainline.
6	C	4	76	304	2007–2020	80 km/h (50 mph)	GoA2 / STO	
7	A	6	79	474	2008–2020	80 km/h (50 mph)	GoA2 / STO	
8	C	6/7	90	602	2006–2020	80 km/h (50 mph)	GoA2 / STO	
		6	28	168	2006–2008			
		7	62	434	2009–2020			
9	A	6	104	624	2004–2020	80 km/h (50 mph)	GoA2 / STO	
10	A	6	67	402	2009–2019	80 km/h (50 mph)	GoA4 / UTO	On August 9, 2014 it was provided with GoA4 / UTO.
11	A	6	82	492	2008–2016	100 km/h (62 mph)	GoA2 / STO	
12	A	6	75	450	2011–2020	80 km/h (50 mph)	GoA2 / STO	12A03 trains have USB charging points.
13	A	6	62	372	2011–2018	80 km/h (50 mph)	GoA2 / STO	
14	A	8	49	392	2019–2020	80 km/h (50 mph)	GoA4 / UTO	
15	A	6	54	324	2019–2020	80 km/h (50 mph)	GoA4 / UTO	All equipped with USB charging and wireless charging points.
16	A (Note: Class A trains for Line 16, only three doors on each side per carriage instead of five for standard Class A carriages.)	6	38	228	2012–2020	120 km/h (75 mph)	GoA2 / STO	Some trains have USB charging points. Trains use tandem seats.
17	A	6	38	228	2015–2024	100 km/h (62 mph)	GoA3 / DTO CASCO TRANAVI (Note: It is the first locally developed DTO system by CASCO Signal Ltd. (a joint venture between CRSC and Alstom), headquartered in Shanghai.) (Note: TRANAVI can be replaced and interconnected with Urbalis 888. Safe and efficient operation can be realized with mixed configuration.) (Note: The TRANAVI system is also applied to Shanghai Zhangjiang Training Line.)	
18	A	6	56	336	2019–2025	80 km/h (50 mph)	GoA4 / UTO; Alstom Urbalis 888	In-carriage wireless and USB phone charging.
Pujiang	L	4	11	44	2016–2017	80 km/h (50 mph)	GoA4 / UTO; Bombardier CITYFLO 650	Cars with rubber tires running on concrete tracks.
Total			1,190	7,394				

=== Signaling ===
In the beginning lines were built in an era where moving block CBTC systems were expensive and China had no experience with them. Therefore, lines 1-5 had fixed block signalling capable of headways above 2.5 minutes. Line 3, Line 4, and Line 5 used ALSTOM URBALIS 200, Line 1 and line 2 uses Union Switch & Signal (now Ansaldo STS USA) AF900.

Level of automation	Lines
GoA2 (Grade-of-Automation 2) (Note: In a Grade-of-Automation 2 (GoA2) system, trains run automatically from station to station but a driver is in the cab, with responsibility for door closing, obstacle detection on the track in front of the train and handling of emergency situations. As in a GoA3 system, the GoA2 train cannot operate safely without the staff member on board.)	1 3 4 6 7 8 9 11 12 13 16
GoA3 (Grade-of-Automation 3) (Note: In a Grade-of-Automation 3 (GoA3) system, trains run automatically from station to station but a staff member is always in the train, with responsibility for handling of emergency situations. In a GoA3 system, the train cannot operate safely without the staff member on board.)	2 5 17
GoA4 (Grade-of-Automation 4) (Note: In a Grade-of-Automation 4 (GoA4) system, trains are capable of operating automatically at all times, including door closing, obstacle detection and emergency situations. On-board staff may be provided for other purposes, e.g. customer service, but are not required for safe operation. Controls are often provided to drive the train manually in the event of a computer failure.)	10 14 15 18 Pujiang

Currently, lines 1 and 2 use CASCO, lines 5 and 14 use Thales, Shanghai Electric TSTCBTC2.0, lines 6, 7, 8, 9, 11 use THALES SelTrac lines 10, 12, 13, 15, 16, 18 use ALSTOM Urbalis Line 17 uses CASCO TRANAVI and Pujiang line uses FITSCO JeRail.

==== CBTC and TACS installation ====
Line 2 and Line 5 have upgraded the signaling systems to equip with CBTC. Line 3 and Line 4 are undergoing an upgrade between June 28, 2021 and 2025 – with moving block TACS capable of headways as low as 90 seconds.

== Gallery ==
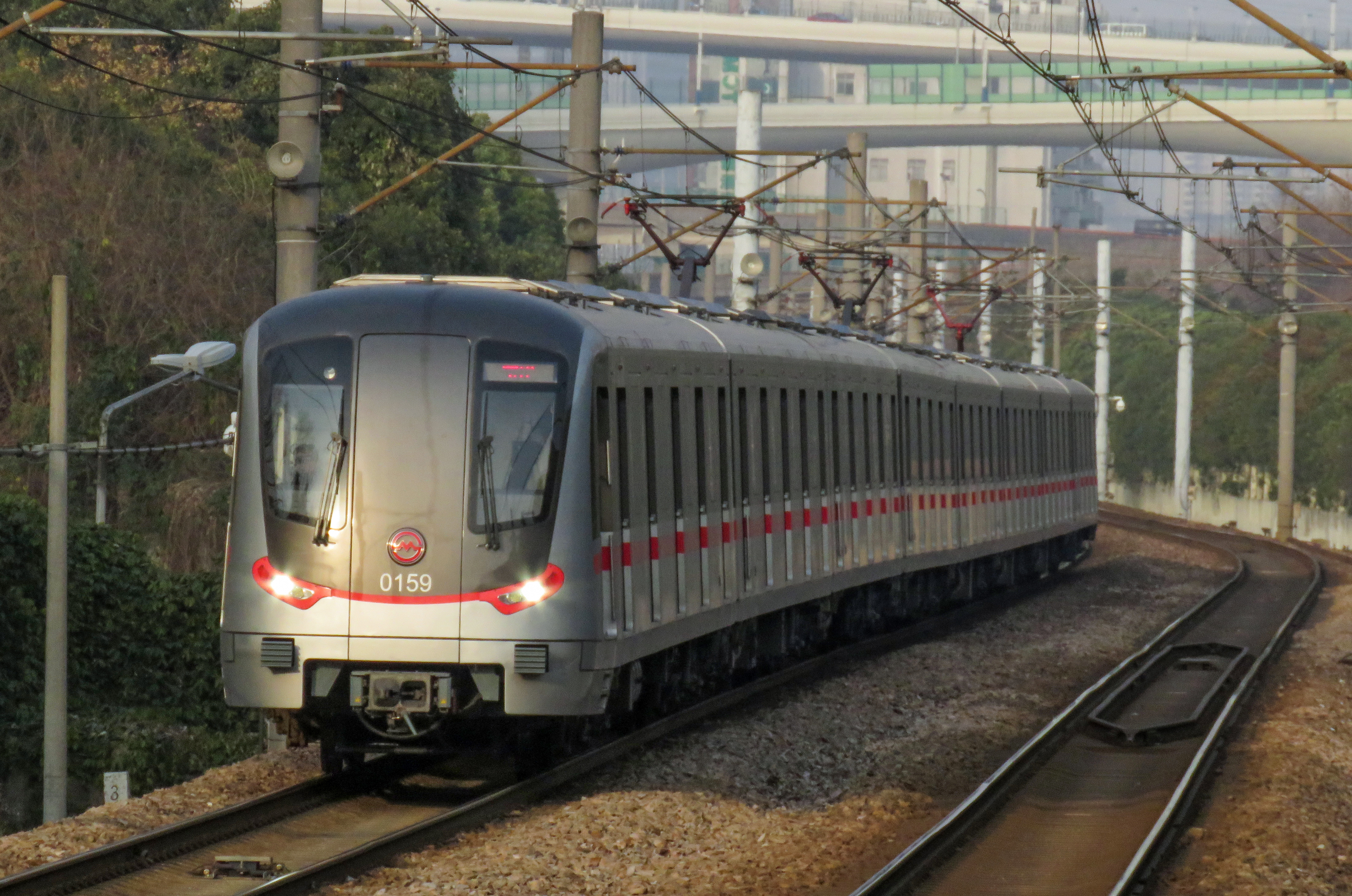
01A06

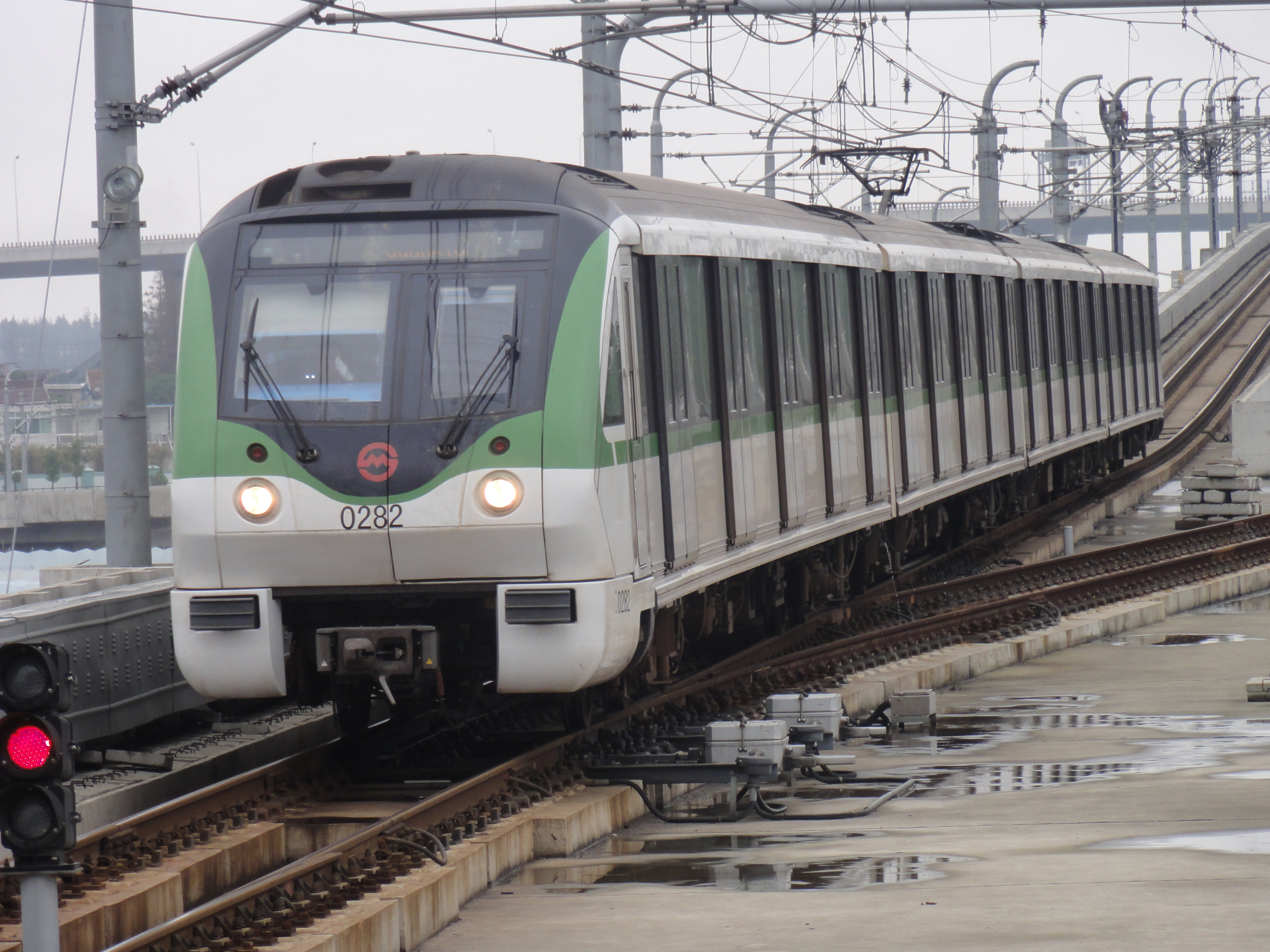
02A04

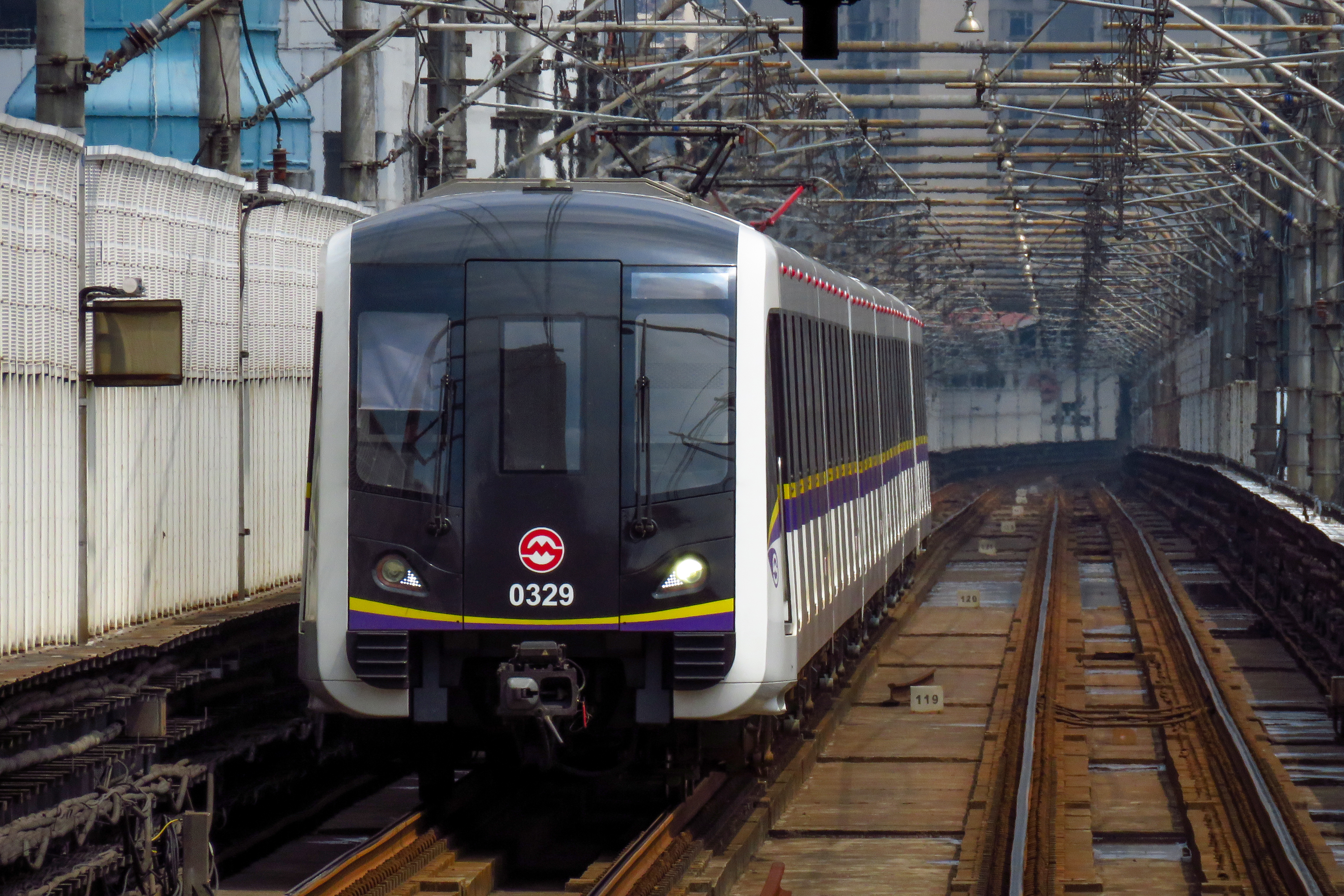
03A02

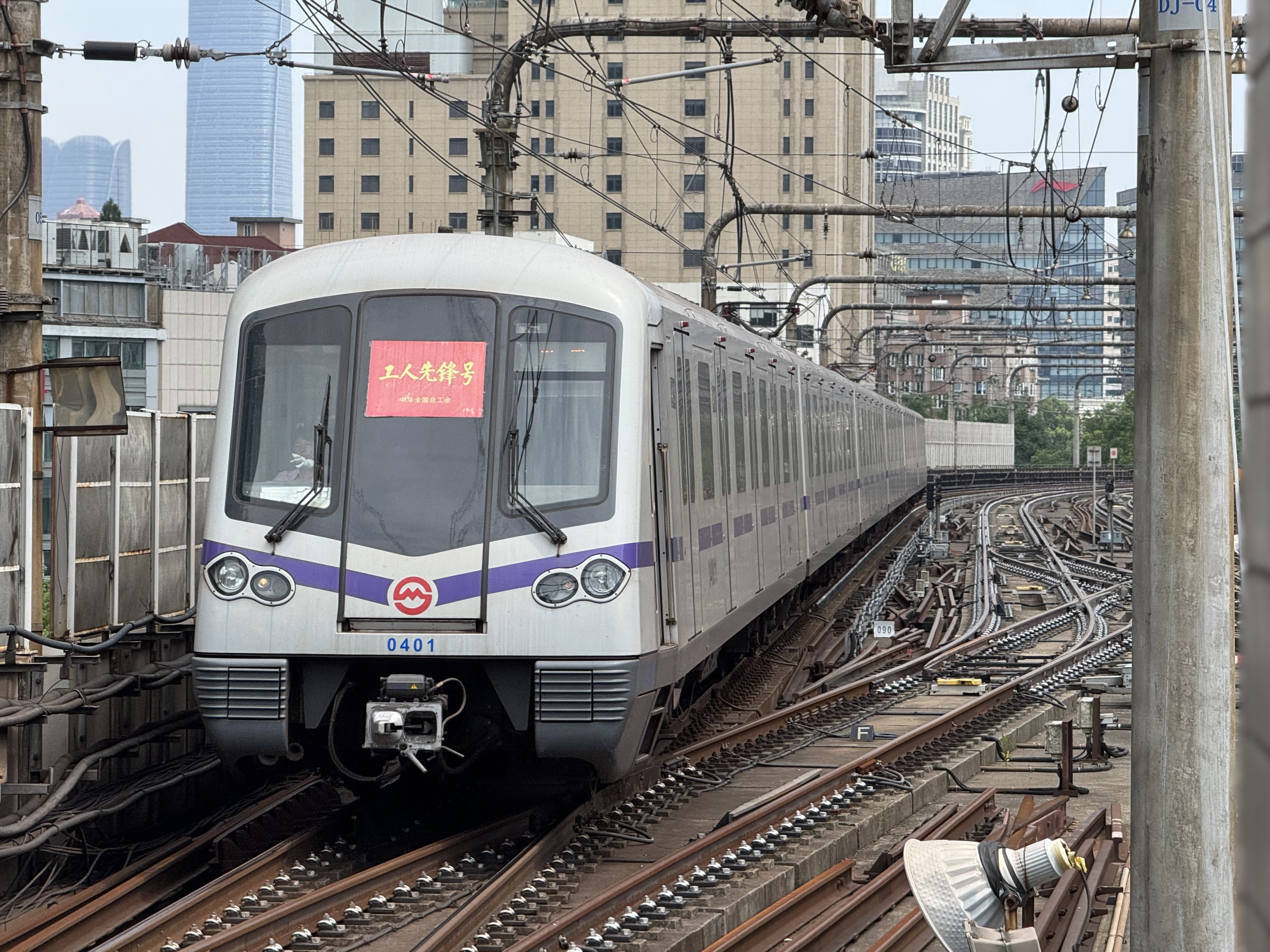
04A01

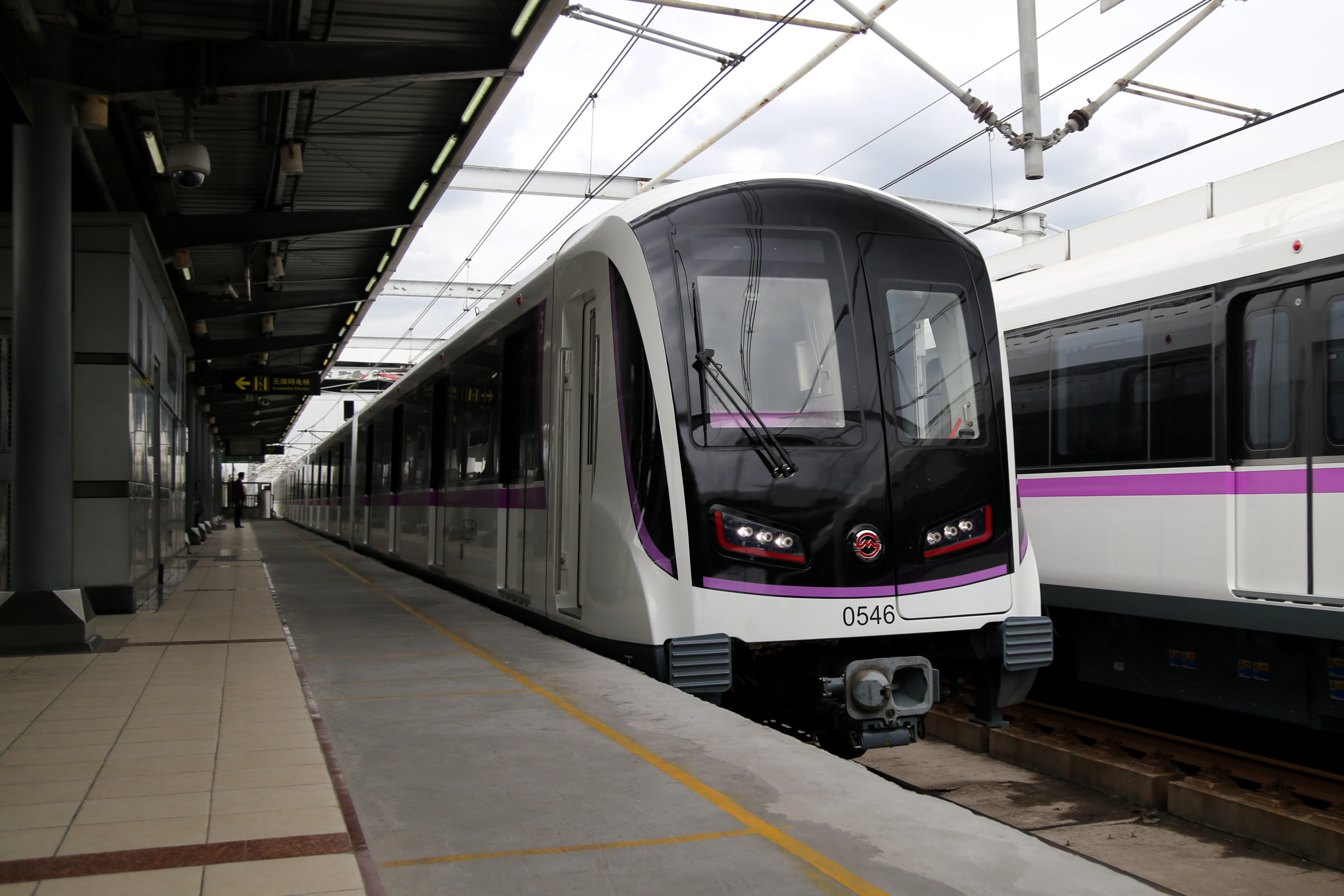
05C02

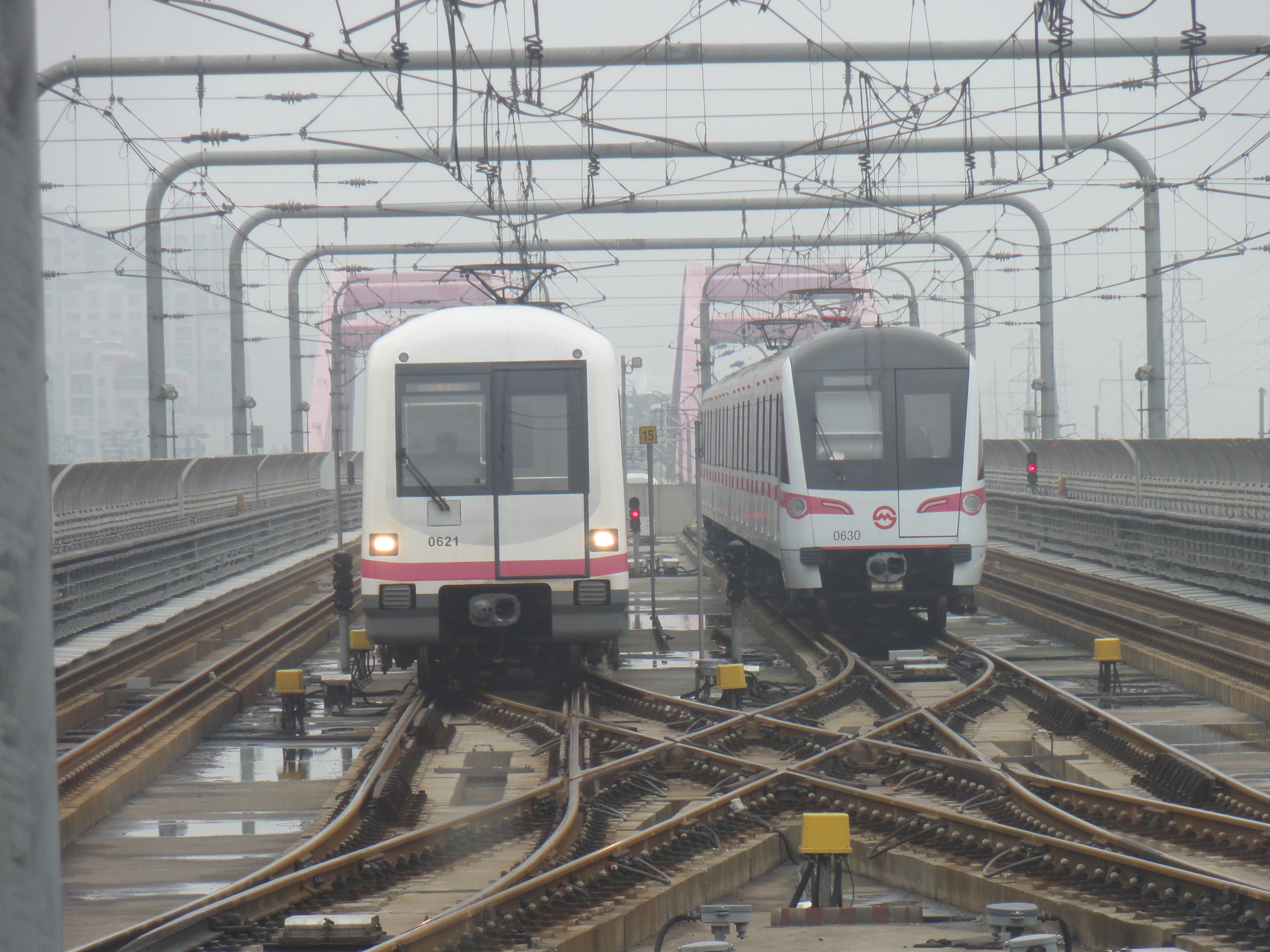
06C01 and 06C02

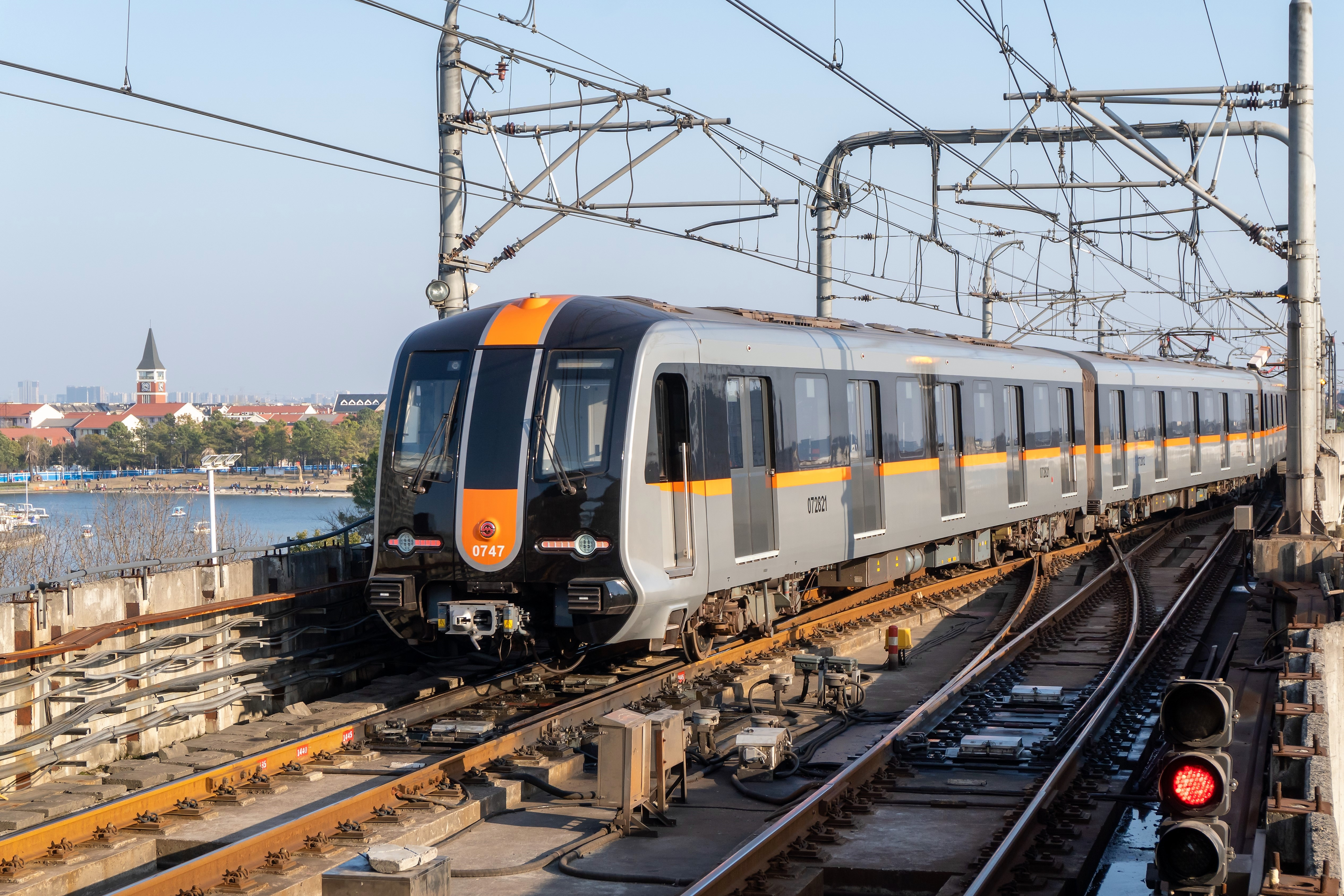
07A02

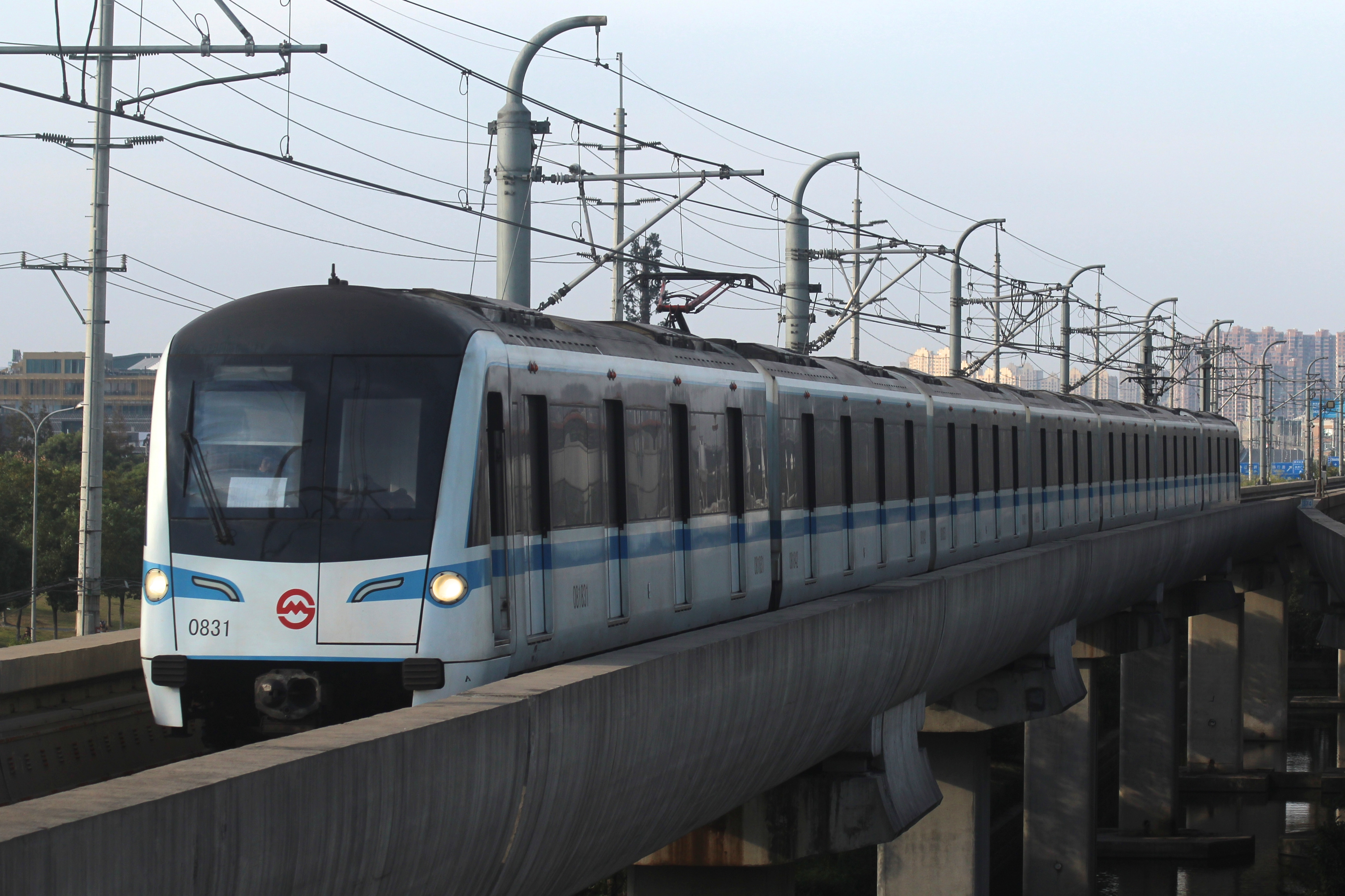
08C02

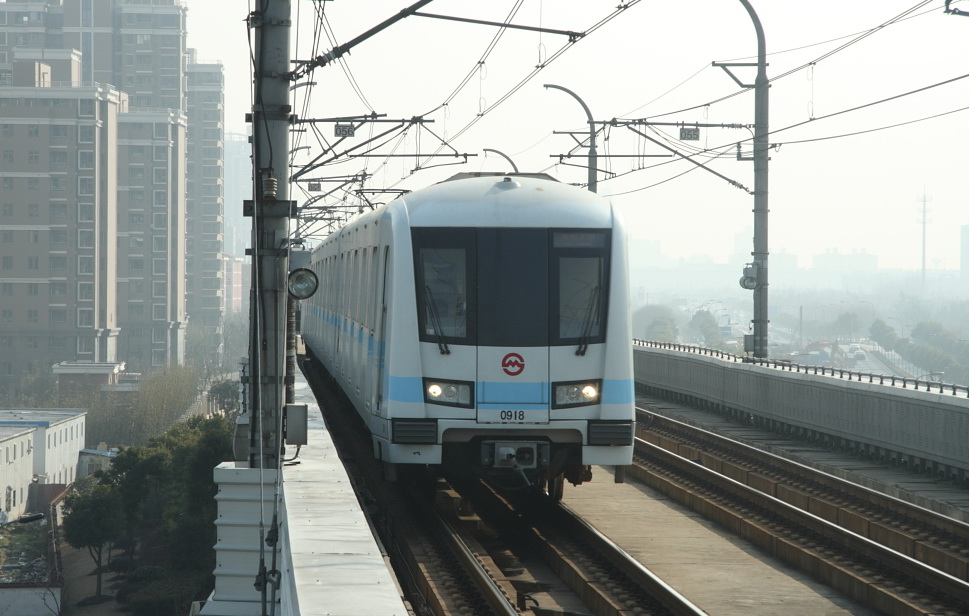
09A02

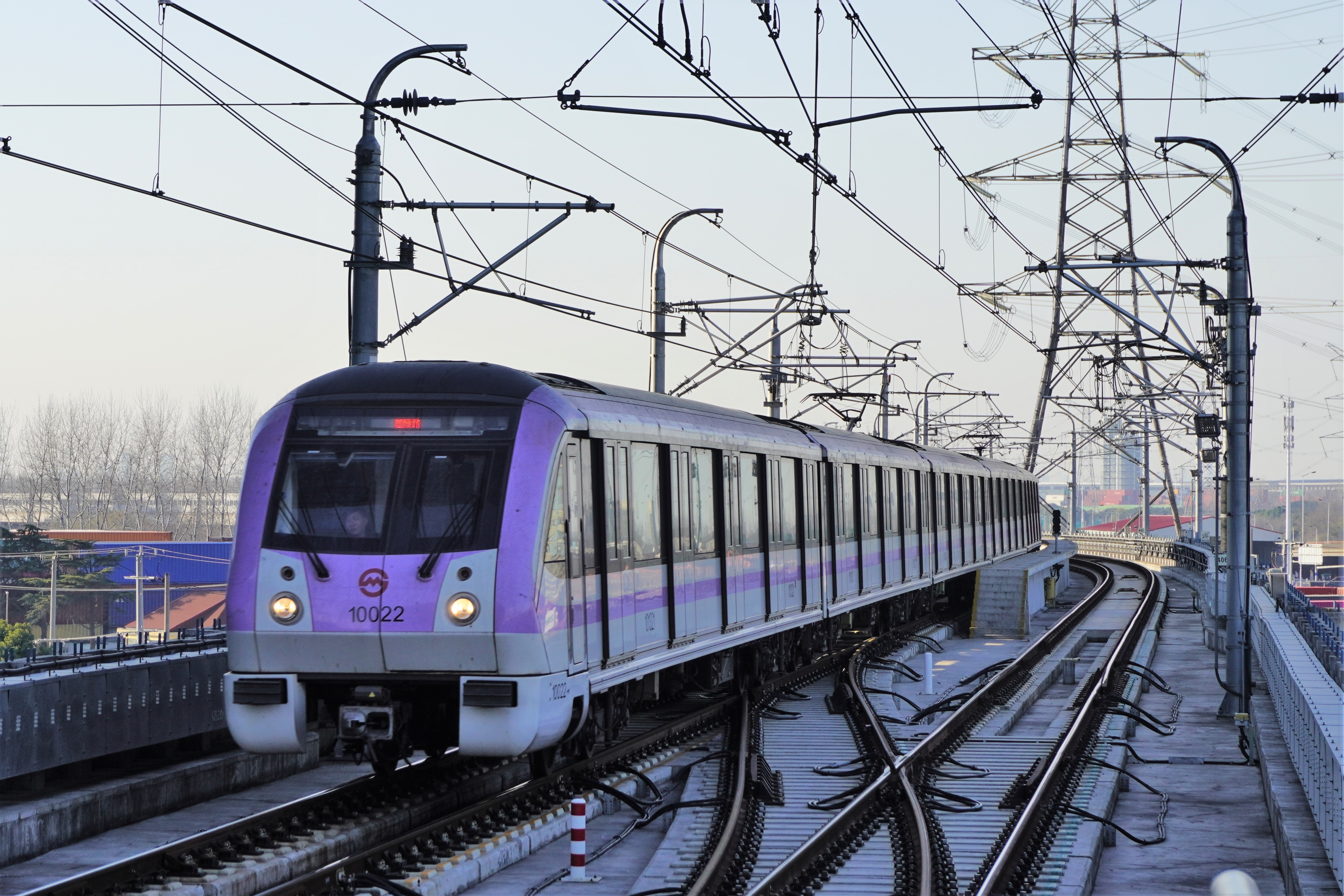
10A01

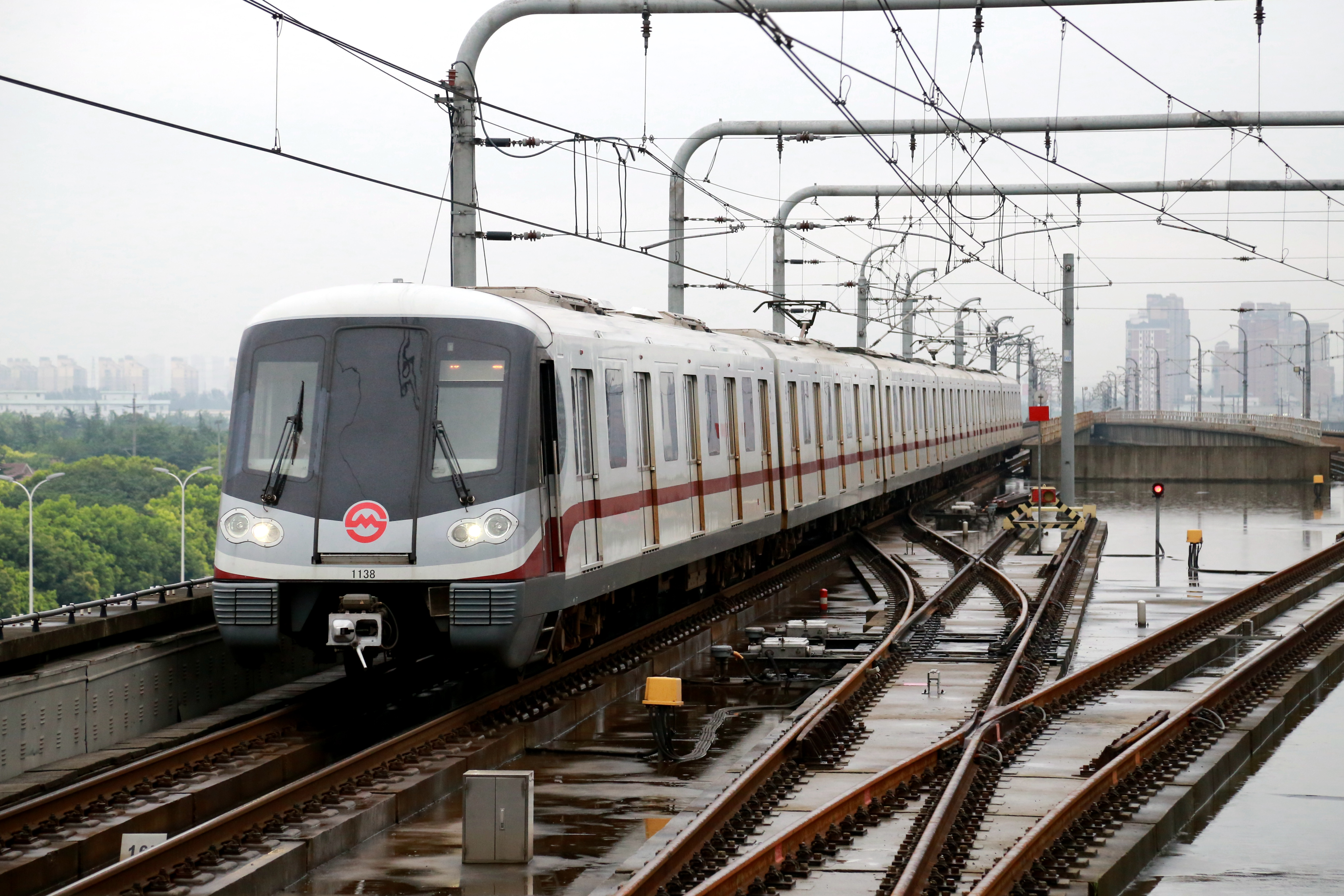
11A01

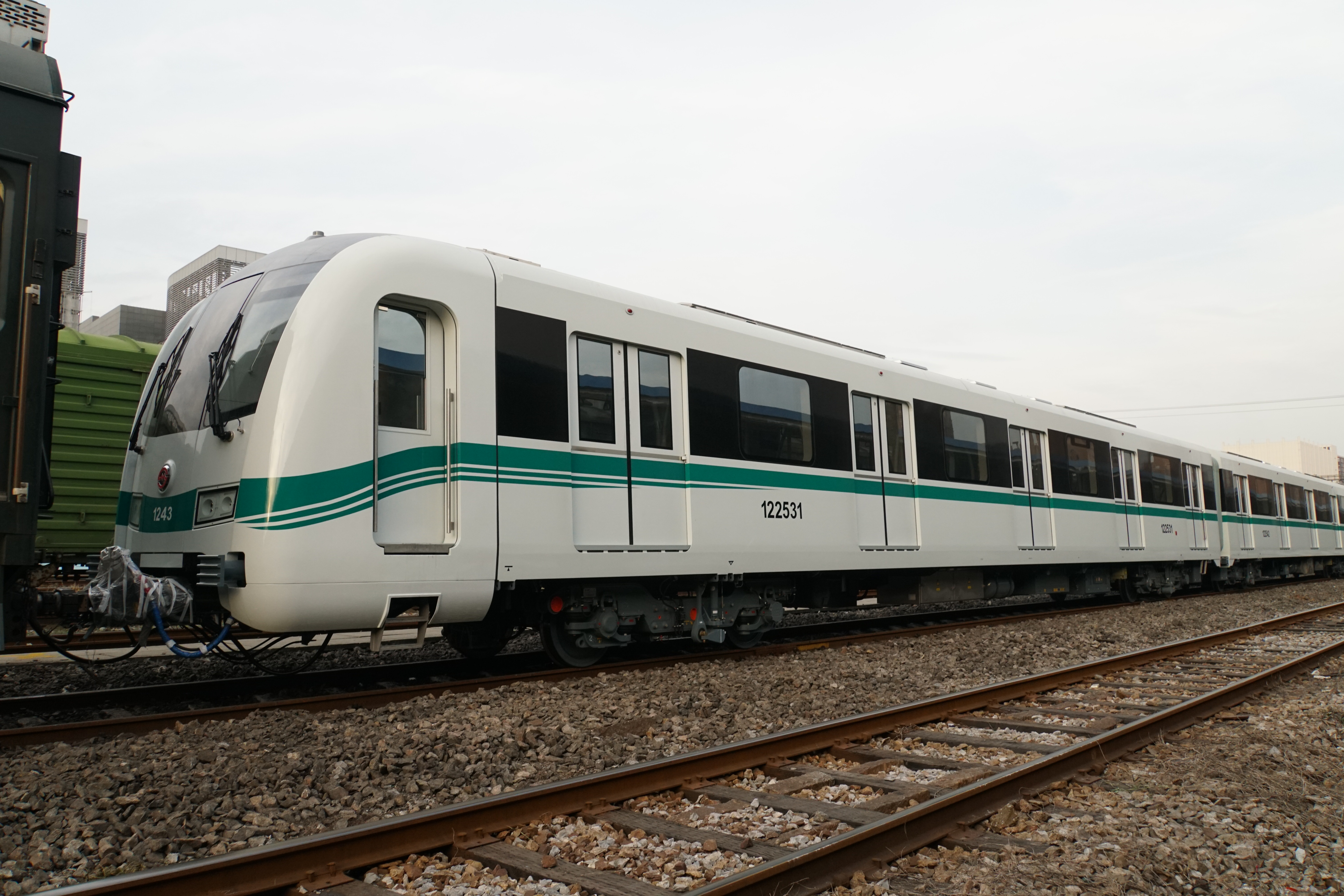
12A02

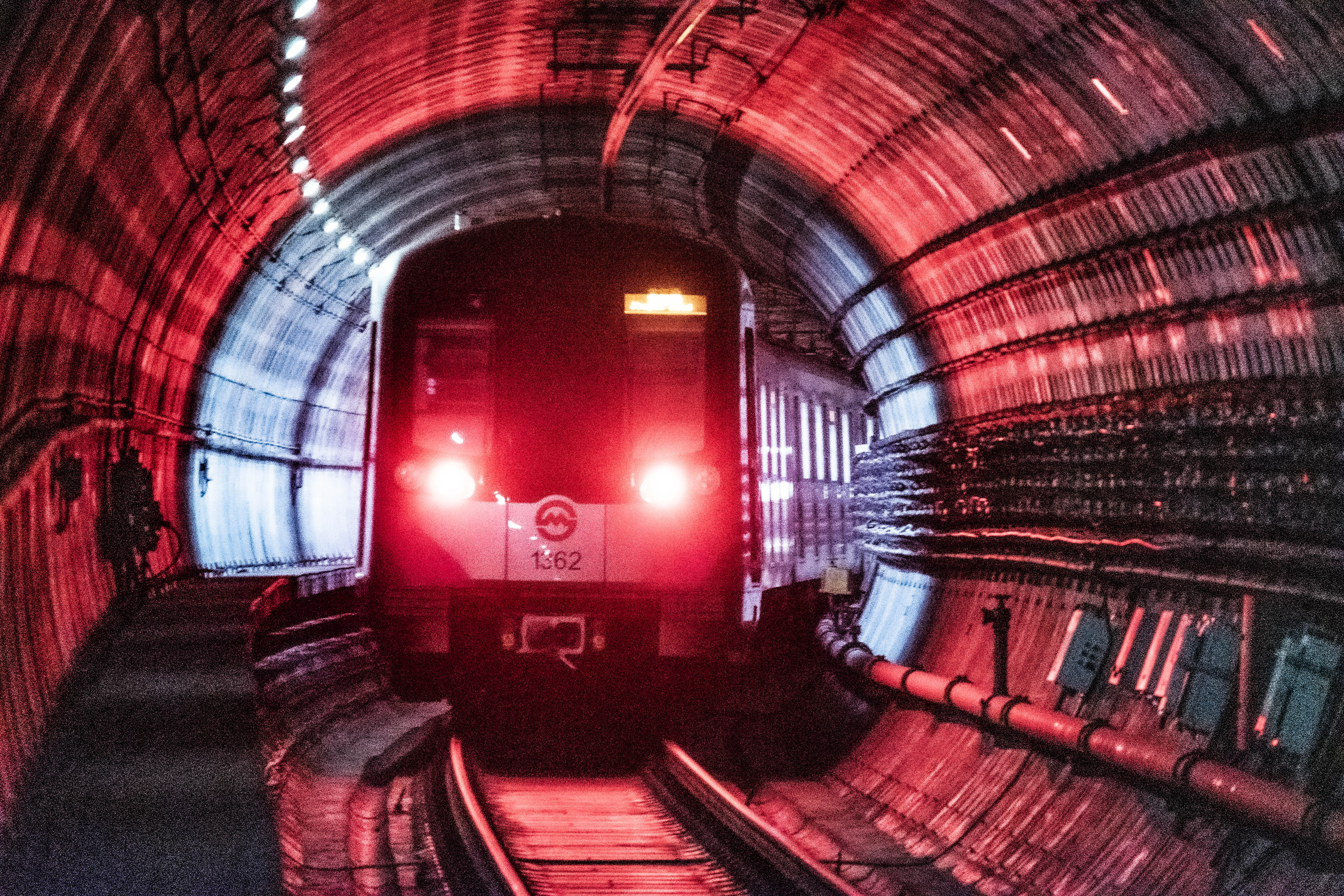
13A02

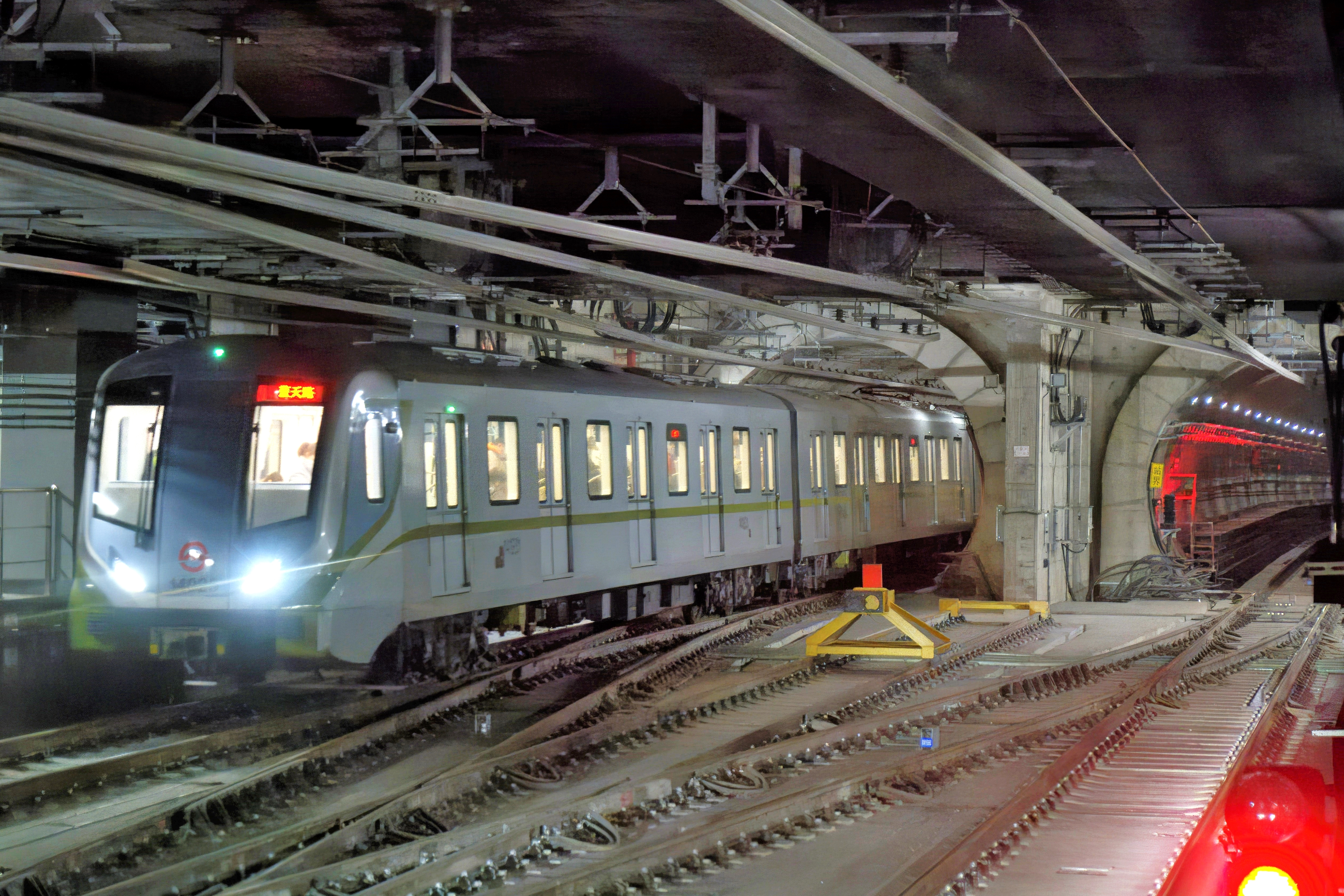
14A01

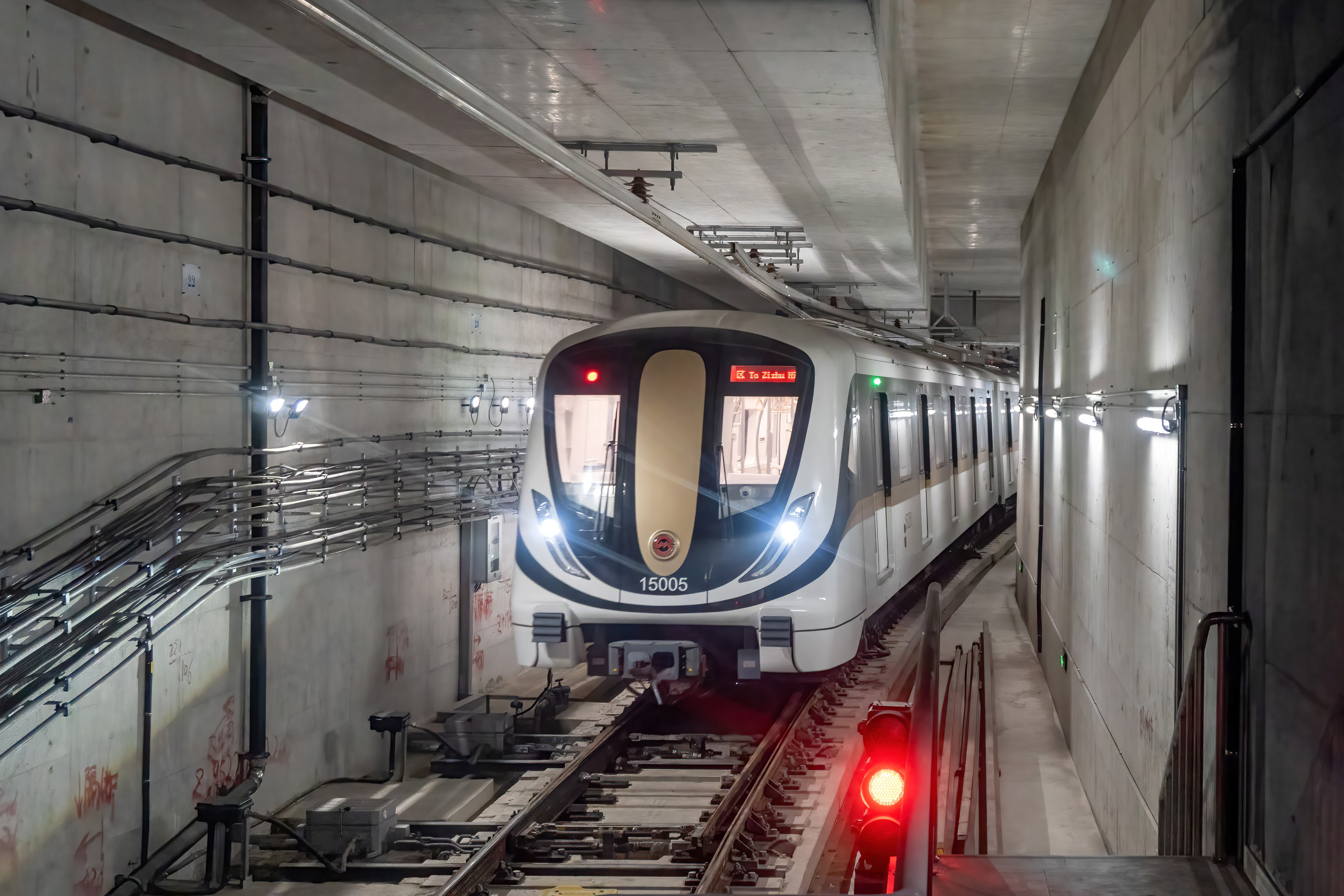
15A01

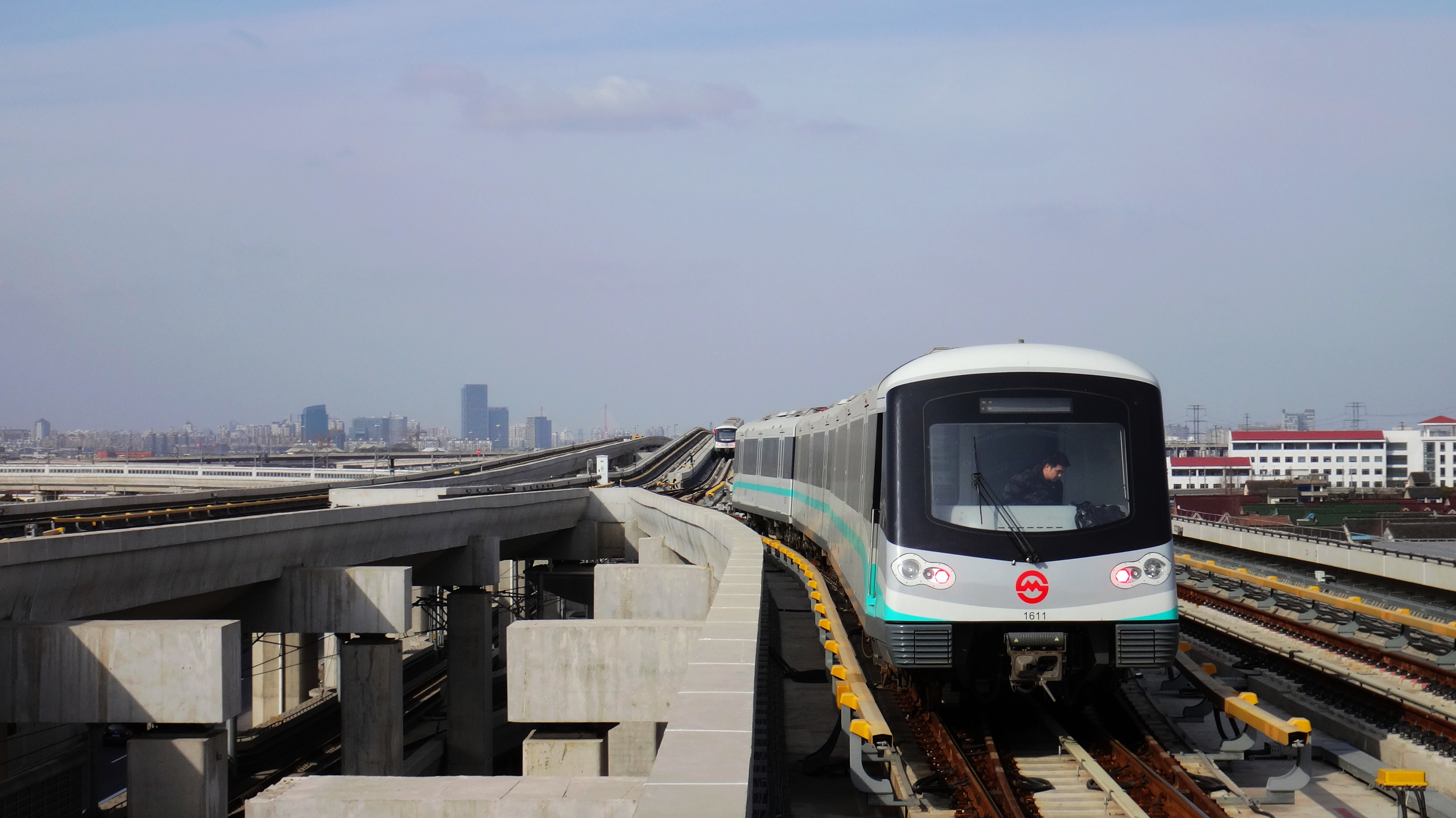
16A01

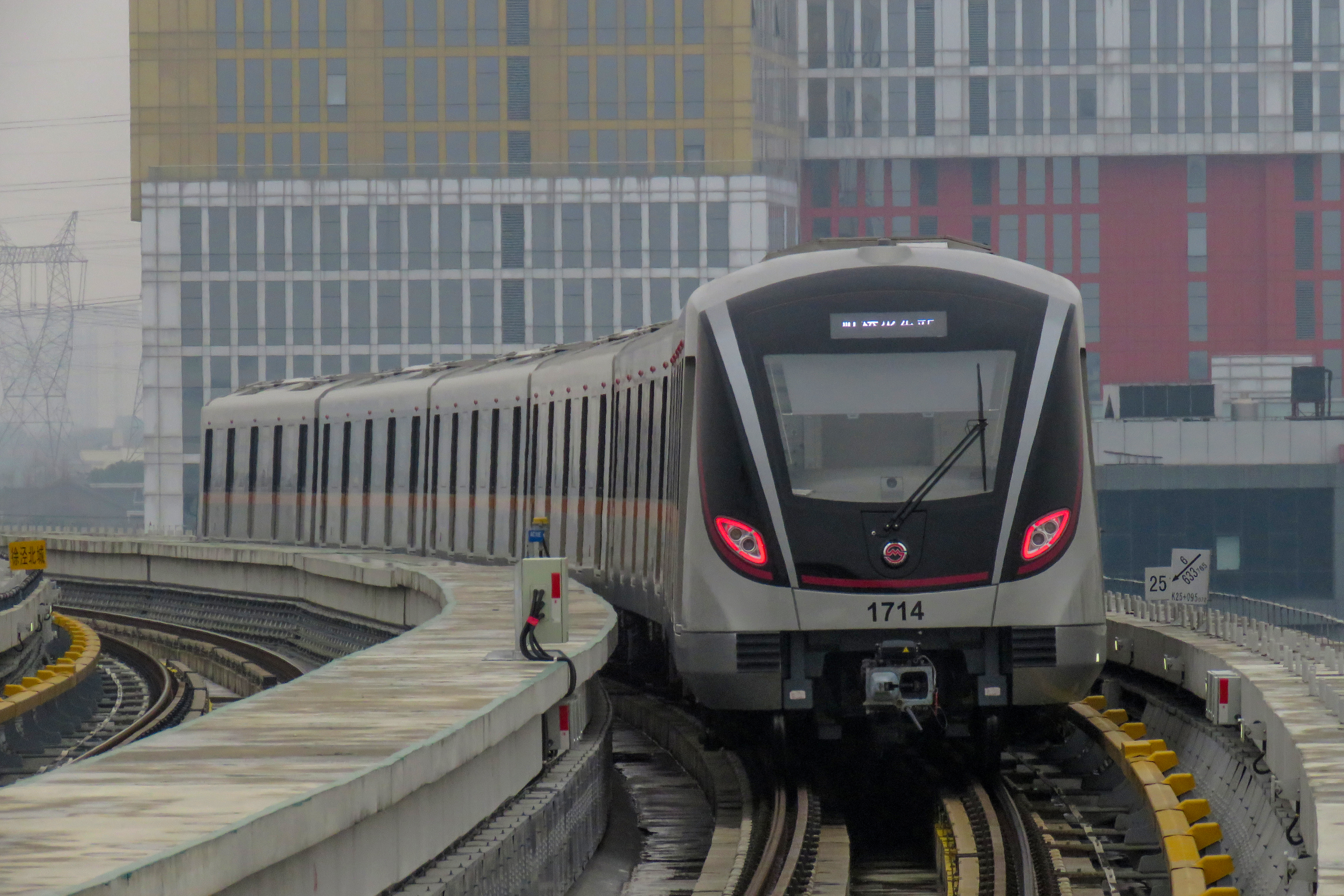
17A01

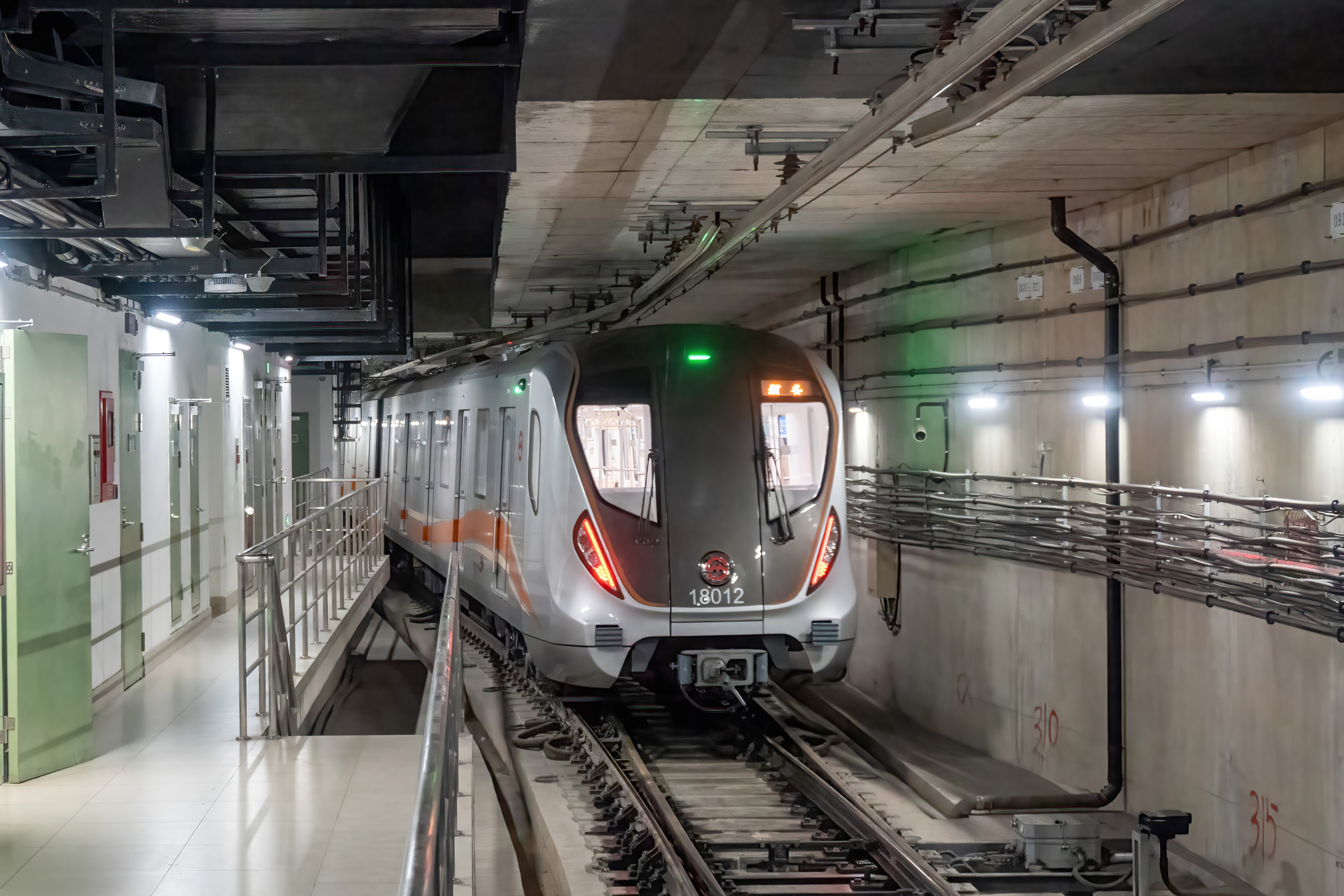
18A01

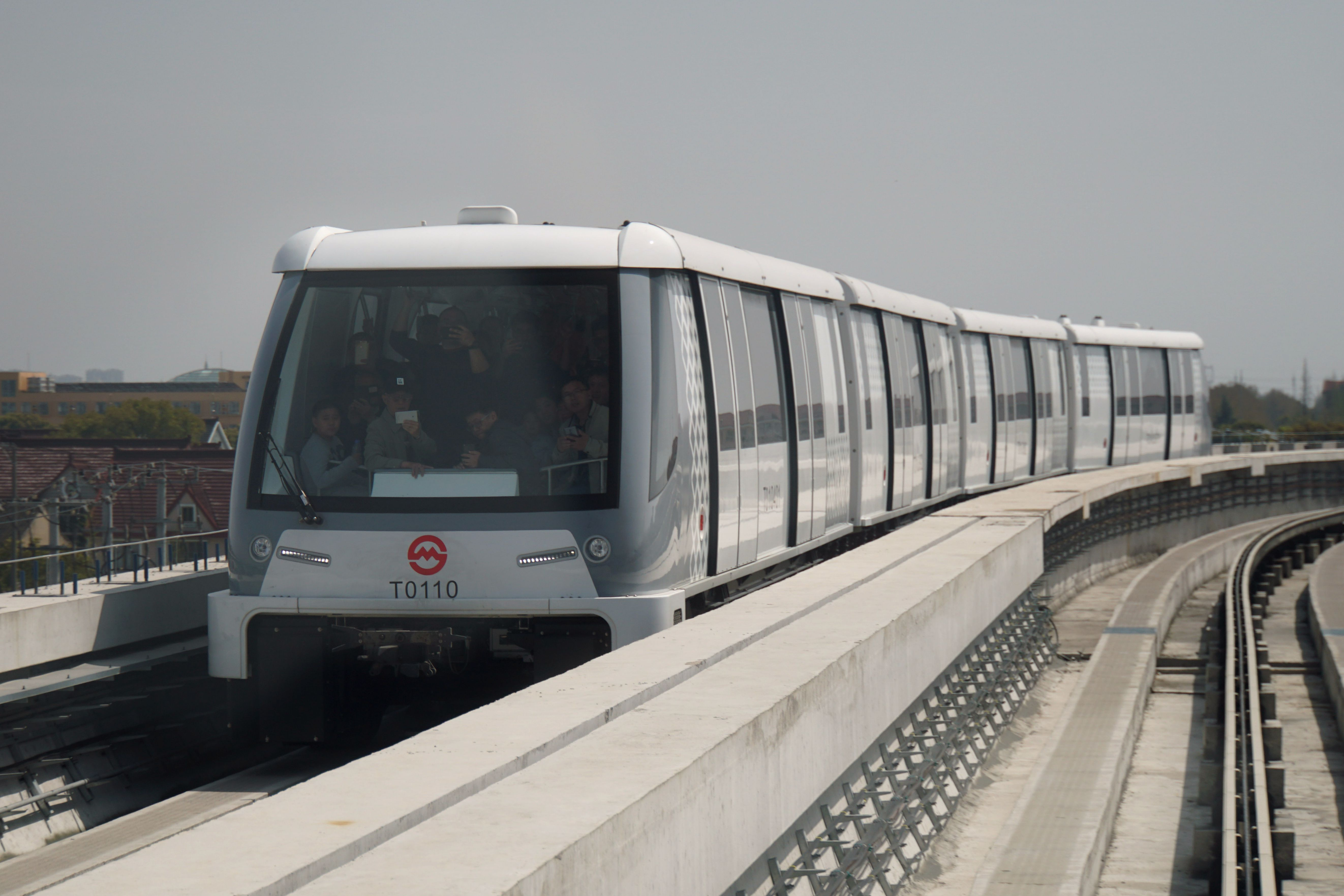
Innovia APM 300

== Current fleet ==
Trains used in the Shanghai metro system
Fleet numbers	Manufacturer	Time of manufac- turing	Class	No of car	Assembly (Note: Tc: Trailer with cab; Mp: EMU with pantograph; M: EMU without pantograph.)	Rolling stock	Number	Line	Notes
128			A (Note: Class A carriage: 21-24m in length, 3.0m in width and 3.8m in height; Capacity: about 310 people.)	8		01A05		Line 1	
128	ADtranz (Note: ADtranz was acquired by Bombardier in May 2001. Subsequently, in January 2021 it was acquired by Alstom.) and Siemens	2000-2001	A	8	Tc+Mp+M+Mp+M+Mp+M+Tc	02A01	201-216 (00071-00781, 01011-01241, 01262-01293, 01322-01353, 01382-01413, 01442-01473, 01502-01533, 01562-01593, 01622-01653 and 01682-01713)	Line 2	Original name: AC02. In 2007, the six carriage 201-216 trainsets were expanded to eight carriage by using the middle carriages from 217-224.
168	Even numbers: SATCO (Note: SATCO (Shanghai Alstom Transportation Equipment Co., Ltd.) is a joint venture between Alstom Metropolis and Shanghai Electric.) (and 0253); Odd numbers: CRRC Nanjing Puzhen Co., Ltd.	2007-2009	A	8	Tc+Mp+M+Mp+M+M+Mp+Tc	02A02	0233-0253 (021291-022961)	Line 2	Original name: AC08.
128	SATCO (0262-0269); CRRC Nanjing Puzhen Co., Ltd. (0254-0261)	2009-2010	A	8	Tc+Mp+M+Mp+M+Mp+Mp+Tc	02A03	0254-0269 (022971-024241)	Line 2	Original name: AC17a. Although the car has 4 pantographs, the sixth pantograph with carriage (Mp car) is generally not used.
128	SATCO; CRRC Nanjing Puzhen Co., Ltd.	2009-2010 2018-2020 (expansion cars)	A	8	Tc+Mp+M+Mp+M+Mp+Mp+Tc	02A04	0270-0285 (024251-025522)	Line 2	Formerly four car trainsets; 4 new carriages plugged in to form an eight car train.
248	CRRC Zhuzhou Locomotive Co., Ltd.	2017-2020	A	8	Tc+Mp+M+Mp+M+M+Mp+Tc	02A05	02086-02116 (025531-027931)	Line 2	
168	Alstom France (301,302); CRRC Nanjing Puzhen Co., Ltd. (303-328)	2001-2004	A	6	Tc+Mp+M+M+Mp+Tc	03A01	301-328 (02011-02301, 03011-03961 and 04011-04421)	Line 3	Original name: AC03.
48	SATCO (0333-0336); CRRC Changchun Railway Vehicles Co., Ltd. (0329-0332)	2014-2017	A	6	Tc+Mp+M+M+Mp+Tc	03A02	0329-0336 (031691-032161)	Line 3	
168	Siemens (0401,0402); CRRC Zhuzhou Locomotive Co., Ltd. (0403–0428)	2004-2007	A	6	Tc+Mp+M+M+Mp+Tc	04A01	0401-0428 (040011-041681)	Line 4	Original name: AC05. In February 2009, 8 trains used on line 2 (numbers: 0225-0232) returned to line 4.
162	SATCO (0430–0455); CRRC Changchun Railway Vehicles Co., Ltd. (0429)	2014-2017	A	6	Tc+Mp+M+M+Mp+Tc	04A02	0429-0455 (041691-043301)	Line 4	13 trains (042171-042941, trainset 0437-0449) have been assigned to line 3.
68	SATCO	2002-2004	C (Note: Class C carriage: 19.44m in length, 2.6m in width and 3.8m in height; Capacity: about 200 people.)	4	Tc+Mp+Mp+Tc	05C01	501-513 and 515-518 (02011-02041, 03011-03401 and 04011-04241.)	Line 5	Original name: AC11. Used on the branchline. Only sets without gangway connection between the carriages.
198	CRRC Changchun Railway Vehicles Co., Ltd.	2017-2019	C	6	Tc+Mp+M+M+Mp+Tc	05C02	0519-0551 (050691-052661)	Line 5	Used on the mainline.
84	SATCO	2007-2009	C	4	Tc+Mp+Mp+Tc	06C01	0601-0603 (060011-060121); 0605-0613 (060131-060481); 0615-0623 (060491-060841)	Line 6	Original name: AC12.
44	CRRC Changchun Railway Vehicles Co., Ltd.	2009-2010	C	4	Tc+Mp+Mp+Tc	06C02	0625-0633 (060851-061201); 0635-0636 (061211-061281)	Line 6	Original name: AC14A.
72	CRRC Changchun Railway Vehicles Co., Ltd.	2011-2012	C	4	Tc+Mp+Mp+Tc	06C03	0637-0643 (061291-061601); 0645-0653 (061611-061921); 0655-0656 (061931-062001)	Line 6	Original name: AC14B.
104	CRRC Changchun Railway Vehicles Co., Ltd.	2018-2020	C	4	Tc+Mp+Mp+Tc	06C04	06057-06082 (062011-063041)	Line 6	
252	Bombardier	2008–2010	A	6	Tc+Mp+M+M+Mp+Tc	07A01	0701-0742 (070011-072521)	Line 7	Original name: AC10. Same as 09A02 and 12A01 (but different painting).
180	CRRC Changchun Railway Vehicles Co., Ltd.	2016-2018	A	6	Tc+Mp+M+M+Mp+Tc	07A02	0743-0772 (072531-074321)	Line 7	Same as 09A03 (but different painting).
42	CRRC Changchun Railway Vehicles Co., Ltd.	2019-2020	A	6	Tc+Mp+M+M+Mp+Tc	07A03	07073-07079 (074331-074741)	Line 7	
168	Alstom France (0801); SATCO (0802-0828)	2006-2008	C	6	Tc+Mp+M+M+Mp+Tc	08C01	0801-0828 (080011-081681)	Line 8	6 cars (080011-080061) built by CAF. Original name: AC07.
126	CRRC Changchun Railway Vehicles Co., Ltd.	2009-2010	C	7	Tc+Mp+M+M+M+Mp+Tc	08C02	0829-0846 (081691-082941)	Line 8	Original name: AC15A.
140	CRRC Changchun Railway Vehicles Co., Ltd.	2010-2011	C	7	Tc+Mp+M+M+M+Mp+Tc	08C03	0847-0866 (082951-083341)	Line 8	Original name: AC15B.
168	CRRC Changchun Railway Vehicles Co., Ltd.	2018-2020	C	7	Tc+Mp+M+M+M+Mp+Tc	08C04	08067-08090 (083351-085301)	Line 8	
60	Bombardier Movia 456	2004–2005	A	6	Tc+Mp+M+M+Mp+Tc	09A01	0901-0910 (090011-090601)	Line 9	Seconded from line 1. Original name: AC04.; former number 011751-012341.
246	Bombardier Movia 456	2008–2010	A	6	Tc+Mp+M+M+Mp+Tc	09A02	0911-0951 (090611-093061)	Line 9	5 trains (numbers 0942–0945, 0948) used on the Expo line (trainset number 1301-1305) for the World Expo in 2010, returned to line 9 afterwards. Original name: AC09. Same as 07A01 and 12A01 (but different painting).
216	Bombardier Movia 456	2016–2018	A	6	Tc+Mp+M+M+Mp+Tc	09A03	0953-0988 (093131-095281)	Line 9	Same as 07A02 (but different painting).
102	CRRC Changchun Railway Vehicles Co., Ltd.	2018–2020	A	6	Tc+Mp+M+M+Mp+Tc	09A04	09089-09105 (095291-096301)	Line 9	
246	Odd numbers: SATCO; Even numbers: Nanjing Puzhen Rolling Stock Co., Ltd.	2009-2010	A	6	Tc+Mp+M+M+Mp+Tc	10A01	1001-1041 (100011-102461)	Line 10	Between 26 December 2020 and the spring of 2022 the operator cabs have the wall of driver cab removed. Original name: AC13. 100251 and 100961 wrecked on September 27, 2011. They were repaired and returned to service.
104	Odd numbers: SATCO; Even numbers: Nanjing Puzhen Rolling Stock Co., Ltd.	2017-2019	A	6	Tc+Mp+M+M+Mp+Tc	10A02	10042-10067 (102471-104021)	Line 10	
396	CRRC Zhuzhou Locomotive Co., Ltd.	2008-2011	A	6	Tc+Mp+M+M+Mp+Tc	11A01	1101-1166 (110011-113961)	Line 11	Some of the trains are Disney-themed, and their inside and outside are packaged with Disney cartoon elements. Original name: AC16.
36	CRRC Changchun Railway Vehicles Co., Ltd.	2015-2016	A	6	Tc+Mp+M+M+Mp+Tc	11A02	1167-1172 (113971-114321)	Line 11	
62	CRRC Zhuzhou Locomotive Co., Ltd.	2015-2016; 2025	A	6	Tc+Mp+M+M+Mp+Tc	11A03	1173-1182 (114331-114921)	Line 11	
246	Bombardier Movia 456	2011-2013	A	6	Tc+Mp+M+M+Mp+Tc	12A01	1201-1241 (120011-122461)	Line 12	Original name: AC09B. Same as 07A01 and 09A02 (but different painting).
90	Bombardier Movia 456	2017-2018	A	6	Tc+Mp+M+M+Mp+Tc	12A02	1242-1256 (122471-123361)	Line 12	
114	CRRC Changchun Railway Vehicles Co., Ltd.	2018-2020	A	6	Tc+Mp+M+M+Mp+Tc	12A03	12057-12075 (123371-124501)	Line 12	USB charging ports (concealed design).
144	CRRC Nanjing Puzhen Co., Ltd.	2011-2014	A	6	Tc+Mp+M+M+Mp+Tc	13A01	1301-1324 (130011-131441)	Line 13	Original name: AC18.
228	CRRC Nanjing Puzhen Co., Ltd.	2016-2018	A	6	Tc+Mp+M+M+Mp+Tc	13A02	1325-1362 (131451-133721)	Line 13	
114	CRRC Nanjing Puzhen Co., Ltd.	2024-2026	A	6	Tc+Mp+M+M+Mp+Tc	13A03	13063-13071; 13083-13092 (133731-134261, 134931-135521)		
392	CRRC Nanjing Puzhen Co., Ltd.	2019–2020	A	8	Tc+Mp+M+Mp+M+M+Mp+Tc	14A01	14001-14049 (140011-143921)	Line 14	
324	SATCO and CRRC Changchun Railway Vehicles	2019-2020	A	6	Tc+MP+M+M+MP+Tc	15A01	15001-15054 (150011-153241)	Line 15	Front of the train adopts an open driver's cab.
138	Siemens and CRRC Zhuzhou Locomotive Co., Ltd.	2012–2014	A (Note: Class A trains for Line 16: 23.54 meters long, 3 meters wide, 3.0m in width and 3.8m in height; only three doors on each side per carriage instead of five for standard Class A carriages.)	3	Mcp+M+Mcp=Mcp+M+Mcp	16A01	1601–1646 (160011–161381)	Line 16	Original name: AC19. Formerly three carriage trains; two trains have been coupled (may decouple in trough hours) to form a six carriage train. Horizontal rows and reversible seats.
90	CRRC Zhuzhou Locomotive Co., Ltd.	2018–2020	A	6	Tc+Mp+M+M+Mp+Tc	16A02	16047–16061 (161391–162281)	Line 16	USB charging port. Carriages 1, 2, 5, and 6 use tandem seats, while carriages 3 and 4 use horizontal seats. (Note: 16A02 are able to take 200 more passengers than the 16A01 because of different seating arrangements. A six carriage train has a capacity of 2,378 passengers, 120% more than trains with three carriages.)

=== Refurbishment and improvements ===
01A02 – The older cars have been renovated during the 2008–2009 expansion program, which included replacing train doors with electric doors from pneumatic doors, changing the lampshades of the internal lights from grids to white plastic shells, and adding new electronic destination displays. As the older cars are about to reached the end of their life, they will receive another refurbishment. Renovation extends their lifespans for an additional 14 years.

02A01 – All cars have been modernized between 2023 and 2024. Their signalling systems are upgraded, with the replacing pneumatic doors to electric doors.

03A01 – The trains will have a major renovation. This includes redesigning a different style livery of red, yellow and white on bodies and trains' front. The trains will also receive a new passenger information systems, including LCD signs displaying train destination, the next station, route map, and the time. The signalling system will be upgraded. Traction systems will be changed from ONIX 1500 to OptONIX STD 1500. The lifespan of trains will be extended from 35 years to at least 50 years.

== Former fleet ==
=== Surplus cars and retired cars ===
The surplus cars are older 92113, older 98033 and older 98042. Older 92113 being damaged in a test run in Tonghe Xincun station in 2004. 98033 and 98042 were severely damaged in 2009 Shanghai Railway Station station crash.Three new cars built by CRRC Zhuzhou Locomotive replaced them in 2007 and 2011. 98042 was converted to the SMTC Experimental Car in 2014. All of useful parts on 92113 and 98033 have been cannibalised for other carriages, so they are no longer be used.

=== Cars not in service ===
01A01 – 56 cars are out of service due to age. Some of them have structural issues.

09ASY – This stock was built for experimental purposes. Cars 093071–093121 (set 0952) are no longer in service since 2010 and converted into a training train in 2011. Stored at Longyang Road Depot.

11A03 – Cars 114381 and 114372 were significantly damaged on 22 December 2024. They were moved to the shop of Shanghai Circuit Depot with cars 114331–114363 from the crash site for inspection.

== Depots and yards ==
Shanghai Metro system has 13 depots and 15 yards.

- 1 Meilong Depot (Chinese: 梅陇车辆段): Located near Jinjiang Amusement Park, Minhang District, Xuhui District, on the south side of the segment between Shanghai South Railway Station and Jinjiang Park, it is the first depot constructed in Shanghai; used for the parking and maintenance. Also undertakes advanced maintenance and overhaul of other trains in Shanghai Metro. There is a connection line with Shanghai-Kunming Railway.
- 1 Fujin Road Yard (富锦路停车场): Located on the west side of Yunchuan Road, Fujin Road, Baoshan District, and northwest of terminal station Fujin Road used for parking and maintenance. It was officially completed on December 18, 2007. The yard can park 54 8-carriage metro trains at the same time, covering an area of about 30 hectares (at the time the largest metro yard in Asia).
- 2 7 Longyang Road Depot (龙阳路车辆段): Located in the southeast of Longyang Road, Luoshan Road; northeast of Longyang Road, southeast of Huamu Road. It is used for parking and maintenance. There is a connection line between lines 2 and 7.
- 2 Chuansha Yard (川沙停车场): Located between Chuansha Dongheng Port and Shajiao River, northeast of Yuandong Avenue, covering an area of about 12.6 hectares; used for parking and maintenance of line 2 trains.
- 2 13 Beidi Road Depot (北翟路车辆段): Located on the north side of Hongqiao transportation hub near Jingli West Road, north of Beidi Road, west of S20, south of Wusong River and east of Xupu Port; to the northwest of Songhong Road and the southeast of West Jinshajiang Road. It was put in operations in 2009 and currently used for the parking and maintenance of line 2 and line 13 trains. There is a connection line between lines 2 and 13.
- 3 Shilong Road Yard (石龙路停车场): Located on the east side of Longwu Road, Shilong Road, Xuhui District; on the south side of the segment between Shanghai South Railway Station and Shilong Road. It is currently used for the parking and maintenance of line 3 trains and has a connection line with the Shanghai-Kunming Railway.
- 3 North Jiangyang Road Depot (江杨北路车辆段) (sometimes referred as Baogang Depot): Located on the east side of Fujin Road, North Jiangyang Road, Baoshan District, and southeast of terminal station North Jiangyang Road; used for parking and maintenance of line 3 trains. Also undertakes advanced maintenance work for line 4 trains.
- 4 Puhuitang Yard (蒲汇塘停车场): Located on the east side of Guilin Road, Wuzhong Road, Xuhui District; on the west side of Shanghai Indoor Stadium, southwest of Yishan Road Station; used for parking and maintenance of line 4 trains.
- 5 Pingzhuang Highway Depot: Located on the southwest side of Jinhai Road intersection of Pingzhuang Highway, Fengxian District; south of the terminal station Fengxian Xincheng. It is used for parking and maintenance.
- 5 Jianchuan Road Depot (剑川路车辆段): Located on the west side of Jianchuan Road, Humin Road, northwest of northeast of Jianchuan Road; used for parking and maintenance of line 5 trains, and has a connection line with Wujing branch line, a freight branch of the Shanghai-Kunming line.
- 5 Xinzhuang Yard (莘庄停车场): Located in the east of Xinzhuang and has a connection line with line 1.
- 6 10 Gangcheng Road Depot (港城路车辆段): Located on the northwest side of Gangcheng Road; used for parking and maintenance of line 6 and 10 trains. There is a connection line between lines 6 and 10.
- 6 Sanlin Yard (三林停车场): Located in the northeast of West Huaxia Road and southeast of Gaoqing Road; used for parking and maintenance of line 6 trains. It was originally scheduled to be used for the parking and maintenance of line 11 trains, but this was cancelled due to the adjustment of the north-south dividing point of line 11 (now Chuanyanghe Yard is in use of line 11).
- 7 15 Jinqiu Road Yard (锦秋路停车场): Located west of Qihua Road on Jinqiu Road to the south of Hizaobang and east of the outer ring line; used for parking and maintenance for line 7 and 15 trains. Chentai Road parking lot and Xincun Road control center are shared with other lines of Shanghai Metro. There is a connection line between line 7 and 15.
- 8 Yinhang Depot (殷行车辆段): Located on the north side of terminal station Shiguang Road, Yinhang City; used for parking and maintenance of line 8 trains. It has a connection line with the railway Nanhe branch line.
- 8 Pujiang Pujiang Town Yard (浦江镇停车场): Located on the east side of Shanghai Puxing Highway, the north side of Shenjiahu Highway, the west side of Sanlu Highway, and southeast Shendu Highway (south of Pujiang line); used for parking and maintenance of line 8 and Pujiang trains.
- 9 Jiuting Depot (九亭车辆段): Located on the north side of Zhongchun Road, Husong Road, northeast of Zhongchun Road and there is an inbound and outbound line between Zhongchun Road and Jiuting; used for the parking and maintenance of line 9 trains. Although it is close to Shanghai-Hangzhou Railway, there is no connection line and new trains need to be transported into the depot using a flatbed truck.
- 9 12 14 Jinqiao Yard (金桥停车场): Located on the south side of Jinhai Road and on the east side of Jinsui Road, on the south side of Jinji Road. There is an inbound and outbound line at Jinji Road. It is used for parking and maintenance of line 9, 12 and 14 trains. There is a connection line between lines 9, 12, and 14.
- 10 Wuzhong Road Yard (吴中路停车场): Located near the outer ring line of Wuzhong Road, south of Ziteng Road. Covering an area of about 23.4 hectares. Used for parking and maintenance of line 10 trains. The parking lot has been built as an open-top project "Shanghai New Speed Metro Dynamic Museum", which is the current Shanghai Metro Museum.
- 11 Chengbei Road Yard (城北路停车场): Located in the middle of Chengbei Road, Shengzhu Road, Pingcheng Road and Jiatang Road, across Chenjiashan Road, northeast of North Jiading. Used for parking and maintenance of line 11 trains.
- 11 13 16 Chuanyanghe Yard (川杨河停车场): Located northeast of Luoshan Road, southeast of Middle Huaxia Road and south of the Maglev . Used for parking and maintenance of line 11, 13 and 16 trains. There is a connection line between lines 11, 13 and 16.
- 11 Shanghai Circuit Depot (赛车场车辆段): Located on the opposite side of Shanghai Circuit, at the northwest corner of the Shanghai Circuit. It covers an area of about 26.67 hectares and is used for the parking and maintenance of line 11 trains.
- 12 Zhongchun Road Yard (中春路停车场): Located on the northwest side of the intersection of Gudai Road and the Shanghai-Hangzhou Railway and on the west side of terminal station Qixin Road, covering an area of 13.35 hectares. It is the parking lot for line 12 trains. There is a connection line with the Shanghai-Hangzhou Railway.
- 14 Fengbang Depot (封浜车辆段): Located in the area west of Fengbang River, south of Cao'an Road, west of railway line, and north of G2 expressway.
- 15 Yuanjiang Road Depot: Located to the west of Lianhua South Road and north of Zhuanxing East Road.
- 16 Yebei Depot (治北车辆段): Located to the southeast of East Huinan. Used for the parking and maintenance of line 16 trains. It is planned to also be used for the parking and maintenance of line 2 trains. There is a track with both the catenary and third rail at the entrance and exit of the depot for trains to switch over as line 16 uses third rail for power supply on the main line and catenary for power supply in the depot. Also the test line in the depot is also equipped with a catenary and a third rail.
- 17 Xujing Depot (徐泾车辆段): Located on the south side of Songze Avenue and on the east side of Xule Road;
- 17 Zhujiajiao Yard (朱家角停车场): Located on the south of Huqingping Highway and Huqingping Expressway North side.
- 18 Hetao Road Depot (航头定修段): Located on the west side of Hetao Road.
