= CRRC Nanjing Puzhen =

Puzhen-based train company

CRRC Nanjing Puzhen Rolling Stock Co., Ltd.
- Native name: 中车南京浦镇车辆有限公司
- Formerly: CSR Nanjing Puzhen Co., Ltd. (1908–2015)
- Type: Subsidiary
- Industry: Railway – rolling stock
- Founded: 1908
- Headquarters: Nanjing, Jiangsu, China
- Parent: CSR Corporation Limited (1908–2015); CRRC (2015–)
- Divisions: in Hangzhou, Changzhou, Hefei, Suzhou
- Subsidiaries: CRRC Guangdong Co., Ltd.
- Website: crrcgc.cc/pz

CRRC Nanjing Puzhen Rolling Stock Co., Ltd.
- Simplified Chinese: 中车南京浦镇车辆有限公司
- Traditional Chinese: 中車南京浦鎮車輛有限公司
Transcriptions

CRRC Puzhen
- Simplified Chinese: 中车浦镇
- Traditional Chinese: 中車浦鎮
Transcriptions

CRRC Nanjing Puzhen Rolling Stock Co., Ltd. (Chinese: 中车南京浦镇车辆有限公司) is a Chinese railway rolling stock manufacturer, based in Puzhen, Nanjing city. It is a subsidiary of CRRC. Nanjing Puzhen has supplied trains to Shanghai Metro Line 3 and Nanjing Metro in partnership with Alstom.

India's Mumbai Metro One Private Limited (MMOPL) is also using rolling stock manufactured by Nanjing Puzhen. In May 2008, Nanjing Puzhen constructed 16 trains of 4 cars each for the Line 1 of Mumbai Metro, for a total fee of ₹6 billion (US$62.3 million).

Currently Puzhen is delivering 58 4-car trains to Siemens for the Klang Valley Mass Rapid Transit Project in Kuala Lumpur, Malaysia.

Puzhen delivered 20 Diesel Railcars with Voith-Powerpacks to Tunisian State Railways.

The company will supply Dongguan Rail Transit with their rolling stock.

== Joint ventures ==
- Nabtesco (Japan) for braking systems of high speed train
- Faiveley Transport (France) for braking systems of metro cars
- NTN (Japan) for railway bearings
- Midas (Singapore) for metro cars
- Alstom (France) for railway propulsion systems, Innovia APM and Innovia Monorail systems

== Products ==
=== Inter city commuter ===
- CRH6 (co-manufactured with CRRC Qingdao Sifang, final assembly at Jiangmen factory)

=== Metro ===
==== China ====
- Changzhou Metro
- Dongguan Rail Transit, line 2 (licensed from Bombardier Transportation)
- Guiyang Urban Rail Transit
- Hangzhou Metro line 2, 4, 6
- Hefei Metro line 1, 2
- MTR-operated lines in mainland China
  - Shenzhen Metro Line 4 PM0J cars
  - Hangzhou Metro Line 1 PM0G, PM121 and PM144 cars
- Nanjing Metro line 1, 2, 3, 4, 5, 6, 7, 9, 10, S1, S3, S6, S7, S8, S9
- Shanghai Metro
  - 13A01, 13A02 and 14A01
  - 01A05, 02A02, 02A03, 02A04, 10A01 and 10A02 licensed from Alstom
- Shenzhen Metro line 3, 4, 6, 6B, 12
- Suzhou Metro line 1, 2, 3 and 4
- Wuxi Metro line 2
- Xuzhou Metro

==== Export ====
- MRT SBK line, Kuala Lumpur, Malaysia – Inspiro (licensed from Siemens)
- Mumbai Metro Line 1, India
- Noida-Greater Noida Metro, India
- Yellow Line (Namma Metro), Namma Metro, Bangalore, India
- TMB Barcelona Series 7000 & 8000, Spain (Only assist on designing. Materials production and assembly were by Alstom)

=== AGT ===
- Bukit Panjang LRT line, Singapore – C801B (licensed from Alstom, initially Bombardier)
- BTS Gold Line APM, Bangkok, Thailand (licensed from Alstom, initially Bombardier)

=== Monorail ===
- MRT Yellow Line Monorail & Pink Line Monorail, Bangkok, Thailand (licensed from Alstom, initially Bombardier)
- Khon Kaen Transit System, Thailand
- São Paulo Metro Line 15, São Paulo, Brazil (licensed by Alstom, initially Bombardier)

=== Tram/Light Rail ===
- MTR Light Rail, Hong Kong – Phase IV (licensed from UGL Rail) and V LRVs
- Suzhou Tram (licensed from Bombardier Transportation)
