= Shanghai Metro AC09 and AC10 =

Shanghai Metro rolling stock

Shanghai Metro 07A01/09A02/12A01 AC09A/AC09B/AC10
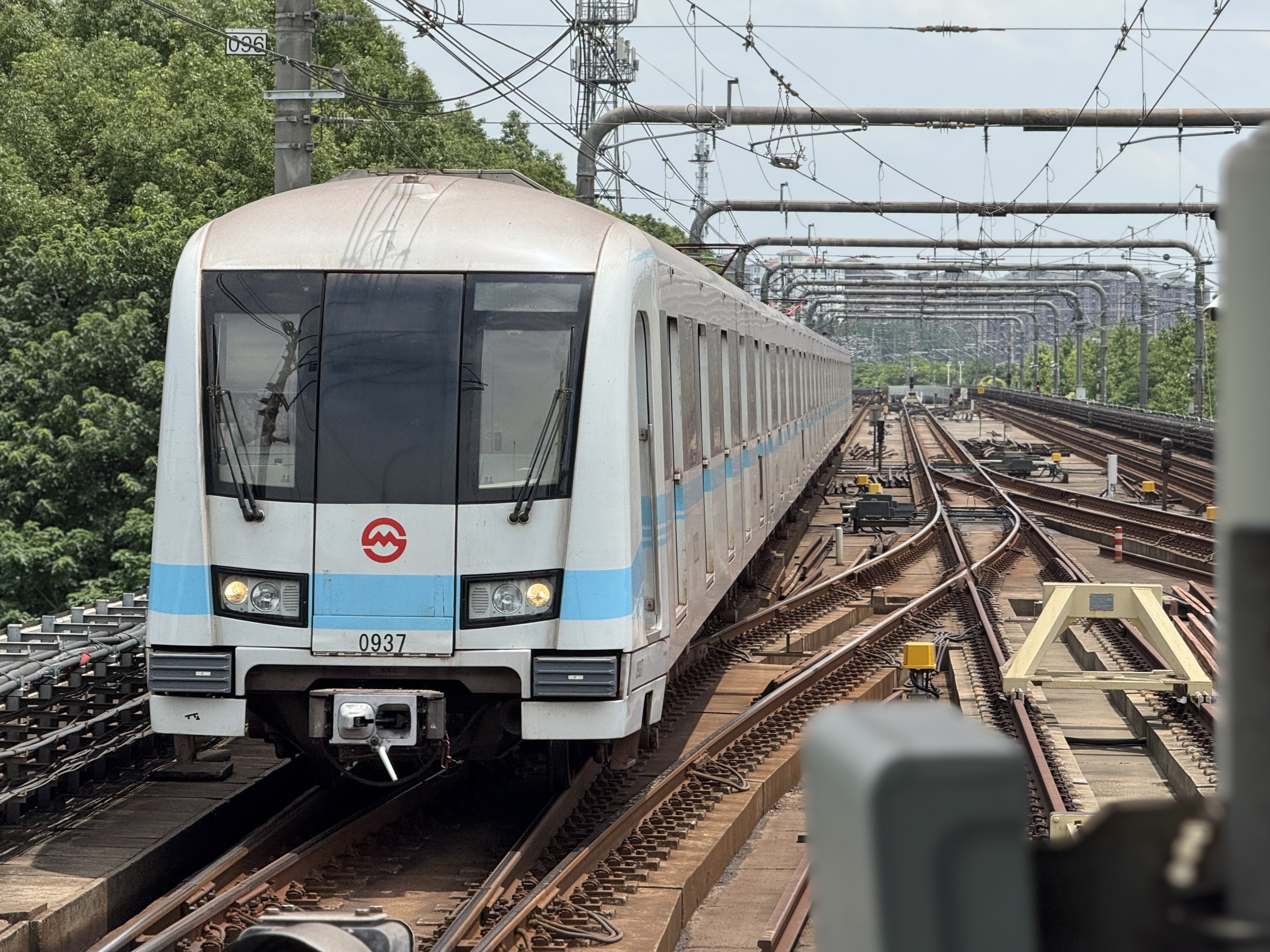
- Set 0937 entering Sheshan station in 2025
- Stock type: Class A EMU
- In service: 28 November 2008-present
- Manufacturer: Changchun Bombardier Railway Vehicles
- Designer: TRICON Design
- Built at: Changchun, China
- Family name: MOVIA
- Constructed: 2008-2013
- Entered service: 28 November 2008
- Number built: 744
- Number in service: 744
- Formation: Tc-Mp-M+M-Mp-Tc
- Fleet numbers: 070011-072461, 090611-093061 and 120011-122461
- Capacity: 310 per car
- Operators: Shentong Metro Group
- Depots: Chentai Road Depot; Longyang Road Yard; Jiuting Depot; Jinqiao Yard; Zhongchun Road Yard
- Lines served: 7 9 12

Specifications
- Car body construction: Aluminum alloy
- Train length: 139.98 m (459 ft 3 in)
- Car length: 24.39 m (80 ft 0 in) (Tc); 22.8 m (74 ft 10 in) (M/Mp)
- Width: 3 m (9 ft 10 in)
- Height: 3.8 m (12 ft 6 in)
- Doors: Electric doors
- Maximum speed: 80 km/h (50 mph)
- Traction system: Bombardier MITRAC TC1110 IGBT-VVVF
- Traction motors: Bombardier MJC-250-1 3-phase AC induction motor
- Electric system(s): 1,500 V DC
- Current collection: Single-arm Pantograph
- UIC classification: 2′2′+Bo′Bo′+Bo′Bo′+Bo′Bo′+Bo′Bo′+2′2′
- Bogies: CNR Changchun Railway Vehicles CW4000D (powered), CW4000 (trailer)
- Safety system(s): Thales SelTrac (CBTC, ATO/GoA2); 12A01: CASCO Urbalis 888 (CBTC, ATO/GoA2)
- Track gauge: 1,435 mm (4 ft 8 1/2 in) standard gauge

The 07A01, 09A02 and the 12A01 (formerly known as AC09 and AC10) are a class of electric multiple unit currently used on Line 7, Line 9 and Line 12 of Shanghai Metro. They were first entered service in November 2008 on Line 9.

In 2014, AC10 renamed 07A01, AC09A renamed 09A02 and AC09B renamed 12A01.

== Overview ==
The contract includes a total of 124 six-car trains and divided into three type of stocks: AC09A for Line 9, AC09B for Line 12 and AC10 for Line 7. All AC09 and AC10 trains are designed by Bombardier and built by CNR Changchun Railway Vehicles.

=== AC09A ===
The AC09A (currently known as 09A02) are assigned for Line 9 service. The trains have livery in white and light blue. During the Expo 2010, five AC09A trains were temporarily assigned to Line 13 and ran Madang Road station - Shibo Avenue station shuttle service.

=== AC09B ===
The AC09B (currently known as 12A01) are assigned for Line 12 service. The trains have livery in white and dark green. AC09Bs feature electronic strip maps to show the stations, route and transfers of Line 12. Some of windows on every car have a LED display to show the train service's terminal station.

AC09B and AC19 are the last rolling stocks formerly named with "AC-series" of Shanghai Metro.

=== AC10 ===
The AC10 (currently known as 07A01) are assigned for Line 7 service. The trains have livery in white and orange. Before the entering service, two delivered AC10 trains' head were featured an Expo 2010's logo.

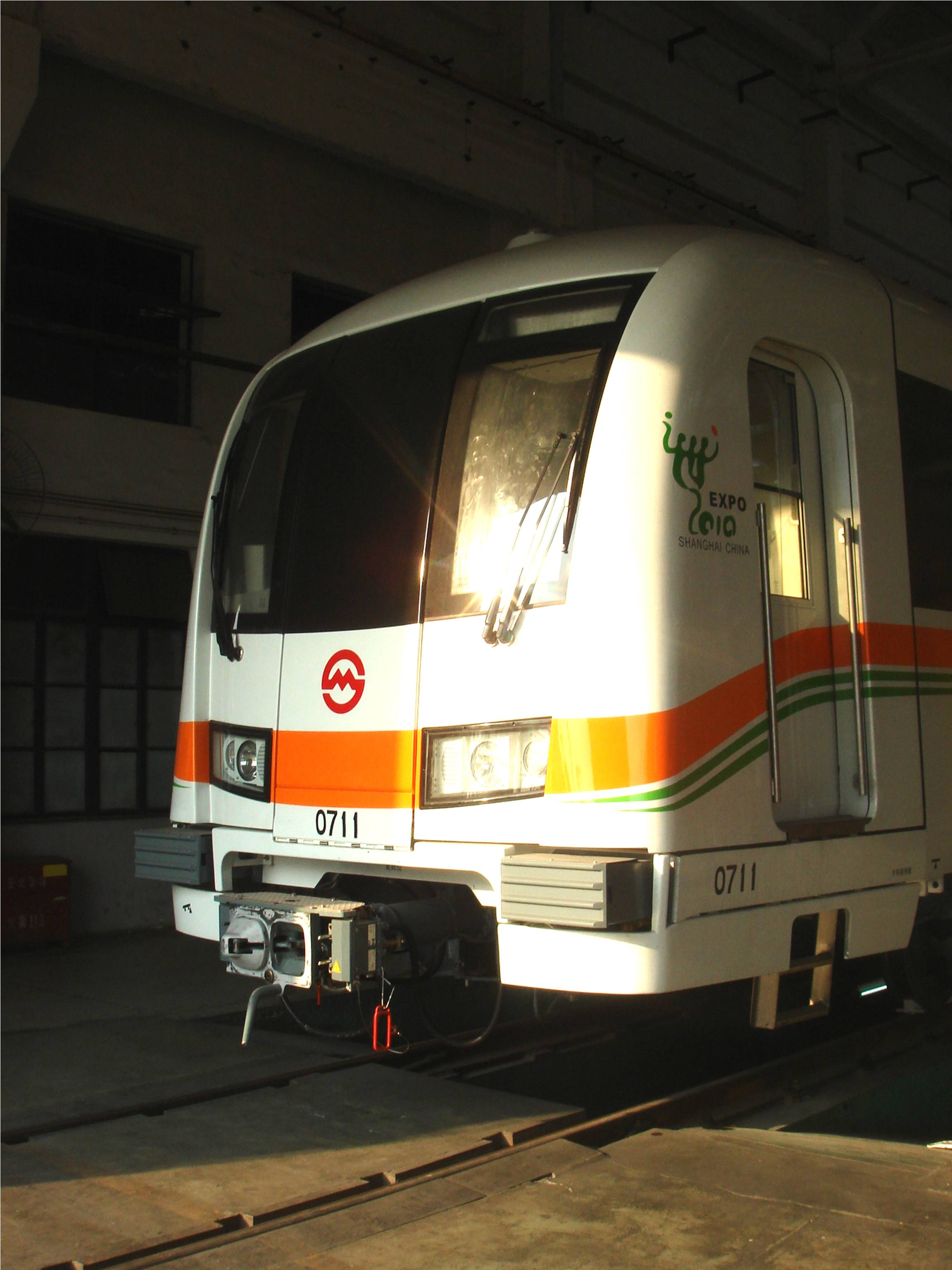
Car 070611 of set 0711 is featured an Expo 2010 logo.

== Maintenance ==
AC09 and AC10 are maintained by Shentong Alstom Vehicles Corporation (SAVC, a joint venture led by Shentong Metro and Alstom), including overhauls.

Since 2019, a disproportionate number of 09A02s and 07A01s have developed structural integrity issues.

== See also ==
- Shanghai Metro AC04
