= Shanghai Metro AC17 =

Rolling stock of Shanghai Metro Line 2

Shanghai Metro 02A03/02A04 AC17A/AC17B
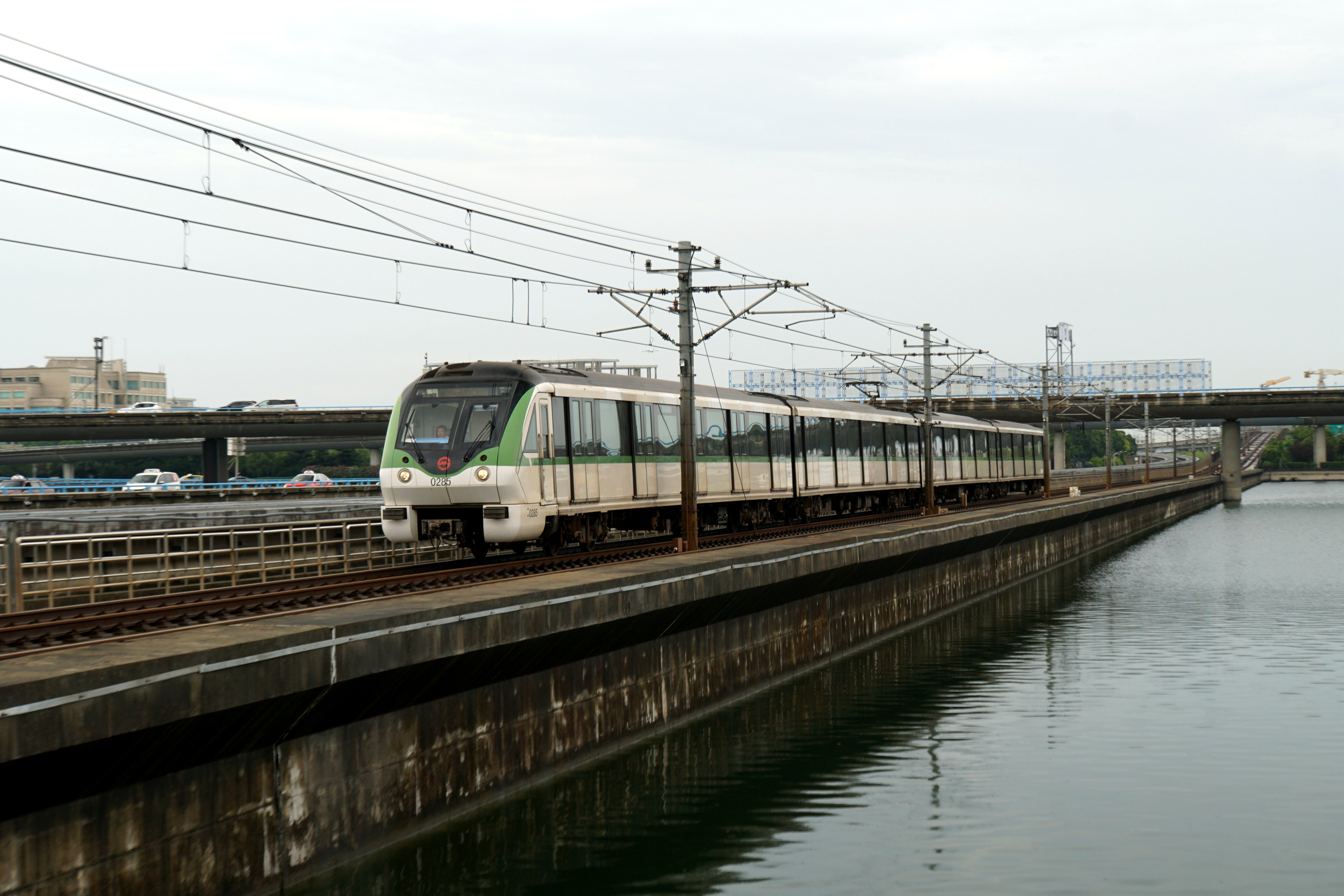
- A four-car 02A04 set approaching Pudong International Airport station in 2018
- Stock type: Class A EMU
- In service: 16 March 2010-present
- Manufacturers: Alstom and CSR Nanjing Puzhen
- Built at: Nanjing and Shanghai, China
- Family name: Metropolis
- Constructed: 2009-2010; 2017-2019
- Entered service: 16 March 2010
- Number built: 256
- Number in service: 256
- Formation: Tc-Mp-M-Mp+Mp-M-Mp-Tc
- Fleet numbers: 022971-025522
- Capacity: 310 per car
- Operator: Shentong Metro Group
- Depots: Beidi Road Depot; Longyang Road Depot; Chuansha Yard
- Line served: 2

Specifications
- Car body construction: Aluminum alloy
- Train length: 139.98 m (459 ft 3 in)
- Car length: 23.54 m (77 ft 3 in)
- Width: 3 m (9 ft 10 in)
- Height: 3.8 m (12 ft 6 in)
- Doors: Electric doors
- Maximum speed: 80 km/h (50 mph)
- Traction system: Alstom ONIX 152 IGBT-VVVF
- Traction motors: Alstom 4LCA-2138 3-phases AC induction motors
- Acceleration: Maximum 0.9 km/(h⋅s) (0.559 mph/s)
- Deceleration: 1 km/(h⋅s) (0.621 mph/s) (service); 1.3 km/(h⋅s) (0.808 mph/s) (emergency)
- Electric systems: 1,500 V DC
- Current collection: Single-arm Pantograph
- Bogies: Alstom B25; Additional cars: CRRC Nanjing Puzhen PW80E
- Safety systems: CASCO Tranavi (CBTC, DTO/GoA3) and GRS Micro Cabmatic (TBTC, ATO/GoA2)
- Track gauge: 4 ft 8 1/2 in (1,435 mm)

The 02A03 and the 02A04 (formerly known as AC17) are a class of electric multiple unit currently used on used on the Line 2 of Shanghai Metro. It was introduced into service in 2010 with the west and east extension of Line 2. A total of 256 cars were built by Alstom and CSR Nanjing Puzhen.

In 2014, AC17A was renamed as 02A03 and AC17B was renamed as 02A04.

== Overview ==
AC17 trains are divided into two types of stock, AC17A and AC17B. Their designs are identical to the AC13 trains, which are used on Line 10. They have livery in green, white and black.

By 19 April 2019, AC17Bs were assigned for the service of east extension (Guanglan Road station – Pudong International Airport station) only.

== Formation of AC17B ==
The AC17Bs were formed as Tc-Mp+Mp-Tc as they entered service. The contract PM109 consists additional 64 cars for expand 16 02A04 sets was awarded to CRRC Nanjing Puzhen in December 2016, to increase the capacity of Line 2.

Between 2018 and 2020, all 02A04s were gradually removed and transported to CRRC Nanjing Puzhen for expansion. Each set added four cars. Every 02A04 car added ceiling level displays during the expansion work.

== Signaling upgrade ==
In 2023, 02A03s and 02A04s' signalling system were upgraded from ATO (TBTC) to DTO (CBTC).
