= Shanghai Metro AC14 and AC15 =

Shanghai Metro rolling stock

Shanghai Metro 06C02/06C03/08C02/08C03 AC14A/AC14B/AC15A/AC15B
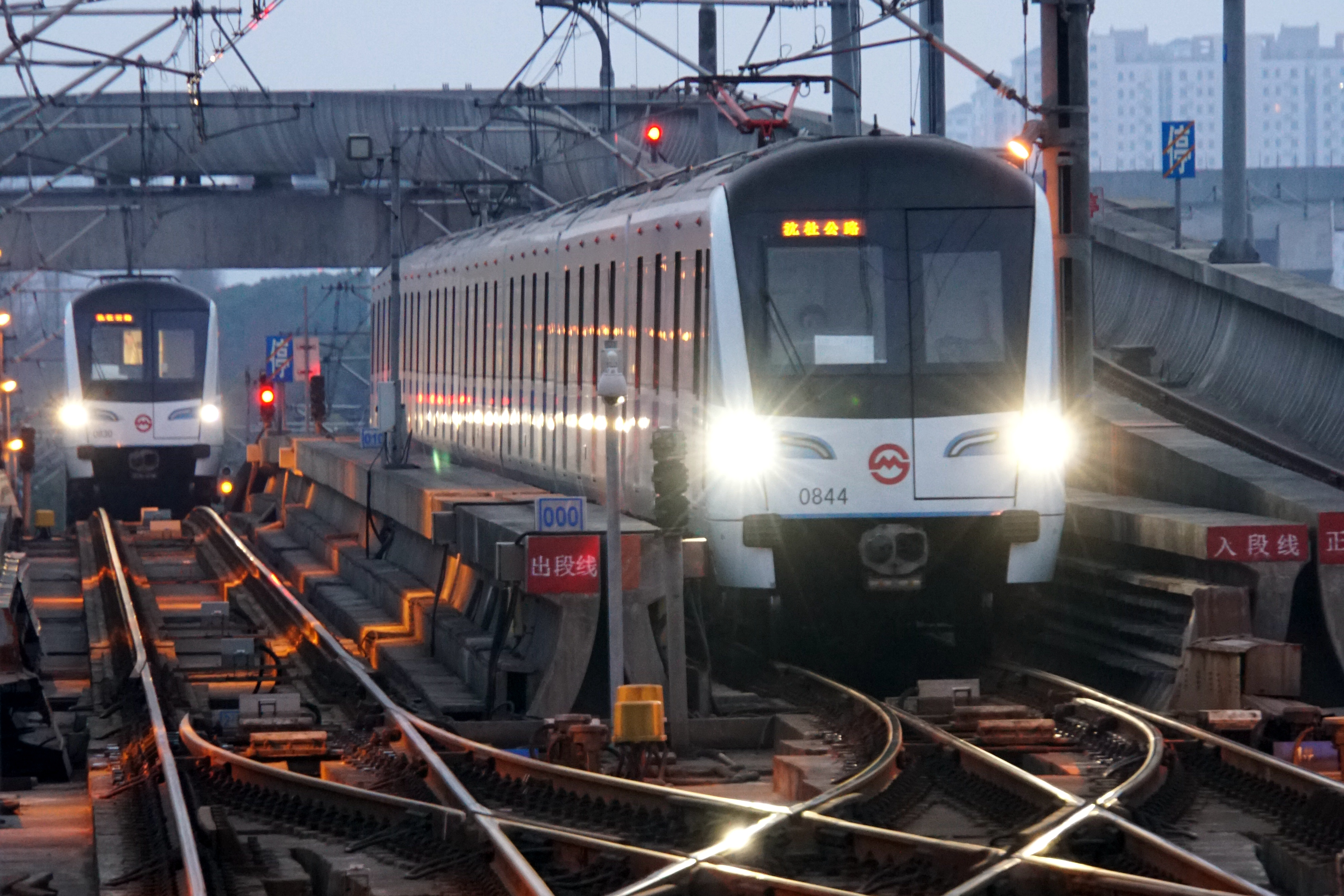
- Set 0844 at Shendu Highway sidings
- Stock type: Class C EMU
- In service: 28 November 2008-present
- Manufacturer: CNR Changchun Railway Vehicles
- Designer: TRICON Design
- Built at: Changchun, China
- Constructed: 2008-2012
- Entered service: 28 November 2008
- Number built: 382
- Number in service: 379 (3 cars out of service)
- Formation: Tc-Mp+Mp-Tc; Tc-Mp-M-M+M-Mp-Tc
- Fleet numbers: 060851-062001; 081691-083341
- Capacity: 200 per car
- Operators: Shentong Metro Group
- Depots: Gangcheng Road Depot; Sanlin Yard; Yinhang Depot; Pujiang Town Yard
- Lines served: 6 8

Specifications
- Car body construction: Aluminum alloy
- Train length: 77.86 m (255 ft 5 in); 136.18 m (446 ft 9 in)
- Car length: 19.44 m (63 ft 9 in)
- Width: 2.6 m (8 ft 6 in)
- Height: 3.8 m (12 ft 6 in)
- Doors: Electric doors
- Maximum speed: 80 km/h (50 mph)
- Traction system: Hitachi VFI-HD1420B or VFI-HD1420BA IGBT-VVVF
- Traction motors: Hitachi HS34532-03RB 3-phase AC induction motor
- Electric system(s): 1,500 V DC
- Current collection: Single-arm Pantograph
- Bogies: CNR Changchun Railway Vehicles CW2100D (powered), CW2100 (trailer)
- Safety system(s): Thales SelTrac (CBTC, ATO/GoA2)
- Track gauge: 1,435 mm (4 ft 8 1/2 in) standard gauge

The 06C02, 06C03, 08C02 and the 08C03 (formerly known as AC14 and AC15) are the main models of electric multiple unit currently used on Line 6 and Line 8. They were first entered service in November 2009 on Line 8.

In 2014, AC14A renamed 06C02, AC14B renamed 06C03, AC15A renamed 08C02 and AC15B renamed 08C03.

== Overview ==
=== AC14A and AC14B ===
The AC14A and AC14B (currently known as 06C02 and 06C03) are assigned for Line 6 service. The trains have livery in white, black and pink. 06C03 has interior electronic strip maps to show the stations, route and transfers of Line 6.

=== AC15A and AC15B ===
The AC15A and AC15B (currently known as 08C02 and 08C03) are assigned for Line 8 service. The trains have livery in white, black and blue. 08C03 has interior electronic strip maps to show the stations, route and transfers of Line 8. Since 2025, five 08C02 sets will be reassembled into four-car sets and reassigned to Line 6. Three M cars (car with motor) of each set will be temporary out of service since the reassignment.

== Signaling upgrade ==
The 06C02 and 06C03 will receive a signal retrofitting to upgrade to DTO (GoA3) operation since 2025.
