= Shanghai Metro AC19 =

Rolling stock of Shanghai Metro Line 16

Shanghai Metro 16A01 AC19
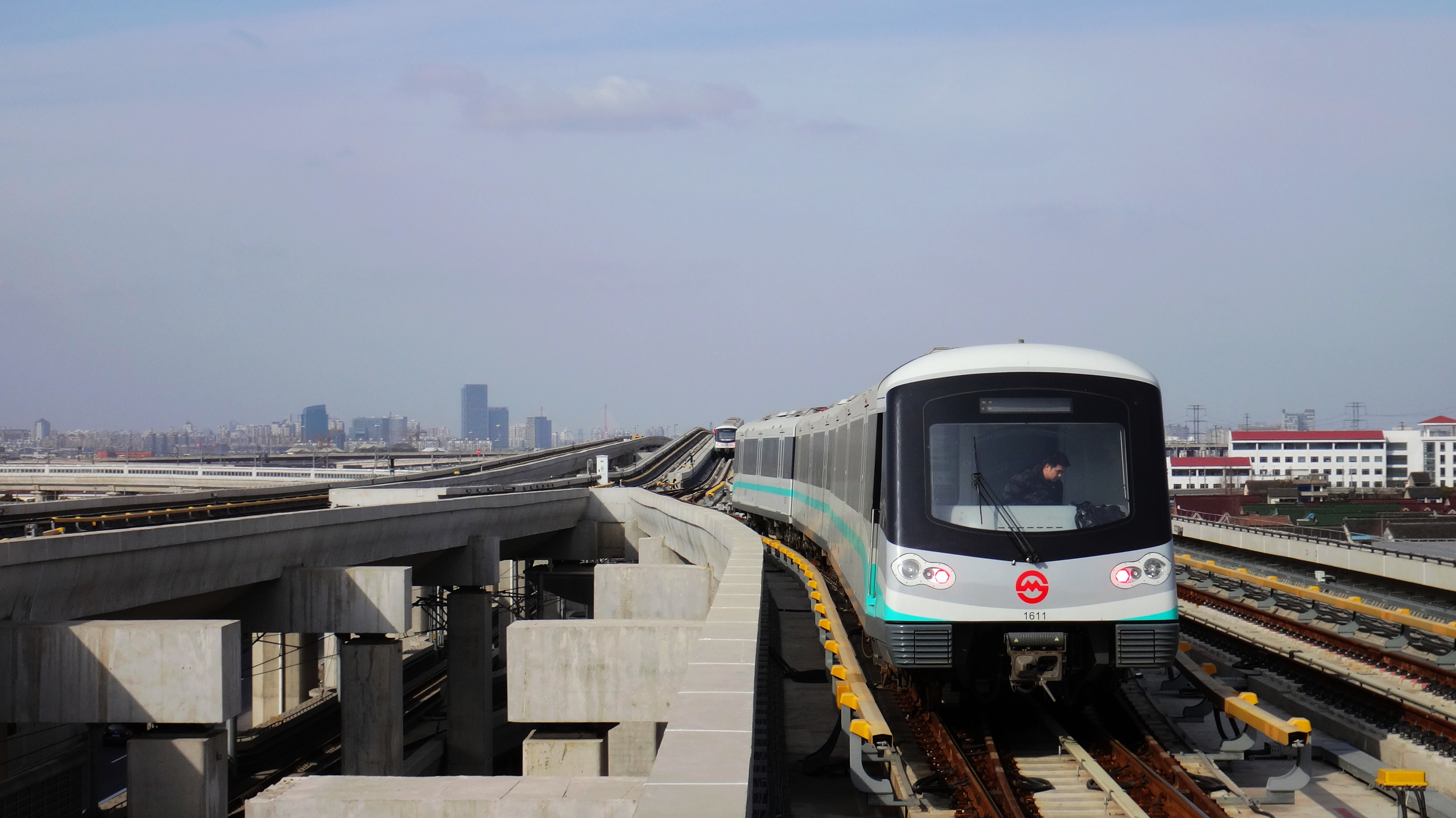
- Set 1626 at Luoshan Road station
- Stock type: Class A EMU
- In service: 2013-present
- Manufacturer: CSR Zhuzhou Locomotive
- Built at: Zhuzhou, China
- Constructed: 2012-2014
- Entered service: 29 December 2013
- Number built: 138
- Number in service: 138
- Formation: TMc-M-TMc
- Fleet numbers: 160011-161383
- Capacity: 372 per car
- Operator: Shentong Metro Group
- Depots: Chuanyang River Yard; Yebei Depot
- Line served: 16

Specifications
- Car body construction: Aluminum alloy
- Train length: 139.98 m (459 ft 3 in)
- Car length: 23.54 m (77 ft 3 in)
- Width: 3 m (9 ft 10 in)
- Height: 3.8 m (12 ft 6 in)
- Doors: Electric doors
- Maximum speed: 120 km/h (75 mph)
- Traction system: Siemens Mobility G1500 D1100/400 M5-1 IGBT-VVVF
- Traction motors: Siemens Mobility 1TB2016-0GA02 3-phases AC induction motors
- Acceleration: Maximum 3.2 km/(h⋅s) (1.988 mph/s)
- Deceleration: 3.6 km/(h⋅s) (2.237 mph/s) (service); 4.7 km/(h⋅s) (2.920 mph/s) (emergency)
- Electric systems: Third rail and overhead line, 1500 V DC
- Current collection: Single-arm Pantograph and contact shoe
- Bogies: CSR Zhuzhou Locomotive ZMA-120
- Safety systems: CASCO Urbalis 888 (CBTC, ATO/GoA2)
- Multiple working: Same model
- Track gauge: 4 ft 8 1/2 in (1,435 mm)

The 16A01 (formerly known as AC19) is a type of passenger train operating on Line 16 of Shanghai Metro. They are manufactured by CSR Zhuzhou Locomotives and entered service in 2013.

The order was for a total of 46 3-car trains (138 cars). AC09B and AC19 are the last rolling stock formerly named with "AC-series" of Shanghai Metro. In 2014, AC16 was renamed as 16A01.

== Features ==
- Three doors per side of a car.
- The interior feature LCD screens on windows and LED displays at gangway connections to show the stations, route, transfers of Line 16, and external side screens to show the current destinations and service types.
- Trainsets can be double-coupled as a 6-car unit for operations.
- Pantographs are only used while the train is in the depot or yard.
- The 16A01 is the first rolling stock to use horizontal seats and selective door operation.

== See also ==
- B1 (Guangzhou Metro car)
