= Shanghai Metro AC04 =

Rolling stock of Shanghai Metro Line 9

Shanghai Metro 09A01 AC04 Movia 456
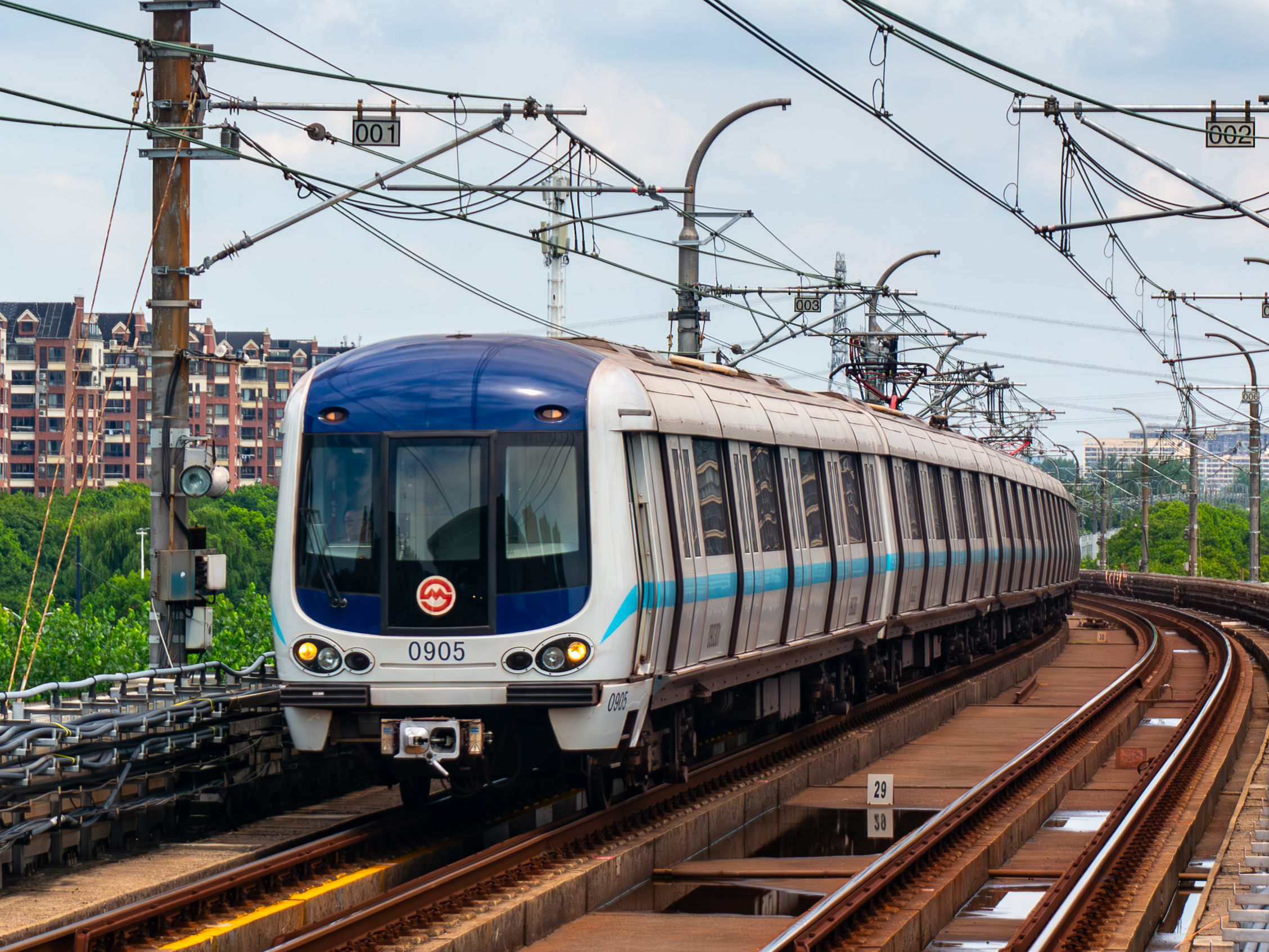
- Set 0905 approaching Songjiang University Town Station in 2025
- Stock type: Class A EMU
- In service: 14 December 2004-present
- Manufacturer: Changchun Bombardier Railway Vehicles
- Built at: Changchun, China
- Family name: MOVIA
- Constructed: 2004-2005
- Entered service: 14 December 2004
- Refurbished: Started from 2025
- Number built: 60
- Number in service: 60
- Formation: Tc-Mp-M+M-Mp-Tc
- Fleet numbers: 090011-090601 (historically: 011751-012341)
- Capacity: 310 per car
- Operators: Shentong Metro Group
- Depots: Jiuting Depot; Jinqiao Yard
- Lines served: 9

Specifications
- Car body construction: Aluminum alloy
- Train length: 139.98 m (459 ft 3 in)
- Car length: 24.39 m (80 ft 0 in) (Tc); 22.8 m (74 ft 10 in) (M/Mp)
- Width: 3 m (9 ft 10 in)
- Height: 3.8 m (12 ft 6 in)
- Doors: Electric doors
- Maximum speed: 80 km/h (50 mph)
- Traction system: Bombardier MITRAC TC1110 IGBT-VVVF
- Traction motors: 4 × Bombardier 4EBA-4040 220 kW (300 hp) 3-phase AC induction motor
- Power output: 3,520 kW (4,720 hp)
- Acceleration: Maximum 1 m/s^{2} (3.281 ft/s^{2})
- Deceleration: 1 m/s^{2} (3.281 ft/s^{2}) (service); 1.2 m/s^{2} (3.937 ft/s^{2}) (emergency)
- Electric system(s): 1,500 V DC
- Current collection: Single-arm Pantograph
- UIC classification: 2′2′+Bo′Bo′+Bo′Bo′+Bo′Bo′+Bo′Bo′+2′2′
- Bogies: Bombardier FLEXX Metro 3100
- Safety system(s): Thales SelTrac (CBTC, ATO/GoA2)
- Track gauge: 1,435 mm (4 ft 8 1/2 in) standard gauge

The 09A01 (formerly known as AC04 or Movia 456) is a current rolling stock used in Shanghai Metro, which originally ordered for Line 1 extension, but is currently assigned to Line 9 service due to the production discontinued of expansion cars. The trains were developed by Bombardier and built by CNR Changchun Railway Vehicles.

The contract for AC04 awarded to Changchun Bombardier Railway Vehicles on 18 December 2002. A total of 60 cars (10 sets) were built and entered service on 14 December 2004. The final train delivered on 22 March 2005.

== Overview ==
The design of AC04 is similar to A2 and A3, which are built for Guangzhou Metro. The interior seats are in green. The door indicators are incandescent lamps. The LED display's color was changed from orange to red after the first general overhaul.

AC04 trains were in white and red livery initially. After the service reassignment in 2007, the livery changed into white and light blue colors.

== Formation ==
AC04s are formed as Tc-Mp-M+Mp-M-Tc, they are numbered 011751-012341 (set 0130–0139). Since AC04s are assigned to Line 9 service, the set numbers changed to 0901–0910.

In 2014, AC04 renamed 09A01.

=== Post-first general overhaul ===
Since 2017, 09A01's car numbers changed to 090011–090601.

== In-operation issue ==
09A01s have no external indicator light and the door closing sound is low. After receiving complaints from passengers, the Shentong Metro decided to adjust the volume of the door closing sound.

== Refurbishment ==
In 2025, Shentong Metro has proposed a refurbishment program on all 09A01s.

== See also ==
- Shanghai Metro AC09 and AC10
- Shenzhen Metro MOVIA EMU
