= Shanghai Metro AC13 =

Rolling stock of Shanghai Metro Line 10

Shanghai Metro 10A01 AC13
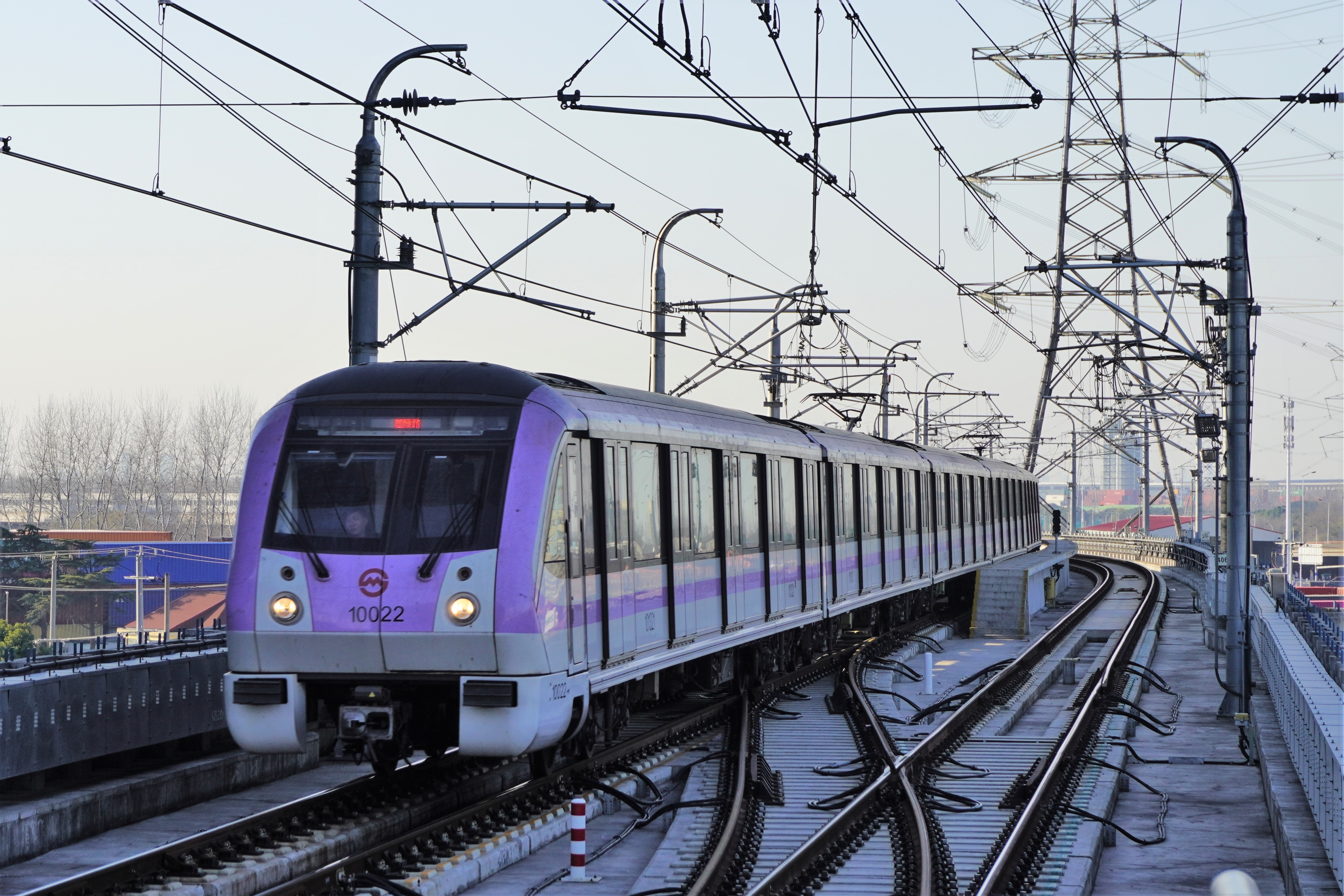
- 10A01 approaching Jilong Road station in 2021
- Stock type: Class A EMU
- In service: 10 April 2010-present
- Manufacturer: Alstom and CSR Nanjing Puzhen
- Built at: Nanjing and Shanghai, China
- Family name: Metropolis
- Constructed: 2009-2010
- Entered service: 10 April 2010
- Number built: 246
- Number in service: 246
- Formation: Tc-Mp-M+M-Mp-Tc
- Fleet numbers: 100011-102461
- Capacity: 310 per car
- Operators: Shentong Metro Group
- Depots: Gangcheng Road Yard; Wuzhong Road Depot
- Lines served: 10

Specifications
- Car body construction: Aluminum alloy
- Train length: 139.98 m (459 ft 3 in)
- Car length: 23.54 m (77 ft 3 in)
- Width: 3 m (9 ft 10 in)
- Height: 3.8 m (12 ft 6 in)
- Doors: Electric doors
- Maximum speed: 80 km/h (50 mph)
- Traction system: Alstom ONIX 152 IGBT-VVVF
- Traction motors: Alstom 4LCA-2138 3-phases AC induction motors
- Acceleration: Maximum 0.9 km/(h⋅s) (0.559 mph/s)
- Deceleration: 1 km/(h⋅s) (0.621 mph/s) (service); 1.3 km/(h⋅s) (0.808 mph/s) (emergency)
- Electric system(s): 1,500 V DC
- Current collection: Single-arm Pantograph
- Bogies: Alstom B25
- Safety system(s): CASCO Urbalis 888 (CBTC, UTO/GoA4) and CASCO Tranavi Qiji (TACS, UTO/GoA4)
- Track gauge: 4 ft 8 1/2 in (1,435 mm)

The 10A01 (formerly known as AC13) is a model of electric multiple unit currently used on the Line 10 of Shanghai Metro. A total of 246 cars (41 sets) were built. It was the first mass-produced unattended train operation (UTO/GoA4) passenger rolling stock in Shanghai.

The subsequent model of rolling stock for Line 10, 10A02, is similar in design to the 10A01, but was built under different contract and has a slightly different outer and interior appearance.

In 2014, AC13 was renamed 10A01.

== Description ==
The AC13 have livery in black, light purple and white. The first train delivered on 13 September 2009. By March 2010, 26 trains have been delivered.

Between 2020 and 2022, 10A01s were overhauled under contract PM164, and all trailer car's bulkheads of driver cab have been removed.

== Mishap ==
On 27 September 2011, two southbound trains collided between Yuyuan Garden station and Laoximen station. Cars 100251 and 100961 were damaged. They were repaired and backed for service after the accident.

== See also ==
- Shanghai Metro AC17
