= A1 (Guangzhou Metro car) =

Rolling stock of Guangzhou Metro Line 1

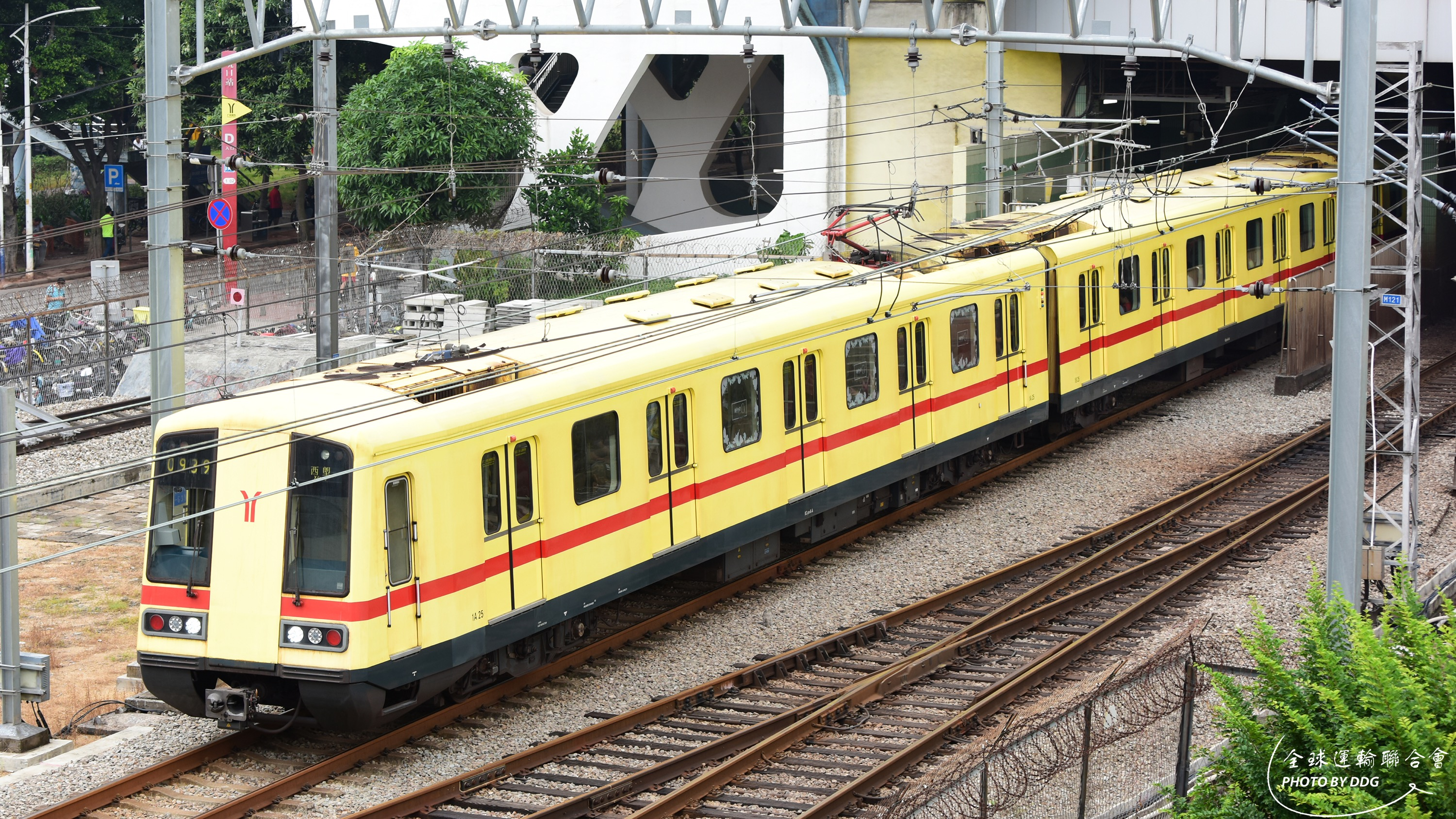
- Set 1x25-26 departing from Kengkou station on October 13, 2018
- Stock type: Class A EMU
- In service: 28 June 1997; 29 years ago - present
- Manufacturers: Adtranz (later Bombardier Transportation, now Alstom), Siemens Mobility
- Built at: Hamburg, Germany
- Family name: Modular Metro
- Constructed: 1996-1998
- Entered service: 28 June 1997; 29 years ago
- Refurbished: 2021–2024 by CRRC Zhuzhou Locomotive
- Number built: 126
- Number in service: 126
- Formation: Tcp-M-M+M-M-Tcp
- Fleet numbers: 1A01~1A02-1A41~1A42
- Capacity: 310 per car
- Operator: Guangzhou Metro Group
- Depot: Xilang Depot
- Line served: 1

Specifications
- Car body construction: Aluminum alloy
- Train length: 139.98 m (459 ft 3 in)
- Car length: 23.54 m (77 ft 3 in)
- Width: 3 m (9 ft 10 in)
- Height: 3.8 m (12 ft 6 in)
- Doors: Pneumatic doors Refurbishment: Electric doors
- Maximum speed: 80 km/h (50 mph)
- Traction system: AEG DASU 6 GTO-VVVF; Refurbishment: Zhuzhou CRRC Times Electric tPower-TN28 (UR1/JP2) IGBT-VVVF (Set 1x09-10: Zhuzhou CRRC Times Electric tPower-TN34 (UR1/JP4); Set 1x21-22: Jiangsu Kingway Rail Equipment WIND-TCM-1B1200FU02)
- Traction motors: Siemens Mobility 1TB2010-0GA02 3-phases AC induction motors (Refurbished set 1x09-10: CRRC Zhuzhou Institute PMSM; Refurbished set 1x21-22: Jiangsu Kingway Rail Equipment WIND-TMM-1T506-659YNJ02 Hybrid-reluctance motor)
- Acceleration: Maximum 1.0 km/(h⋅s) (0.621 mph/s)
- Deceleration: 1.0 km/(h⋅s) (0.621 mph/s) (service); 1.2 km/(h⋅s) (0.746 mph/s) (emergency)
- Electric systems: 1,500 V DC
- Current collection: Single-arm Pantograph
- UIC classification: 2′2′+Bo′Bo′+Bo′Bo′+Bo′Bo′+Bo′Bo′+2′2′
- Bogies: DUEWAG or Siemens Mobility SF2100
- Track gauge: 4 ft 8 1/2 in (1,435 mm)

The A1 (commonly known as Guangzhou Metro Line 1 Train or "Daxi" (大西/Big West)) is a rolling stock built by Adtranz (acquired by Bombardier Transportation in 2001, then Alstom in 2021) and Siemens Mobility from 1996 to 1998 for the Line 1, with operation in Guangzhou Metro. They were refurbished from 2021 to 2024 by CRRC Guangzhou Rail Transit Equipment in Dazhou Stabling Yard.

On 29 December 2002, A1 trains were assigned for service on Line 2 until the A2 trains were delivered, which in turn were replaced with A4 trains.

== History ==
On 16 November 1993, Siemens Mobility was awarded the contract to build the rolling stock for Line 1 of Guangzhou Metro. The first train was delivered on 9 April 1997, entering service on 28 June 1997, and the final train delivered on 15 March 1999.

== Details ==
The design of the A1 is identical to the AC01 and AC02, which are in operation with the Shanghai Metro. A1 trains have a plain yellow livery with a red stripe running along the body. The train length is about 140m, with a car height of 3.8m and width of 3m. The Tcp cars (Trailer car with cab and pantograph) have halogen headlights and every car originally had five-color indicators.

== Roster ==
	← Xilang Guangzhou East Railway Station →					
Formation	1Axx (Tcp)	1Bxx (M1)	1Cxx (M2)	1Cxx (M2)	1Bxx (M1)	1Axx (Tcp)
Numbers	1A01 ∥ 1A41	1B01 ∥ 1B41	1C01 ∥ 1C41	1C02 ∥ 1C42	1B02 ∥ 1B42	1A02 ∥ 1A42

- Tcp – Trailer car with pantograph
- M1 and M2 – Motor car

== Modernization ==
=== First overhaul ===
In 2008, A1 trains underwent an overhaul. Set 1x01-02 was the first to be overhauled and returned back to service. This set's doors were also converted to electric doors.

=== Refurbishment ===
The entire fleet was refurbished within a period of three years between 2021 and 2024. The first refurbished train was returned to service on 30 May 2022.

== See also ==
- Shanghai Metro DC01
- Shanghai Metro AC01 and AC02
