= Shanghai Metro DC01 =

Shanghai Metro rolling stock

Shanghai Metro 01A01/01A02 DC01A/DC01B/DC01C
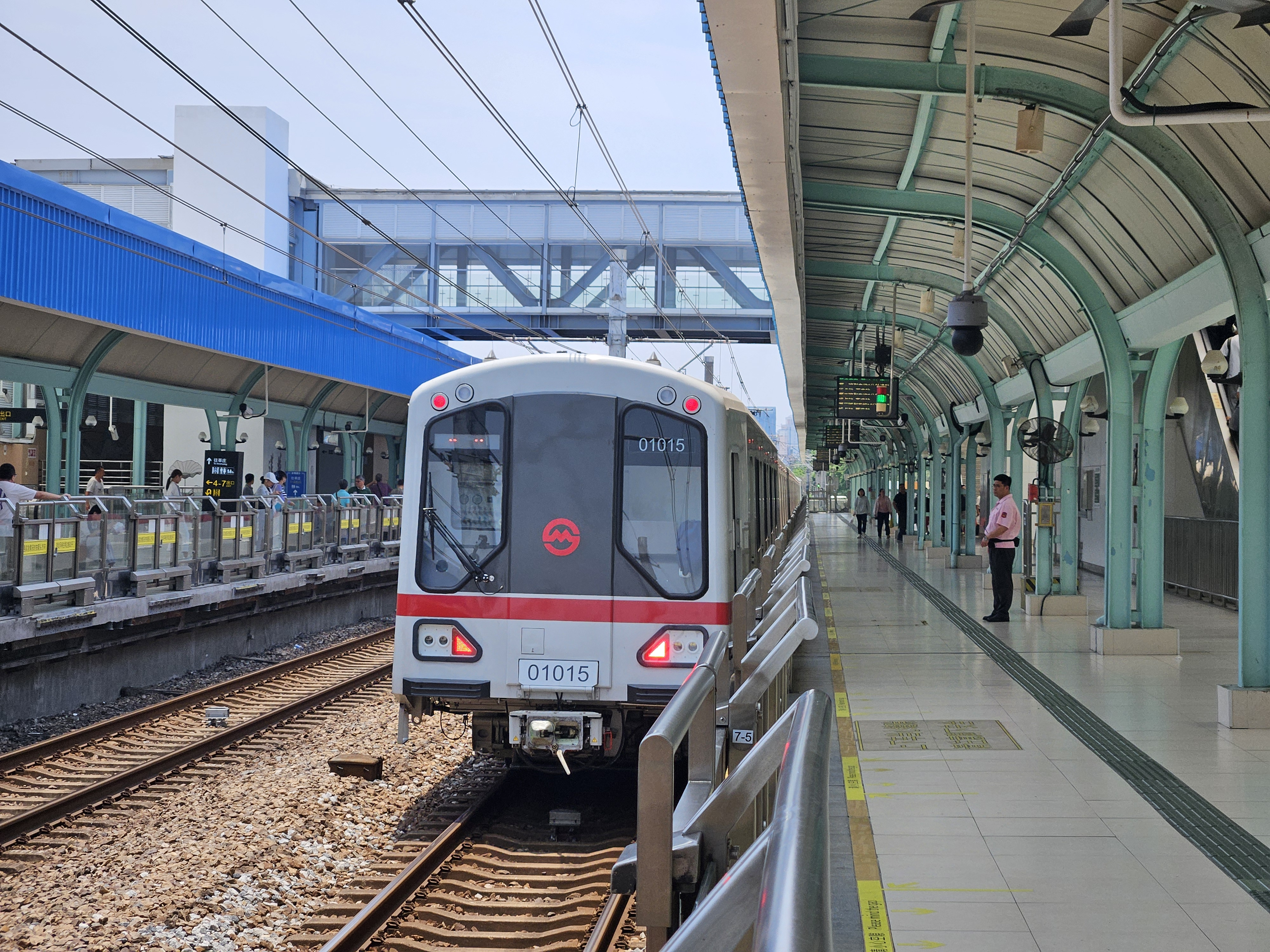
- Set 115 departing from Lianhua Road station in June 2026
- Stock type: Class A EMU
- In service: 28 May 1993–present
- Manufacturers: AEG; CSR Zhuzhou Locomotive
- Built at: Hennigsdorf, Germany; Zhuzhou, China
- Constructed: 1992–1994; 2007–2009
- Entered service: 28 May 1993
- Refurbished: 01A02: 2024–2026
- Retired: 01A01: 2023–2024 (older 92113: 2004)
- Scrapped: 01A01: Started from 2026
- Number built: 129
- Number in service: 01A01: (8 cars in mainline inspection service, 8 cars in training service); 01A02: 16 (24 refurbished cars undergoing pre-service testing)
- Number retired: 71
- Number preserved: 1
- Number scrapped: 1
- Successor: 01A01: 01A08
- Formation: Tc-Mp-M-Mp+M-Mp-M-Tc
- Fleet numbers: 92011-92241, 93011-93481, 94011-94241, 014352-014643, 14652 and 14663
- Capacity: 310 per car
- Operator: Shentong Metro Group
- Depots: Meilong Depot; Fujin Road Yard
- Line served: 1

Specifications
- Car body construction: Aluminum alloy
- Car length: 23.54 m (77 ft 3 in)
- Width: 3 m (9 ft 10 in)
- Height: 3.8 m (12 ft 6 in)
- Doors: Pneumatic doors Electric doors (01A02)
- Maximum speed: 80 km/h (50 mph)
- Traction system: AEG GTO chopper Replacement: Zhuzhou CSR Times Electric TGN-51 IGBT-VVVF
- Traction motors: AEG CUS 5668 H DC motor Replacement: Zhuzhou CSR Times Electric JD-118A 3-phase AC induction motor
- Acceleration: Maximum 4.0 km/(h⋅s) (2.485 mph/s)
- Deceleration: 3.6 km/(h⋅s) (2.237 mph/s) (service); 4.7 km/(h⋅s) (2.920 mph/s) (emergency)
- Auxiliaries: Since 2007: Zhuzhou CSR Times Electric TGN-38 IGBT
- Electric systems: 1,500 V DC
- Current collection: Single-arm Pantograph
- Bogies: Siemens Mobility SF2100; Additional cars: CSR Zhuzhou Locomotive ZMA-080
- Safety systems: Current: GRS Micro Cabmatic (Fixed-block, ATO/GoA2); Future, 01A02: CASCO Tranavi (CBTC, DTO/GoA3)
- Track gauge: 4 ft 8 1/2 in (1,435 mm)

The 01A01 and the 01A02 (formerly known as DC01) are a class of electric multiple unit used on the Line 1 of Shanghai Metro. They are built by AEG and CSR Zhuzhou Locomotive, with first delivery on 30 October 1992. These cars are numbered 92011–92241, 93011–93481, 94011–94241, 014352–014643, 14652 and 14663 (set 101–116).

Before the delivery of AC02 and AC03, DC01 trains were also assigned to the services of Line 2 and Line 3.

== Features ==
DC01 trains have livery in red and white. 01A01's door indicators are LEDs instead of halogen lamps. The five-color indicators and grid lampshades are retained after expansion. All carriages have installed red LED scrolling displays to show the next station.

01A02's carriage lampshades are white plastic boards instead of grids. The original destination blinds are changed into LED displays. All pneumatic doors converted into electric doors. Five-color indicators are removed and all carriages have installed yellow LED scrolling displays to show the next station.

In the summer of 2006, after poor cooling affected 16 DC01 sets, high temperatures inside the carriages had long been a problem, 96 ice cubes have been put into a one-meter-high container to alleviate the high temperature of the 96 carriages. In order to make up for the defects in the refrigeration power and design of carriage, emergency measures must be taken whenever the temperature reaches 33 °C (91 °F) or more. With the transformation between 2006 and 2008 from 6 cars set to 8 cars set, the air conditioners were improved and modernized, making ice containers a thing of the past.

== Formation ==
DC01 has three types of carriages: Tc (Trailer car with driving cab), Mp (car with motors and pantograph) and M (car with motors only). They were formed as Tc-Mp-M+Mp-M-Tc. After the expansion program, all trains are formed as 8 carriages: Tc-Mp-M-Mp+M-Mp-M-Tc.

== History ==
=== Original sets ===
The initial contract proposed in 1988 and awarded on 13 May 1989 included 96 carriages (16 sets), as the expected ridership of Line 1 in 1990s and 2000s only required 6-cars sets.This requirement also applied to two types of subsequent rolling stocks, AC01 and AC04.

=== Expansion program ===
CSR Zhuzhou Locomotive expanded 11 DC01 trains between 2007 and 2008. 10 trains (set 101, 103-110 and 114) each added 2 additional cars. They are from another 5 trains (set 111–113, 115 and 116). During the expansion, all cars' traction systems were replaced from GTO chopper to IGBT-VVVF. Motors have also changed from DC to AC. Afterwards, these trains renamed DC01B.

Set 102 was taken out of service due to the 2004 Tonghe Xincun station crash. After replacing car 92113 and changing of the traction systems and motors, set 102 renamed separately as DC01A and backed to service in September 2007. It also needed to be expanded. Unlike DC01B, the expansion program for 102 is to order a batch of 2 new cars from CSR Zhuzhou Locomotive (14652 and 14663).

Between 2008 and 2009, a contract for DC01 awarded to CSR Zhuzhou Locomotive includes a third batch of 30 cars to expand the remaining sets, 111–113, 115 and 116. During the expansion, 10 original cars (93371, 93421, 93431, 93481, 94011, 94061, 94131, 94181, 94191 and 94241) underwent an extensive renovation. Later, they were renamed as DC01C.

=== Post-expansion ===
In 2014, all three types of DC01 trains renamed again. DC01A and DC01B renamed 01A01, DC01C renamed 01A02.

== Mishap ==
Car 92113 wrecked on March 24, 2004, at the Tonghe Xincun station. 92113 was hit by car 99251. In 2007, it was stripped for removing parts, stored in the maintenance shop of Meilong Depot and replaced by the new carriage built by CSR Zhuzhou Locomotive.

== Withdrawal ==
After an overhaul for 01A01, numerous structural failures and frame cracks found in several 01A01 cars in 2016. 80 cars needed to be re-paired to repair and maintain service. After the repairing, 8 cars (93131, 93162, 93293, 93301, 93322, 93333, 93402 and 93413) were too faulty and used as spare parts sources.

The 01A01's expected lifespan was 26 years old for the structural issues. After received several structure repairings by 2019, the expected lifespan was extended to 35 years. However, since the delivery of the 01A07 trains, demand for the 01A01s drastically lowered. By middle 2020, 01A01's usages were gradually minimized, becoming a reserve fleet – rarely run regular service outside of peak hours. 8 cars (92102, 93121, 93233, 93262, 93273, 93311, 14652 and 14663) removed from service and stabled on a shunting sidings of Meilong Depot since 2020.

The newer 92113, 93191–93222, 93361, 94142 and 94153 (set 108) are the first cars to be retired in July 2023. 93191's odometer shows 3,000,456 km, considered as reached the end of its life. Therefore, Shentong Metro decommissioned 93191. It was donated to Shanghai University of Engineering Science in October 2023. 92113, 93202–93222, 93361, 94142 and 94153 are also out of service and stored in Fujin Road Yard.

The shortest-lasting 01A01s were in service for just 9 years, car 14652 and 14663. The newer car 92113 made its final run in April 2023, having been in service for just 16 years. Despite these cars are still able to operate and relatively newness, they never returned to service and remain in storage since ever the removal from service.

The remainder of the 01A01 cars are expected to be phased out by 2028 and replaced by 01A08s. However, there are no more 01A01 assigned for any passenger service since June 2024. In 2024 and 2025, they have received two rounds of cracks welding, as a part of the structure repairing program.

By July 2026, Shanghai Metro Museum confirmed that all the 01A01 are fully retired from service since June 2024.

=== Post-withdrawal modification ===
From 24 May 2024, Shentong Metro launched a program to renovate 8 cars' (92131–92181, 94022 and 94033) electrical equipments, to verify the signaling replacement feasibility of the existing fleets and test the CBTC installation on Line 1.

== Refurbishment ==
By 2021, 01A02s have been reduced usages, as the original cars were aging and considered unreliable. They have to be taken out of service intermittently to receive maintenance.

Several proposals for the disposal of 01A02 were put forward in 2023:

- Rebuild and convert into track inspection units.
- Decommission the entire fleet. Only keep one original car and preserve in Shanghai Metro Museum.
- Order the fourth batch of 10 new cars to replace 10 original ones.
- Refurbish all original cars and make the additional cars able to serve for at least 29 to 30 years.

Shentong Metro chose to refurbish all 01A02 units for financial consideration. Renovation includes structural repair, signalling upgrade and electrical rectification, to extend their lifespans for an additional 14 years. Refurbishment is expected to be completed by November 2025. Cars will be removed and transported to Shanghai Circuit Depot and CRRC Zhuzhou Locomotive for renovation and rebuild. After the CBTC installation, 01A02s will be able to be assigned to Line 2 service again.

The 94131, 94181 and 014532–014583, are the first cars to be refurbished (set 115). They were delivered back to the Fujin Road Yard on 28 June 2025. The last cars (94191, 94241 and 014592–014643, set 116) have been sent for refurbishment on 17 January 2026.

== Preservation and other uses ==
- 93191 – donated to Shanghai University of Engineering Science and stored at Songjiang Campus.
- 92011–92033, 93442, 93453 and 94102–94121 – used for train operator training and stabled in Longyang Road Depot.
- 92131–92181 and 94022, 94033 – used as an overhead line inspection unit and stabled in Meilong Depot.
- 94071 – Half of the carriage placed at Shanghai Mixc, as a collection of Shanghai Metro Museum.

== See also ==
- A1 (Guangzhou Metro car)
- Shanghai Metro AC01 and AC02
- Shanghai Metro AC16 – 01A02 additional cars are based on same design.
