= Shanghai Metro AC01 and AC02 =

Rolling stock of Shanghai Metro Line 1 and Line 2

Shanghai Metro 01A03/01A04/02A01 AC01A/AC01B/AC01C/AC02A
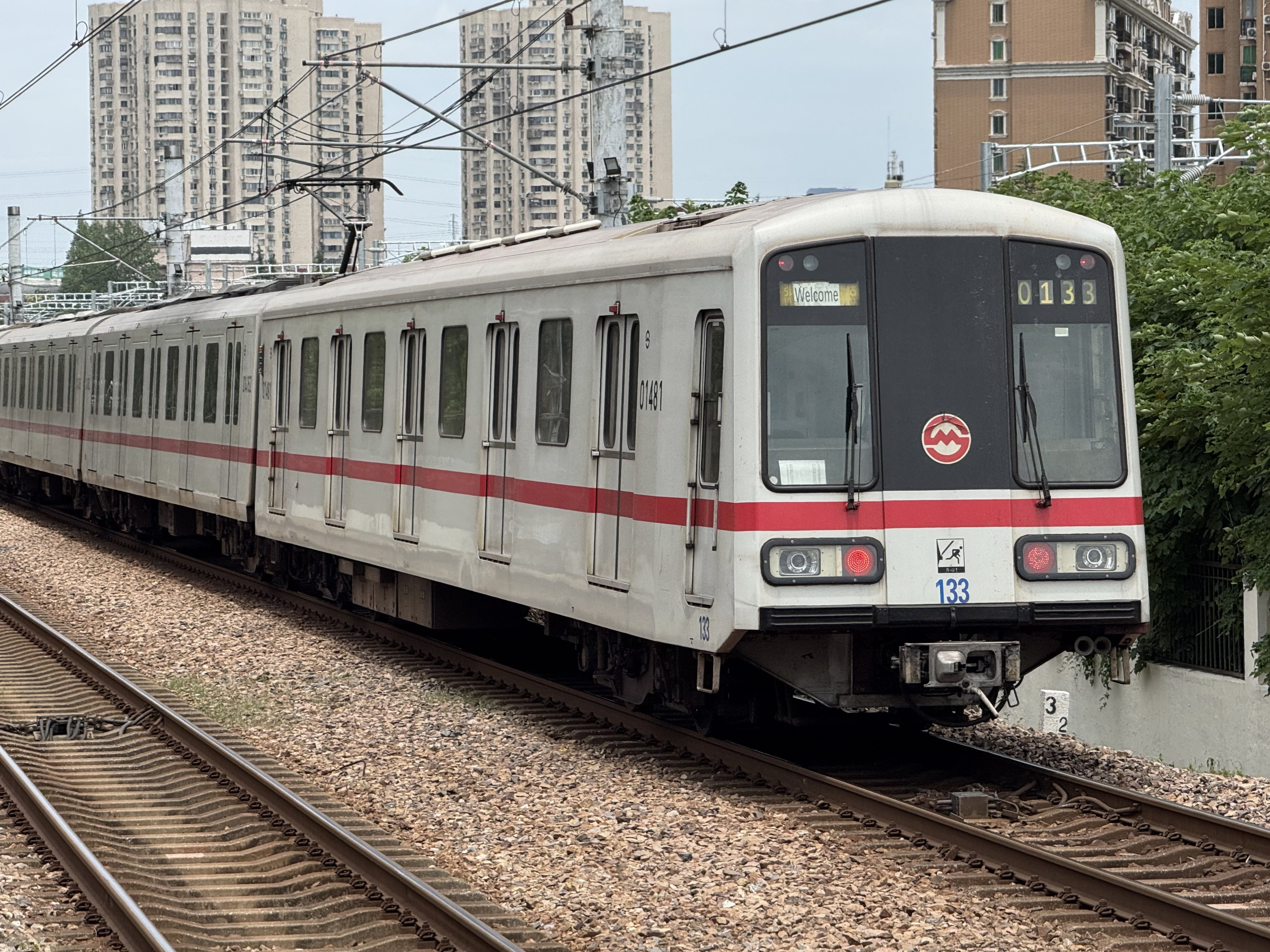
- A train of 01A04 leaving the Lianhua Road station on June 20, 2025

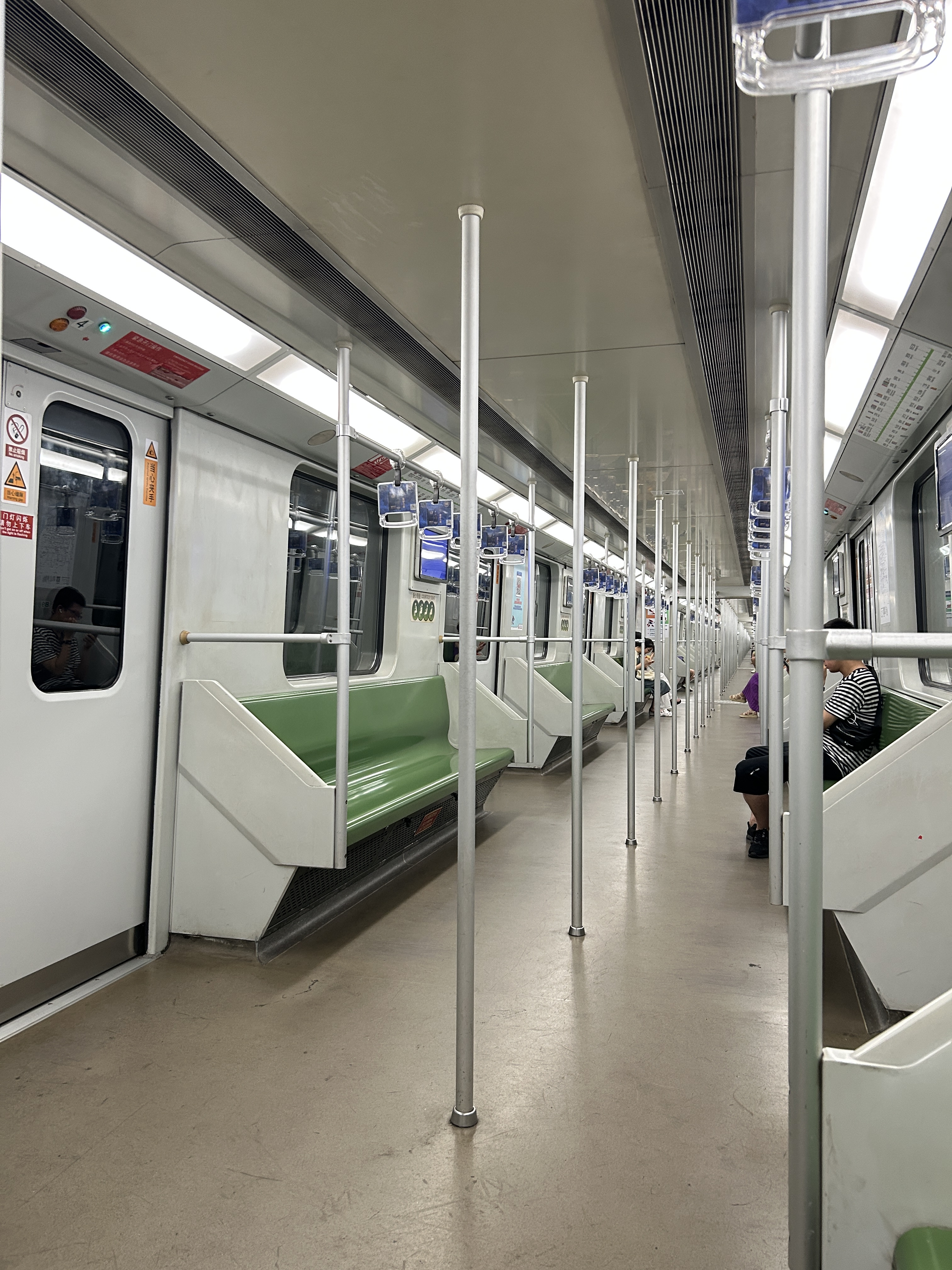
- Interior of an AC02/02A01 train
- Stock type: Class A EMU
- In service: 1999-present
- Manufacturers: Adtranz and Siemens Mobility; CSR Zhuzhou Locomotive
- Built at: Hamburg, Germany; Zhuzhou, China
- Family name: Additional cars of 01A04: Modular Metro
- Constructed: 1998-2001; 2006-2008; 2011
- Entered service: 8 September, 1999
- Refurbished: 01A04: Started from 2026
- Retired: 2009 (2 wrecked cars)
- Number built: 298
- Number in service: 01A03: 72; 01A04: 96; 02A01: 128
- Number retired: 2
- Formation: Tc-Mp-M-Mp+M-Mp-M-Tc
- Fleet numbers: 98011-98061, 99011-99541, 00011-00781, 01011-01841, 013632-014342, 14673 and 14682
- Capacity: 310 per car
- Operator: Shentong Metro Group
- Depots: Meilong Depot; Fujin Road Yard; Beidi Road Depot; Longyang Road Depot; Chuansha Yard
- Line served: 1 2

Specifications
- Car body construction: Aluminum alloy
- Train length: 139.98 m (459 ft 3 in)
- Car length: 23.54 m (77 ft 3 in)
- Width: 3 m (9 ft 10 in)
- Height: 3.8 m (12 ft 6 in)
- Doors: Pneumatic doors Electric doors (Additional cars of 01A04; modified 01A03 and 02A01 cars)
- Maximum speed: 80 km/h (50 mph)
- Traction system: Siemens Mobility G1500 D1150/580 M5-1 GTO-VVVF; 01A04: Siemens Mobility G1500 D1100/400 M5-1 IGBT-VVVF
- Traction motors: Siemens Mobility 1TB2010-1GA02 3-phases AC induction motors
- Acceleration: Maximum 3.2 km/(h⋅s) (1.988 mph/s)
- Deceleration: 3.6 km/(h⋅s) (2.237 mph/s) (service); 4.7 km/(h⋅s) (2.920 mph/s) (emergency)
- Electric systems: 1,500 V DC
- Current collection: Single-arm Pantograph
- Bogies: DUEWAG or Simens Mobility SF2100
- Safety systems: 01A03 and 01A04: GRS Micro Cabmatic (Fixed-block, ATO/GoA2); 02A01: CASCO Tranavi (CBTC, DTO/GoA3) and US&S AF900 (TBTC, ATO/GoA2)
- Track gauge: 4 ft 8 1/2 in (1,435 mm)

The 01A03, 01A04 and the 02A01 (formerly known as AC01 and AC02) are a class of electric multiple unit currently used on Line 1 and Line 2 of Shanghai Metro. They are built by Adtranz, Siemens Mobility and CSR Zhuzhou Locomotive. The contract awarded on 31 July 1996. It was for a total of 216 cars (36 sets) initially, with an additional order of 12 cars (2 sets) in 2001. They are divided into two types of stock, AC01 for the Line 1, and AC02 for the Line 2.

Before the delivery of AC03, AC01 and AC02 trains were also assigned to the services of Line 3.

== Features ==
AC01 trains have livery in red and white and AC02 trains have livery in green and white. 01A03, 01A04 and 02A01's original cars are using the pneumatic doors and installed five-color indicators. 01A04's expansion cars are using the electric doors. 02A01 has no PIS (Passenger Information System) inside. Both AC01 and AC02 trains feature a white interior with dark green plastic seats, as well as LCD displayers which show Passenger Regulations. Every carriage's lampshades were changed from grids to white plastic boards during the 2021 overhaul.

== History ==
=== Original sets ===
Like the DC01, The initial contract for Line1 and Line 2 was designed as 6-cars sets, for the lower expected ridership in 1990s and 2000s. Trains were formed as Tc-Mp-M+Mp-M-Tc.

=== Expansion program ===
Since 2006, CSR Zhuzhou Locomotive expanded AC01 and AC02 trains. 8 AC01 trains (118–125) and 16 AC02 trains (201–216) each added 2 additional cars. These cars were from another 12 sets (126–129 and 217–224). These AC01 trains renamed AC01A and AC02 trains renamed AC02A.

The second contract for CSR Zhuzhou Locomotive included 72 cars for expanding the remaining 12 trains. During the expansion, 8 AC02 trains (217–224) renumbered 130–137. All trains (126-129 and 130-137) renamed AC01B and assigned to Line 1 service together.

Set 117 was the last to be expanded. Before the expansion project, this set involved in a crash at Shanghai Railway Station station on December 22, 2009, and was taken out of service. In 2011, the third contract awarded to CSR Zhuzhou Locomotive again, including 4 cars (98022, 98033, 14673 and 14682). 98022 and 98033 used for replacing two damaged cars with same numbers, 14673 and 14682 used for expanding the set. Set 117 was renamed AC01C separately.

=== Post-expansion ===
In 2014, all four types of train renamed again. AC01A and AC01C renamed 01A03, AC01B renamed 01A04, AC02A renamed 02A01.

In 2018 and 2019, some of the 01A03s and 02A01s were found several cracks on the frame during some scheduled inspections. These cars with structural defects were immediately being taken out of revenue service and Shentong Metro deployed emergency repairs by November 2019.

== Mishaps ==
On March 24, 2004, car 99251 hit car 92113 and damaged. It was repaired by Bombardier and returned to service later.

Cars 98033 and 98042 wrecked on December 22, 2009, at the Shanghai Railway Station station. 98033 and 98042 were hit by car 013151. In 2011, they were stripped for removing parts and stored in the maintenance shop of Meilong Depot. They were replaced by the new carriages built by CSR Zhuzhou Locomotive. In 2015, car 98042 was converted into SMTC Experimental Car by CRRC Dalian R&D and used for rolling stock maintainer training.

On July 15, 2018, set 133 was pulled out of service at North Zhongshan Road station due to the fault. While the train was moving to the Fujin Road Yard, a defective motor dropped on a wayside signal equipment, causing delays for all northbound trains on Line 1. Eventually, This set required an extensive repair and returned to service almost three years later on July 28, 2021.

== Modifications ==
=== 01A03 ===
Between 2023 and 2024, all 01A03s were modified at the shops of Fujin Road Yard and Meilong Depot. Every car's doors were replaced with electric doors from the pneumatic doors used before.

=== 01A04 ===
Since 2025, Shentong Metro launched a program to install CBTC signalings on all 01A04 units. On May 30, 2026, a trainset of 01A04 (set 130) was sent for refurbishment.

=== 02A01 ===
Cars 00071–00121, 01262 and 01273 were received a renovation for CBTC signaling upgrading and replacing pneumatic doors to electric doors. They are the first to be modernized and backed to service in December 2023. The rest 02A01s were getting modified and backed to service gradually since January 2024.

== See also ==
- Shanghai Metro DC01
- A1 (Guangzhou Metro car)
- Shanghai Metro AC05 – 01A04 expansion cars are based on same design.
