= KTM Class 93 =

Train class

Class 93
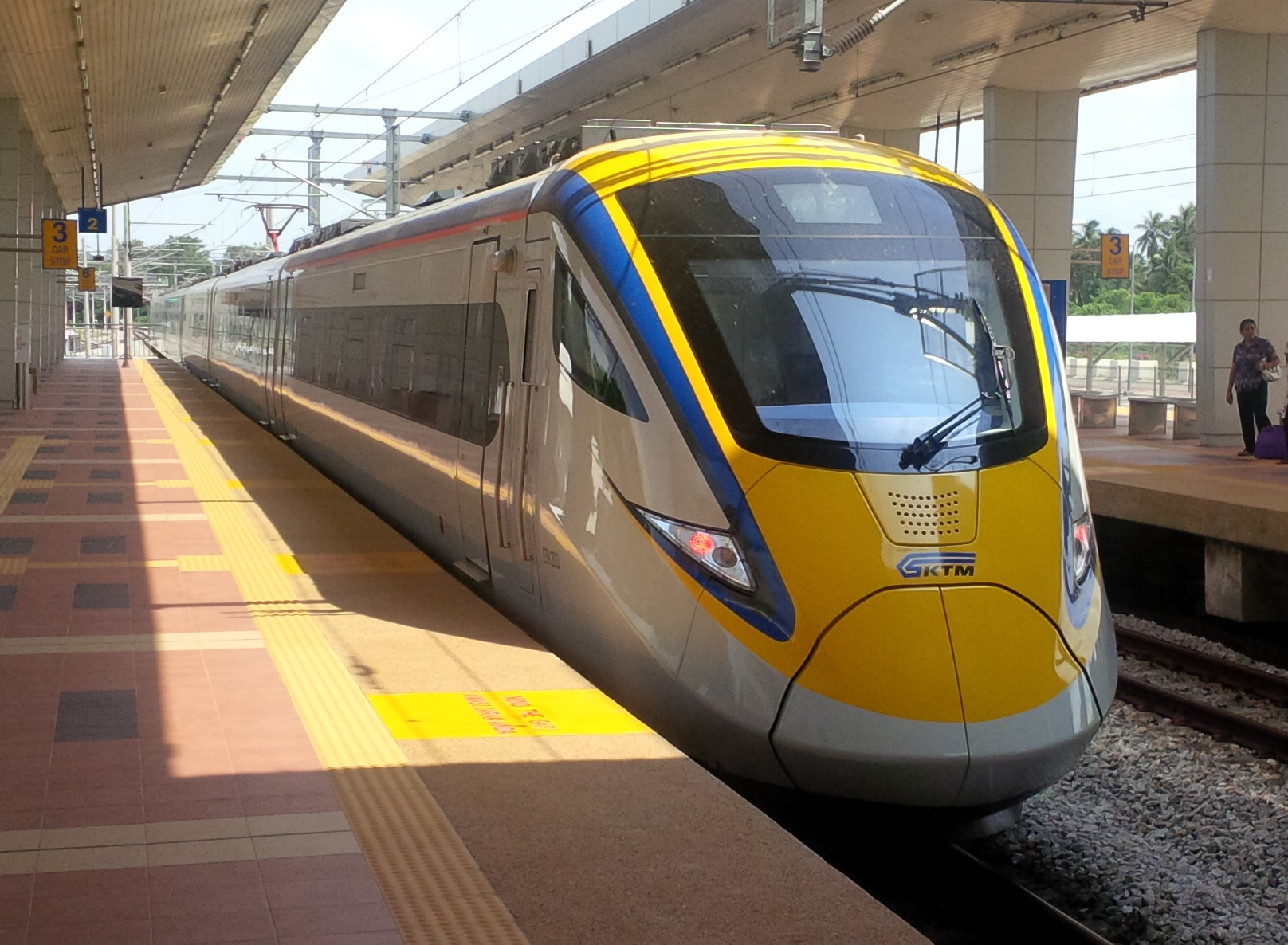
- ETS 203 KTM Class 93 at Pulau Sebang/Tampin station
- In service: 2015–present
- Manufacturer: CRRC Zhuzhou (initially CSR Zhuzhou) CRRC Rolling Stock Center Batu Gajah Malaysia
- Built at: Zhuzhou, China and Batu Gajah Malaysia
- Constructed: 2013–2018
- Number in service: Total: 114 cars (19 sets); One class configuration: 60 cars (10 sets): Two classes configuration: 54 cars (9 sets)
- Formation: 6 cars per trainset
- Capacity: One class configuration: 320 (320 seats): Two classes configuration: 312(312 seats)
- Operator: Keretapi Tanah Melayu
- Depot: Batu Gajah Rail Depot
- Line served: West Coast Line

Specifications
- Car body construction: Aluminium
- Train length: 140 m (459 ft 3 13/16 in)
- Car length: 24 m (78 ft 8 7/8 in) (Mc); 23 m (75 ft 5 1/2 in) (Tp/M)
- Width: 2.75 m (9 ft 1/4 in)
- Height: 3,905 mm (12 ft 9 3/4 in)
- Floor height: 1.1 m (3 ft 7 in)
- Doors: 2 single-leaf doors per side
- Wheel diameter: 850 mm (33 in)
- Maximum speed: Service: 140 km/h (90 mph); Design: 180 km/h (110 mph); Record: 176 km/h (110 mph)
- Weight: 258 t (254 long tons; 284 short tons)
- Traction system: Siemens SIBAC E951 D1442/310 M5 reaq IGBT–C/I
- Traction motors: 16 × Siemens 1TB2004-0GA02 160 kW (210 hp) 3-phase AC induction motor
- Power output: 2,560 kW (3,430 hp)
- Electric system: 25 kV 50 Hz AC overhead line
- Current collection: Double-arm Z-shaped Pantograph
- UIC classification: Bo′Bo′+2′2′+Bo′Bo′+Bo′Bo′+2′2′+Bo′Bo′
- Braking system: Two-pipe regenerative brake system
- Safety systems: ETCS, ATP
- Coupling system: AAR
- Track gauge: 1,000 mm (3 ft 3 3/8 in) metre gauge

The Class 93 is a type of electric multiple unit used by Keretapi Tanah Melayu for its intercity Electric Train Service (ETS). A total of 10 sets in 6-car formations have been built and delivered by CRRC Zhuzhou (initially CSR Zhuzhou) of China, with 9 additional sets ordered in 2019 with delivery finished in 2020 (these 9 sets has been branded as ETS2 or 93/2). As per the technology exchange agreement, part of the consignment will be partially assembled in Batu Gajah, Malaysia.

The Class 93 ETS is utilised in the electrified section of the West Coast Line, from JB Sentral to Padang Besar. It has cut journey times significantly, covering Padang Besar from Kuala Lumpur within four hours and fifteen minutes, with 5 stops at hand, while the Kuala Lumpur-Penang leg can be covered within 3 hours.

Another 9 were ordered in 2019 and delivery finished in 2020. They are branded as ETS 2 and offer a business class coach as well as a redesigned standard class accommodation.

== Design and Construction ==
The KTM Class 93 is a custom-built train engineered to high-speed metre gauge operation. Dubbed the "Malaysian Bullet Train", or "Pocket Rocket", it features a streamline sloped head, with better aerodynamic efficiency relative to previous KTM rail classes. It is expected to be one of the fastest trains operating on metre gauge track. Relative to KTM standard meter gauge bogies, special higher strength materials were used in bogie construction. This is done in order to damp and sustain the higher stresses incurred by going at high speed over narrow gauge.

The train uses a standard lightweight aluminum body. The train is capable of starting at 0.7 m/s^{2} (2.3 ft/s^{2}), thus being able to accelerate from 0 to 160 km/h (99 mph) in two minutes. The speed and width are limited by the narrow, higher speed and wider trains requiring the use of at minimum standard gauge tracks, currently only used in Malaysia by the Rapid KL lines and the Express Rail Link, although the East Coast Rail Link and the proposed Kuala Lumpur–Singapore high-speed rail would use standard gauge. It is capable of stopping within a minute and away at speed. The rail class also features standard safety systems such as a hotbox alarm system installation, horizontal stabilizer, vehicle health monitoring systems and other advanced safety equipment. Unlike the earlier KTM Class 91, the KTM Class 93 reportedly sources all its components from China, with the exception of the on-board equipment (such as is the ATP) and the traction system which is sourced from the Chinese subsidiary of Bombardier and Siemens respectively.

The mechanical and exterior design of the original Class 93/1 and the newer Class 93/2 are almost identical, the only difference being the exterior livery. Sometimes the train livery are ads.

== On-board service ==
=== Class 93/1 ===
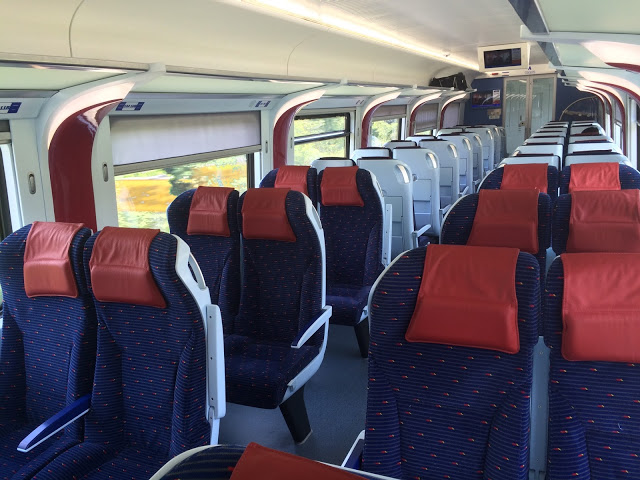
Standard Class interior on Class 93/1

Standard Class: The seats are arranged in a 2+2 fashion, and have blue seat covers and red headrests. Each seat has a power outlet and a tray table. The train features standard intercity offerings such as luggage racks, a toilet and prayer area within the length of an individual 6-car set. Since these trains operate in a tropical climate, all carriages are fully air conditioned. The trains are also equipped with LTE-enabled WiFi throughout but currently it has not been turned on yet.

=== Class 93/2 ===
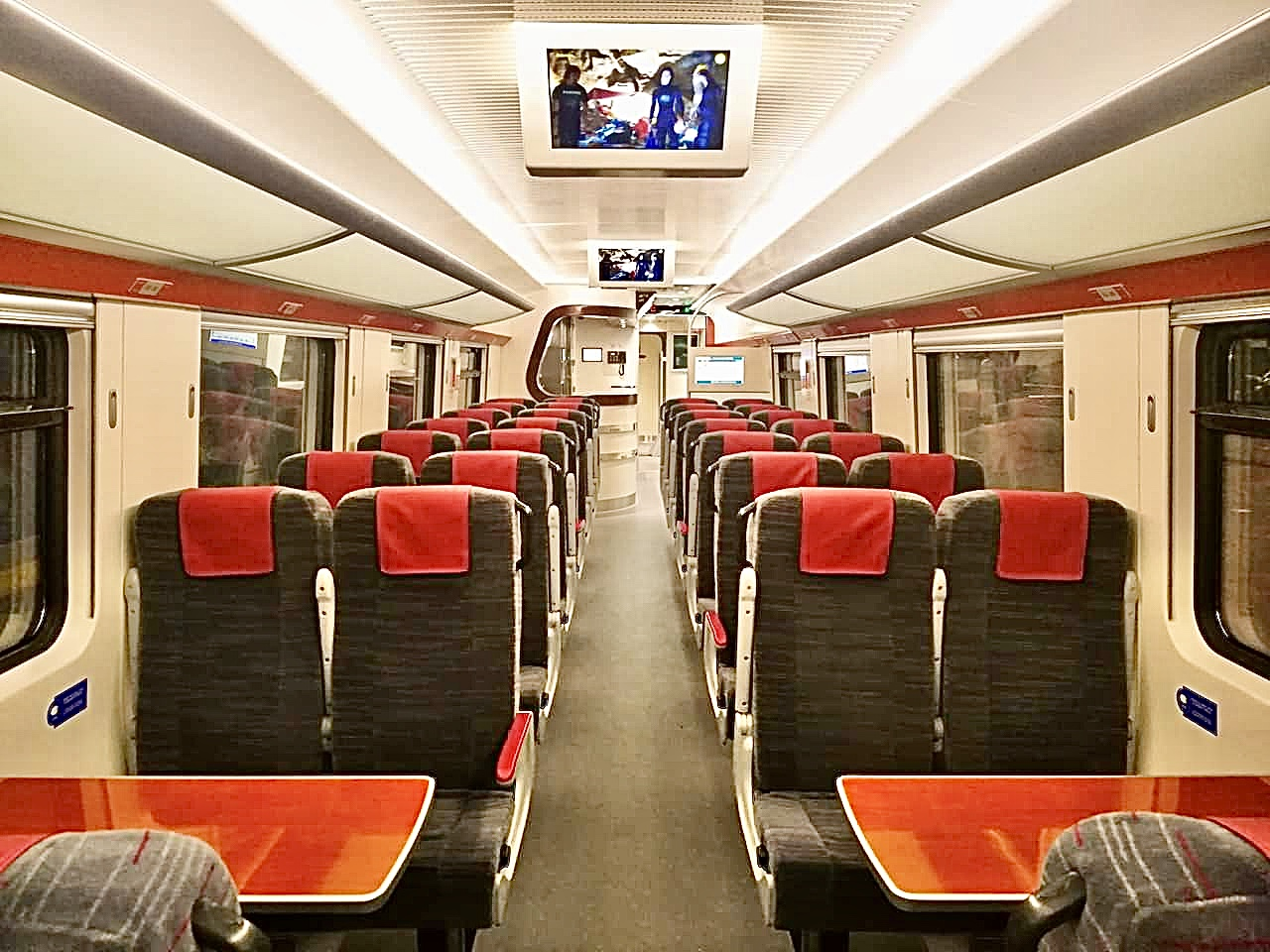
Standard Class interior on Class 93/2

Standard Class: The facilities are very similar to those offered on the first batch, with a few improvements. In addition to the transverse seating layout, there are cluster seats which face each other. Such seats have a table between them. The seats have grey seat covers and red headrests. Toilets have changing tables for infants.

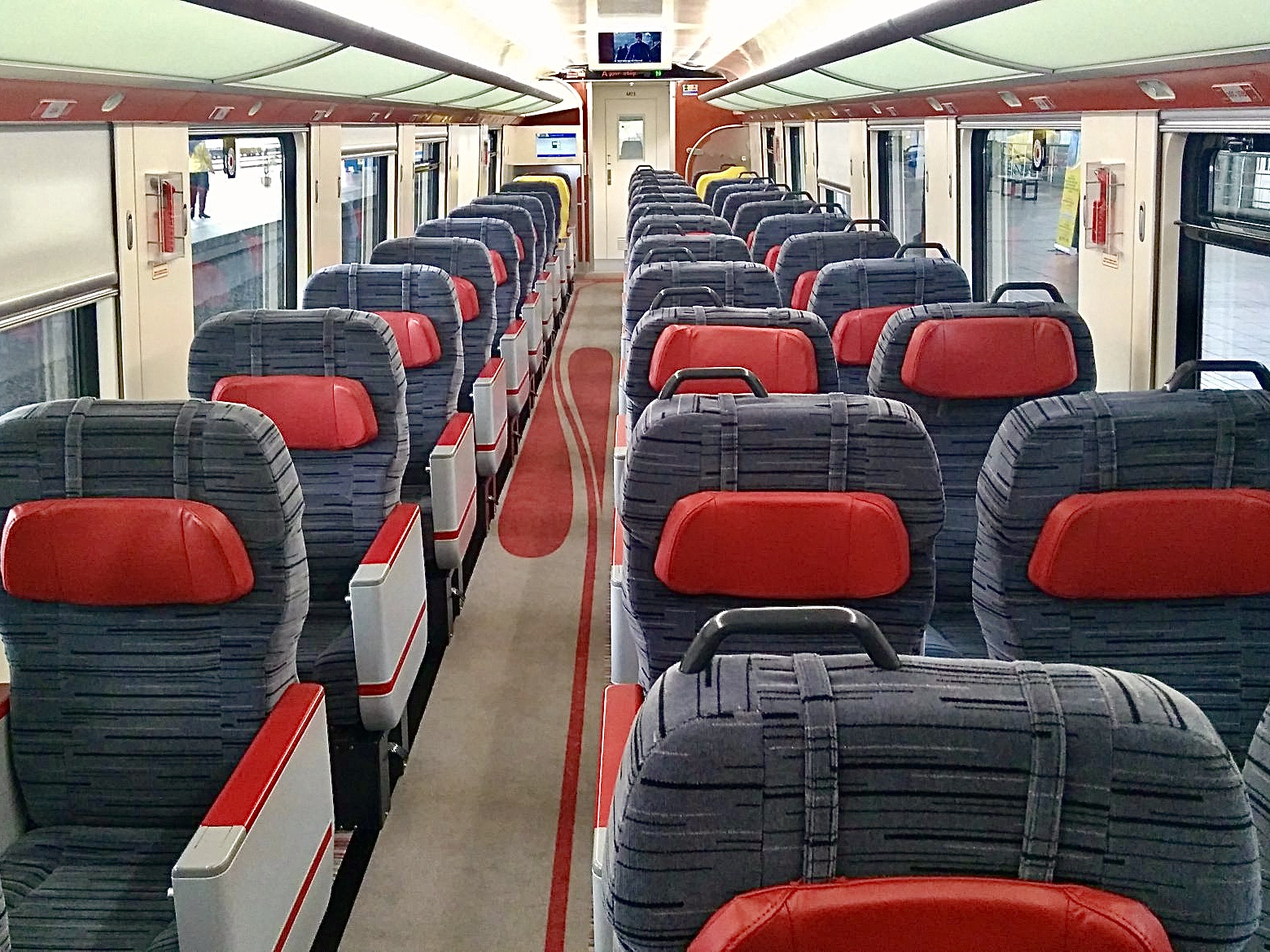
Business Class interior on Class 93/2

Business Class: The Business class accommodation and service marks a step up from the standard class. In addition to the facilities already enjoyed in standard class, there are additional features otherwise not seen on the standard class. The seats are arranged in a 2+1 configuration and are wider and able to recline up to 45 degrees. The seats can be rotated to face any direction. Each seat has its own on demand video screen for in-train entertainment. Wi-Fi is complimentary for business class passengers. Each coach has its own steward or stewardess, which the passenger can summon from his seat. On-board dining is included in the fare. Passengers are given their own amenity kit.

== Testing and Commissioning ==
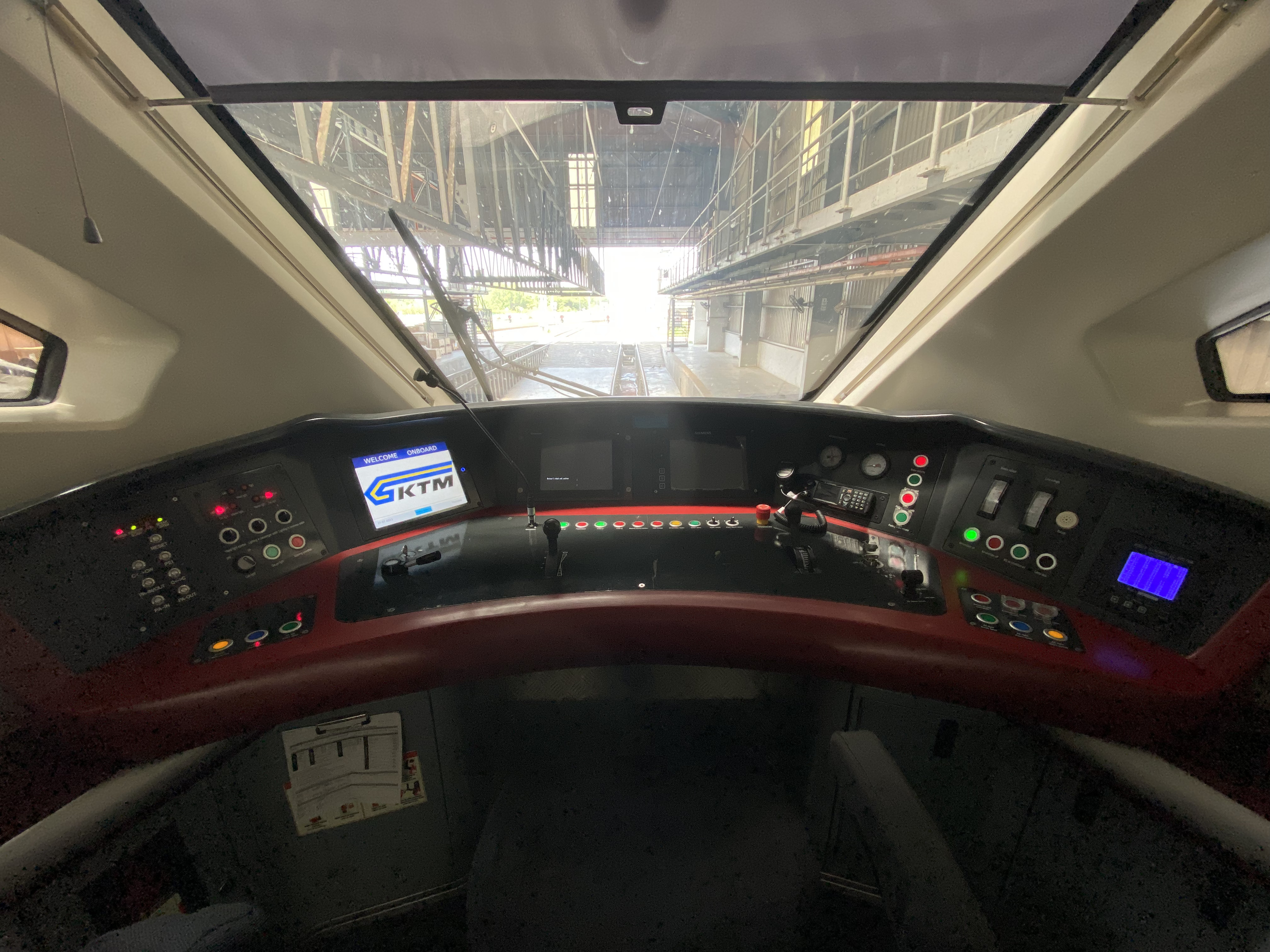
The cab of Class 93/2

Before launch, all new train sets must undergo and pass compulsory testing, in this they are required to go 10,000 km (6,214 mi) without logging a single fault. The train set will undergo testing for its automatic train protection system (ATP), other components tested included the propulsion system, the brakes, air-conditioning, door operations, auxiliary power supply, suspension, train control and management system, couplers, and even the wipers.

Delays to the July launch were attributed to ATP warnings whenever ETS201 enters the Butterworth branch line. Thus, regulatory approval was delayed until October. The first 4 sets went into service on 10 October 2015, operating between Padang Besar and Gemas on the ETS Ekspres service. As of 2016, all 10 sets from the first batch are in service.

== Procurement ==
The purchase of KTM class 93 was made under a bilateral trade agreement between the Malaysian Ministry of Transport and the Chinese Transport Ministry with the contract signed in September 2013. On top of this, the agreement includes a 2-year maintenance agreement. It also includes various aspects including financing, construction of transportation facilities and other turnkey contracts as well as the transfer of advanced technology and management methods.

The procurement of the Class 93 includes a clause that future sets of the series would be assembled in Malaysia. A CRRC facility for maintaining and assembling was commissioned in Batu Gajah, Malaysia to assist on this end. In April 2017 a further nine set of ETS trains were ordered. Each train set costs RM50 million.

== Launch date ==
The first of the 6-car Class 93 EMUs entered service on 3 September 2015. ETS 201 began service by operating the 5AM service from Ipoh to Kuala Lumpur Sentral (EG9301). The ETS then operated the 9.30AM KL Sentral to Padang Besar service (EG9208).

The second batch of 9 train sets, Class 93/2, entered service on 11 October 2019.

== Formation ==
Each train set is formed as follows, with cars numbered alphabetically (A to F) instead of numerically, and with Car 1 (A) facing south (KL Sentral, Segamat, JB Sentral) and Car 6 (F) facing north (KL Sentral, Padang Besar, Butterworth) The first car of Class 93/2 is equipped with 36 business class seats.

Seating capacity
Car No.	A	B	C	D	E	F
Class 93/1	58	60	42	42	60	58
Class 93/2	36	60	54	42 (+4)	60	60
Designation	Mc	Tp	M	M	Tp	Mc
Features		Toilet	Cafe	Toilet	Toilet	

Set Designation	1	2	3	4	5	6	Status	Launch Date	Assembled in
Class 93/1 ETS 201	C9301	T9301	M9301	M9302	T9302	C9302	In Service	3 Sep 2015	China
Class 93/1 ETS 202	C9303	T9303	M9303	M9304	T9304	C9304	In Service	Sep 2015	China
Class 93/1 ETS 203	C9305	T9305	M9305	M9306	T9306	C9306	In Service	7 Oct 2015	China
Class 93/1 ETS 204	C9307	T9307	M9307	M9308	T9308	C9308	In Service	10 Oct 2015	China
Class 93/1 ETS 205	C9309	T9309	M9309	M9310	T9310	C9310	In Service	Dec 2015	Malaysia
Class 93/1 ETS 206	C9311	T9311	M9311	M9312	T9312	C9312	In Service	Jan 2016	Malaysia
Class 93/1 ETS 207	C9313	T9313	M9313	M9314	T9314	C9314	In Service	Feb 2016	Malaysia
Class 93/1 ETS 208	C9315	T9315	M9315	M9316	T9316	C9316	In Service	2016	Malaysia
Class 93/1 ETS 209	C9317	T9317	M9317	M9318	T9318	C9318	In Service	2016	Malaysia
Class 93/1 ETS 210	C9319	T9319	M9319	M9320	T9320	C9320	In Service	2016	Malaysia
Class 93/2 ETS 211	C9321	T9321	M9321	M9322	T9322	C9322	In Service	11 Oct 2019	Malaysia
Class 93/2 ETS 212	C9323	T9323	M9323	M9324	T9324	C9324	In Service	2019	Malaysia
Class 93/2 ETS 213	C9325	T9325	M9325	M9326	T9326	C9326	In Service	2020	Malaysia
Class 93/2 ETS 214	C9327	T9327	M9327	M9328	T9328	C9328	In Service	2020	Malaysia
Class 93/2 ETS 215	C9329	T9329	M9329	M9330	T9330	C9330	In Service	2020	Malaysia
Class 93/2 ETS 216	C9331	T9331	M9331	M9332	T9332	C9332	In Service	2020	Malaysia
Class 93/2 ETS 217	C9333	T9333	M9333	M9334	T9334	C9334	In Service	2020	Malaysia
Class 93/2 ETS 218	C9335	T9335	M9335	M9336	T9336	C9336	In Service	2020	Malaysia
Class 93/2 ETS 219	C9337	T9337	M9337	M9338	T9338	C9338	In Service	2020	Malaysia

Cars 2 and 5 are equipped with a double-arm Z-shaped pantograph.

== Gallery ==
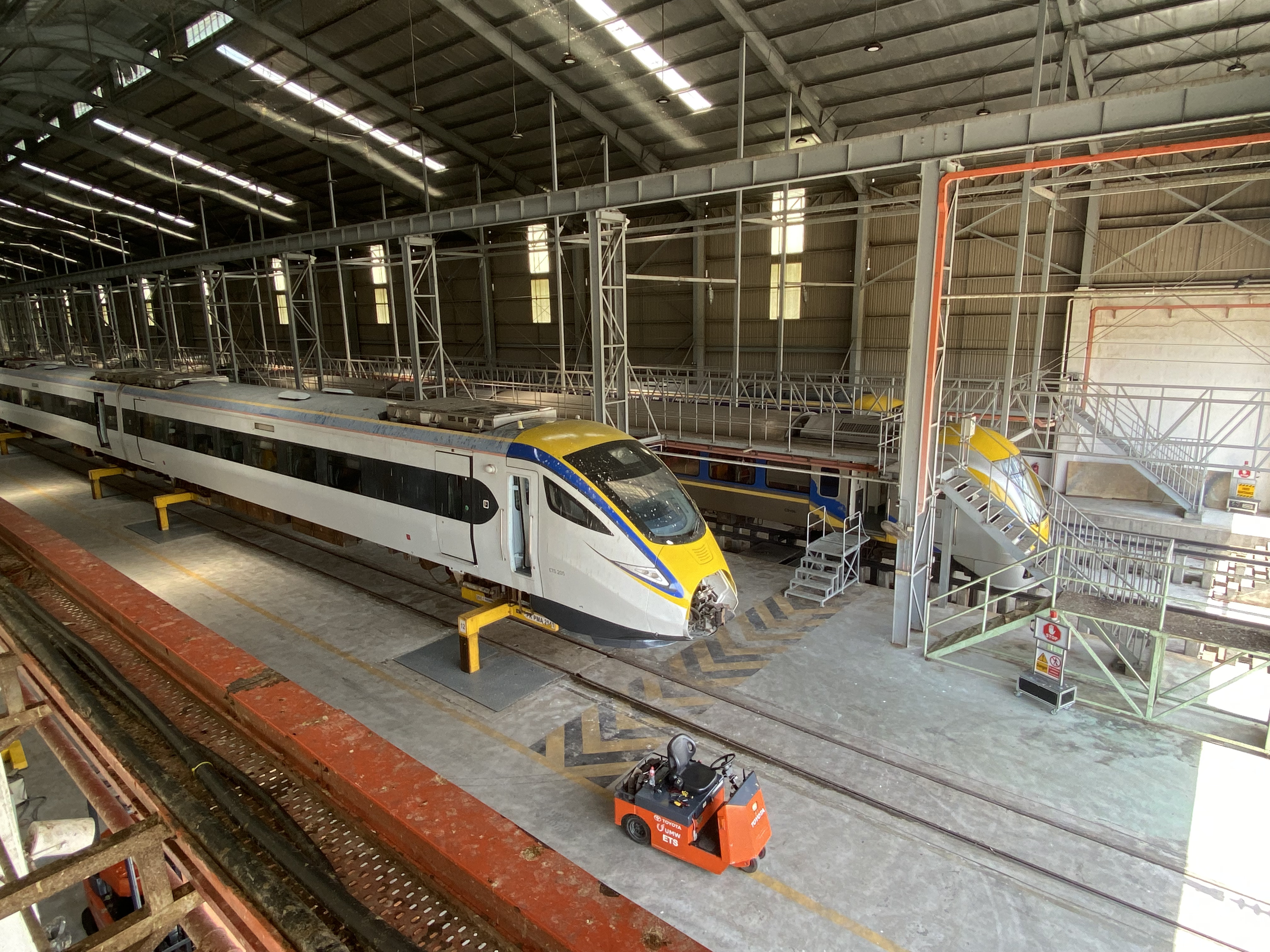
ETS Class 93/1 and Class 91 resting at depot

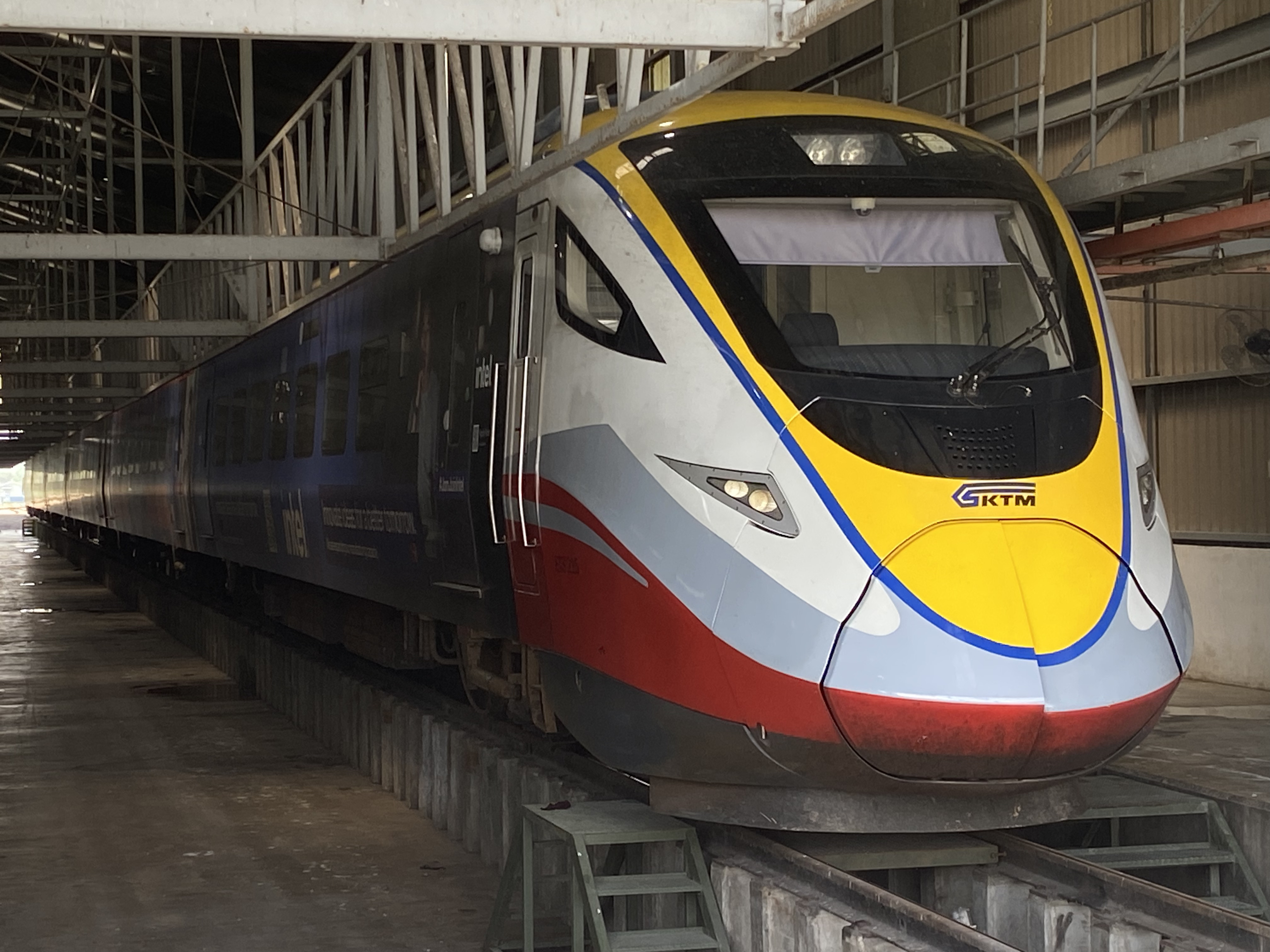
ETS Class 93/2 resting at depot

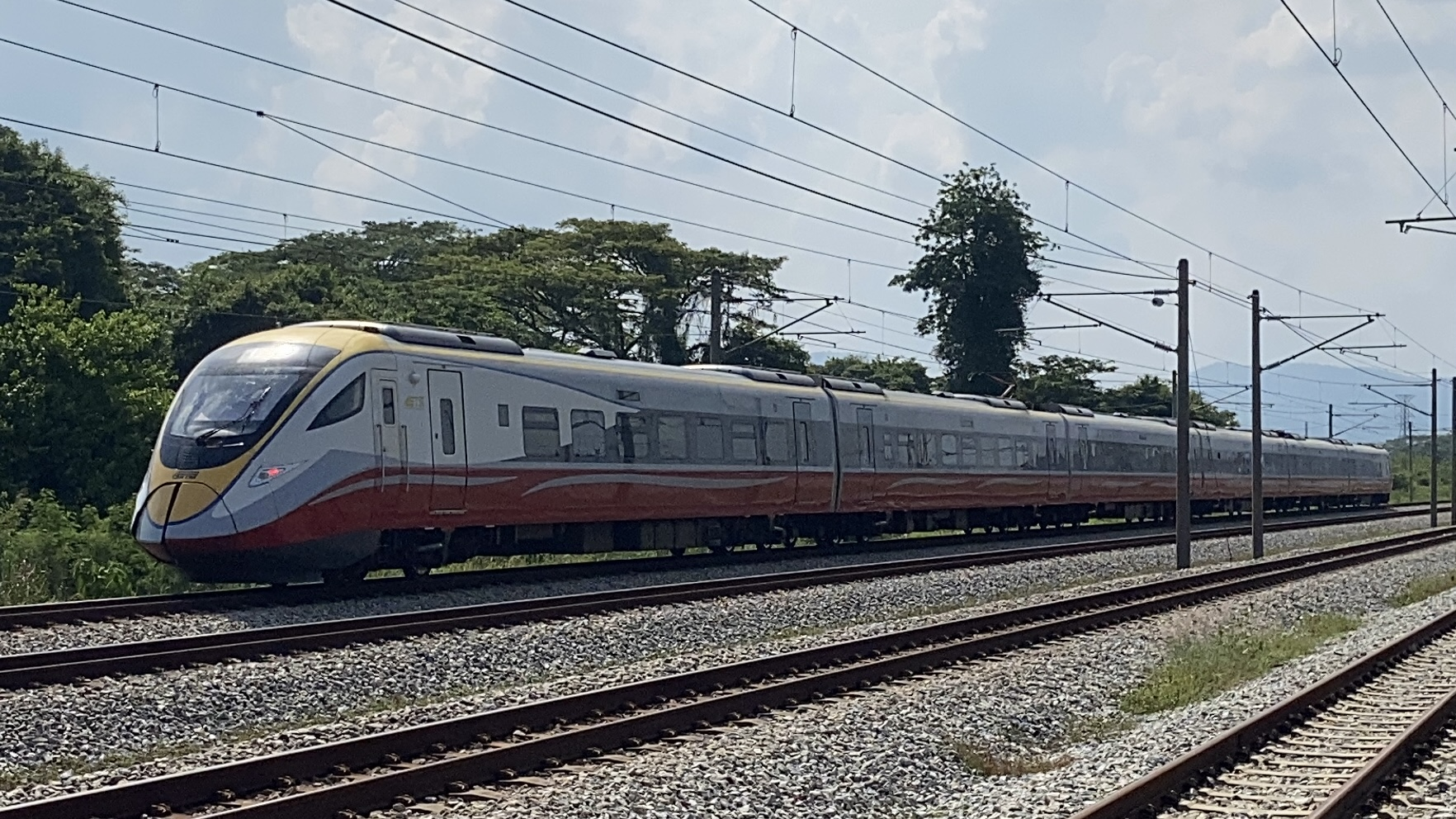
A Class 93/2 heading towards Batu Gajah railway station
