= KTM Class 61 =

Malaysian train class

Class 61
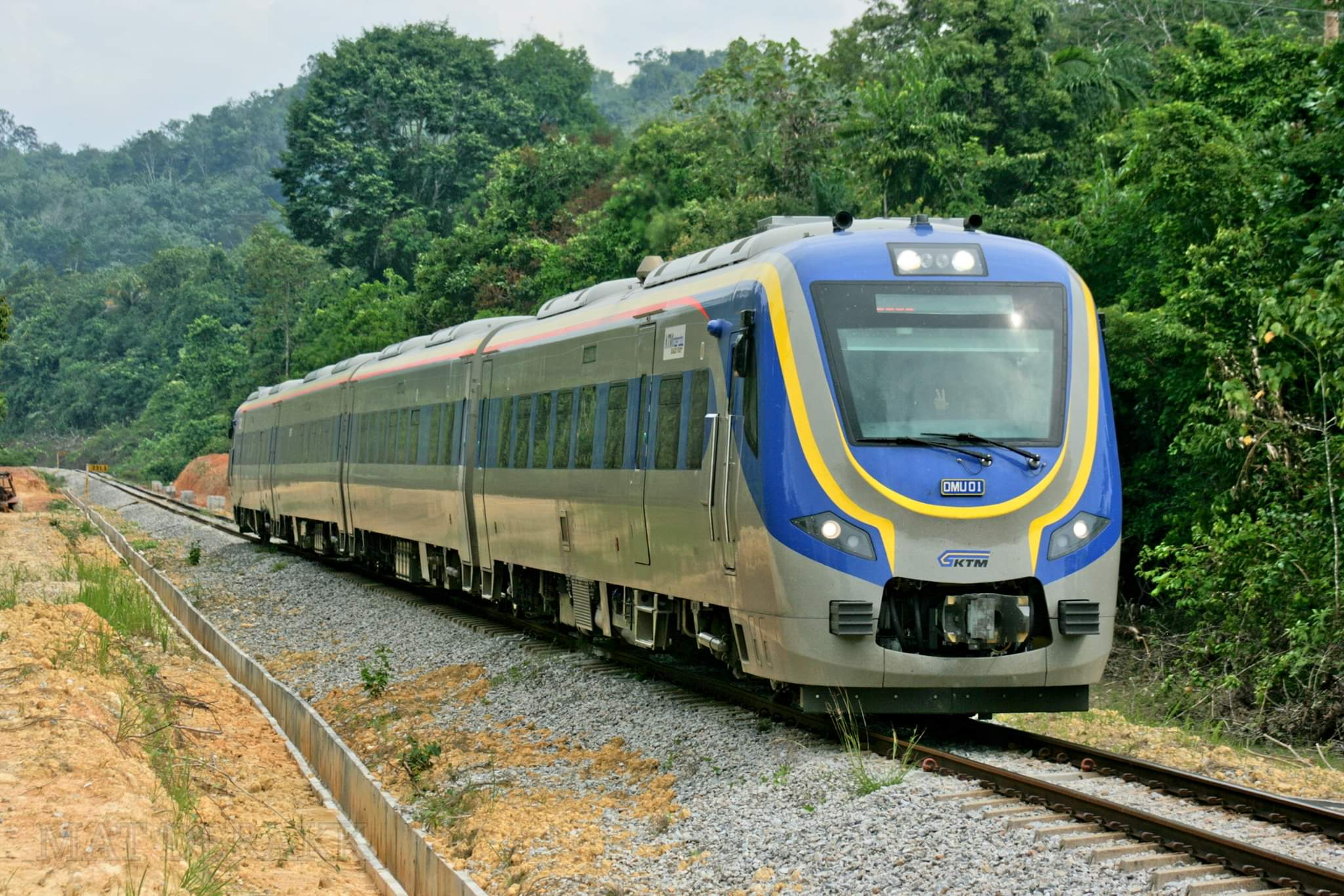
- Class 61 DMU 01 "Tumpat"
- Stock type: Diesel multiple unit
- In service: 11 April 2021–present
- Manufacturer: CRRC Zhuzhou Locomotive
- Number built: 52 cars (13 sets)
- Number in service: 13 sets
- Formation: 4 per trainset D1–M1–M2–D2
- Capacity: 360 (218 seats) for regional model; 200 seats for long-distance model
- Operator: Keretapi Tanah Melayu

Specifications
- Train length: 93.5 metres (306 ft 9 in)
- Width: 2.75 metres (9 ft 0 in)
- Height: 3.87 metres (12 ft 8 in)
- Maximum speed: 140 km/h (87 mph) (design); 120 km/h (75 mph) (service)
- Weight: 176.92 t
- Axle load: ≤ 14 t
- Acceleration: 0.8 m/s^{2} (2.6 ft/s^{2})
- Track gauge: 1,000 mm (3 ft 3 3/8 in) metre gauge

The KTM Class 61 is a diesel multiple unit operated by Keretapi Tanah Melayu for KTM Intercity services on non electrified sections of the KTM West Coast railway line and the KTM East Coast railway line.

== Background ==
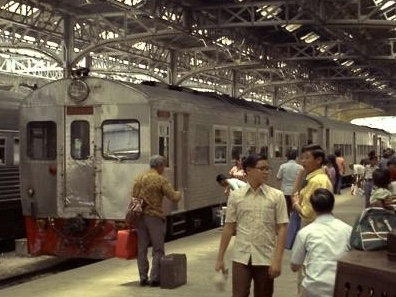
Hitachi and Kisha Seizo-built Railcar used in the 1960s and 1970s

The idea of using DMUs is not new to KTMB. In 1960, the company operated diesel railcars on short-distance services. The railcars operated in multiple-unit formations until the mid-1970s, when they were converted into trailers and coupled with conventional diesel locomotives. In the 1980s, KTM ordered railbuses for similar services, but these services ended in the 1990s. Secondhand DMUs were also proposed for KTM Komuter services to make up for the shortage of EMUs, but in the end, new Class 92 EMUs were ordered instead.

== Procurement ==
In 2015, the Business Times reported that KTMB had signed a deal for DMUs with Majestic Engineering, in which the DMUs will be supplied by CRRC. KTMB confirmed its intentions to get DMUs in 2016, pointing out its higher speeds compared to locomotive hauled trains. In 2017, KTMB formally announced the procurement of 13 DMUs along with 9 ETS sets from CRRC.

The trains were constructed from 2018 to 2020 by CRRC Zhuzhou Locomotive. The first two sets were built in CRRC’s factory in Zhuzhou, China, whereas the remaining eleven were built in CRRC’s factory in Batu Gajah, Malaysia.

== Description ==
The trains have a design speed of 140 km/h (87 mph) and are expected to operate at up to 120 km/h (75 mph). They are equipped with graphene-based supercapacitors for storing braking energy and two MAN powerpacks. The diesel engines can be replaced with fuel cells to reach zero emissions operation. The trains are fitted with a Wireless Train Tracker tool for location detection.

Since the trains are used on non-upgraded sections where platform heights are lower, the trains are fitted with retractable steps to aid passengers in boarding. The train bodies themselves are specified to meet the European EN15227 crashworthiness standard.

== Formation ==
Set Designation	Callsign	Status
Class 61 DMU 01	"Tumpat"	Operational
Class 61 DMU 02	"Kota Bharu"	Operational
Class 61 DMU 03		Operational
Class 61 DMU 04	"Tanah Merah"	Operational
Class 61 DMU 05	"Kuala Krai"	Operational
Class 61 DMU 06		Operational
Class 61 DMU 07	"Pasir Mas"	Operational
Class 61 DMU 08		Operational
Class 61 DMU 09		Operational
Class 61 DMU 10		Operational
Class 61 DMU 11		Operational
Class 61 DMU 12		Operational
Class 61 DMU 13		Operational

== Features ==
The trains feature digital passenger information systems, a prayer room and a light catering bar. Nine of the thirteen sets will have a parcel storage area and have commuter style seating i.e. a combination of transverse and longitudinal seating layouts. Such trains are suited for regional services such as the Shuttle Timur service. The remaining four sets have 2+2 transverse seating and are suited to long distance travel.

== Service history ==
KTMB held a launch party for the new trains on 11 April 2021, inaugurating DMU service between Tumpat, Gua Musang and Kuala Lipis. From 21 February 2022, the trains were fully utilised on the east coast line with the opening of the shuttle timuran 35up/38dn from Kuala Lipis to Gemas.
