= CRRC Zhuzhou Locomotive =

Company in China

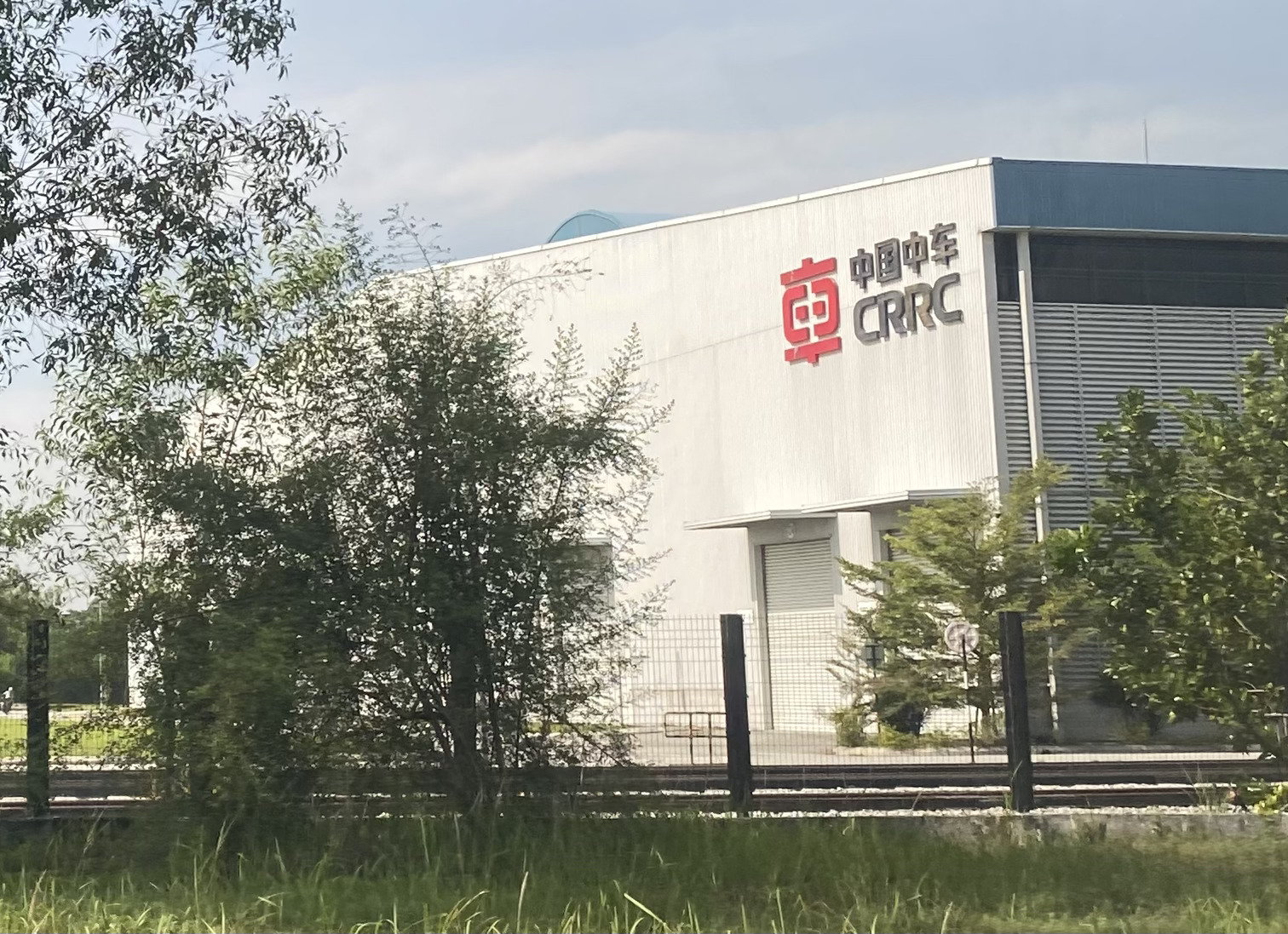
- The factory of CRRC Zhuzhou at Batu Gajah, Perak under the joint venture between China and Malaysia
- Native name: 中车株洲电力机车有限公司
- Formerly: CSR Zhuzhou Electric Locomotive
- Type: Subsidiary
- Industry: Locomotive and rolling stock manufacturing
- Predecessor: Zhuzhou Electric Lomocomotive Works
- Founded: 1936 (predecessor); 31 August 2005; 21 years ago
- Headquarters: Zhuzhou, Hunan, China
- Owner: CRRC
- Parent: CRRC
- Subsidiaries: in Zhejiang, Luoyang, Wuhan, Nanning, Urumqi
- Website: crrcgc.cc/zj

CRRC Zhuzhou Locomotive Co., Ltd.
- Simplified Chinese: 中车株洲电力机车有限公司
- Traditional Chinese: 中車株洲電力機車有限公司
- Hanyu Pinyin: Zhōngchē Zhūzhōu Diànlì Jīchē Yǒuxiàn Gōngsī
- Literal meaning: CRRC Zhuzhou Electric Locomotive Co., Ltd.
Transcriptions
Standard Mandarin
- Hanyu Pinyin: Zhōngchē Zhūzhōu Diànlì Jīchē Yǒuxiàn Gōngsī

CRRC Zhuzhou Locomotive
- Simplified Chinese: 中车株机
- Traditional Chinese: 中車株機
- Hanyu Pinyin: Zhōngchē Zhūjī
Transcriptions
Standard Mandarin
- Hanyu Pinyin: Zhōngchē Zhūjī

CRRC Zhuzhou Locomotive Co., Ltd. is one of the electric locomotive manufacturers in China. It is one of the subsidiaries of CRRC.

== History ==
=== Predecessor ===
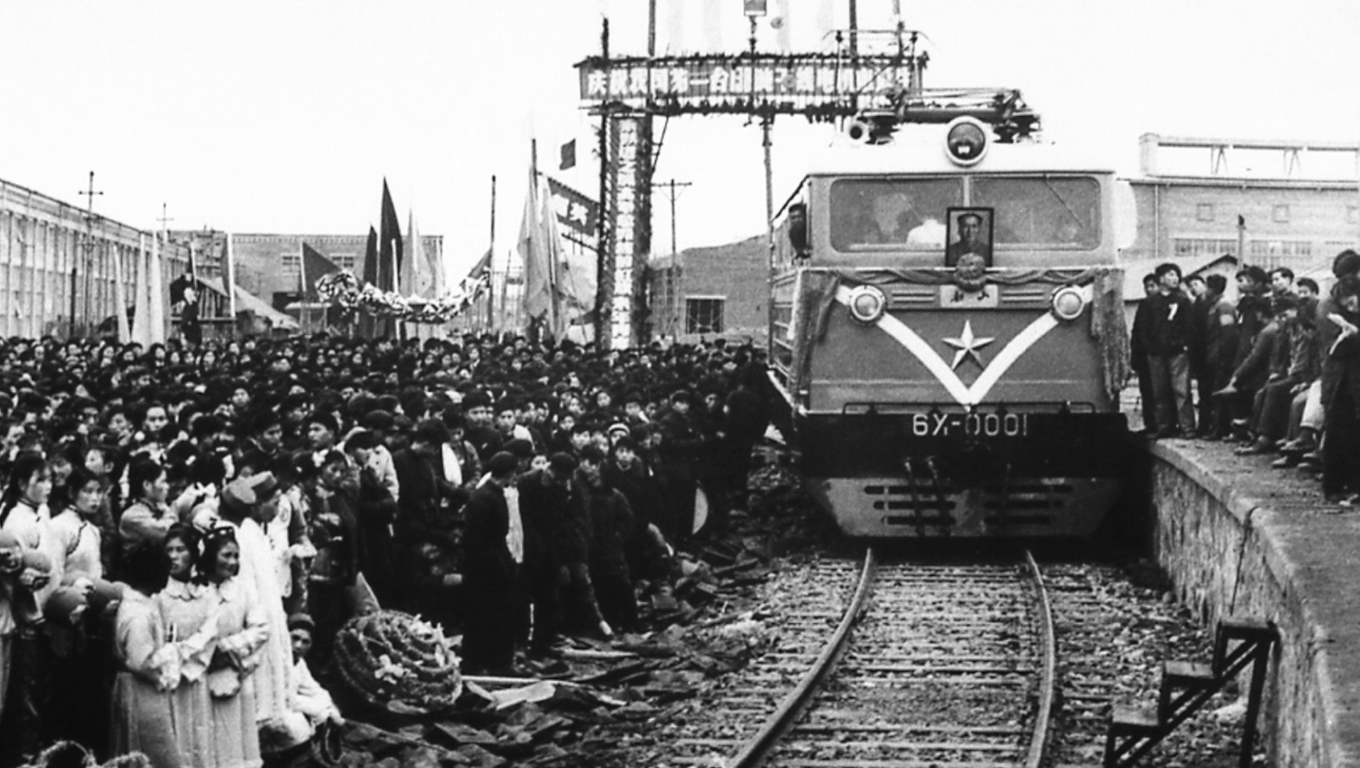
6Y1-0001 rolled out in 1958 as the first mainline electric locomotive of China

Zhuzhou Electric Locomotive Works was founded in 1936.

=== CRRC Zhuzhou Locomotive Co. ===
On 31 August 2005, CSR Group Zhuzhou Electric Locomotive Co was spun-off from the locomotive works; the original legal entity of the locomotive works became an intermediate holding company for CSR Group only. After the formation of the listed company CSR Corporation, the limited company, CSR Group Zhuzhou Electric Locomotive, became part of the listed portion of the group, and the intermediate holding company remained unlisted. The limited company also renamed to CSR Zhuzhou Electric Locomotive Co.

In 2015 the company was renamed CRRC Zhuzhou Locomotive Co. In 2019, the locomotive manufacturing business of Vossloh was purchased.

== Subsidiaries ==
- CRRC Kuala Lumpur Maintenance Sdn Bhd (Formerly known as CSR Kuala Lumpur Maintenance Sdn Bhd)
- Vossloh Rolling Stock GmbH

== Joint ventures ==
Siemens Traction Equipment Ltd. (STEZ), is a joint venture between Siemens (50%), Zhuzhou CRRC Times Electric (30%) and CRRC Zhuzhou Locomotive (20%). It produces AC drive electric locomotives and AC locomotive traction components.

In September 2012, CSR Zhuzhou Locomotive agreed to build a factory at Batu Gajah in Malaysia.

It also has different joint ventures established with Siemens to build metro cars for the Guangzhou Metro Line 3, and to deliver 180 new HXD1 BoBo+BoBo EuroSprinter-based freight locomotives.

== Products ==
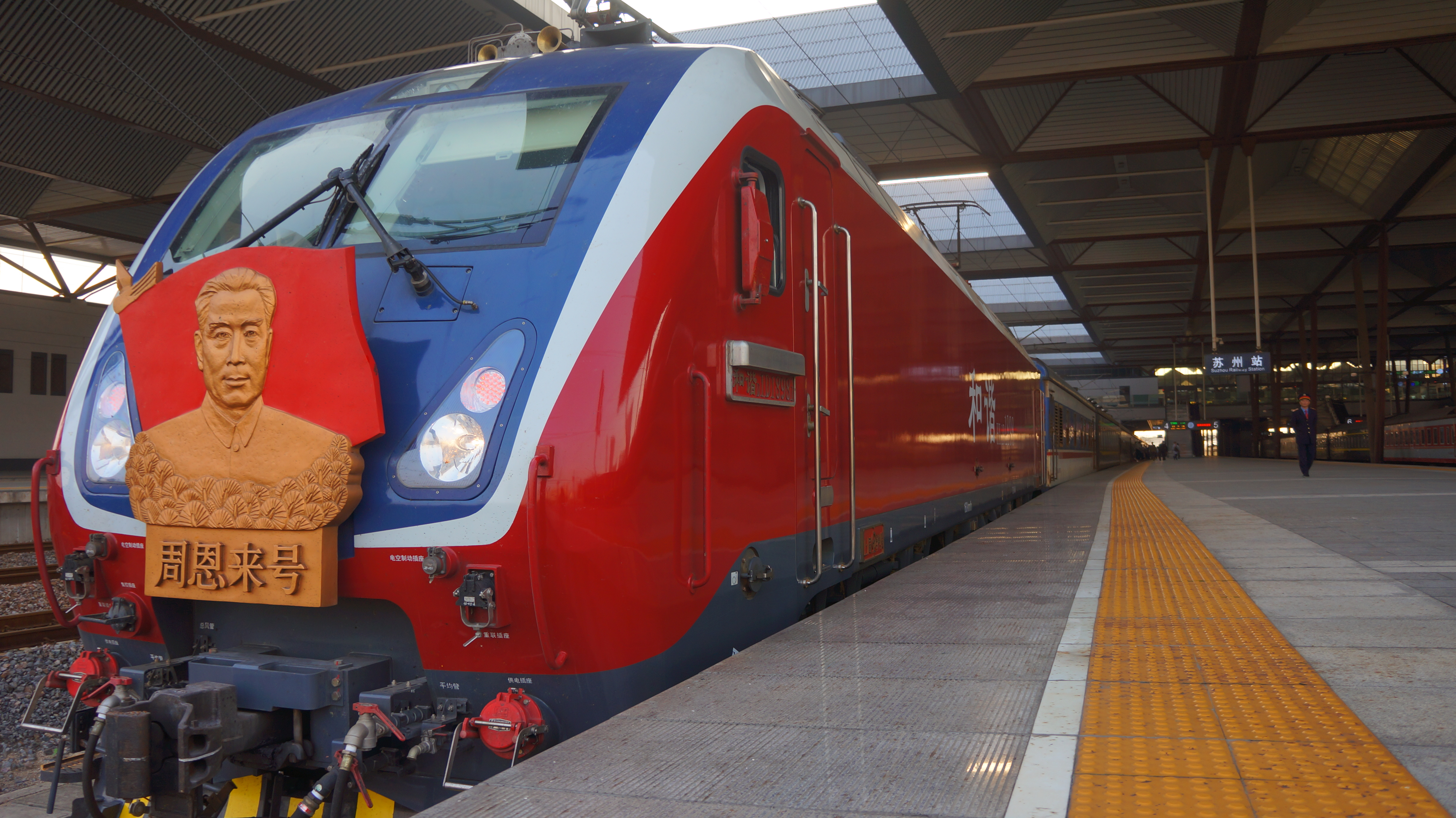
HXD1D-1898, the Zhuzhou-built locomotive named after Zhou Enlai, entered service in May 2015

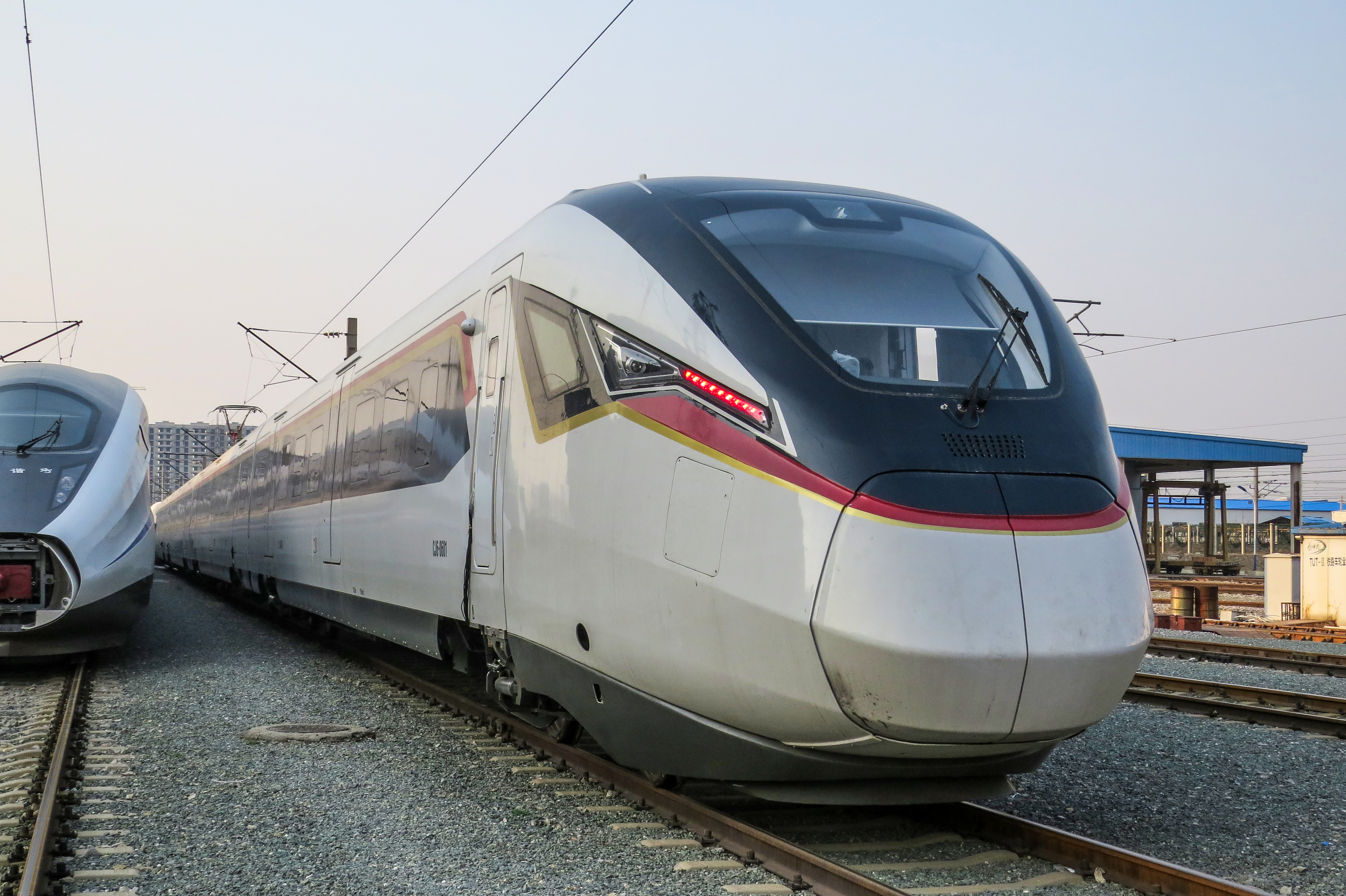
CJ6-0601, the Zhuzhou-built intercity rail speed up to 160 km/h (100 mph).

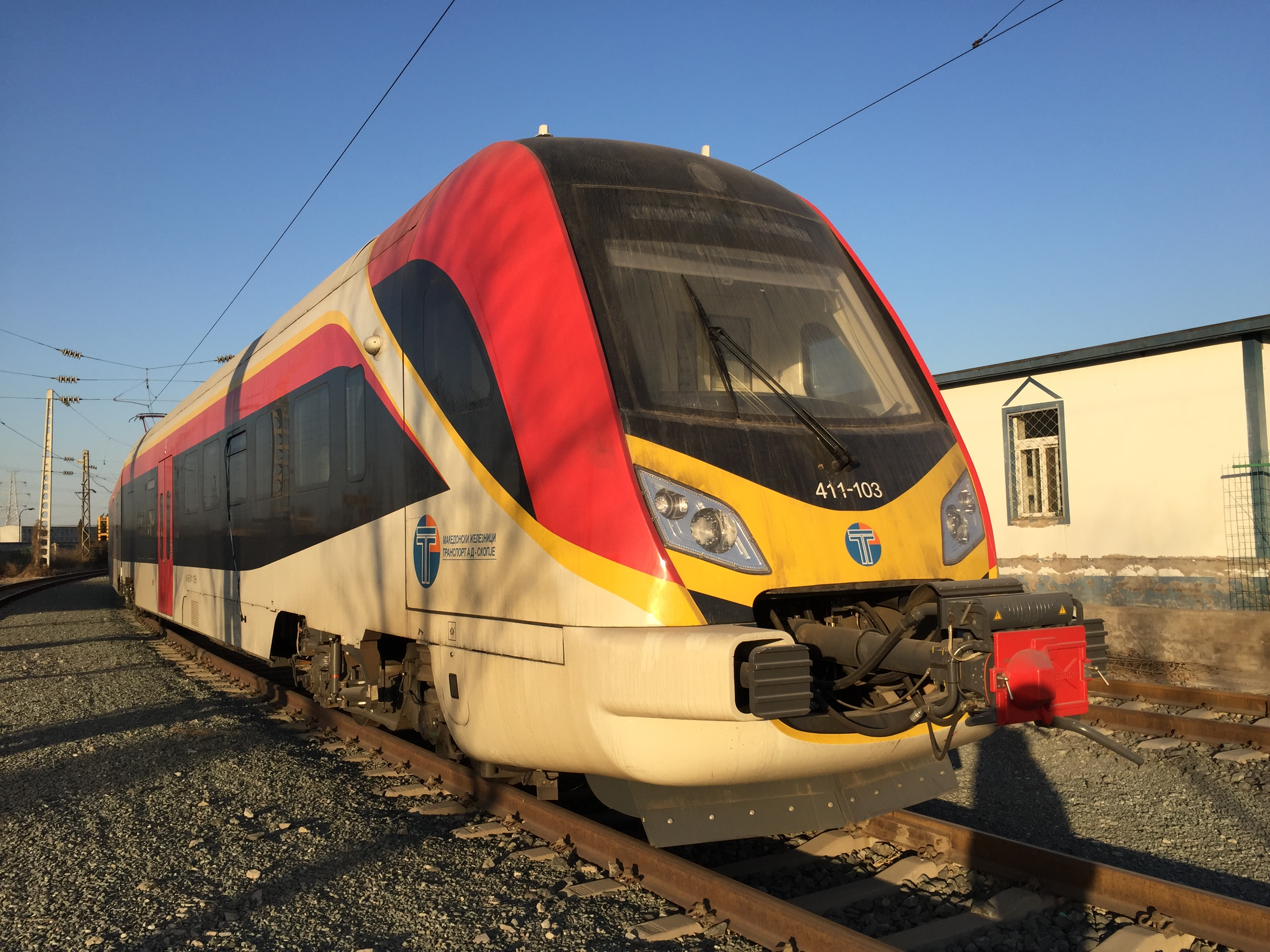
The MŽ 411 electric multiple unit built for Macedonian Railways

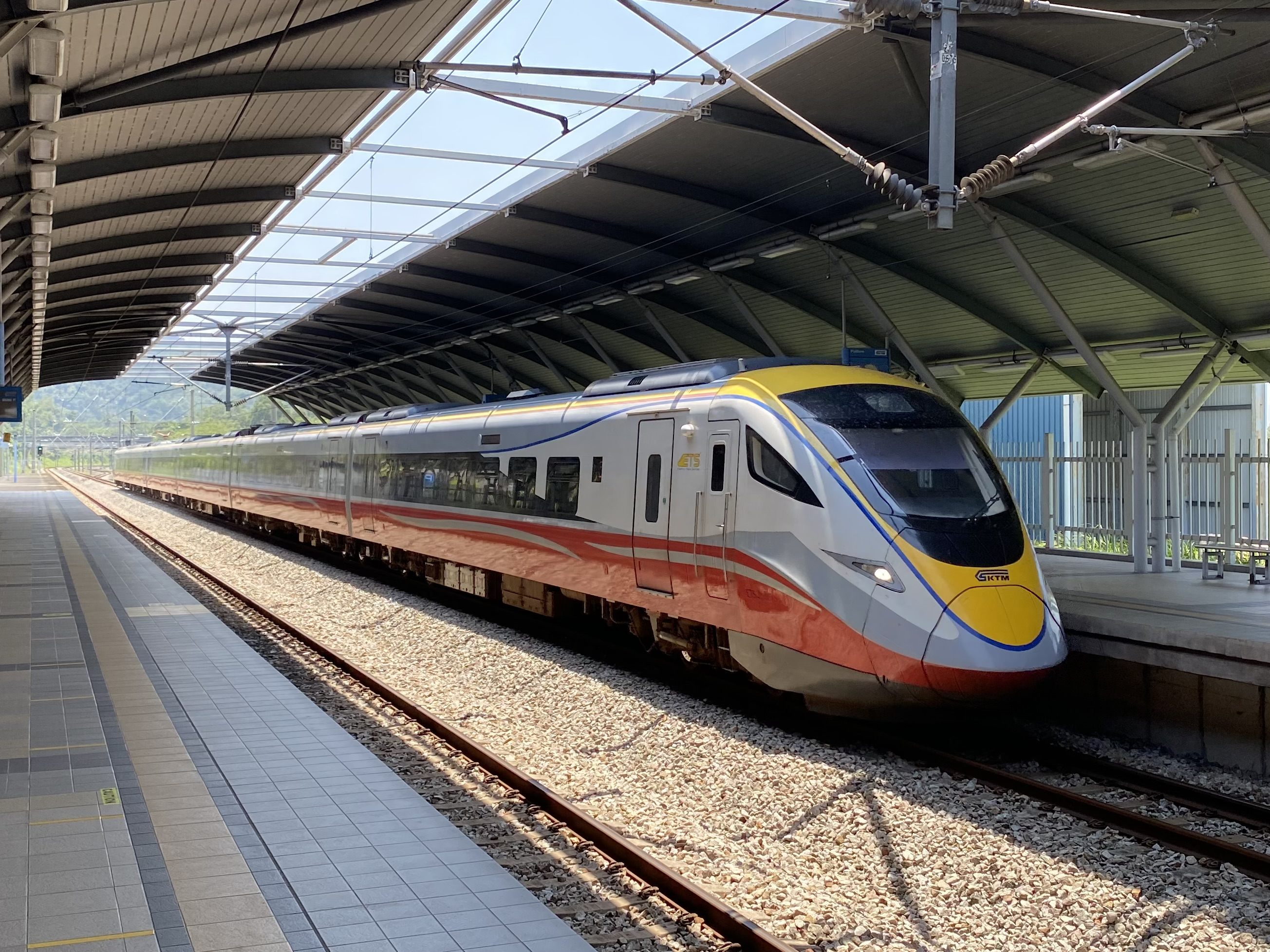
KTM Class 93 for KTM ETS

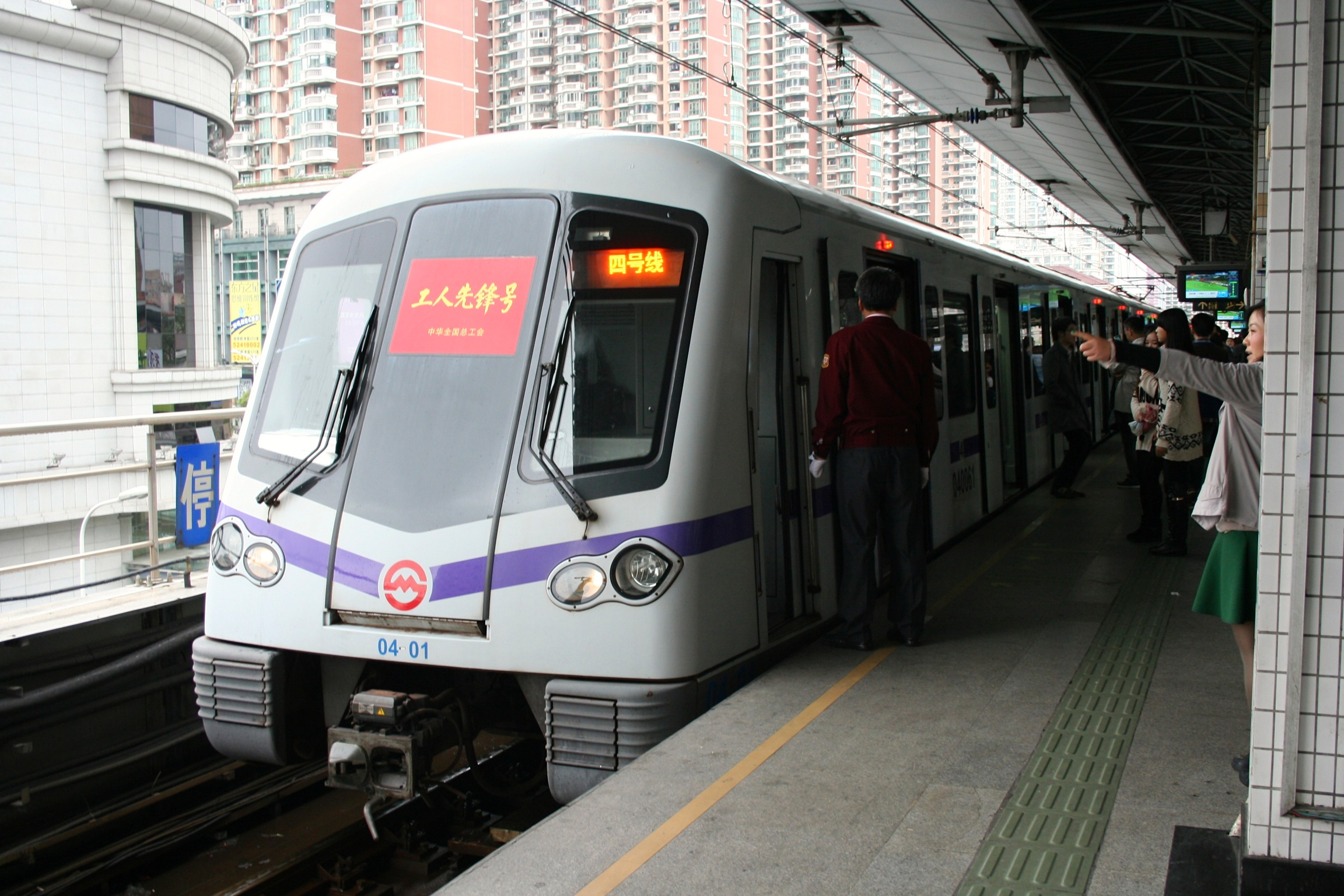
Shanghai Metro AC05 is the first Zhuzhou-built metro car model

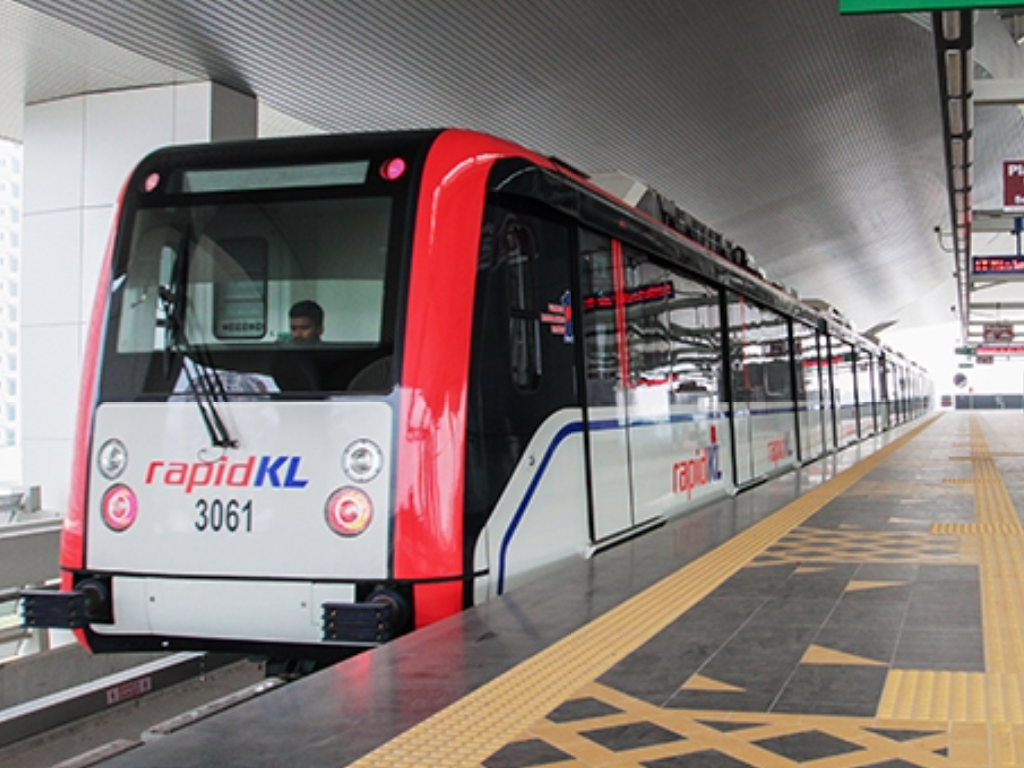
CRRC Zhuzhou LRV for Rapid KL

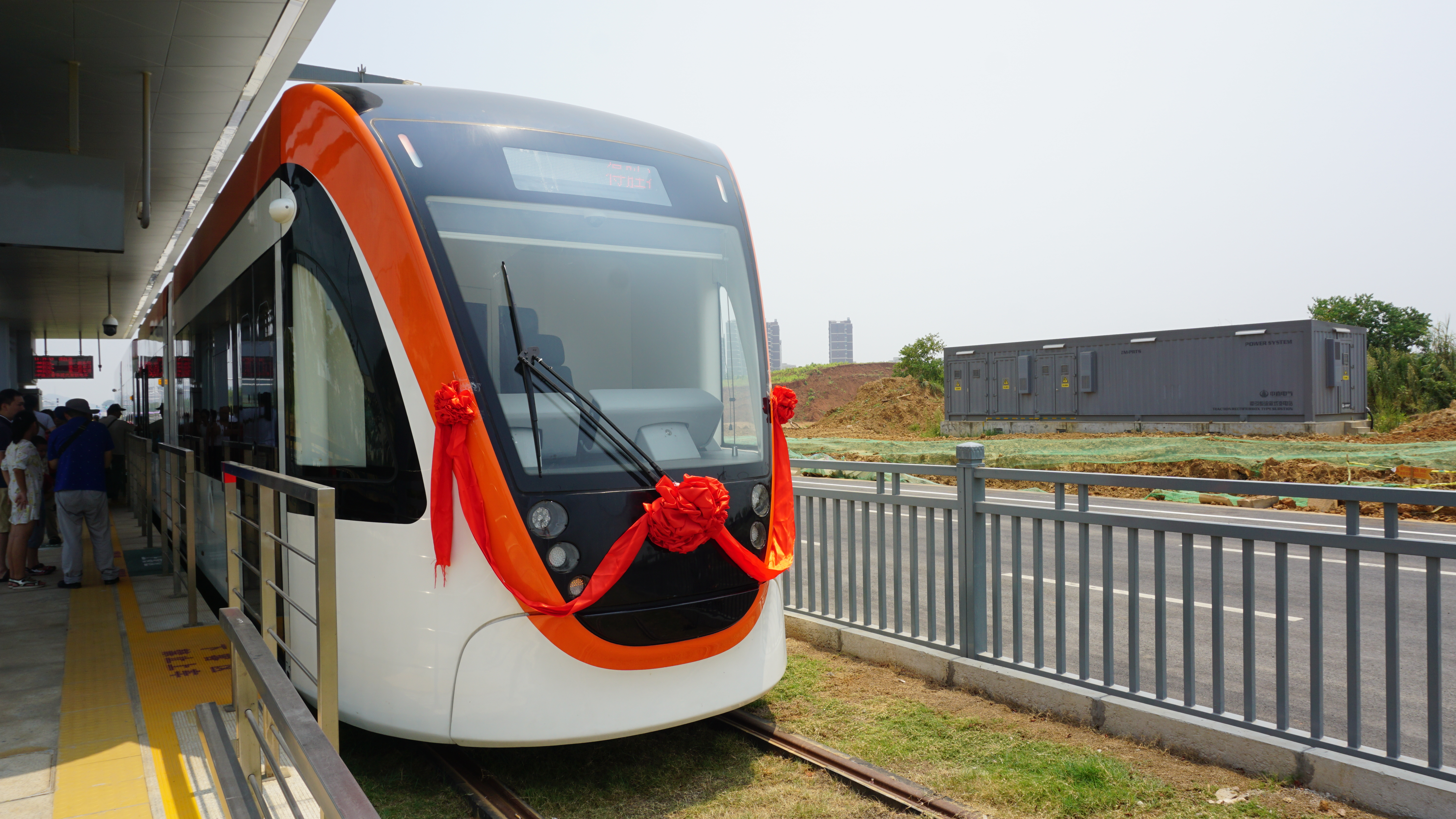
Wuhan Auto City T1 tram car

=== Electric locomotives ===
- Shaoshan series electric locomotives
  - SS1 inspired from USSR (archived) and French locomotive 6Y2
  - SS3 inspired from Japanese locomotive
  - SS4
  - SS5
  - SS6 – SS6B
  - SS8
  - SS9
- VVVF control electric locomotives
  - DJ "Gofront"
  - DJ1
  - DJ2 "Olympic Stars"
  - HXD1 licensed from Siemens
  - HXD1B
  - HXD1C
  - HXD1D
  - HXD1G
- Export products
  - TM1 (Iran)
  - TM2 (Iran)
  - TM3 (Iran)
  - O’ Z-Y type electric locomotive (Uzbekistan)
  - KZ4A (Kazakhstan)
  - TFR Class 20E AC/DC electric locomotives (South Africa)

=== Electric Multiple Unit (EMU) ===
- ZEMU02 (Panda)
- ZEMU03 (Sirius)

=== Inter City commuter ===
- DJJ1 Blue Arrow (archived)
- DJJ2 China Star (archived)
- CJ6
- Changsha–Zhuzhou–Xiangtan intercity railway
- KTM Class 92 (Malaysia)
- KTM Class 93 (Malaysia)
- KTM Class 94 (Malaysia)
- KTM Class 61 (Malaysia)
- KTM Class 84 (Malaysia)
- MŽ 411 for Macedonian Railways
- East Coast Rail Link (Malaysia)

=== Metro ===
- Shanghai Metro (01A04 additional cars, 01A06, 01A07, 02A05, 04A01,11A01, 16A01 and 18A01)
- Guangzhou Metro (Line 2, Line 3, Line 7, Line 8, Line 9, Line 14, Line 21)
- Shenzhen Metro (Line 1, Line 2, Line 5, Line 8, Line 11, Line 16 )
- Wuhan Metro Class B cars(Line 1, Line 2, Line 4); Class A cars (Line 6, Line 7, Line 8 and Line 11) at Jiangxia District near Wuhan. Yangluo line will use the same Class A cars.
- Ningbo Rail Transit lines 1, 2, 3, 4 and 5
- Kunming Rail Transit lines 1, 2, 3 and 6
- Zhengzhou Metro lines 1, 2 and 5
- Rapid Metro Gurgaon
- Changsha Metro lines 1, 2, 3 and 4
- Wuxi Metro line 1
- Lahore Metro Orange Line, trains are each composed of five wagons and are automated and driverless. A standard Chinese "Type B" train-set consisting of 5 cars with 4 doors each used, that has a stainless steel body and illuminated by LED lighting. Each car has a nominal capacity of 200 seated and standing passengers at an average density of 5 persons per square metre with 20% of passengers seated and 80% standing. A total of 27 trains with 135 cars have been ordered for the system, at a cost of $1 billion. A total of 54 trains are expected to be in service by 2025. The trains powered by a 750-volt third rail.
- Nanning Rail Transit lines 1 & 2
- Ürümqi Metro line 1
- Istanbul Metro Line M11
- Ankara Metro lines M1-2–3 & M4
- Navi Mumbai Metro Line 1
- Metrorrey MM-20 series mixed-use trains, for lines 1, 2 and 3, sharing the same railways with previous Concarril/Bombardier MM-90X series, CAF's MM-93, Bombardier's MM-05 and SIEMENS-Duewag MM-80 (refurbished SIEMENS-Duewag U3 series trains from Frankfurt Metro).
- Mexico City Metro future line 1 trains model NM-22, part of a contract involving the construction of 30 trains (with 29 being built at a new facility in the state of Querétaro), also including the complete overhaul of line 1 with the aid of COMSA and Siemens which will provide the CBTC system, signalling equipment and new railroad tracks. Going to be inaugurated at the end of May 2024.

=== LRV ===
- Izmir Metro Line 1
- Klang Valley Integrated Transit System (Kuala Lumpur) Line 3, Line 4 and Line 11
- Johor Bahru–Singapore Rapid Transit System
- Huai'an tram, China
- Shenzhen tram, China
- Auto City tram T1 LRV in Wuhan – 21 cars with Siemens

=== Maglev ===
- Changsha Maglev
