= Shanghai Metro AC05 =

Rolling stock of Shanghai Metro Line 4

Shanghai Metro 04A01 AC05
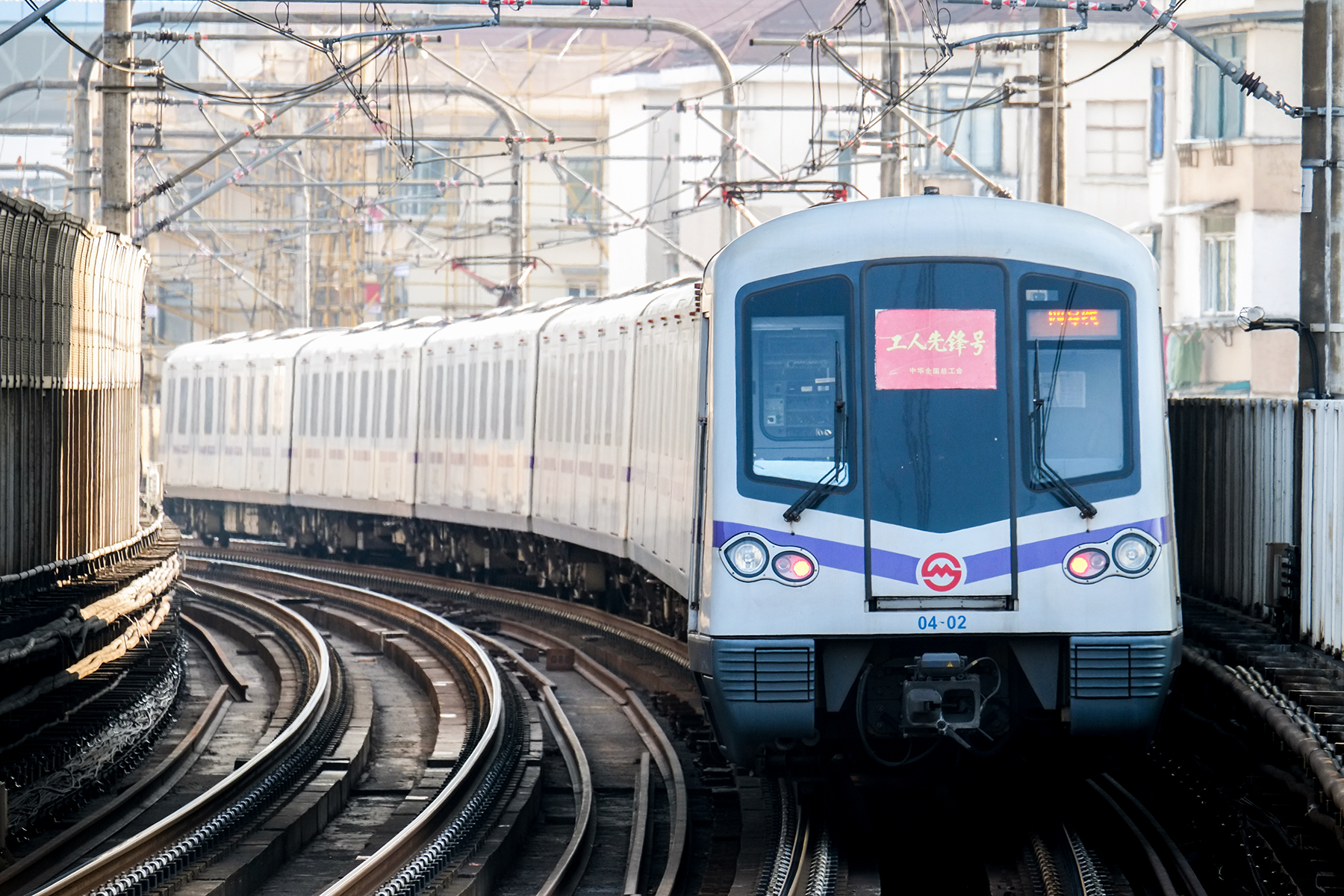
- 04A01 departing from West Yan'an Road station in 2024
- Stock type: Class A EMU
- In service: 31 December 2005-present
- Manufacturers: Siemens Mobility and CSR Zhuzhou Locomotive
- Built at: Vienna, Austria; Zhuzhou, China
- Family name: Modular Metro
- Constructed: 2004-2007
- Entered service: 31 December 2005
- Number built: 168
- Number in service: 168
- Formation: Tc-Mp-M+M-Mp-Tc
- Fleet numbers: 040011-041681
- Capacity: 310 per car
- Operator: Shentong Metro Group
- Depot: Puhuitang Depot
- Line served: 3 4

Specifications
- Car body construction: Aluminum alloy
- Train length: 139.98 m (459 ft 3 in)
- Car length: 23.54 m (77 ft 3 in)
- Width: 3 m (9 ft 10 in)
- Height: 3.8 m (12 ft 6 in)
- Doors: Electric doors
- Maximum speed: 80 km/h (50 mph)
- Traction system: Siemens Mobility G1500 D1100/400 M5-1 IGBT-VVVF
- Traction motors: Siemens Mobility 1TB2010-1GA02 3-phases AC induction motors
- Acceleration: Maximum 3.6 km/(h⋅s) (2.237 mph/s)
- Deceleration: 3.6 km/(h⋅s) (2.237 mph/s) (service); 4.7 km/(h⋅s) (2.920 mph/s) (emergency)
- Electric systems: 1,500 V DC
- Current collection: Single-arm Pantograph
- Bogies: Siemens Mobility SF2100
- Safety systems: Current: Alstom SACEM (enhanced fixed-block, ATO/GoA2); Future: CASCO Tranavi Qiji (TACS, DTO/GoA3)
- Track gauge: 4 ft 8 1/2 in (1,435 mm)

The 04A01 (formerly known as AC05) is an electric multiple unit currently used on Line 4 of Shanghai Metro. They are developed by Siemens Mobility and built by CSR Zhuzhou Locomotive. AC05 entered service on 31 December 2005.

Between July 2006 and September 2009, eight AC05 trains were temporarily assigned to Line 2 service, due to the shortage of AC02 trains, the delayed delivery of AC08 trains and the opening of Line 2 extension. In 2014, AC05 trains renamed 04A01 trains.

== Overview ==
The AC05 trains have livery in purple and white, with the number "4" on every car, to help passengers distinguish the AC03 trains at Line 3 section.

In March 2002, Siemens Mobility and CSR Zhuzhou Locomotive awarded the contract to build AC05 trains for the Pearl line Phase 2 project. The first train built by CSR Zhuzhou Locomotive was completed on 18 December 2004.

== Signaling upgrade ==
Between 2023 and 2025, all 04A01s were modified by Shentong Metro. They are undergoing TACS (DTO/GoA3) installation and every car's indicators increased from two to four. 04A01s' have also received new LCD screen displays. The LED display's color was changed from orange to red.

== See also ==
- Shanghai Metro AC01 and AC02 – 01A04 expansion cars used the same design.
