= Shanghai Metro AC16 =

Rolling stock of Shanghai Metro

Shanghai Metro 11A01 AC16
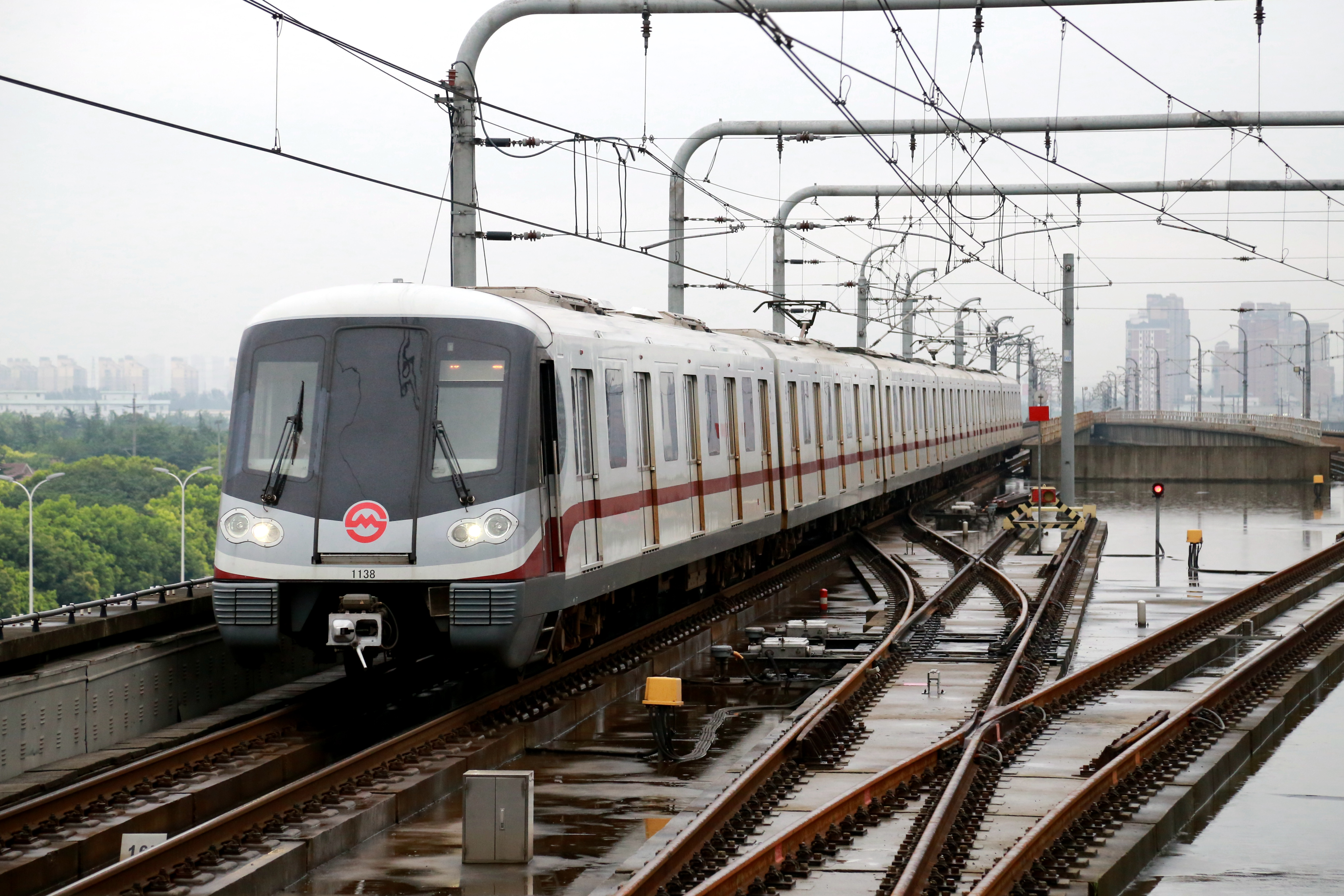
- Set 1138 approaching Nanxiang station on August 20, 2014
- Stock type: Class A EMU
- In service: 2009-present
- Manufacturer: CSR Zhuzhou Locomotive
- Built at: Zhuzhou, China
- Constructed: 2008-2013
- Entered service: 31 December 2009
- Number built: 396
- Number in service: 396
- Formation: Tc-Mp-M+M-Mp-Tc
- Fleet numbers: 110011-113961
- Capacity: 310 per car
- Operator: Shentong Metro Group
- Depots: Shanghai Circuit Depot; Chengbei Road Yard; Chuanyang River Yard
- Line served: 11

Specifications
- Car body construction: Aluminum alloy
- Train length: 139.98 m (459 ft 3 in)
- Car length: 23.54 m (77 ft 3 in)
- Width: 3 m (9 ft 10 in)
- Height: 3.8 m (12 ft 6 in)
- Doors: Electric doors
- Maximum speed: 100 km/h (62 mph)
- Traction system: Siemens Mobility G1500 D1100/400 M5-1 IGBT-VVVF
- Traction motors: Siemens Mobility 1TB2010-1GA02 3-phases AC induction motors
- Acceleration: Maximum 3.2 km/(h⋅s) (1.988 mph/s)
- Deceleration: 3.6 km/(h⋅s) (2.237 mph/s) (service); 4.7 km/(h⋅s) (2.920 mph/s) (emergency)
- Electric systems: 1,500 V DC
- Current collection: Single-arm Pantograph
- Bogies: CSR Zhuzhou Locomotive ZMA-100
- Safety systems: Thales SelTrac (CBTC, ATO/GoA2)
- Track gauge: 4 ft 8 1/2 in (1,435 mm)

The 11A01 (formerly known as AC16) is a model of rolling stock operated on Line 11 of Shanghai Metro. They are manufactured by CSR Zhuzhou Locomotives. A total of 396 cars (66 sets) were built.

In 2014, AC16 was renamed as 11A01.

== Overview ==
The livery of AC16 is inspired by "Formula One" and "Yulan magnolia", with white and brown. This design was also used by 11A02 and 11A03.

AC16's passenger information system only featured LED scrolling displays to show the next station and the terminal station.

=== Disney-themed livery ===
Since 16 June 2016, some of 11A01 trains added Disney liveries, featured Disney characters like Mickey Mouse, Minnie Mouse, Donald Duck and Goofy, and Enchanted Storybook Castle, the landmark of Shanghai Disneyland.

== Incident ==
On 11 November 2022, an out-of-service train (set 1120) experienced an overhead line short circuit and arcing while moving into the Jiading Xincheng station. It was stalled at just north of the station. The service between Shanghai Circuit station – Nanxiang station was suspended until 11 a.m..

== See also ==
- Shanghai Metro DC01 – 01A02 additional cars used the same design.
- Shanghai Metro 11A03 – Rolling stock model used for Phase III extension of Line 11. Followed 11A01's same design.
