= Shanghai Metro AC03 =

Rolling stock of Shanghai Metro Line 3

Shanghai Metro 03A01 AC03
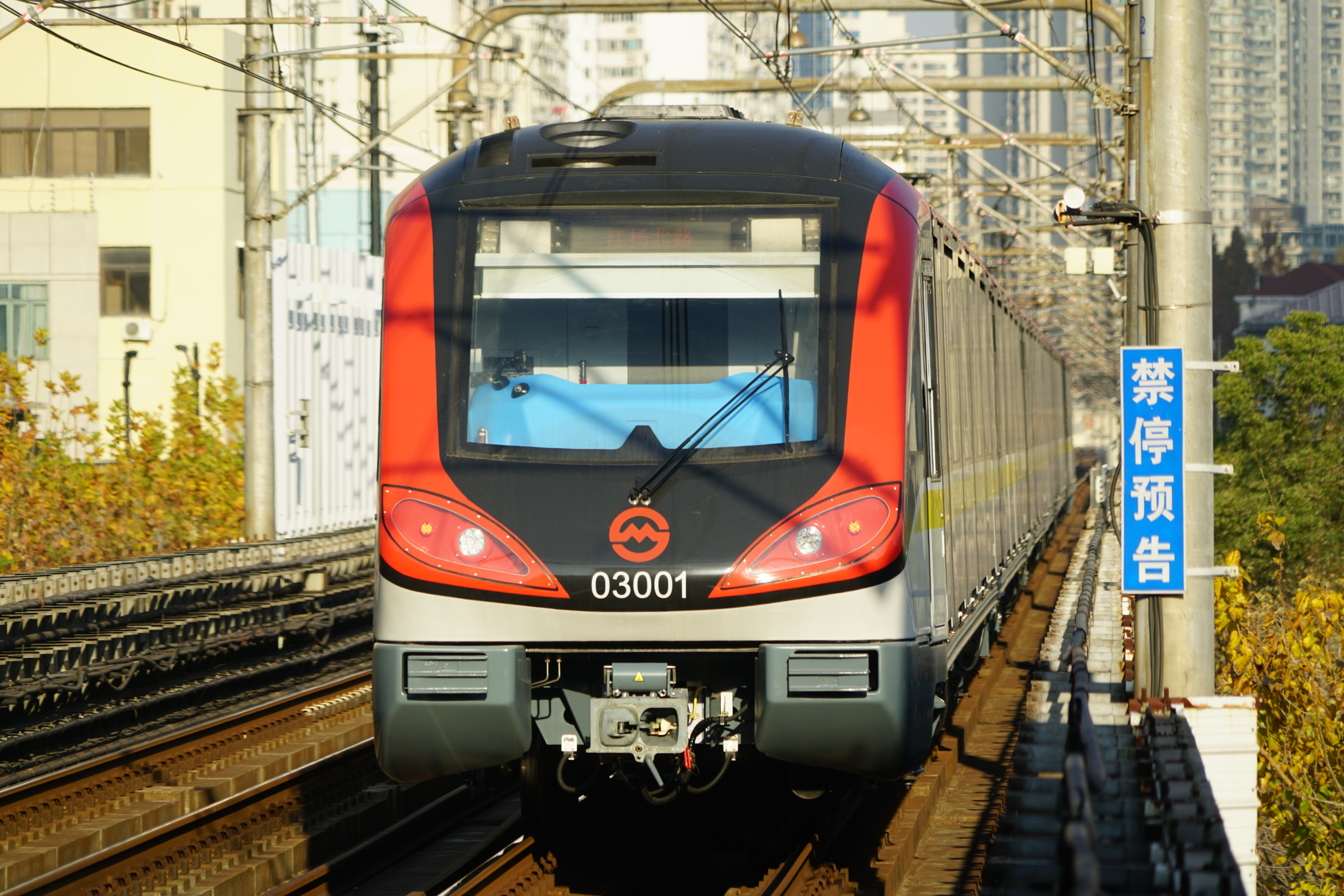
- A refurbished 03A01 set at Caoyang Road in December 2025
- Stock type: Class A EMU
- In service: 5 November 2002–present
- Manufacturers: Alstom and CSR Nanjing Puzhen
- Designer: MBD Design
- Built at: Valenciennes, France; Nanjing, China
- Family name: Metropolis
- Constructed: 2001–2004
- Entered service: 5 November 2002
- Refurbished: 2023 (proof-of-concept program), 2025
- Number built: 168
- Number in service: 60 (108 cars out of service)
- Formation: Tc-Mp-M+M-Mp-Tc
- Fleet numbers: 02011–02301, 03011–03961 and 04011–04421
- Capacity: 300 per car
- Operator: Shentong Metro Group
- Depots: North Jiangyang Road Depot; Shilong Road Yard
- Line served: 3

Specifications
- Car body construction: Aluminum alloy
- Train length: 139.98 m (459 ft 3 in)
- Car length: 23.54 m (77 ft 3 in)
- Width: 3 m (9 ft 10 in)
- Height: 3.8 m (12 ft 6 in)
- Doors: Electric doors
- Maximum speed: 80 km/h (50 mph)
- Traction system: Alstom ONIX 1500 IGBT-VVVF; Refurbished: Alstom OptONIX MG 1500 IGBT-VVVF (proof of concept program), Zhuzhou CRRC Times Electric tPower-TN28
- Traction motors: Alstom 4LCA-2138 3-phases AC induction motors
- Acceleration: Maximum 0.9 km/(h⋅s) (0.559 mph/s)
- Deceleration: 1 km/(h⋅s) (0.621 mph/s) (service); 1.3 km/(h⋅s) (0.808 mph/s) (emergency)
- Electric systems: 1,500 V DC
- Current collection: Single-arm Pantograph
- Bogies: Alstom B25
- Safety systems: Current: Alstom SACEM (enhanced fixed-block, ATO/GoA2); Future: CASCO Tranavi Qiji (TACS, DTO/GoA3)
- Track gauge: 4 ft 8 1/2 in (1,435 mm)

The 03A01 (formerly known as AC03) is a current rolling stock used on Line 3 of Shanghai Metro. They are developed by Alstom and built by CSR Nanjing Puzhen. The contract was awarded to Alstom on 11 May 1999. The first train delivered on 5 December 2001 and entered service on 5 November 2002.

In 2014, AC03 was renamed as 03A01.

== Features ==
AC03 trains have livery in red, black and white. Since the opening of Line 4, the number "3" and yellow color has been added to the livery on every car to help passengers distinguish the AC05 trains at Baoshan Road station - Hongqiao Road station section, which are assigned to Line 4 service.

== Refurbishment ==
The 03A01 is undergoing a major renovation by CRRC Nanjing Puzhen. The contract PM216 of refurbish program includes redesigning a different style livery of red, yellow and white on bodies and trains' front. All trains will also receive a new passenger information systems, including LCD screen displays. The signalling system will be upgraded from ATO to DTO (TACS). Traction systems will be changed from ONIX 1500 to OptONIX MG 1500 for the first phase of 6 cars (03371–03421). Lifespan will be extended from 35 years to at least 50 years.

The refurbished cars 03071–03121 were delivered back to North Jiangyang Road Depot on 18 April, 2025.
