= CRRC Group =

Chinese holding company

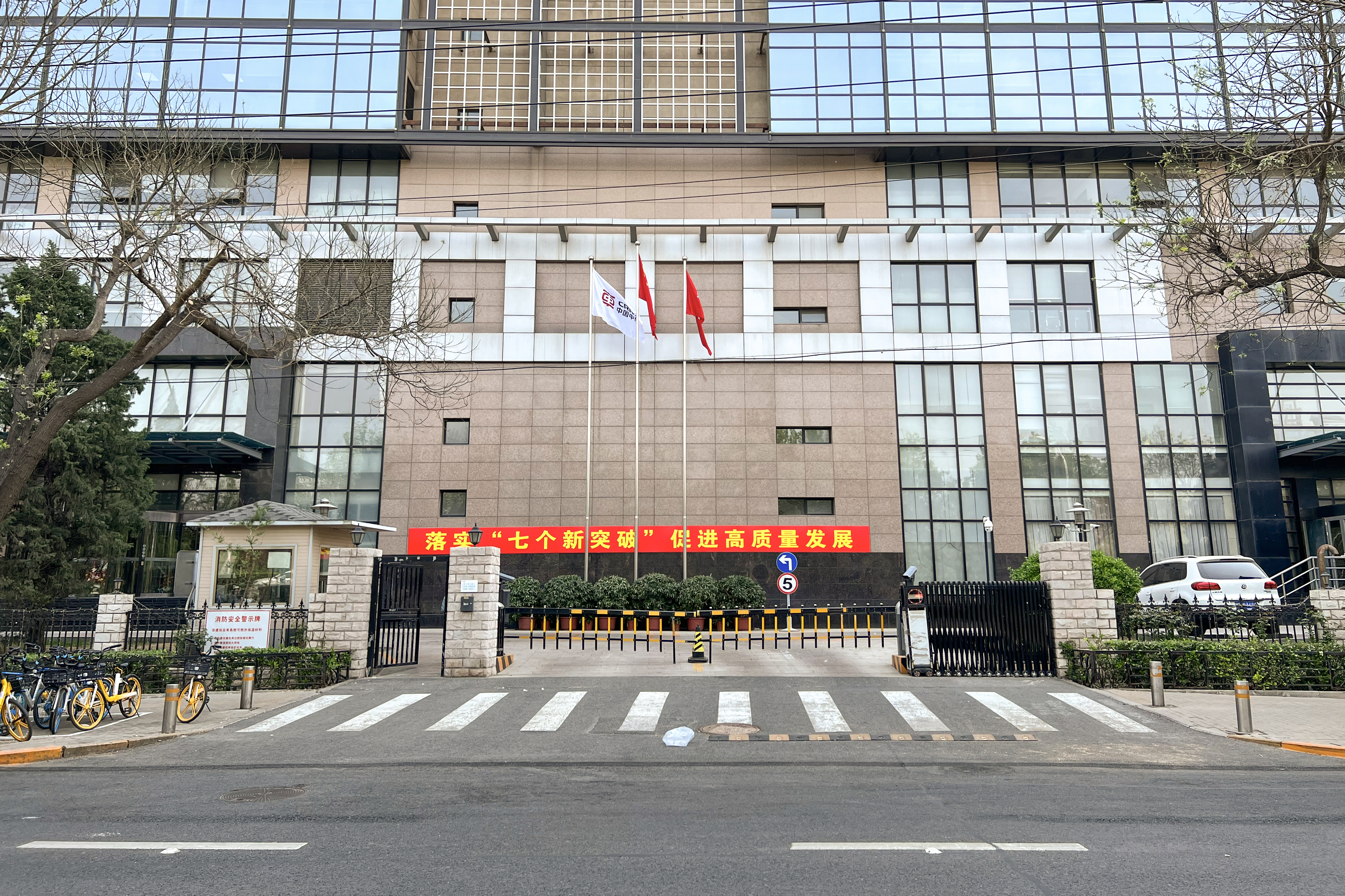
- Headquarters of CRRC Group in Fangzhuang
- Type: State-owned
- Industry: Manufacturing, real estate
- Predecessor: CNR; CSR
- Founded: 2015; 11 years ago
- Founder: SASAC
- Headquarters: Beijing, China
- Area served: Worldwide
- Key people: Liu Hualong (Chairman & Party Committee Secretary)
- Revenue: ▼CN¥233.1 billion (2016)
- Operating income: ▼CN¥14.4 billion (2016)
- Net income: CN¥5.7 billion (2016)
- Total assets: ▲CN¥358.9 billion (2016)
- Total equity: ▲CN¥63.3 billion (2016)
- Owner: Chinese Government
- Subsidiaries: CRRC (55.92%); South Huiton (42.64%); See full list

Chinese name
- Simplified Chinese: 中国中车集团有限公司
- Traditional Chinese: 中國中車集團有限公司
Transcriptions
Standard Mandarin
- Hanyu Pinyin: Zhōngguó zhōngchē jítuán gōngsī

Alternative Chinese name
- Simplified Chinese: 中车集团
- Traditional Chinese: 中車集團
Transcriptions
Standard Mandarin
- Hanyu Pinyin: zhōngchē jítuán
- Website: crrcgc.cc

CRRC Group Corporation, known as CRRC Group, is a Chinese state-owned holding company, direct parent company of CRRC and 32 other subsidiaries; if including second-tier subsidiaries, the holding company is the head of 112 legal entities (as in 2016).

== History ==
The predecessors of the holding company: CNR Group and CSR Group, were formed in 2002 by splitting China National Railway Locomotive & Rolling Stock Industry Corporation (LORIC), a corporation under the Ministry of Railways.

The control of CNR Group and CSR Group were also transferred from the Ministry of Railways to the State-owned Assets Supervision and Administration Commission of the State Council (SASAC) in the same year, became duopoly in locomotives and rolling stock manufacturing. In 2000s, CNR, CSR, Zhuzhou Times New Material Technology (2002) and Zhuzhou CSR Times Electric (2006) were spin-off from the groups as listed companies.

In 2015, as part of the reform of the whole railway industry, which saw the closure of the Ministry of Railways and spin-off the China Railway as operator and purchaser, the National Railway Administration as regulator, the two duopoly also merged back into one holding company under the SASAC, by CNR Group absorbing CSR Group, and renamed into CRRC Group; their two main listed subsidiaries were also merged to form CRRC (excluding CRRC Times Electric and Times Material Technology).

In 2017, CRRC Group was reincorporated from "Industrial Enterprises Owned by the Whole People" (全民所有制工业企业) to state-owned limited company (国有独资公司), renaming from 中国中车集团公司 to 中国中车集团有限公司.

== Business overview ==
The main activity of CRRC Group is holding company, as well as equity investments via CSR Investment Management, CRRC Group Capital Holdings and CRRC Industrial Investment. Most of the other subsidiaries were the original legal entities of the factories that under CNR and CSR Groups, which after the initial public offering of the two listed flagship subsidiaries, as sub-holding companies for auxiliary assets that were not listed. However, CRRC Group also contained a shipbuilding subsidiary CNR Ship & Ocean Engineering Development, which was an investment vehicle of CNR Group.

CRRC Group also engaged in real estate development in Taiyuan, on top of the old factory of CRRC Taiyuan. CRRC Group paid CN¥1.711 billion to bid back the land lease from the local government.

CRRC Industrial Investment were the parent company of South Huiton (42.64%) and Ziyang CRRC Electrical Technology for 51%. The shares of the latter were purchased from CRRC's CRRC Ziyang for about CN¥448 million.

== Subsidiaries ==
As of December 31, 2016

Only 33 direct subsidiaries were listed:

1. CRRC (55.92%)
2. CNR Group Qiqihar Railway Rolling Stock (Group) Co., Ltd. (100%, CRRC Qiqihar Railway Rolling Stock was spin-off and belongs to CRRC)
3. CRRC Group Wuhan Jiang'an Rolling Stock Works (100%, the factory was spin off and belongs to CRRC Yangtze Wuhan branch, a subsidiary of CRRC)
4. CNR Group Tianjin Locomotive & Rolling Stock Machinery Works (100%, CRRC Tianjin Equipment was spin-off and belongs to CRRC)
5. CRRC Group Tongling Rolling Stock Works (100%, the factory was spin off and belongs to CRRC Yangtze Tongling, a subsidiary of CRRC Yangtze)
6. CRRC Group Harbin Rolling Stock Co., Ltd. (100%, CRRC Harbin Rolling Stock was spin-off and belongs to CRRC)
7. CRRC Group Luoyang Locomotive Works (100%, CRRC Luoyang was spin-off and belongs to CRRC)
8. CRRC Group Meishan Rolling Stock Works (100%, CRRC Meishan was spin-off and belongs to CRRC)
9. CNR Group Jinan Locomotive & Rolling Stock Works (100%, CRRC Shandong was spin-off and belongs to CRRC)
10. CRRC Group Xiangyang Locomotive Works (100%, the factory was spin-off and belongs to CRRC Luoyang, Xiangyang branch)
11. CRRC Group Ziyang Locomotive Works (100%, CRRC Ziyang was spin-off and belongs to CRRC)
12. CRRC Group Wuhan Wuchang Rolling Stock Works (100%, the factory was spin off and belongs to CRRC Yangtze, Wuhan branch)
13. CNR Ship & Ocean Engineering Development Co., Ltd. (94%)
14. CRRC Dalian Dali Railway Transportation Equipment Co., Ltd. (100%) (Note: , "Dali" company (大力; Dà Lì) was found in 2007; not to be confused with "Daqi" Railway Transportation Equipment founded by CNR Group Qiqihar in 2007; both NOT related to CRRC Dalian, a CRRC direct subsidiary)
15. CNR Group Beijing February 7 Locomotive Works (100%, CRRC Beijing Locomotive was spin-off and belongs to CRRC)
16. CRRC Group Nanjing Puzhen Rolling Stock Works (100%, CRRC Nanjing Puzhen was spin-off and belongs to CRRC)
17. CRRC Group Qingdao Sifang Rolling Stock Asset Management (100%, CRRC Qingdao Sifang was spin-off and belongs to CRRC)
18. CRRC Group Taiyuan Locomotive & Rolling Stock Works (100%, CRRC Taiyuan was spin-off and belongs to CRRC)
19. CRRC Group Shenyang Locomotive & Rolling Stock Trading Corporation (100%, CRRC Shenyang was spin-off and belongs to CRRC)
20. CRRC Group Xi'an Rolling Stock Works (100%, CRRC Xi'an was spin-off and belongs to CRRC)
21. CRRC Group Zhuzhou Electric Locomotive Works (100%, CRRC Zhuzhou Locomotive was spin-off and belongs to CRRC)
22. CRRC Group Zhuzhou Rolling Stock Works (100%, the factory was spin off and belongs to CRRC Yangtze, Zhuzhou branch)
23. CRRC Group Beijing Nankou Locomotive & Rolling Stock Machinery Works (100%, CRRC Beijing Nankou was spin-off and belongs to CRRC)
24. Changzhou Institute of Railway Technology (100%)
25. CRRC Group Chengdu Locomotive & Rolling Stock Works (100%, CRRC Chengdu was spin-off and belongs to CRRC)
26. CRRC Group Shijiazhuang Rolling Stock Works (100%, CRRC Shijiazhuang was spin-off and belongs to CRRC)
27. CRRC Group Changzhou Qishuyan Locomotive & Rolling Stock Works (100%, CRRC Qishuyan was spin-off and belongs to CRRC)
28. CSR Group Investment Management Co., Ltd. (100%)
29. CRRC Group Capital Holdings Co., Ltd. (100%)
30. CRRC Industrial Investment Co., Ltd. (100%)
31. CRRC Real Estate (100%)
32. CNR Group Australia (100%)
33. 北京时代志业机车车辆有限公司 (100%, Beijing CSR Times Locomotive & Rolling Stock Machinery was spin-off and belongs to CRRC)

other notable second-tier subsidiaries (other than CRRC subsidiaries)

- South Huiton (SZSE: 000920, 42.64%)
- Ziyang CRRC Electrical Technology (51%)

unknown tier:

- CRRC Financial and Securities Investment (100%)

== Equity investments ==
As of January 13, 2017

- Zhuzhou Times New Material Technology (11.46%, excluding shares held by CRRC)
- China Structural Reform Fund
- China Unicom A share – via a private equity fund of Aegon–Industrial Fund Management (兴全基金) that subscribed by CRRC Financial and Securities Investment

former

- Zhuzhou CRRC Times Electric (0.80% excluding held by CRRC; sold to Sinomach Capital on January 13, 2017)
