= CRRC Zhuzhou =

CRRC Zhuzhou (formerly CSR Zhuzhou) may refer to:

- CRRC Zhuzhou Institute Co., Ltd., formerly Zhuzhou Electric Locomotive Research Institute, CSR Zhuzhou Electric Locomotive Research Institute Co., Ltd., subsidiary of listed company CRRC Corp. Ltd.
  - Zhuzhou CRRC Times Electric, Chinese listed company, indirect subsidiary of CRRC Corp. Ltd.
- CRRC Zhuzhou Locomotive, subsidiary of CRRC Corp. Ltd.

== See also ==
- Zhuzhou Times New Material Technology, a subsidiary of CRRC Zhuzhou Institute
