= Zhuzhou CRRC Times Electric =

Chinese Train Manufacturer

Zhuzhou CRRC Times Electric Co., Ltd.
- Native name: 株洲中车时代电气股份有限公司
- Formerly: Zhuzhou CSR Times Electric
- Type: public
- Traded as: SEHK: 3898 (H share); unlisted (A share)
- Industry: Railway equipment manufacturing
- Predecessor: Zhuzhou Times Electronic; Ningbo Times Transducer
- Founded: 1992 (predecessors); 26 September 2005; 21 years ago
- Founder: Zhuzhou Electric Locomotive Research Institute
- Headquarters: Zhuzhou, China
- Area served: China
- Key people: Ding Rongjun (chairman)
Owner
| CRRC | (51.81%) |
| Schroders | (5.13%) |
| Bank of America | (4.59%) |
| Fidelity International | (2.80%) |
| GIC Private Limited | (2.39%) |
| CRCCE | (0.83%) |
| Sinomach Capital | (0.80%) |
| general public | (31.65%) |
Parent
| Zhuzhou Institute | (direct) |
| CRRC | (intermediate) |
| CRRC Group | (intermediate) |
| the SASAC | (intermediate) |
| the State Council | (ultimate) |
- Subsidiaries: Zhuzhou Times Electronic; Ningbo Times Transducer
- Website: www.tec.crrczic.cc/

Zhuzhou CRRC Times Electric Co. Ltd.
- Simplified Chinese: 株洲中车时代电气股份有限公司
- Traditional Chinese: 株洲中車時代電氣股份有限公司
- Hanyu Pinyin: Zhūzhōu Zhōngchē Shídài Diànqì Gǔfèn yǒuxiàn gōngsī
Transcriptions
Standard Mandarin
- Hanyu Pinyin: Zhūzhōu Zhōngchē Shídài Diànqì Gǔfèn yǒuxiàn gōngsī

CRRC Times Electric
- Simplified Chinese: 中车时代电气
- Traditional Chinese: 中車時代電氣
- Hanyu Pinyin: Zhōngchē Shídài Diànqì
Transcriptions
Standard Mandarin
- Hanyu Pinyin: Zhōngchē Shídài Diànqì

Zhuzhou CRRC Times Electric Co. Ltd., abbreviated as TEC, is a Chinese train manufacturer. It is headquartered in Zhuzhou, Hunan Province. The company is a prominent maker of traction systems for locomotives, electric multiple units and urban transit train applications, which generates about 70% of the company's total sales.

Despite both CRRC Times Electric and intermediate parent company CRRC were listed companies, the ultimate largest shareholder was the Central Government of China, via SASAC and CRRC Group.

Since 5 September 2016 CRRC Times Electric is a constituent of Hang Seng China Enterprises Index.

== History ==
=== Predecessors ===
The parent company of the predecessors and current direct parent entity of Zhuzhou CRRC Times Electric, Zhuzhou Electric Locomotive Research Institute, was found in 1959 by the Ministry of Railways (now known as CRRC Zhuzhou Institute Co., Ltd., formerly CSR Zhuzhou Electric Locomotive Research Institute Co., Ltd., abb. CRRC ZELRI; subsidiary of listed company CRRC).

In 2002, Zhuzhou Electric Locomotive Research Institute was 51% owned by CSR Group and CNR Group, the duopoly of the Chinese market. The ratio was set immediately after the controls of the duopoly were transferred from the Ministry of Railways to State-owned Assets Supervision and Administration Commission (SASAC). Both SASAC and the ministry were entities of the State Council of the People's Republic of China.

The institute had founded Zhuzhou Times Electronic Technology Co., Ltd. (Chinese: 株洲时代电子技术有限公司, "Times Electronic" for short) on 28 December 1992, which became a subsidiary of Zhuzhou CSR Times Electric in 2005, for 90% share capital. Another subsidiary of the institute, "Zhuzhou Electric Locomotive Research Institute, Ningbo Branch", was found on 4 February 1992. The Ningbo Branch became a wholly owned subsidiary of Zhuzhou CSR Times Electric also in 2005.

=== Zhuzhou CRRC Times Electric ===
On 26 September 2005 Zhuzhou CSR Times Electric Co., Ltd. was incorporated as "company limited by shares" (Chinese: 股份有限公司; function similar to public limited company), CSR Group injected Times Electronic, CSR Zhuzhou Institute Ningbo Branch and other assets into the company as share capital. On 20 June 2006 the Ningbo company was re-incorporated as a limited company as Ningbo CSR Times Sensor Technology Co., Ltd. (Chinese: 宁波南车时代传感技术有限公司, now known as Ningbo CRRC Times Transducer Technology Co., Ltd., previously incorporated under the Law on Industrial Enterprises Owned by the Whole People in 1992)

In December 2006, Zhuzhou CSR Times Electric was listed on the Hong Kong Stock Exchange, a year before the listing of the intermediate parent company CSR Corp., Ltd.

Followed by the merger of ultimate parent company CSR Group with CNR Group to form CRRC Group (as well as their listed subsidiaries CSR Corp. Ltd. and China CNR Corp., Ltd. to form CRRC Corp., Ltd.) in 2015, Zhuzhou CSR Times Electric was renamed to Zhuzhou CRRC Times Electric on 10 March 2016. The company remained as a separate listed company without privatization nor merger by share swap.

== Joint venture ==
Siemens Traction Equipment Ltd. (STEZ), is a joint venture between Siemens (50%), Zhuzhou CRRC Times Electric (30%) and CRRC Zhuzhou Locomotive (20%). It produces AC drive electric locomotives and AC locomotive traction components.

== Shareholders ==
As of 13 January 2017

The share capital of the company consisted of domestic share (A share) and share floats outside mainland China (H share).

As of 13 January 2017, 53.44% shares were A shares, which were owned by subsidiaries of CRRC (mainly CRRC Zhuzhou Institute), subsidiary of Sinomach (Sinomach Capital Holdings Co., Ltd., Chinese: 国机资本控股有限公司) and CRCC High-tech Equipment, all were indirect subsidiaries of the Chinese Government (via SASAC). Moreover, CRRC Zhuzhou Institute also owned 2.91% shares of CRCC High-tech Equipment as minority shareholder.

As of 31 December 2016, the major shareholders of H shares (>5% H shares) were investment managers Schroders, Bank of America Merrill Lynch, Fidelity International and sovereign wealth fund of Singapore (GIC Private Limited).
