= CRRC Shandong =

Chinese rolling stock manufacturer

Coordinates: 36.655051°N 116.955037°E

CRRC Shandong Co. Ltd.
- Native name: 中车山东机车车辆有限公司
- Industry: Engineering
- Predecessor: Jinan Locomotive and Rolling Stock Plant
- Founded: 1910; 116 years ago as "Jinan Machine Factory"
- Headquarters: Jinan, Shandong, China
- Products: Rolling stock, metal structures
- Parent: CRRC
- Website: crrcgc.cc/sd

CRRC Shandong Co. Ltd. (Chinese: 中车山东机车车辆有限公司; lit. 'CRRC Shandong Locomotive & Rolling Stock Co.', 'Ltd.'), formerly also known as JRVEC (Jinan Railway Vehicles Equipment), is a railway rolling stock factory located in Jinan, Shandong, China, established in 1910 as a workshop of the Jinpu Railway.

CRRC Wind Power (formerly CNR Wind Power) is its wind power manufacturing subsidiary, established in 2010 in Songyuan.

== History ==
Jinan Locomotive and Rolling Stock Plant was founded in 1910 as the Jinan Machinary Works (济南机器厂) in Jinan, Shandong Province, China. The factory was established with German backing as a repair works for the northern parts of the Jinpu Railway; in 1914 it became the property of the 'Jinpu Railway Authority', under state control.

In 1951 the company was named Jinan Rolling Stock Repair Works (济南机车车辆修理工厂), and after 1958 Ministry of Railways Jinan Locomotive Works (铁道部济南机车工厂). The company operated mainly as a maintainer of steam locomotives, and also manufactured steam locomotives, including 117 YJ class and a small number of SY class.

In 1993 the company re-focused on manufacturing railway freight wagons, and was renamed Jinan Locomotive and Rolling Stock Works (济南机车车辆厂). At the beginning of the 21st century, it began to diversify into other areas, including steel structure manufacture.

In July 2007 the company name was changed to Jinan Railway Vehicles Equipment Co., Ltd. (JRVEC), a wholly owned subsidiary of the China North Locomotive and Rolling Stock Industry (Group) Corporation (CNR Group). After the IPO of China CNR, the subsidiary belongs to the listed arm of the group.

In August 2016, the company name was changed to CRRC Shandong, after CNR Group was merged with CSR Group as CRRC Group.

== Products ==
As of 2012 the company manufactured railway wagons, including tank, double-deck car transporting, open, flat, closed types, and wagon bogies. Other products included steel structures including communications towers, bridges, and wind turbine towers. The company also produced toilet systems and bolt tightening machines for specialised railway applications. The company had a production capacity of 7000 wagons per year.

== Subsidiaries ==
CNR Wind Turbine Co., Ltd was established in Jinan with a capital of 100 million Yuan to design and manufacture wind turbines. CNR foresees a total investment of 3 billion Yuan to establish a facility with production capacity of 1000 wind turbines per year. On 4 September 2009 construction of a factory with a 500 turbine per year capacity began in Songyuan, Jilin province. The plant was fully complete by May 2011.

The company's first installed product was a 1.5 MW turbine, used at the Shandong Dongying wind project from mid-2010. The first company's first 2 MW turbine was manufactured in 2012.
