= Zhuzhou Times New Material Technology =

Chinese plastic manufacturer

- Native name: 株洲时代新材料科技股份有限公司
- Type: Public
- Traded as: SSE: 600458
- Industry: manufacturing
- Founded: 1984; 42 years ago
- Founder: Zhuzhou Electric Locomotive Research Institute
- Headquarters: Zhuzhou, China
- Area served: China
- Key people: Li Donglin (chairman)
- Products: mica; plastic
Owner
CRRC	(39.56%)
CRRC Group (excluding CRRC)	(11.46%)
Central Huijin	(2.17%)
Social Security Fund	(0.72%)
general public	(46.09%)
Parent
Zhuzhou Institute	(direct)
CRRC	(intermediate)
CRRC Group	(intermediate)
the SASAC	(intermediate)
the State Council	(ultimate)
- Website: zz-tmt.com

Zhuzhou Times New Material Technology Co., Ltd.
- Simplified Chinese: 株洲时代新材料科技股份有限公司
- Traditional Chinese: 株洲時代新材料股份有限公司
Transcriptions
Standard Mandarin
- Hanyu Pinyin: Zhūzhōu shídài xīncáiliào gǔfèn yǒuxiàn gōngsī

Alternative Chinese name
- Simplified Chinese: 时代新材
- Traditional Chinese: 時代新材
- Literal meaning: Times New Material
Transcriptions
Standard Mandarin
- Hanyu Pinyin: shídài xīncái

Zhuzhou Times New Material Technology Co., Ltd. also known as TMT, is a Chinese plastic manufacturer based in Zhuzhou, Hunan Province. The company also produced mica.

== History ==
The predecessor of TMT was founded as a research division of Zhuzhou Electric Locomotive Research Institute (now CRRC Zhuzhou Institute Co., Ltd., formerly CSR Zhuzhou Electric Locomotive Research Institute Co., Ltd.) in 1984. It followed the direct parent company to become part of CSR Group in 2002 (spin-off from the Ministry of Railways' LORIC). On 19 December 2002 the company became a listed company.

In 2007 CSR Group span off CSR Corporation Limited as the new holding company for CSR Zhuzhou Electric Locomotive Research Institute, as well listing it in the stock exchange. In 2015, TMT became an indirect subsidiary of CRRC Group and its listed flagship CRRC.

== Shareholders ==
As of 4 January 2017, Zhuzhou Times New Material Technology was absolutely controlled (>50%) by the state-owned CRRC Group via its flagship company CRRC (Note: via CRRC Zhuzhou Institute (36.43%), CRRC Zhuzhou Locomotive (1.54%), CRRC Ziyang (0.89%) and CRRC Dalian.) and other unlisted subsidiaries. (Note: Namely, CSR Group Investment Management (8.22%), CRRC Group Zhuzhou Rolling Stock Works (1.11%), CRRC Group Nanjing Puzhen Rolling Stock Works (0.88%), CRRC Group Meishan Rolling Stock Works and CRRC Group Shijiazhuang Rolling Stock Works.) Two other subsidiaries of the State Council, Central Huijin Investment and the National Council for Social Security Fund (as investment manager for the Social Security Fund), owned minority stakes in TMT. In the top 10 direct shareholders, only two were not related to the state, as private equity funds of the Bank of China and the Agricultural Bank of China (1.08% shares and 0.78% shares respectively).

On 26 December 2016 – 3 January 2017, CRRC's non-wholly-owned subsidiary CRRC Qingdao Sifang, sold 1.29% shares of the listed company to the general public for about CN¥14 each.
