= Dynex Semiconductor =

United Kingdom semiconductor company

- Industry: Semiconductor industry
- Predecessor: AEI Semiconductor Ltd., GEC Plessey Semiconductor Ltd, Marconi Electronic Devices, Mitel
- Headquarters: Doddington Road, Lincoln, England, United Kingdom
- Key people: Jack Fu (CEO)
- Products: Integrated circuits Power semiconductors
- Parent: Zhuzhou CRRC Times Electric
- Website: dynexsemi.com

Dynex Semiconductor based in Lincoln, England, United Kingdom is a global supplier of products and services specialising in the field of power semiconductor devices and silicon on sapphire integrated circuit products. The power products they manufacture include IGBTs, various types of thyristor and GTOs.

== History ==
The Dynex power semiconductor business was originally established in Lincoln over 50 years ago when it was known as AEI Semiconductors Ltd. At that time, the business introduced some of the first silicon-based power semiconductor components in the world. Since then it acquired the power semiconductor interests, technologies and products from some major names such as GEC, SGS-Thomson, Alstom and Marconi Electronic Devices (MEDL).

=== Chinese takeover ===
In 2008, 75% of Dynex Power shares were acquired by Chinese manufacturer Zhuzhou CSR Times Electric Co., Ltd., a subsidiary of CSR Corporation Limited. A 2018 report in The Sunday Times asked if this acquisition led to China using British technology to build a railgun.

== Research partnerships ==
Along with several other industry partners, Dynex is a member of the National Microelectronics Institute of the University of Surrey.
