= CRRC =

Chinese rolling stock manufacturer

CRRC Corporation Ltd.

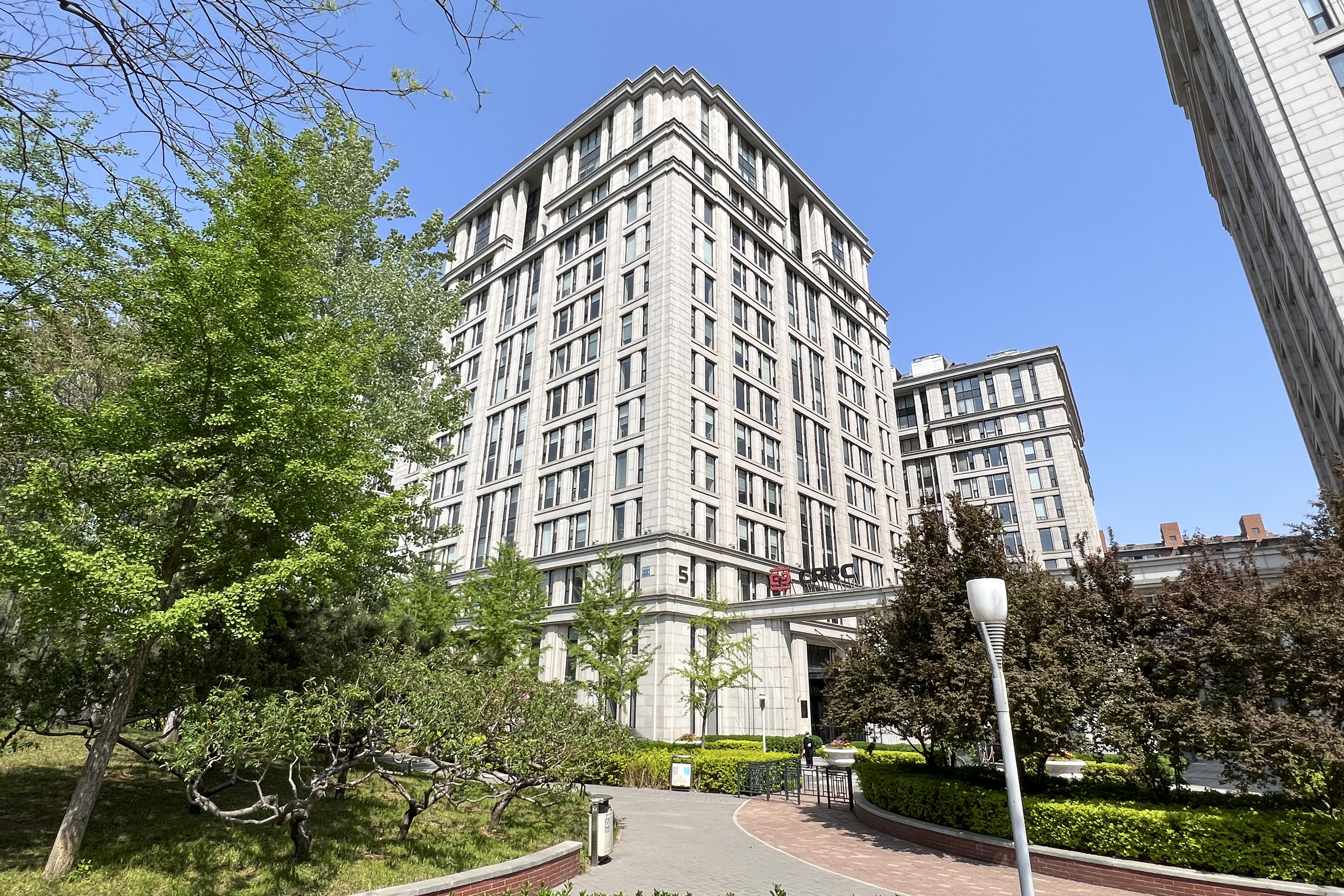
- CRRC headquarters in Haidian District, Beijing
- Native name: 中国中车股份有限公司
- Type: State-owned enterprise; public company
- Traded as: SSE: 601766 (A share); SEHK: 1766 (H share); CSI A50
- Industry: Rolling stock
- Predecessor: CNR; CSR
- Founded: 1 June 2015; 11 years ago
- Founder: CRRC Group
- Headquarters: Beijing, China
- Area served: Worldwide
- Key people: Liu Hualong (chairman of the board, party secretary); Xi Guohua (vice chairman, deputy party secretary, president); Sun Yongcai (executive director, vice president); Xu Zongxiang (executive director); Wan Jun (chairman of the supervisory board, deputy party secretary)
- Revenue: ▲CN¥214.521 billion (2018)
- Operating income: CN¥46.062 billion (2018)
- Net income: ▲CN¥12.998 billion (2018)
- Total assets: ▼CN¥357,523 billion (2018)
- Total equity: ▲CN¥149.684 billion (2018)
- Owner: CRRC Group (55.91%); China Securities Finance (2.87%); Central Huijin Investment (1.12%)
- Number of employees: 183,061 (2016)
- Parent: CRRC Group

Chinese name
- Simplified Chinese: 中国中车股份有限公司
- Traditional Chinese: 中國中車股份有限公司
Transcriptions
Standard Mandarin
- Hanyu Pinyin: Zhōngguó Zhōngchē Gǔfèn Yǒuxiàn Gōngsī

CRRC
- Simplified Chinese: 中国中车
- Traditional Chinese: 中國中車
Transcriptions
Standard Mandarin
- Hanyu Pinyin: Zhōngguó Zhōngchē
- Website: crrcgc.cc
- Footnotes in consolidated financial statement, in IFRS

CRRC Corporation Limited (known as CRRC, China Railway Rolling Stock Corporation) is a Chinese state-owned and publicly traded rolling stock manufacturer. It is the world's largest rolling stock manufacturer in terms of revenue, eclipsing its major competitors Alstom and Siemens.

It was formed on 1 June 2015 through the merger of CNR and CSR. As of 2016 it had 183,061 employees. The parent company is CRRC Group, a state-owned enterprise supervised by the State-owned Assets Supervision and Administration Commission of the State Council. The State Council also owned additional shares via China Securities Finance and Central Huijin Investment.

== History ==
=== Merger ===
CNR Group and CSR Group, were once one company, China National Railway Locomotive & Rolling Stock Industry Corporation (LORIC). The company was split up in 2002.

In late 2014, CNR Group and CSR Group agreed to merge, subject to approval by the Chinese state. Under the agreement, CNR Group would formally acquire CSR Group (but CSR Corporation Limited would acquire China CNR Corporation Limited). The combined business would each be renamed CRRC Group and CRRC Corporation Limited respectively (CRRC stands for China Railway Rolling Stock Corporation). The rationale given for the merger was increased efficiency, and the ability to better compete internationally.

The merger came into effect 1 June 2015, with each CNR share exchanged for 1.1 CSR shares – the combined company became the largest railway rolling stock manufacturer in the world, and held over 90% of the Chinese market. Total employment of the combine was 175,700 persons, and the share capital was valued at CN¥27.289 billion.

=== Overseas expansion ===
After the re-merger, CRRC started expanding overseas; after being awarded a 284 vehicle order (later expanded to 404 vehicles) for metro cars for Massachusetts Bay Transportation Authority's Red and Orange lines with a US$556.6 million bid in October 2014, the company started constructing a 13,900 square metres (150,000 sq ft) assembly plant in Springfield, Massachusetts, at a former Westinghouse plant beginning in September 2015. Manufacturing work began in April 2018.

In mid-2015, production began at a rolling stock plant in Batu Gajah, Perak, Malaysia, a satellite of CRRC Zhuzhou Locomotive, and the corporation's first plant outside China. Additionally the former CSR had acquired Emprendimientos Ferroviarios in Argentina in 2014 and announced in 2016 that it would begin maintenance and production of new rolling stock for export in the country. Argentina had previously purchased a variety of rolling stock from the company over the years, including 704 EMU cars, 81 DMU cars, 44 passenger locomotives, 360 carriages, 107 freight locomotives and 3,500 freight cars, in addition to the 150 200 Series cars for the Subte. In 2017, the Argentine government purchased an additional 200 EMUs from CRRC.

In mid-2015, CRRC formed a freight wagon joint venture, Vertex Railcar, as a minority partner with Hong Kong-based private equity firm Majestic Legend Holdings to establish production in Wilmington, North Carolina at a former Terex facility. CRRC provided railcar designs and some components, and Majestic Legend invested US$6 million; the plant was operational by the beginning of 2016. In August 2016, at the request of a letter from 55 US House of Representatives members alleging that Vertex was being unfairly subsidized by the Chinese government, the United States Department of the Treasury began an investigation into whether the Chinese investment in Vertex constituted a national security risk. 42 US Senators sent a similar letter in September, conveying concerns about the state-owned enterprises behind Vertex. The Treasury Department released its report in December and found that the joint ownership was not a risk.

In late 2015, Yu Weiping, one of the vice president of the company, stated the company planned to double overseas sales over five years, with North American passenger rail being one target. Interim six month financial results for the new company showed an increase in overseas revenue of over 60%. Half year revenue was CN¥91.8 billion, with a gross profit of CN¥19.5 billion. Non-rail revenue (car equipment, generators) was CN¥20.94 billion.

In March 2016, CRRC Qingdao Sifang was awarded a contract to build 400 7000-series cars for the Chicago Transit Authority (CTA), with an option for another 446 cars. The cost of the contract was US$632 million up to US$1.3 billion with options; as a consequence CRRC began development of a US$40 million assembly factory in Chicago, designed by Itasca, Illinois-based Cornerstone Architects Ltd.

In March 2017, the subsidiary CRRC Massachusetts (based in Quincy, Massachusetts) was awarded a contract by SEPTA to construct 45 bi-level rail cars with the option for 10 additional cars for delivery in October 2019. The SEPTA order was to be built at the Springfield plant and car shell manufactured from the Tangshan plant. CRRC was selected over Hyundai Rotem and Bombardier, which also bid on the bi-level contract and had each produced equipment for SEPTA in the past.

Later in March 2017, CRRC was awarded a contract to build 64 HR4000 cars for the Los Angeles County Metropolitan Transportation Authority (LACMTA) that will replace existing vehicles on the agency's Red and Purple lines, with an option for another 218 cars. The LACMTA order will result in a 41,218 square feet (3,829.3 m^{2}) assembly plant (installing propulsion, HVAC and other general assembly) being built in LA.

In 2019, the locomotive manufacturing business of Vossloh was purchased.

Delivery of the MBTA Red and Orange Line cars was severely delayed, and problems with electrical shorts, loose brake bolts, and derailments led to several removals of the new trains from service. The company blamed supply chain issues caused by the COVID-19 pandemic, but an MBTA official told CRRC MA management it "has completely abandoned its core responsibilities and commitment to lead, monitor and support quality management", and cited 16 specific failure areas. Workers at the site reported problems with quality tracking, trains being advanced through the assembly process despite missing parts, assembly occurring in the wrong order, and being left with nothing to do for months at a time because a disorderly invoice system failed to reliably pay suppliers for parts.

In 2023, CRRC received the equivalent of US$214 million in state subsidies. In April 2024, SEPTA terminated their order of bi-level rail cars, citing delays and poor build quality. They have stated "The authority is assessing its options for recouping funds that have been spent on the project" after spending $50 million on the project. CRRC expressed their disappointment at the cancellation, stating "[they] remain committed to completing the project."

In 2025 until March 2026, it took over the Hyundai-Rotem factory in Araraquara, far away from S. Paulo center and Train tracks for R$50 million.

=== South African bribery allegations ===
In June 2016 a predecessor company of CRRC, CSR Corporation Limited, was implicated in allegations of bribery to obtain a 2012 US$6 billion tender to deliver 600 locomotives to the state owned Passenger Rail Agency of South Africa (PRASA). It was reported that the future South African Public Protector Busisiwe Mkhwebane was implicated in the deal when she worked as Counselor Immigration and Civic Services in South Africa's embassy in China. By 2020 it was reported that funds allocated to pay for an adjusted contract to deliver the locomotives produced by CSR Corporation, now reformed into CRRC, had been frozen by the South African Revenue Service due to possible instances of corruption paid to associates of the Gupta family.

=== US sanctions ===
The United States Department of Defense alleges CRRC is a supplier to People's Liberation Army. In November 2020, Donald Trump issued an executive order prohibiting any American company or individual from owning shares in companies that the United States Department of Defense has listed as having links to the People's Liberation Army, which included CRRC.

In October 2022, the United States Department of Defense added CRRC to a list of "Chinese military companies" operating in the U.S.

=== EU investigation ===
In February 2024, the European Union launched an investigation into CRRC for allegedly using state subsidies to undercut European suppliers.

== Shareholders ==
As of 31 December 2016, CRRC was majority owned by CRRC Group directly and indirectly (via CRRC Financial and Securities Investment, 中车金证投资, for 1.64%) for 55.91% of total share capital (all in A share). Other state-owned entities of the central government, such as China Securities Finance (2.87%) and Central Huijin Investment (1.12%), also owned a minority stake. In terms of different shares, BlackRock owned 6.13% H shares in long position (267,971,072 number of shares), or 0.98% in terms of total share capital. Himalaya Capital, a Seattle based mutual fund also owned about 6.13% H shares in long position (267,904,000 number of shares). Other shareholders each owned less than 1% shares in terms of total share capital.

== CRRC US units ==
CRRC has two operating units:

- CRRC Massachusetts – operations for markets in Boston and Los Angeles
- CRRC Sifang America – focus market for Chicago

CRRC Sifang America
- Type: Subsidiary
- Industry: Rolling Stock
- Founded: 2019; 7 years ago
- Headquarters: Chicago, Illinois
- Area served: Worldwide
- Products: CTA 7000-series
- Revenue: US$$21.4 million (20??)
- Operating income: 46,062,360,000 renminbi (2018)
- Net income: 12,998,507,000 renminbi (2018)
- Total assets: 357,523,050,000 renminbi (2018)
- Number of employees: 200
- Parent: CRRC
- Website: www.crrcsifangamerica.com

== Subsidiaries ==
=== Locomotive ===
- CRRC Beijing Locomotive
- CRRC Datong Electric Locomotive
- CRRC Qishuyan Locomotive
- CRRC Luoyang Locomotive
- CRRC Xiangfan Locomotive
- CRRC Zhuzhou [Electric] Locomotive
- CRRC Ziyang Locomotive

=== Rolling Stock ===
- CRRC February 7 Rolling Stock
- CRRC Qiqihar Railway Rolling Stock
  - CRRC Harbin Rolling Stock
  - Chinese: 大连中车大齐车辆; lit. 'Dalian CRRC Daqi Railway Rolling Stock'
- CRRC Meishan Rolling Stock
- CRRC Nanjing Puzhen Rolling Stock
- CRRC Shijiazhuang Rolling Stock
- CRRC Taiyuan Railway Rolling Stock
- CRRC Yangtze Rolling Stock
  - CRRC Xi'an Railway Rolling Stock

=== Locomotive & Rolling Stock ===
- CRRC Chengdu
- CRRC Dalian
- CRRC Qingdao Sifang
- CRRC Tangshan

=== Other ===
- CRRC Beijing Nankou Railway Transportation Machinery
- CRRC Changchun Railway Vehicles
- CRRC Dalian Locomotive Research Institute
- CRRC Jinan Railway Vehicles Equipment
- CRRC Guangdong Railway Vehicles Equipment
- CRRC Qingdao Sifang Rolling Stock Research Institute
- CRRC Lanzhou Locomotive
- CRRC Shijiazhuang Guoxiang Transportation Equipment
- CRRC Tangshan Railway Transportation Equipment
- CRRC Tianjin Railway Transport Equipment
- CRRC Yongji Xinshisu Electric Equipment
- CRRC Zhuzhou Electric
- CRRC Zhuzhou Institute (former Zhuzhou Electric Locomotive Research Institute) (100%)
- Zhuzhou CRRC Times Electric (51.81%)

=== Joint venture ===
- Bombardier Sifang Transportation

=== Overseas ===
- CRRC Massachusetts
- CRRC Sifang America
- Dynex Semiconductor (United Kingdom) (Note: Subsidiary of Zhuzhou CRRC Times Electric)
- Emprendimientos Ferroviarios (Argentina)
- CRRC Rolling Stock Center (Malaysia) Sdn Bhd
- CRRC Kuala Lumpur Maintenance Sdn. Bhd. (Malaysia)
- Vossloh Locomotives (Germany)

== Other investments ==
On 8 January 2016 CRRC Corporation purchased 13.06% stake of China United Insurance Holding (Chinese: 中华保险) from China Insurance Security Fund for CN¥4.455 billion. It also joint-owned Zhuzhou Times New Material Technology with parent company CRRC Group.

In November 2016 the company (via CRRC Zhuzhou Locomotive) confirmed plans to buy Škoda Transportation based in the Czech Republic. The deal eventually did not go through.

On 1 March 2024, CRRC 40% with Grupo Comporte 60% entered at Trens Intercidades Proposal with the possibility to deliver 22 inter-city trains, to be used from Luz Station to Campinas since supposedly 2030.

== See also ==
- High-speed rail in China
