= Vertex Railcar =

Rolling stock manufacturer

Vertex Railcar was a jointly owned Chinese-American manufacturer of railroad rolling stock. It was founded in 2014 and operated a facility in Wilmington, North Carolina that builds freight railcars. The manufacturer closed operations at end of 2018.

The company was founded as Vertex Rail Technologies, based in Massachusetts, in 2014, and publicly announced in November its plans to purchase a former Terex manufacturing facility in Wilmington and convert it to railcar construction. The cost of renovating the factory was estimated at $60 million, and Vertex said that it would employ 1,300 people at full-scale production. In April 2015, Vertex Rail Technologies entered into a joint venture with Chinese manufacturer CRRC Corporation and Hong Kong–based private equity firm Majestic Legend Holdings, under which the manufacturing operation was named Vertex Railcar, CRRC provided railcar designs and some components, and Majestic Legend invested $6 million. Once Vertex received regulatory approval for and began manufacturing railcars, CRRC would be able to increase its stake to 50% by buying out the other stakeholders.

Vertex received Association of American Railroads certification of its first railcar design, DOT-117 tank cars, in August 2015, followed by certification for its covered hopper design later in the year. It began building hopper cars, constructed of US and Chinese origin components, in September, and delivered the first of them in December. The company had orders for 3,100 hopper cars at the beginning of 2016, and planned to build up to 3,000 cars, including hopper, tank, and gondolas, during the year. In February 2016, Vertex launched a subsidiary to lease railcars to customers who preferred not to own them. However, weakening demand for sand used in hydraulic fracturing in petroleum extraction led Vertex to decrease construction of its hoppers cars, which were designed to transport the sand, and lay off workers at the Wilmington plant in May, leaving the company with 221 employees.

In August 2016, at the request of a letter from 55 US House of Representatives members alleging that Vertex was being unfairly subsidized by the Chinese government by way of state-owned CRRC, the United States Department of the Treasury began an investigation into whether the Chinese investment in Vertex constituted a national security risk. 42 US Senators sent a similar letter in September, conveying concerns about the state-owned enterprises behind Vertex. The Treasury Department released its report in December and found that the joint ownership was not a risk.

The company announced closure of plant and layoffs of remaining employees by end of 2018.
