= CRRC Luoyang =

CRRC Luoyang Co., Ltd.
- Native name: 中车洛阳机车有限公司
- Type: Subsidiary
- Industry: Engineering
- Predecessor: Luoyang Locomotive Plant
- Founded: 1958; 68 years ago as "Luoyang Locomotive Plant"
- Headquarters: Luoyang, Henan, China
- Products: Locomotive, Metal structures
- Parent: CRRC
- Website: crrcgc.cc/ly

CRRC Luoyang Co., Ltd.
- Simplified Chinese: 中车洛阳机车有限公司
- Traditional Chinese: 中車洛陽機車有限公司
- Literal meaning: CRRC Luoyang Locomotive Co., Ltd.
Transcriptions

Alternative Chinese name
- Simplified Chinese: 中车洛阳
- Traditional Chinese: 中車洛陽
Transcriptions

CRRC Luoyang Co., Ltd. (Chinese: 中车洛阳机车有限公司; lit. 'CRRC Luoyang Locomotive Co.', 'Ltd.') is a railway locomotive manufacturing company, a subsidiary of CRRC, which is located in Luoyang, Henan in China, established in 1958, as Luoyang Locomotive Plant of Zhengzhou Railway Bureau. In 2007 the company was affiliated in CSR, and renamed CSR Luoyang Locomotive Co., Ltd. In 2015, as of the merger of CSR and CNR, CRRC was established, the subsidiary was renamed this name.
