= Rolling stock =

Railway vehicles, powered and unpowered

The term rolling stock in the rail transport industry refers to railway vehicles, including both powered and unpowered vehicles: for example, locomotives, freight and passenger cars (or coaches), and non-revenue cars. Passenger vehicles can be unpowered, or self-propelled, single or multiple units.

In North America, Australia and other countries, the term consist (/ˈkɒnsɪst/ KON-sist) is used to refer to the rolling stock that a train comprises, a list containing specific information for each car of a train, or a group of locomotives.

In the United States, the term rolling stock has been expanded from the older broadly defined "trains" to include wheeled vehicles used by businesses on roadways.

The word stock in the term is used in the sense of inventory. Rolling stock is considered a liquid asset, or close to it, since the value of the vehicle can be readily estimated and shipped to the buyer with minimal cost or delay. The term contrasts with fixed stock (infrastructure), which is a collective term for the track, signals, stations, other buildings, electric wires, etc., necessary to operate a railway.

== Manufacturers ==
A large number of companies and government agencies in many countries, past and present, have built rolling stock. Some of the most notable manufacturers are:

- Alstom (which acquired Bombardier in 2021)
- CAF
- CRRC (formerly CNR and CSR)
- Hitachi Rail (formerly AnsaldoBreda)
- Hyundai Rotem
- J-TREC (formerly Tokyu Car Corporation)
- Kawasaki
- Kinki Sharyo
- Nippon Sharyo
- Siemens
- Stadler Rail

== Gallery ==
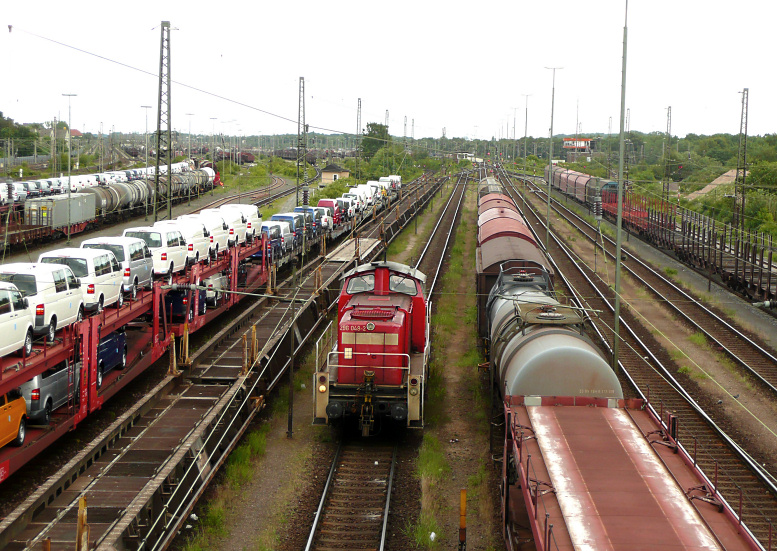
Variety of rolling stock in rail yard in Germany

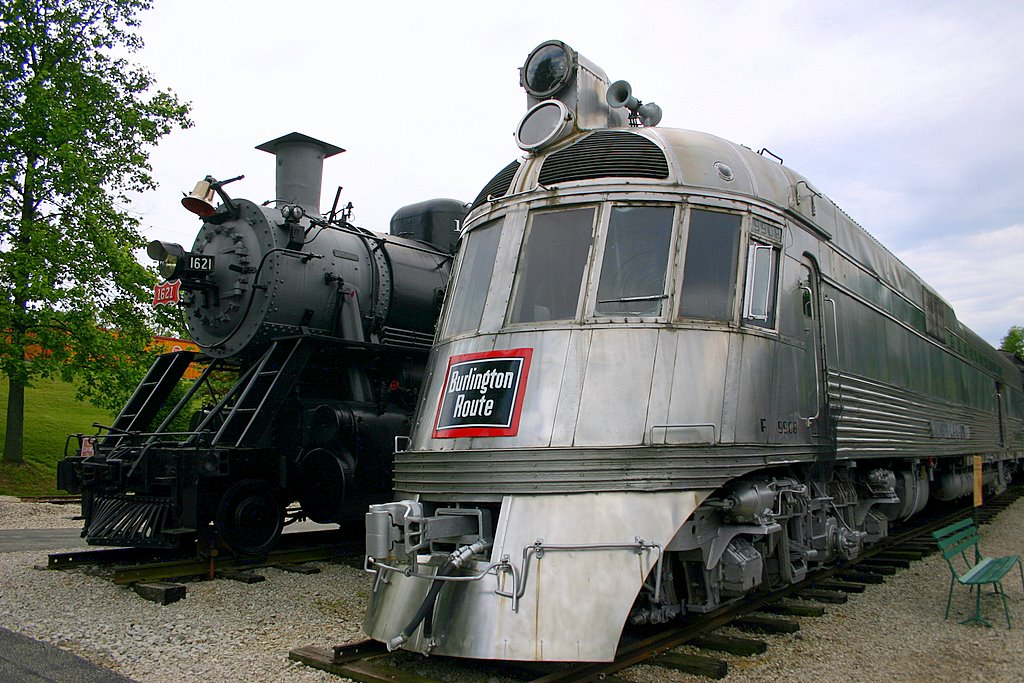
American Steam and diesel locomotives

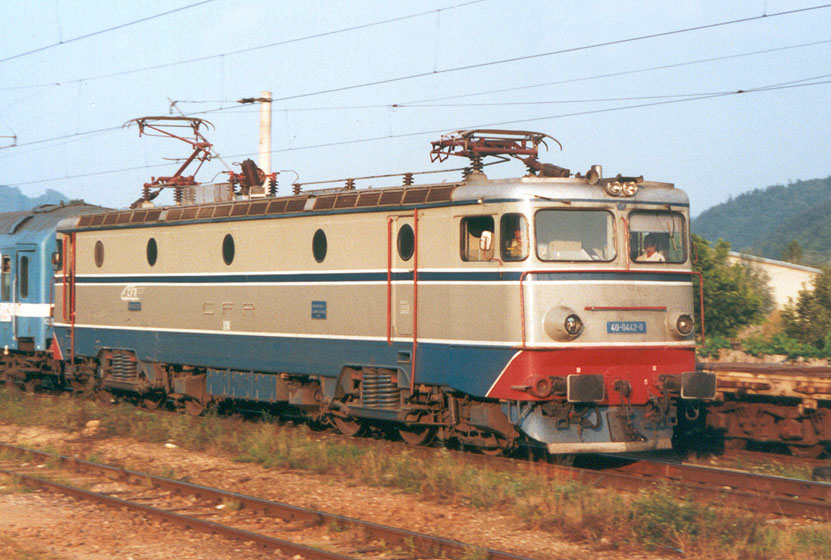
Electric locomotive in Romania

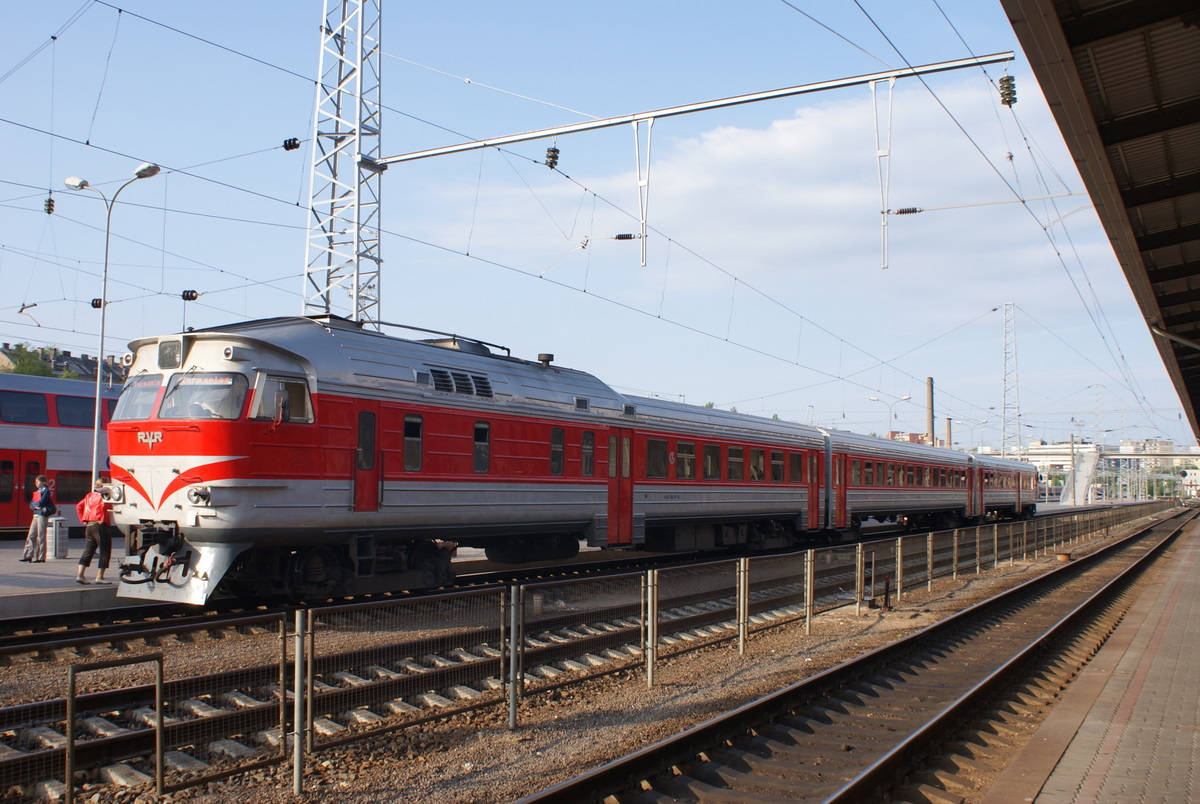
Diesel multiple unit (DMU)

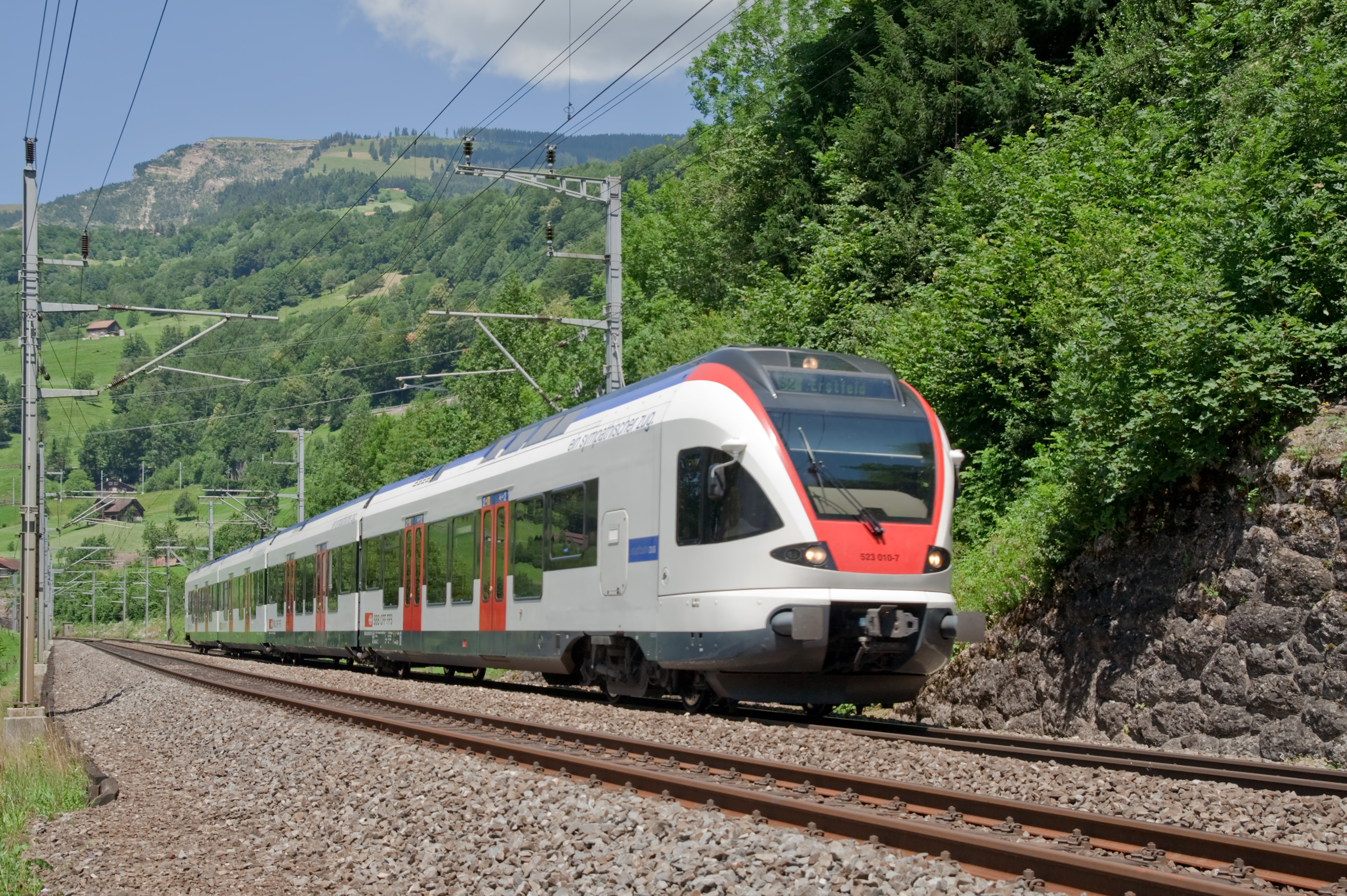
SBB Electric multiple unit (EMU)

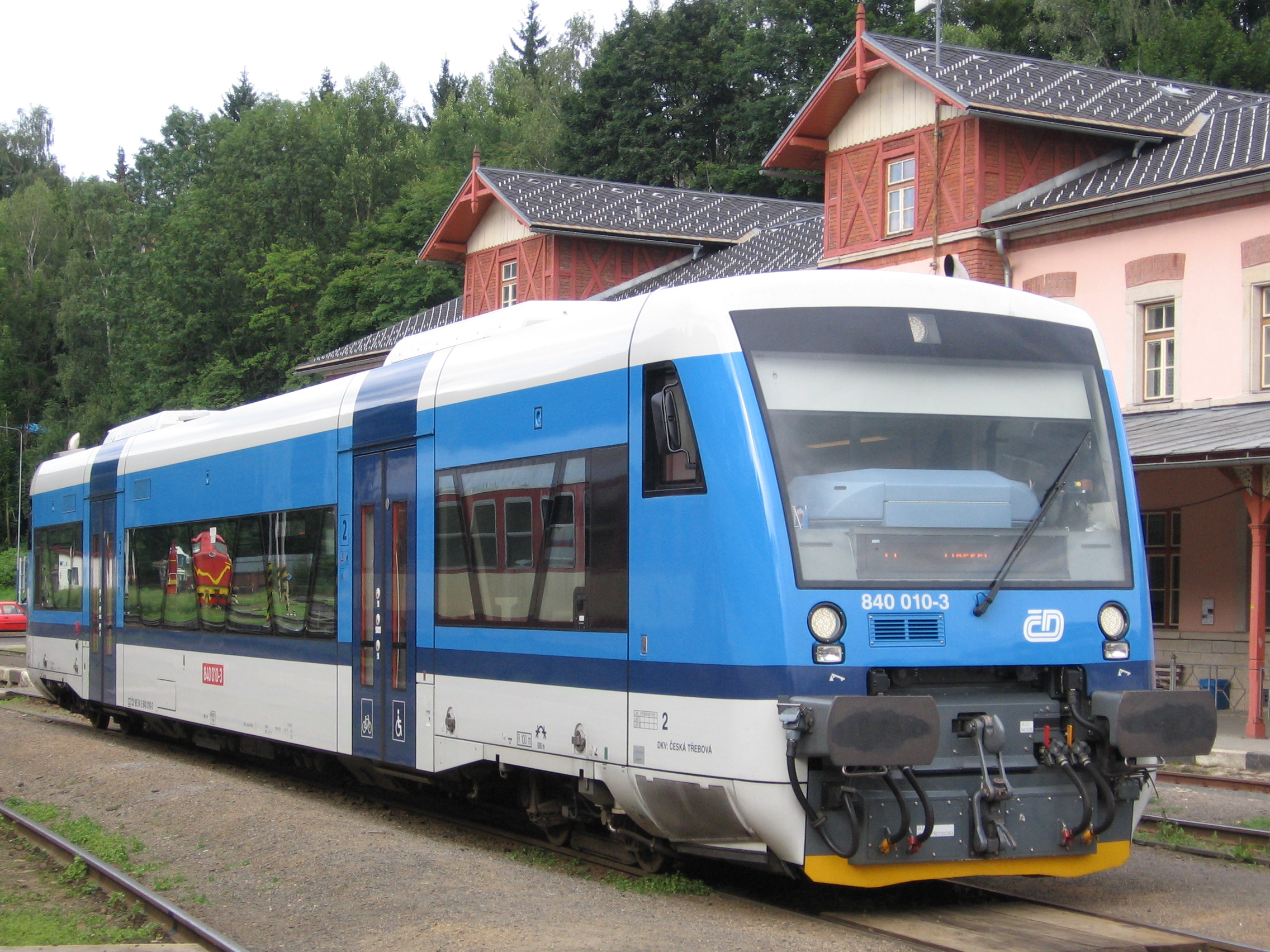
Articulated diesel railcar

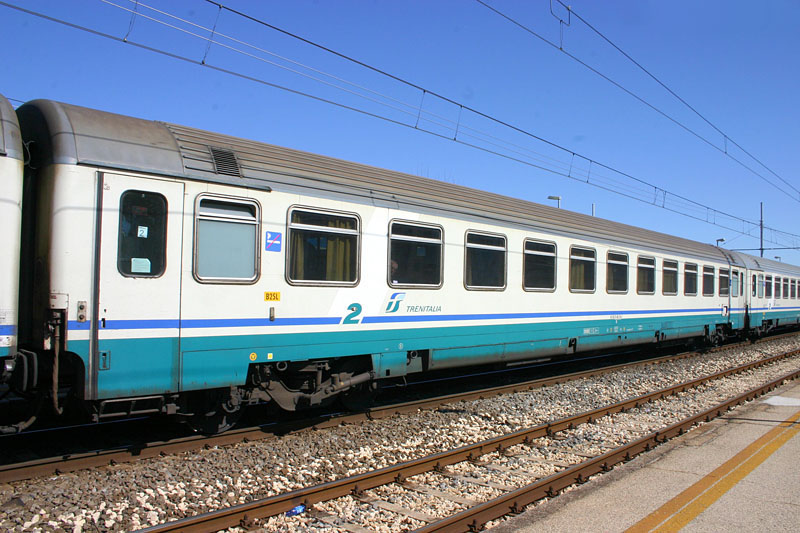
Passenger cars, also called carriages or coaches

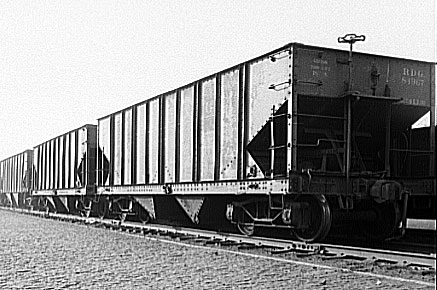
Hopper car, one of many types of revenue freight cars

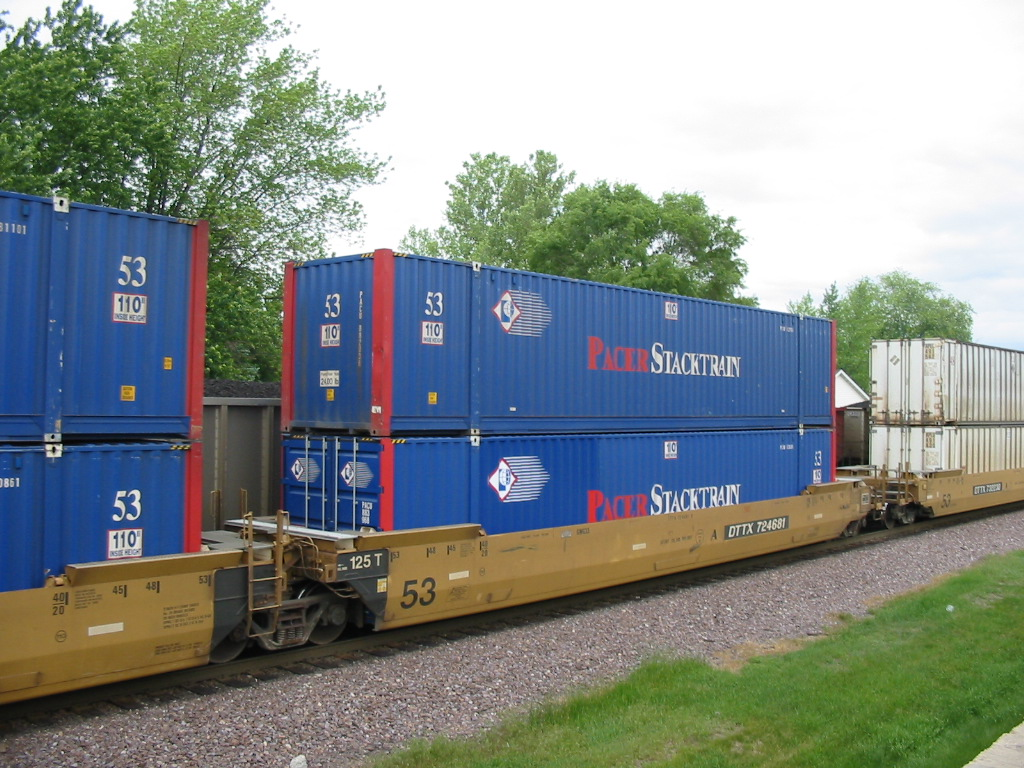
Articulated well cars with intermodal containers

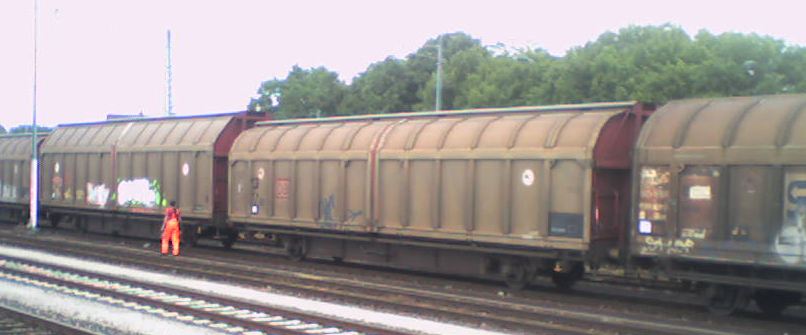
European covered goods wagons

== See also ==
- Goods wagon
- List of rolling stock manufacturers
- List of railway vehicles
- Railroad car
