= CKD7C =

The CKD7C is a Co-Co diesel locomotive manufactured by the CNR Dalian.

== Overview ==
On 3 November 2008, four diesel-electric locomotives were shipped to the DRC from China's Dalian port. They are 1,800 hp CKD7C models, manufactured by the China Northern Rail Corporation Limited (CNR). The company also offers a 1,000 hp model for the 1,067 mm gauge – the CKD5.

== Specifications ==
Technical specifications follow:

- Track gauge: 1,067 mm (3 ft 6 in)
- Transmission: AC/DC
- Wheel arrangement Co-Co
- Axle load: 15.0t
- Power rating 1,340 kW
- Design speed: 100 km/h (62 mph)
- Minimum curve negotiation radius: 80 m (260 ft)
- Length over coupler centres: 16,400 mm (650 in)
- Diesel engine model CAT3512
- Application: Mixed traffic on main line
