= CRRC Chengdu =

CRRC Chengdu Co., Ltd.
- Native name: 中车成都机车车辆有限公司
- Industry: Engineering
- Predecessor: Chengdu Locomotive & Rolling Stock Plant
- Founded: 1952; 74 years ago as "Chengdu Locomotive & Rolling Stock Plant"
- Headquarters: Chengdu, Sichuan, China
- Products: Rolling stock, Metal structures
- Parent: CRRC
- Website: crrcgc.cc/cdjcen

CRRC Chengdu Co., Ltd. (Chinese: 中车成都机车车辆有限公司; lit. 'CRRC Chengdu Locomotive & Rolling Stock Co.', 'Ltd.'), is a railway rolling stock manufacturing company, a subsidiary of CRRC, which is located in Chengdu, Sichuan, China, established in 1952, as Chengdu Locomotive & Rolling Stock Plant. In 2007 the company was affiliated in CSR, and renamed CSR Chengdu Locomotive & Rolling Stock Co. Ltd. In 2015, as of the merger of CSR and CNR, CRRC was established, the company was renamed.
