= CRCC High-tech Equipment =

CRCC High-tech Equipment Corporation Limited known also as CRCCE is a Chinese railway track maintenance machinery manufacturer. It is a subsidiary of China Railway Construction Corporation Limited (CRCC), in turn an indirect subsidiary of the Chinese Central Government.

The "foreigner share" (H share) of the company floats in the Hong Kong Stock Exchange since 2015.
