= CNR Group =

Train manufacturer in China

China Northern Locomotive & Rolling Stock Industry (Group) Corporation, commonly known as CNR Group, was a Chinese locomotive and rolling stock manufacturer, and later holding company of China CNR.

CNR Group merged with CSR Group in 2015 to form CRRC.

== History ==
In 1986 the China National Railway Locomotive & Rolling Stock Industry Corporation (LORIC) was formed, comprising 35 production sites and 4 research centres. In 2002 the China Northern Locomotive & Rolling Stock Industry (Group) Corporation was spin-off from LORIC. Its main competitor, the China South Locomotive and Rolling Stock Industry (Group) Corporation was formed in the same year. Both CNR Group and CSR Group were also transferred from the Ministry of Railways to the State-owned Assets Supervision and Administration Commission of the State Council at that time.

CNR Group carried out import and export orders between 1998 and 2005 through the LORIC Import & Export Corp., Ltd. The subsidiary CNR Logistic Development Corp., Ltd., established in 1998 deals with export sales of CNR vehicles and parts.

In November 2005, CNR Group signed a 669 million euro agreement with Siemens under CEO Klaus Kleinfeld that gave them access to the intellectual property jewels of the latter. The first of these trains were to run in 2008 on the Beijing-Tianjin route. Only the first three of 60 trains were to be built in Germany. The balance were built in Tangshan, Hebei Province at the plant which is now named CRRC Tangshan.

In 2008, a new Special purpose vehicle was incorporated, receiving major assets of the group and floated in both Shanghai and Hong Kong Stock Exchange. Some auxiliary assets of the group remained unlisted. The holding company also formed a new investment vehicle CNR Ship & Ocean Engineering Development in ship building. Chonghe Marine Industry was a minority shareholder in that vehicle .

In 2015 CNR Group absorbed CSR Group, and renamed to CRRC Group; the flagship subsidiaries, China CNR and CSR, also merged as CRRC.

== Exports ==
- DF7G-C for Ferrocarriles de Cuba
