= CRRC Ziyang =

Chinese locomotive manufacturer

CRRC Ziyang Co., Ltd.
- Native name: 中车资阳机车有限公司
- Formerly: CSR Ziyang Locomotive
- Type: Subsidiary
- Industry: mechanical engineering
- Founded: 1966-Present part of CSR Corp., Ltd. 2008
- Headquarters: Ziyang, China
- Products: Locomotives, reciprocating engines, engine and locomotives parts, castings and forgings (crankshafts)
- Parent: CRRC
- Website: crrcgc.cc/zyjcen

CRRC Ziyang Co., Ltd. (Chinese: 中车资阳机车有限公司; lit. 'CRRC Ziyang Locomotive Co.', 'Ltd.') is a Chinese locomotive manufacturer, one of the subsidiaries of CRRC. The plant was located in Ziyang, Sichuan Province.

== History ==
CRRC Ziyang Co., Ltd. (hereinafter referred to as The company) is a subsidiary of CRRC Corporation Limited, and which it is an important rail transit equipment enterprise in China. Over the years, the company committed to build a core enterprise of characteristic and advanced rail transit equipment.

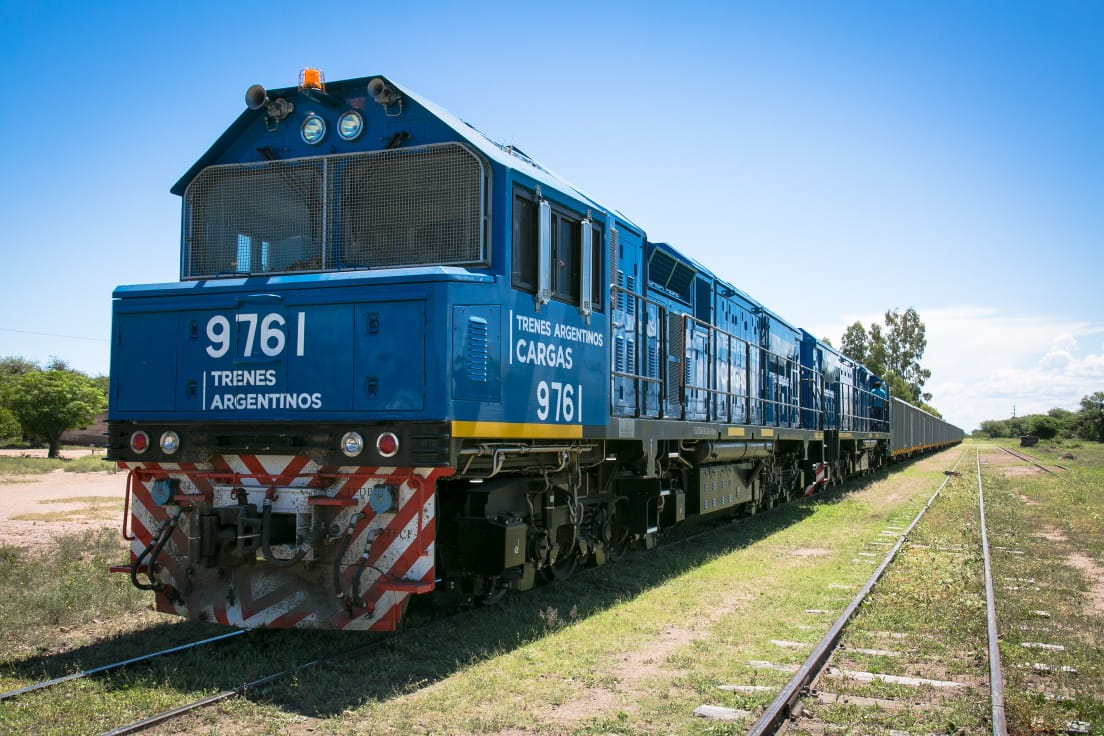
CDD6A1 locomotive used in freight trains in Argentina

The company was established in 1966. Over the past 50 years, the company has produced more than 7000 units of various types of diesel and electric locomotives, which have been radiated to the national railways, local (joint venture) railways, metallurgy, petrochemical, mining and other industries. It has been exported more than 1000 units diesel locomotives to more 30 countries in Asia, Africa, America, and Australia. And more than 95% of the products exported to countries along the "Belt and Road" such as Kazakhstan, Turkmenistan, and Pakistan.

The company's main business includes: locomotive business (manufacture and modernization of electric locomotives/diesel locomotives, locomotive maintenance services and manufacture of hybrid locomotive etc.); New-mode rail transit business (hanging monorail train, mountain rack locomotive and other special vehicles); engine business (locomotive engines, marine engines, gas engines, diesel and gas generator sets, power station EPC project etc.); superior spare parts business (medium-speed engine all-fiber forged steel crankshafts, large forged castings, etc.); and new industry business etc.

The company has a national-level technology center, and has passed the "China National Laboratory" accreditation, which it is a national first-level measurement organization; the company has passed the ISO9001 Quality Management System version 2015, ISO14001:2015 Environmental Management System and ISO45001:2018 Occupational Health and Safety Management system certification.

- In 1966, factory was addressed in Ziyang.
- In 1973, successful trial production of the first shunting diesel locomotive.
- In 1983, successful trial production of the first mainline diesel locomotive.
- In 1992, it is the first time that commercialized diesel locomotive – CK5 has been exported to overseas.
- In 2001, the first batch of 10 mainline locomotives were exported to Vietnam – the first entry into foreign mainline diesel locomotives market.
- In 2006, it is the first time that Chinese locomotive manufacturing technology has been exported to overseas.
- In 2009, the first unit of HXD large-power AC electric locomotive off the assembly line.
- In 2011, it is the first time that AC-transmission diesel locomotive has been exported to developed country.
- In 2012, the first power plant EPC project of CRRC was completed.
- In 2014, The first seven-hundred exported diesel locomotive off the assembly line.
- In 2015, the hybrid locomotive with world’s largest power off the assembly line.
- In 2015, CNR and CSR reorganized and merged to form CRRC – the company changed its name to "CRRC Ziyang Co., Ltd."
- In 2016, the first commercialized new energy hanging rail (Panda Air Rail) in China rolls off the assembly line.
- In 2017, the first meter gauge diesel locomotive CDD6A1 exported to South America.
- In 2018, the first overseas Substation was successfully handed over to the owner – the Bangladesh Substation project was put into commercial operation.
- In 2019, the company's new energy locomotive 28T Battery locomotive off the assembly line.
- In August 2020, the company's self-developed hybrid locomotive with the world's largest power is the first hybrid locomotive in China to get the "Type Certificate" and "Manufacturing License" which issued by the State Railway Administration.
- In 2021, the company pioneers to complete the hybrid modernization of old diesel locomotives in China.
- In 2022, the company rolls out China’s first proprietary rack-and-pinion train and delivers the first commercialized HXN6 hybrid locomotives, pioneering new frontiers in specialized and green rail transit.
- In 2023, the company completes its largest export order to Turkmenistan in a decade, delivering 30 high-power mainline freight locomotives.
- In 2024, the company exports the world’s most powerful narrow-gauge AC locomotives to Sierra Leone, debuting the global-first middle-corridor layout.

== Products ==
CRRC Ziyang's major products are crankshafts, locomotives, gas and diesel engines, mechanical parts for engines and castings and forgings.

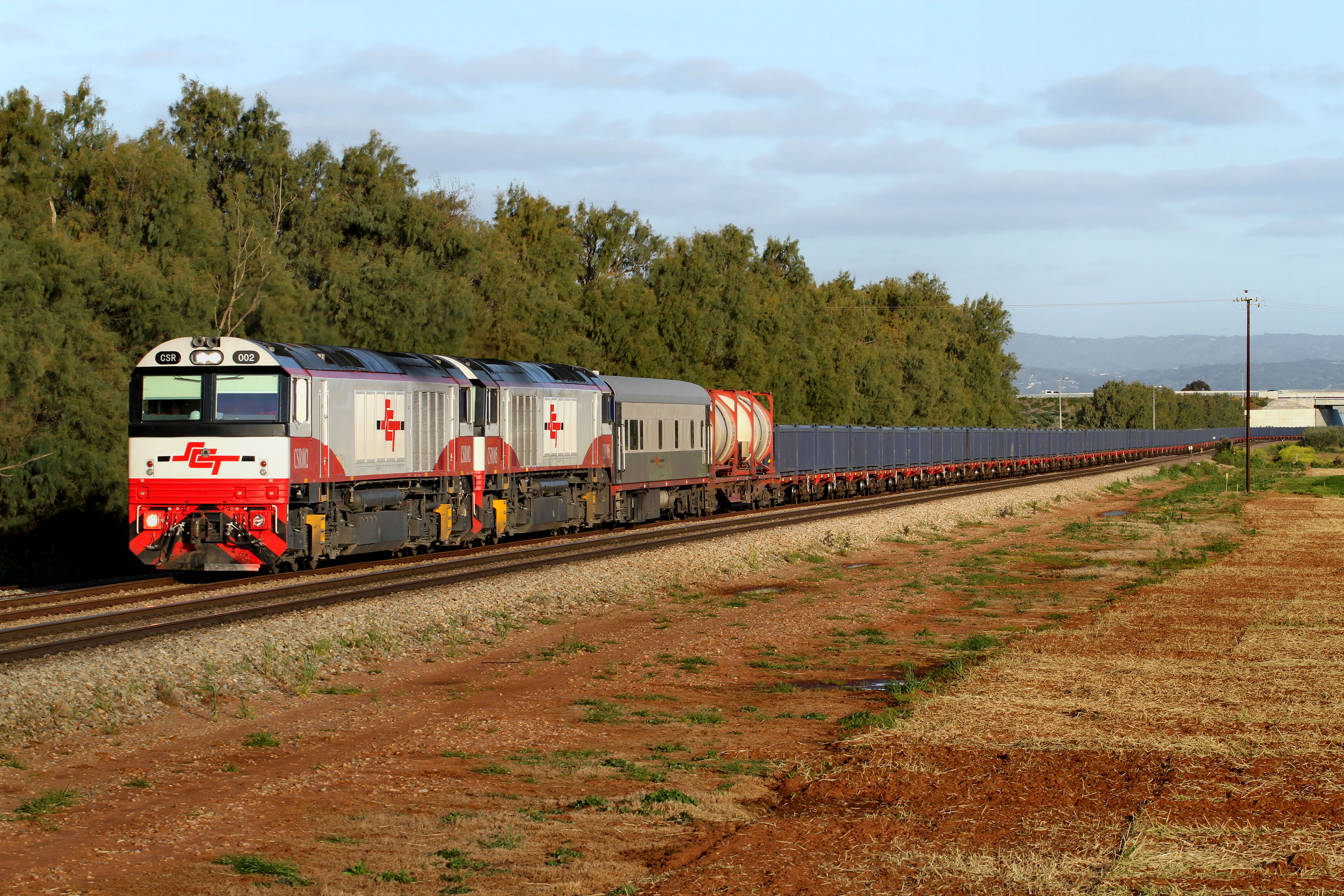
SDA1 AC-AC DE Locomotive, Heavy Duty Freight Transportation in Australia

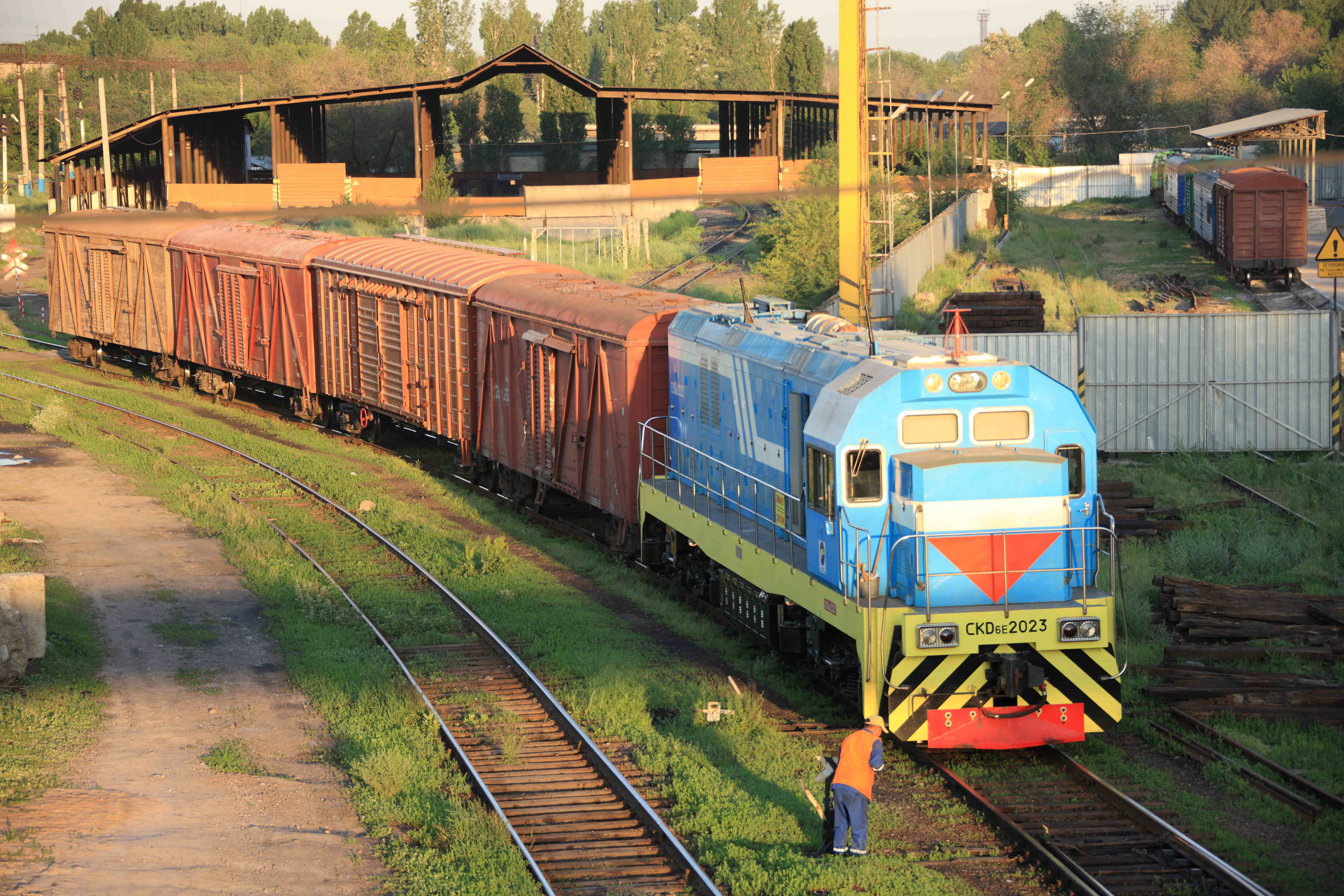
CKD6E locomotive used in freight trains in Kazakhstan

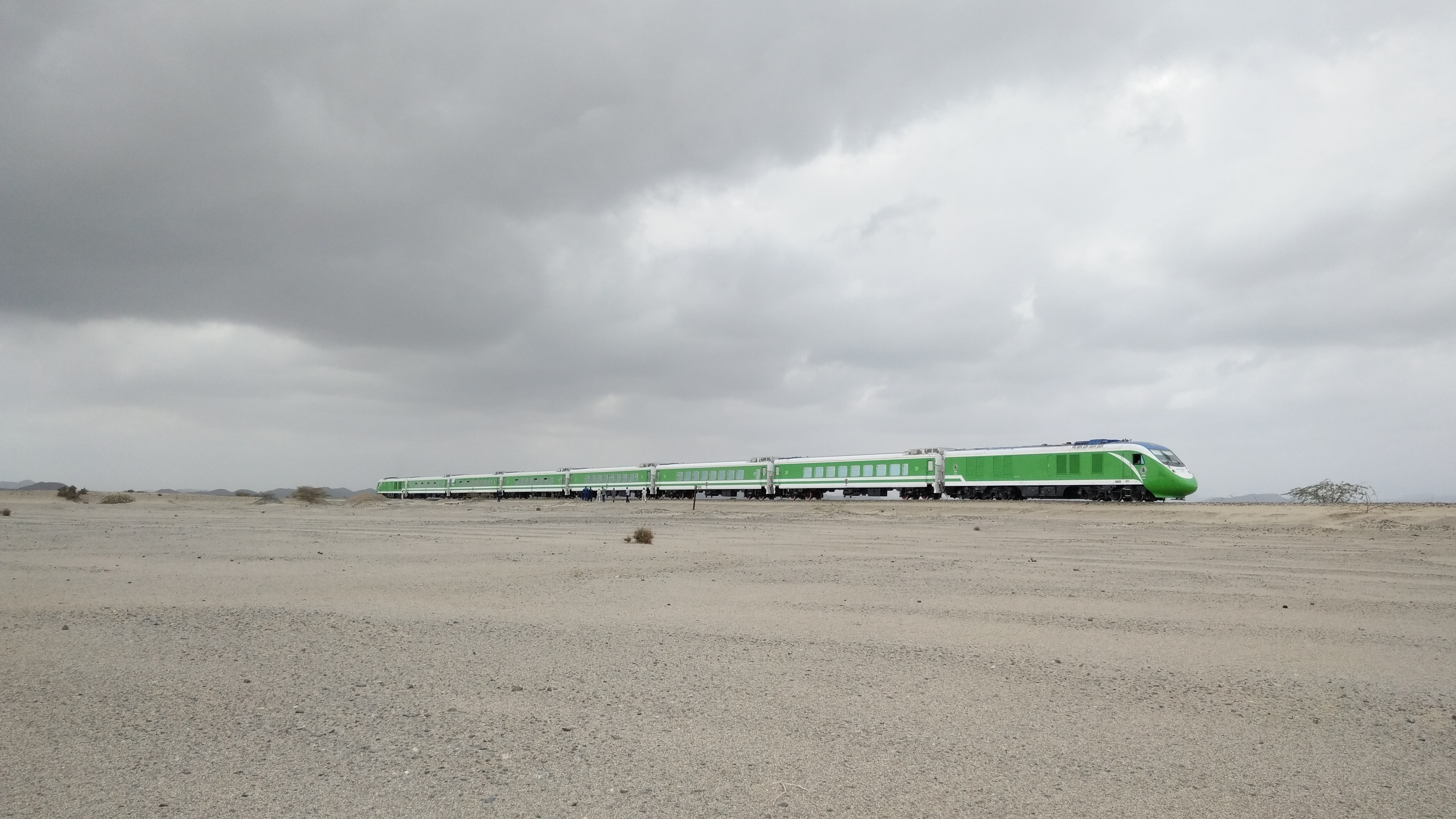
HD100B DMU operating in the Sahara

=== Diesel-Hydraulic Locomotive Platform ===
- CK6 Diesel Locomotive
- CK5C Diesel Locomotive
- GK1C Diesel Locomotive

=== AC-DC Diesel Locomotive Platform ===
- SDD10 Diesel Locomotive
- CKD6E Diesel Locomotive
- SDD1A Diesel Locomotive
- SDD1 Diesel Locomotive
- CKD7F (D19E) Diesel Locomotive
- SDD2 Diesel Locomotive
- SDD3 (D19Er) Diesel Locomotive
- SDD22 (ZCU20) Diesel Locomotive
- SDD23(ZCU30) Diesel Locomotive
- CDD6A1 Diesel Locomotive
- CKD9C Diesel Locomotive
- CKD9A Diesel Locomotive
- DF8B Diesel Locomotive

=== AC Diesel Locomotive Platform ===
- SDA4 (TPIPL, ITD) Diesel Locomotive
- SDA1 (CSR Class, QBX) Diesel Locomotive

=== DMU ===
- HD100A DMU
- HD100B DMU

=== New Energy Locomotive ===
- HXN6 Hybrid Locomotive
