= CSR Corporation Limited =

Former Chinese railway rolling stock manufacturer

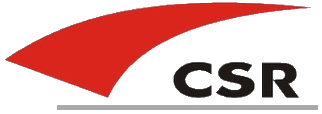
- Native name: 中国南车集团公司
- Formerly: China South Locomotive & Rolling Stock Corporation Limited
- Type: public
- Traded as: SSE: 601766 (A share); SEHK: 1766 (H share)
- Industry: manufacturing
- Predecessor: major assets of CSR Group
- Founded: December 28, 2007; 18 years ago
- Defunct: June 1, 2015; 11 years ago
- Fate: Merged with China CNR to form CRRC in 2015
- Successor: CRRC
- Headquarters: Beijing, China
- Area served: China; Asia
- Products: locomotive; rolling stock
- Parent: CSR Group

CSR Corporation Limited (CSR), formerly known as China South Locomotive & Rolling Stock Corp was a Chinese manufacturer of locomotive and rolling stock.

In 2015, the company merged with China CNR to form CRRC.

== History ==
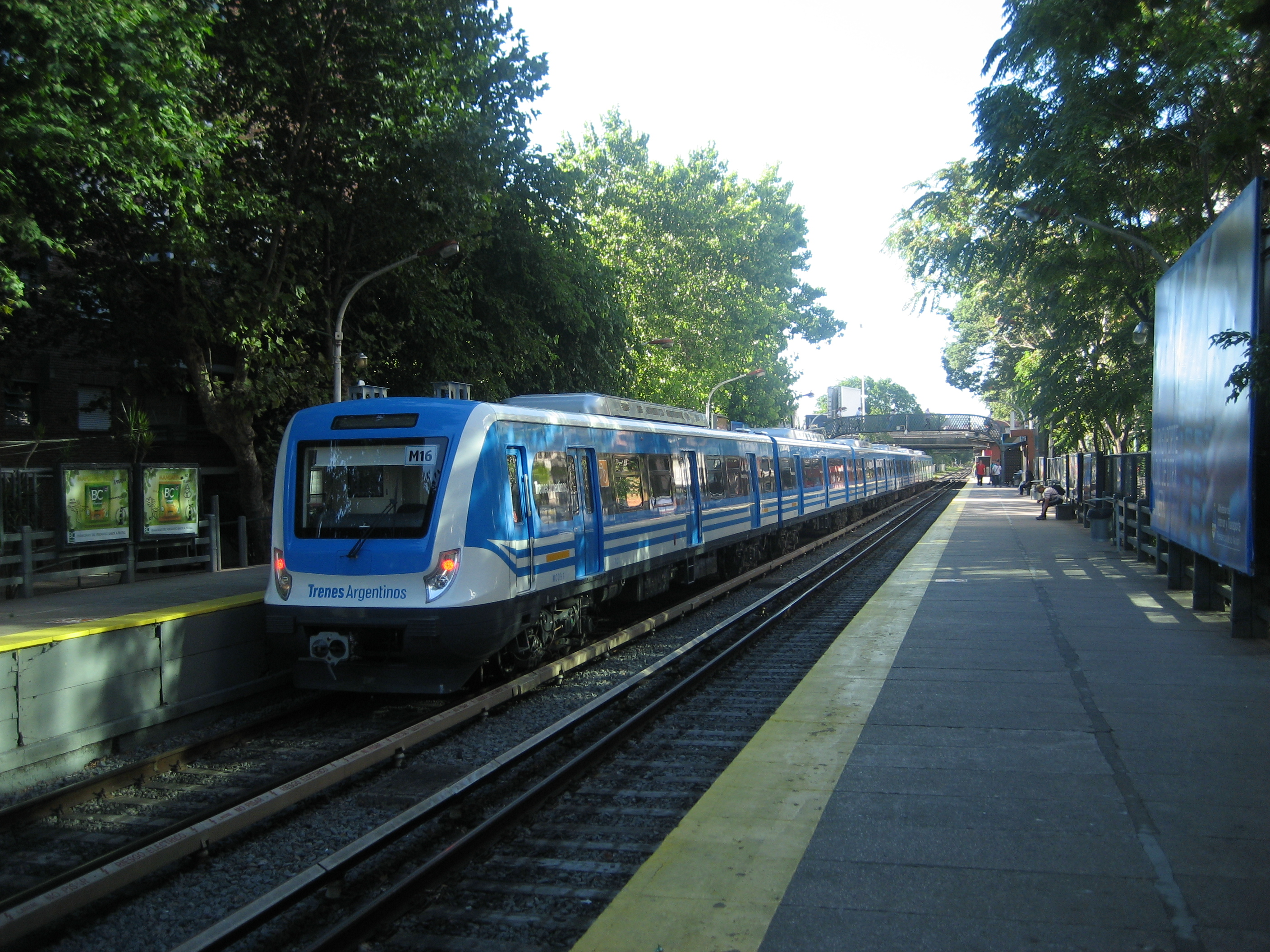
A CSR Electric Multiple Unit on the Mitre Line in Argentina

In 2007 the China South Locomotive & Rolling Stock Corporation Limited (CSR) was formed. as a special purpose vehicle for potential initial public offering for the major assets of state-owned CSR Group. Some auxiliary assets were left in the group and remained unlisted.

The company's H shares were first traded on the Hong-Kong stock market on 21 August 2008, the company's A shares began trading on the 18 August 2008. The shares also began trading on the Shanghai Stock Exchange in August; $1.57 billion was raised in the share offers. A 40% stake in the company was offered in total on the two exchanges.

On 26 December 2011, CSR announced that it had successfully tested a super high speed train that was capable of traveling at 500 km/h.

In February 2014, CSR acquired the Argentine rolling stock manufacturer Emprendimientos Ferroviarios.

=== Merger ===
At the end of 2014 CSR and its rival CNR announced their intention to merge, with a 1:1 share swap; the resultant company (value ~$26billion) was to be named CRRC. The two companies formally merged on 1 June 2015.

== Company structure and subsidiaries ==
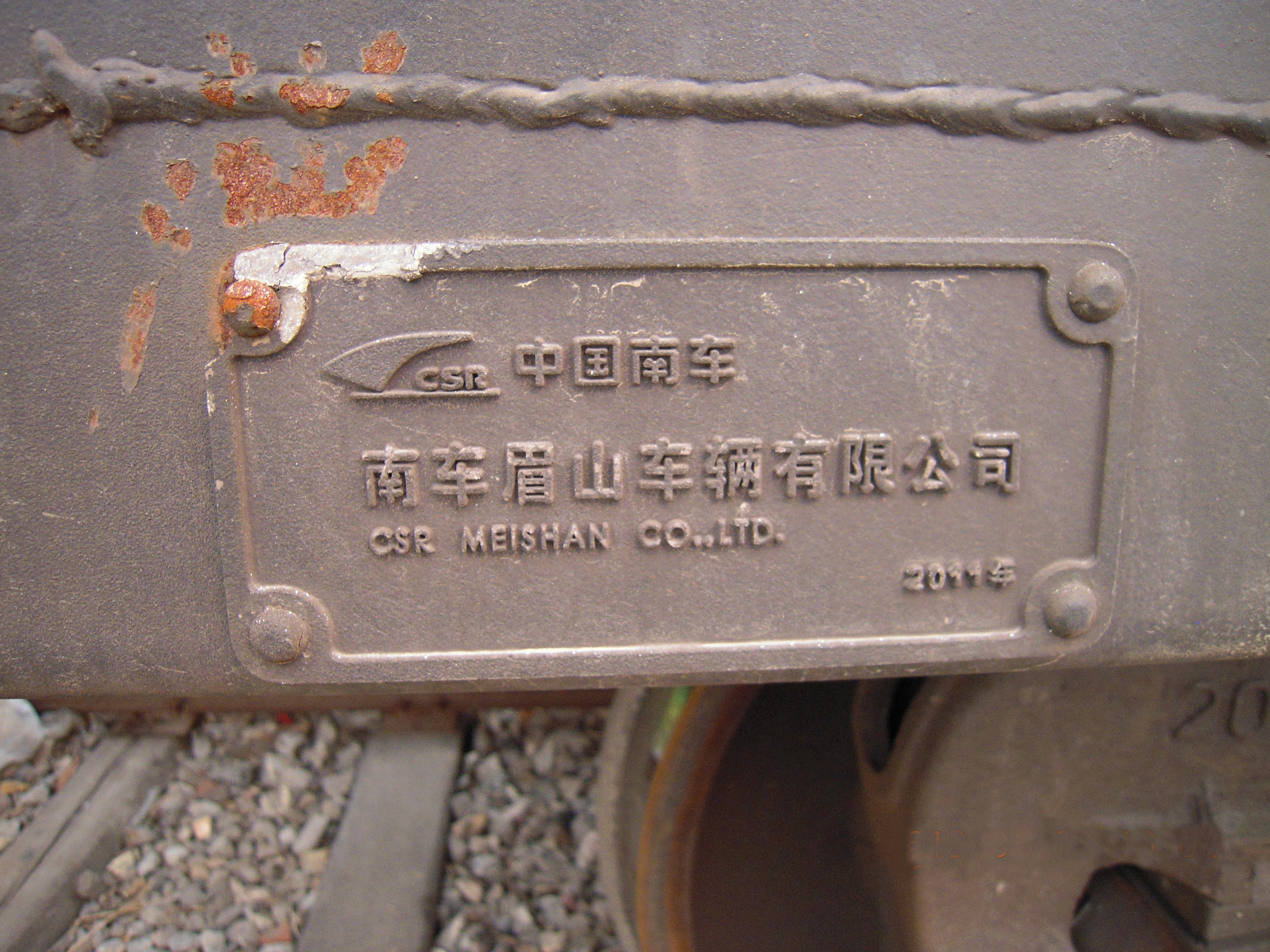
A label of CSR Meishan Company on a train

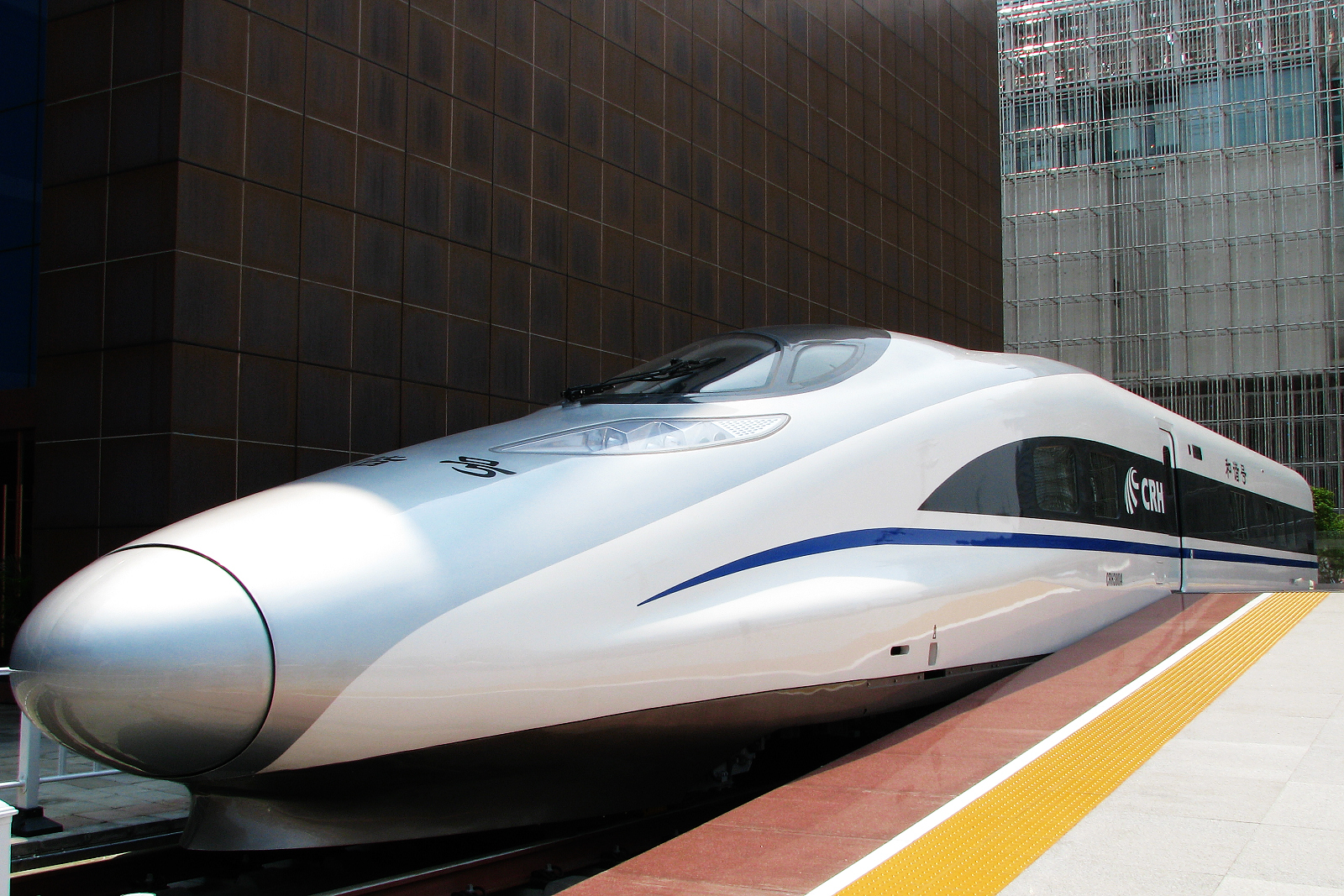
The CRH380A electric high-speed train developed by CSR and manufactured by Sifang Locomotive and Rolling Stock Company

At the time of the restructuring and share issue in 2008 the company had 20 subsidiaries:

Manufacturing and maintenance

- CSR Chengdu Locomotive & Rolling Stock Co, refurbishment of locomotives and carriages, manufacture and repair of motors.
- CSR Feb. 7th Rolling Stock Co., Ltd., manufacture and maintenance of freight wagons.
- CSR Luoyang Locomotive Co, refurbishment of locomotives.
- CSR Meishan Rolling Stock Co., Ltd., manufacture of freight wagons, brakes and castings.
- CRRC Nanjing Puzhen, manufacture of carriages, multiple units and rapid transit vehicles.
- CRRC Qishuyan, manufacture and maintenance of diesel locomotives
- CSR Shijiazhuang Rolling Stock Co, maintenance of freight wagons, R&D of air-conditioning and refrigeration devices.
  - Shijiazhuang Guoxiang Transportation Equipment Co., Ltd., 60% owned subsidiary, joint enterprise with King Machinery (Taiwan) Co., Limited.
- CSR Sifang Locomotive & Rolling Stock Co., Ltd., Manufacture of carriages and multiple units, and auxiliary products. EMU and carriage maintenance. Renamed CSR Qingdao Sifang Locomotive & Rolling Stock Co., Ltd, (CSR Sifang Co., Ltd.) on 29 December 2008.
- CSR Sifang Rolling Stock Co., Ltd., maintenance and manufacture of carriages and multiple units.
- CSR Yangtze Rolling Stock Co., Ltd., (Note: CSR Yangtze Rolling Stock Co., Ltd. was formed from the assets of CSR Qishuyan Locomotive & Rolling Stock Works (freight wagon assets), CSR Wuhan Jiang’an Rolling Stock Works, CSR Zhuzhou Rolling Stock Works, CSR Tongling Rolling Stock Works and CSR Wuchang Rolling Stock Works. Source: CSR Prospectus, 8 August 2008, "Restructuring", p.85) freight and refrigerated wagon manufacturing and maintenance, carriage and rapid transit vehicle maintenance, manufacture of axles, casting and other steel structures
- CSR Zhuzhou Electric Locomotive Co, R&D and manufacture of electric locomotives, multiple units and rapid transit vehicles, and electric motors, transformers and related products.
- Zhuzhou CSR Times Electric Co, development and sale of traction and auxiliary electrical power equipment and urban rail control system.
- CSR Ziyang Locomotive Co, R&D and manufacturing of diesel and electric locomotives, and diesel and gas powered engines and sub-components.
- CSR Xiangfan Locomotive Co., Ltd., refurbishment of locomotives.
- Emprendimientos Ferroviarios, the company's subsidiary in Argentina.

Research

- CSR Zhuzhou Electric Locomotive Research Institute Co., Ltd., R&D and manufacture of electric propulsion and control, suspension and noise reducing elements, polymer composites and insulators.
- CSR Qishuyan Locomotive & Rolling Stock Technology Research Institute Co., Ltd., R&D of mechanical transmissions, brakes, shock absorbers and manufacturing techniques.

Export and leasing

- New Leap Transportation Equipment Investment & Leasing Co., Ltd., investment in, leasing, sale, and technical support of rail vehicles. (Renamed CSR Investment and Leasing on 2 December 2008)

Other

- CSR (Hong Kong) Co. Ltd. based in Hong Kong was formed as 100% subsidiary in 2008.

=== Joint ventures ===
- Bombardier Sifang (Qingdao) Transportation, formed 1998, with CSR Sifang, 50% owned by Bombardier Transportation, design and manufacture of single and double deck passenger carriages and EMUs
- Qingdao Sifang Kawasaki Rolling Stock Technology Co., Ltd., formed 2005, 50% owned by Kawasaki Heavy Industries (39%) and Itochu (11%), R&D and technical support for railway vehicles and import and export thereof.

== Manufacturing and products ==
The main factories for the manufacture of locomotives are installed in Zhuzhou (electric locomotives), Ziyang, Luoyang, Xiangfan (diesel locomotives), Qishuyan, and Chengdu (the latter two also producing carriages). Carriages are built in factories in Nanjing, Zhuzhou, Beijing, Meishan, Wuchang, Tongling, Shijiazhuang, Wuhan and Guiyang. The company has two research institutes in Zhuzhou and Qishuyan.

=== Models ===
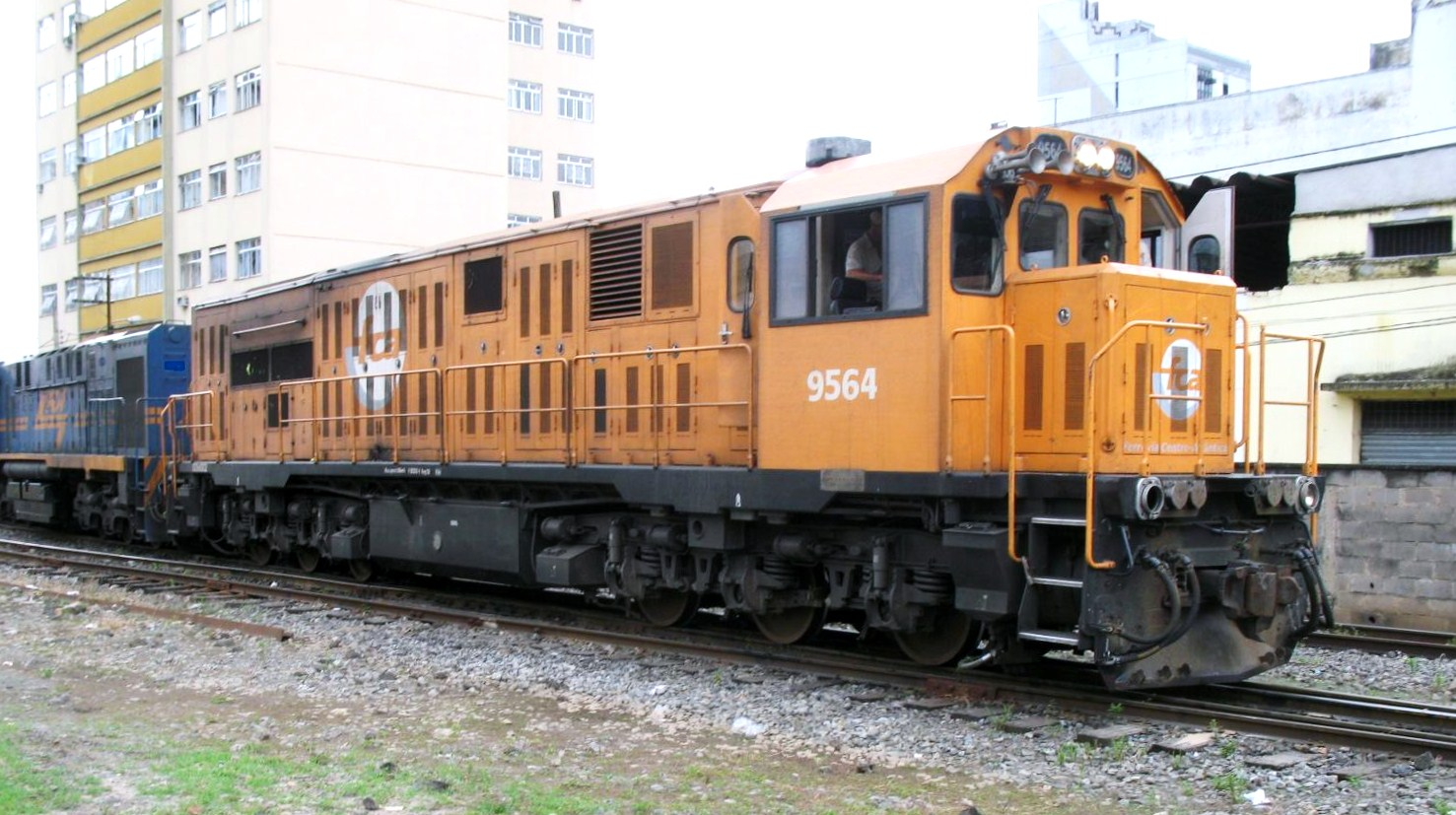
CSR SDD8 FCA (Ferrovia Centro-Atlântica) nº9564. Brazil.

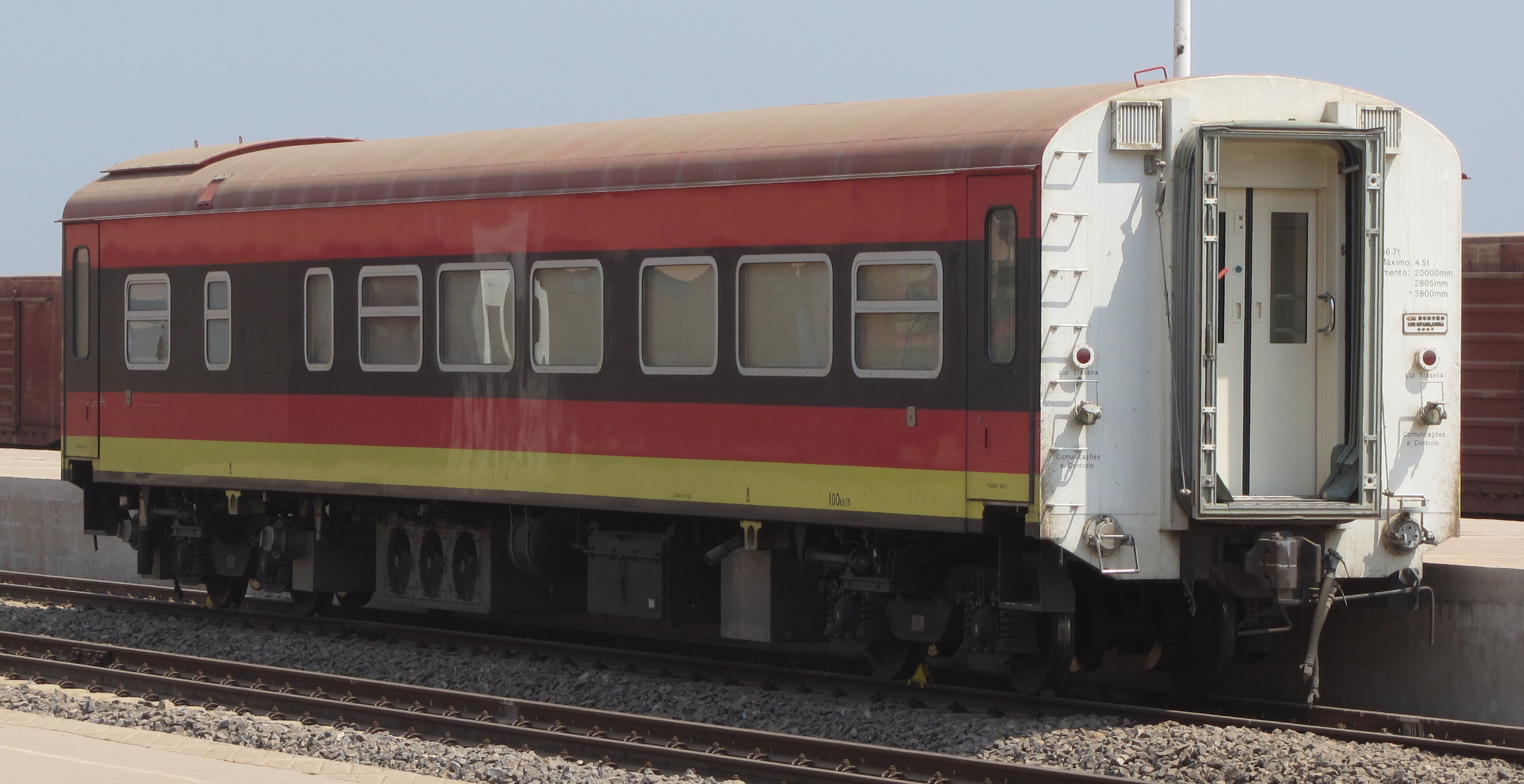
Passenger car built for Luanda Railway in Angola.

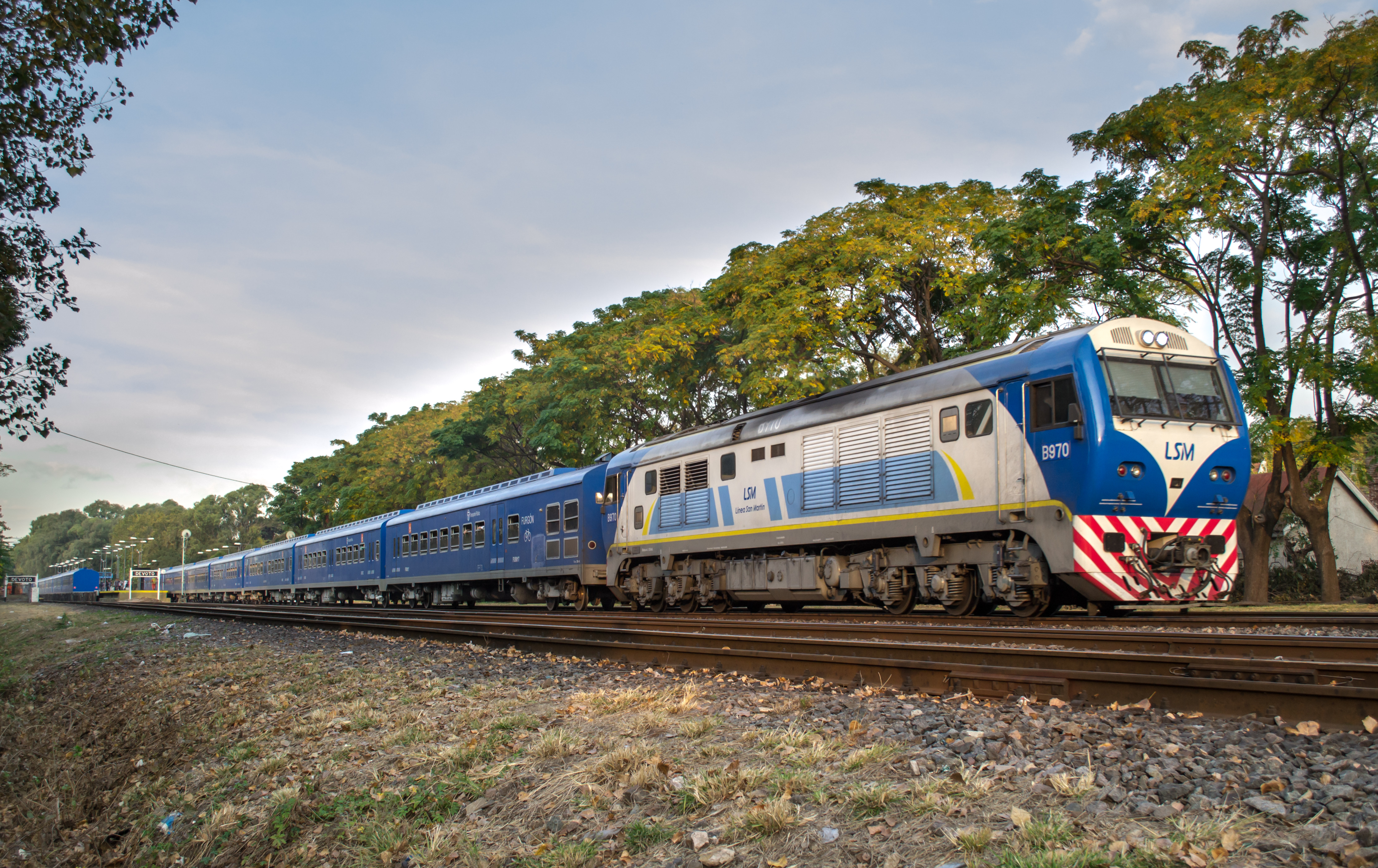
CSR SDD7 locomotive and coaches for San Martín line of Argentina.

Main models manufactured:

- Electric locomotives:
  - Type TM1
  - Type KZ4A high-speed
  - Type DJ2 "Olympic star"
  - SS series, including SS3, SS4, SS6, SS8, SS9 and their varieties
  - AC4000 test bed
  - Type HXD1 "Harmony": Orders have been placed for 1710 units and production capacity has been increased to 800 units per year.
- EMUs
  - High-speed train "China Star"
  - High-speed train "Central China Star"
- Diesel locomotives
  - Qishuyan-built diesels for Guinea
  - Type DF4B, DF4C, DF4D and varieties
  - Type DF5B
  - Type DF8B and varieties
  - Type DF11 and DF11G for passenger trains
  - Type DF12 Shunter
  - Diesel-hydraulic locomotives DFH 3 and DFH 5
  - Yard shunters GK & GKD series, in several gauges ranging from 762 to 1435 mm.
- DMUs
  - Type DDJ1

The firm also built subway trains, particularly for networks in Shanghai Metro and Beijing Subway.

=== Exports ===
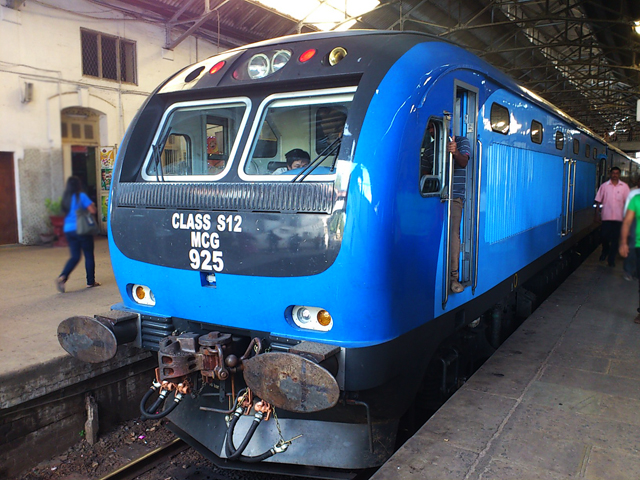
Sri Lanka Railways Class S12 trainset, manufactured by CSR.

- In October 2008, China Southern Locomotive won a contract worth nearly $100 million from Kazakhstan, its third contract since entering that country's market in 2002.
- CSR supplies diesel-multiple units to Sri Lanka Railways. In 2008, CSR began exporting short-haul DMUs to Sri Lanka, for use on commuter-rail services. As of 2011, long-haul units are on order.
- CSR also won a contract worth $391 million from Turkey to produce 324 vehicles for the Ankara Metro. It is envisaged that 75 of the 324 wagons will have at least 30% domestically manufacturer content while the remaining wagons will have 51%.
- On 22 October 2012, South Africa awarded a tender for 95 electric locomotives to CSR Zhuzhou Electric Locomotive works. The plan is part of a R4 trillion (US$462 billion) infrastructure improvement project in the country.
- In 2013, Argentine state-owned company Trenes Argentinos announced that CSR electric multiple units had been acquired for metropolitan services of Buenos Aires. That included 300 cars for Roca Line, and 709 cars for Sarmiento and Mitre lines.
- Baghdad–Basra high-speed rail line

A joint venture between CSRC and Australian-based United Group manufactured MTR with 21 Phase IV LRV cars delivered in 2009.

== Controversy ==
In June 2016 the CSR along with members of the Gupta family were accused of trying to improperly influence the awarding of a R51 billion (US$6 billion) 2012 contract for CSR to deliver 600 trains to the South African Passenger Rail Agency. It was later reported that the future South African Public Protector Busisiwe Mkhwebane was also allegedly implicated in the deal when she worked as Counselor Immigration and Civic Services in South Africa's embassy in China.

== See also ==
- List of locomotives in China
