= CSR Group =

Chinese locomotive and rolling stock manufacturer

CSR Group Corporation
- Formerly: China South Locomotive and Rolling Stock Industry (Group) Corporation
- Type: state-owned enterprise
- Predecessor: Half of China National Railway Locomotive & Rolling Stock Industry Corporation
- Founded: 2002
- Founder: Ministry of Railways
- Defunct: 2015; 11 years ago
- Fate: merged with CNR Group
- Successor: CRRC Group
- Headquarters: Beijing, China
- Revenue: ▲CN¥121.321 billion (2014)
- Operating income: ▲CN¥6.600 billion (2014)
- Net income: ▲CN¥2.613 billion (2014)
- Total assets: ▲CN¥156.782 billion (2014)
- Total equity: ▲CN¥23.987 billion (2014)
- Owner: Chinese Government (100%)
- Parent: SASAC
Subsidiaries
CSR	(57.15%)
South Huiton	(42.64%)

CSR Group Corporation
- Simplified Chinese: 中国南车集团公司
- Traditional Chinese: 中國南車集團公司
Transcriptions
Standard Mandarin
- Hanyu Pinyin: Zhōngguó nánchē jítuán gōngsī

CSR Group
- Simplified Chinese: 南车集团
- Traditional Chinese: 南車集團
Transcriptions
Standard Mandarin
- Hanyu Pinyin: nánchē jítuán

China South Locomotive and Rolling Stock Industry (Group) Corporation
- Simplified Chinese: 中国南方机车车辆工业集团公司
- Traditional Chinese: 中國南方機車車輛工業集團公司
Transcriptions

CSR Group Corporation formerly known as China South Locomotive and Rolling Stock Industry (Group) Corporation (abbreviation: CSRG), was a Chinese locomotive and rolling stock manufacturer. In 2007, the major assets of the group was spin-off and formed CSR Corporation Limited, making the corporation became a holding company only. In 2015 CSR Group was merged with CNR Group to form CRRC Group.

== History ==
In 1986 the China National Railway Locomotive & Rolling Stock Industry Corporation (LORIC) was formed, comprising 35 production sites and 4 research centres. In 2002 LORIC was separated from the Ministry of Railways and China South Locomotive and Rolling Stock Industry (Group) Corporation (CSRG, Chinese: 中国南方机车车辆工业集团公司) was formed. Its main competitor, the China North Locomotive and Rolling Stock Industry (Group) Corporation was formed in the same year.

In 2002 the group manufactured the 270 km/h (170 mph) China Star high speed EMU at the Zhuzhou Electric Locomotive Works.

Since 2003, the group no longer tax-free on property tax and land rent.

Between 2004 and 2007 CSR had ~50% of the internal Chinese market for locomotives and ~80% of the market for multiple units (by volume), as well as a ~50% share in locomotive and wagon refurbishment. In the same period overseas sales accounted for ~7–8% of revenue.

In 2008 most of the assets were floated as China South Locomotive & Rolling Stock Corp., Ltd. (later known as CSR Corporation Limited), except some auxiliary assets, as well as the shares of South Huiton.

In April 2010 the Chinese name of CSR Group was renamed (Chinese: 中国南车集团公司).

== Subsidiaries ==
- CSR Corporation Limited
- South Huiton (42.64%)
- Beijing Railway Industry Trade Corporation
