= China CNR =

Chinese state-owned railway rolling stock manufacturer

- Native name: 中国北车股份有限公司
- Type: Public
- Traded as: SSE: 601299 (A share); SEHK: 6199 (H share)
- Industry: Transport industry
- Founded: 26 June 2008
- Founder: CNR Group
- Defunct: 1 June 2015; 11 years ago
- Fate: merged with CSR
- Successor: CRRC
- Headquarters: Beijing, China
- Area served: China, exported Worldwide
- Key people: Cui Dianguo (Charmian)
- Products: Locomotive; Rolling stock
- Owner: CNR Group
- Parent: CNR Group

China CNR Corporation Limited
- Simplified Chinese: 中国北车股份有限公司
Transcriptions
Standard Mandarin
- Hanyu Pinyin: Zhōngguó běi chē gǔfèn yǒuxiàn gōngsī

CNR
- Simplified Chinese: 中国北车
Transcriptions
Standard Mandarin
- Hanyu Pinyin: Zhōngguó běi chē

China CNR Corporation Limited (CNR) was a primary manufacturer of locomotives and rolling stock for the Chinese market. The company has also exported to over 80 countries and regions, including Argentina, Australia, Brazil, France, Hong Kong, New Zealand. Saudi Arabia, Taiwan and Turkey.

In 2015, the company merged with CSR to form CRRC.

== History ==
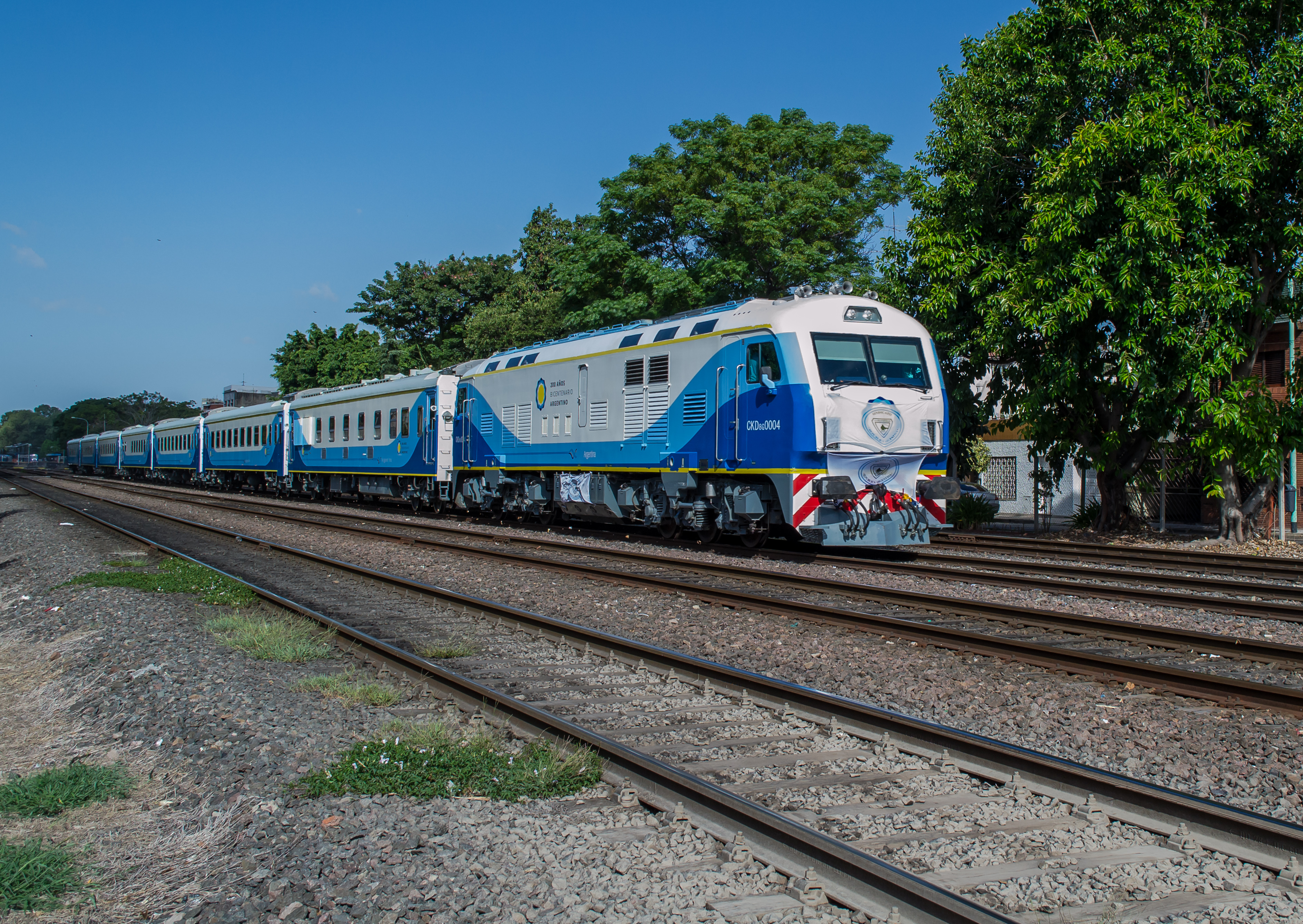
A CNR CKD8G train operated in Argentina for Trenes Argentinos.

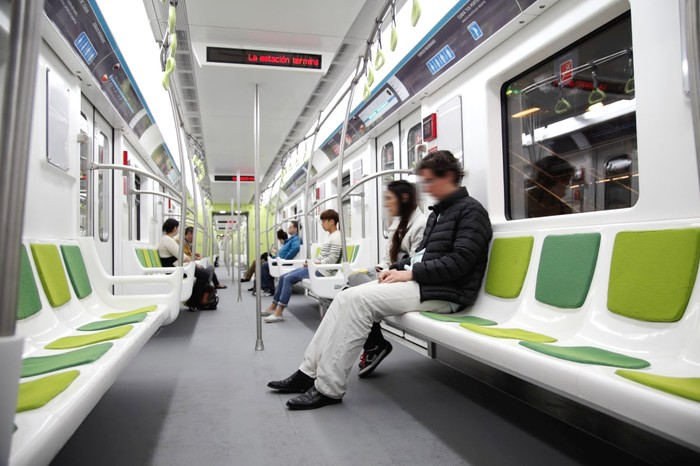
A Buenos Aires Underground 200 Series car on Line A

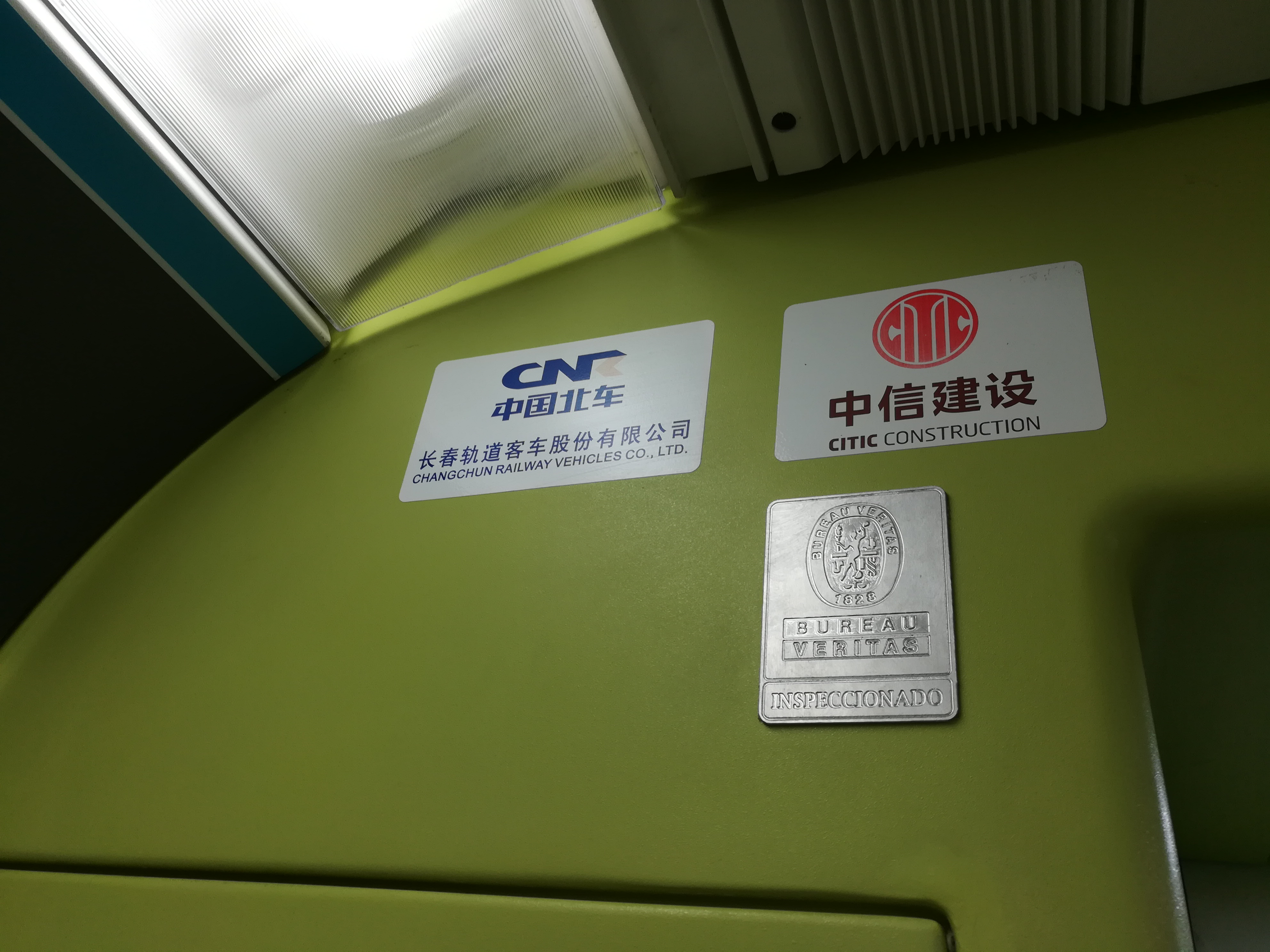
Builder's plate in a Buenos Aires Underground 200 Series

In 2008 China CNR was incorporated as the subsidiary of CNR Group (China Northern Locomotive & Rolling Stock Industry (Group) Corporation). China Chengtong Holdings Group and China Huarong Asset Management were minority shareholders. In the same year CNR Dalian's CKD7C were exported to the Republic of Congo.

The company made an IPO of $2bn in 2009 on the Shanghai stock exchange.

From the early 21st century onwards the group began a strategic diversification into wind turbine manufacture – its first major new facility was a 500 turbine per year capacity factory in Songyuan, (built 2009–11), established through CNR Wind Power Co. The company expects to invest ~35 billion Yuan in CNR Wind Power to establish a full scale wind power industry.

In 2013, the company began providing underground cars for Line A of the Buenos Aires Underground in Argentina, with the 150 cars to make up the entirety of the line. That same year, the company delivered 20 locomotives and 220 coaches to the country for Trenes Argentinos' long distance broad gauge rolling stock.

CNR company began delivering 81 Diesel Multiple Units in 2015 for the Belgrano Sur Line in Buenos Aires, operated by Trenes Argentinos.

In October 2014, CNR made a major breakthrough into the North American market by winning a $567 million contract to supply 284 metro cars for the Massachusetts Bay Transportation Authority's Orange (Type B car) and Red (Type A car) lines, with an option for 58 more. CNR plans to dedicate two manufacturing lines at a Chinese facility and build a 150,000 square-foot facility in Springfield, Massachusetts for final assembly of the vehicles.

At the end of 2014 CNR and rival CSR announced their intention to merge, with CSR acquiring CNR shares at a ratio of 1 CNR : 1.1 CSR; the resultant company (value ~$26 billion) was to be named CRRC. The two companies formally merged on 1 June 2015.

== Manufacturing and research subsidiaries ==
The corporation has numerous subsidiaries at various sites in China:

- Beijing Feb. 7th Railway Transportation Equipment Co., Ltd.
- Beijing Nankou Railway Transportation Machinery Co., Ltd.
- Changchun Railway Coach Co., Ltd.
- Changchun Railway Vehicles Co., Ltd.
- CNR Dalian Locomotive & Rolling Stock Co., Ltd.
- CNR Dalian Locomotive Research Institute Co., Ltd.
- CNR Datong Electric Locomotive Co., Ltd.
- Harbin Railway Rolling Stock Co., Ltd.
- CNR Jinan
- Lanzhou Jinniu Railway Transportation Equipment Co., Ltd.
- Qiqihar Railway Rolling Stock Co., Ltd.
- Qingdao Sifang Rolling Stock Research Institute Co., Ltd.
- Tangshan Railway Vehicle Co., Ltd
- Tangshan Railway Transportation Equipment Co., Ltd.
- Tianjin LJ Railway Transport Equipment Ltd.
- Taiyuan Railway Rolling Stock Co., Ltd.
- Yongji Xinshisu Electric Equipment Co., Ltd.
- Xi'an Railway Rolling Stock Co., Ltd.

== Exports ==
- Buenos Aires Underground 200 Series
- BTS Skytrain EMU-B1 and EMU-B2 Stock
