= E5K =

Family of Russian electric locomotives

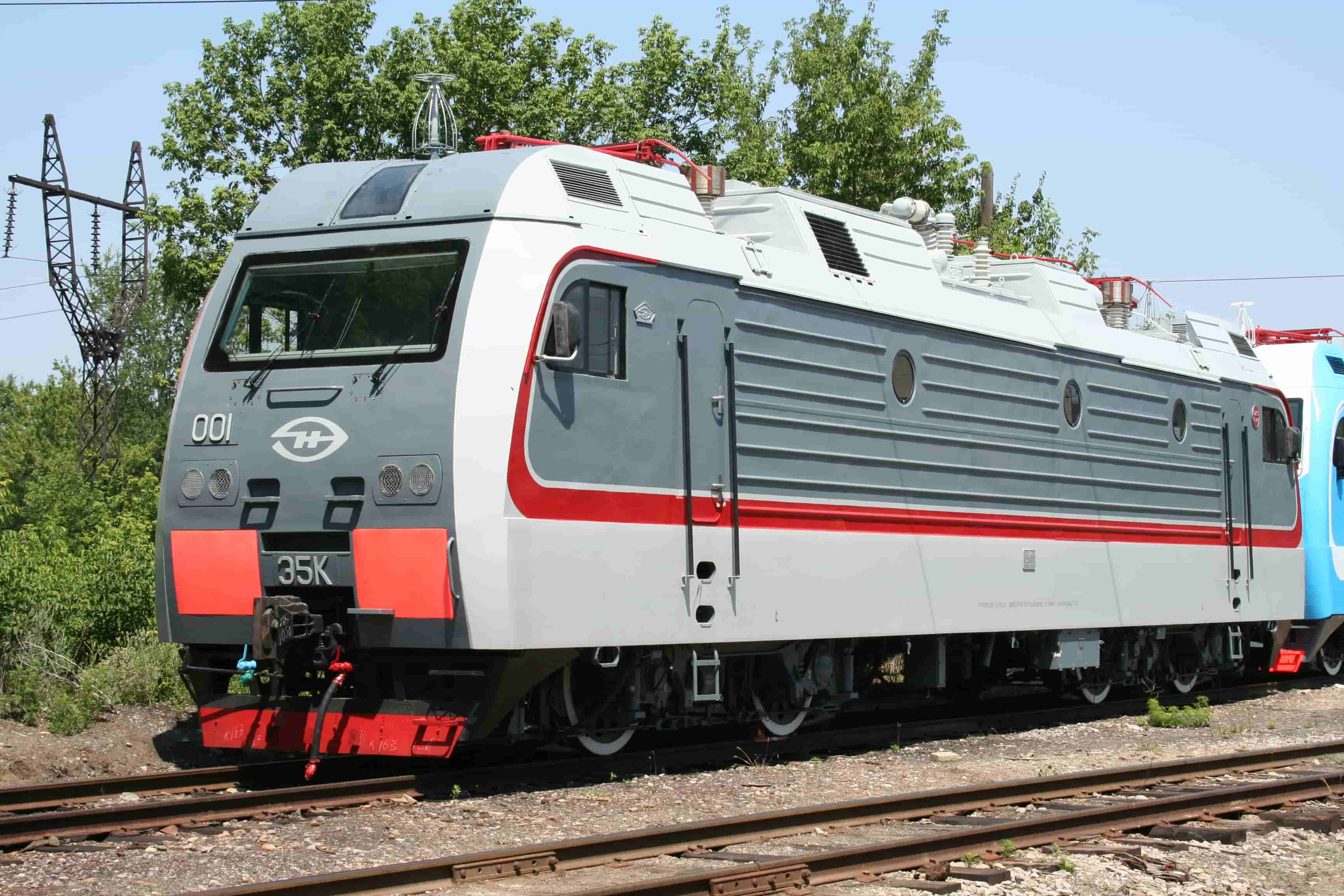
- E5K-001 electric locomotive in 2007
Type and origin
- Power type: Electric
- Builder: Transmashholding
- Build date: E5K: 2007–2009; 2ES5K: from 2004; 3ES5K: from 2007; 4ES5K: from 2014; 2ES5S: 2018; 3ES5S: from 2018; 2EL5: 2005–2011
- Total produced: 2,579: E5K: 32; 2ES5K: 789; 3ES5K: 1648; 4ES5K: 85; 2ES5S: 5; 3ES5S: 2; 2EL5: 18
Specifications
- Configuration
  - UIC: Bo'Bo'
- Gauge: 1,520 mm (4 ft 11 27/32 in)
- Wheel diameter: 1,250–1,160 mm (4 ft 1 in – 3 ft 10 in)
- Minimum curve: 125 m (410 ft 1 in)
- Wheelbase: E5K: 13,200 mm (43 ft 4 in); ES5K: 11,400 mm (37 ft 5 in)
  - Bogie: 2,900 mm (9 ft 6 in)
- Length: E5K: 19,302 mm (63 ft 3.9 in); 2ES5K: 35,004 mm (114 ft 10.1 in); 3ES5K: 52,506 mm (172 ft 3.2 in); 4ES5K: 70,008 mm (229 ft 8.2 in)
- Width: 3,200 mm (10 ft 6 in) (frame); 3,140 mm (10 ft 4 in) (on side walls); 3,500–3,565 mm (11 ft 5.8 in – 11 ft 8.4 in) (mirrors)
- Height: 5,050 mm (16 ft 7 in)
- Axle load: E5K: 245.2 kN (55,100 lb_{f}), 25 tonnes (25 long tons; 28 short tons); 2/3ES5K: 235.4 kN (52,900 lb_{f}), 24 tonnes (24 long tons; 26 short tons); 4ES5K: 235.8 kN (53,000 lb_{f}), 24.5 tonnes (24.1 long tons; 27.0 short tons)
- Service weight: E5K: 100 tonnes (98 long tons; 110 short tons); 2ES5K; with slip MOP: 2 by 96 tonnes (2.0 by 94.5 long tons; 2.2 by 105.8 short tons); with rolling MOP: 2 by 98 tonnes (2.0 by 96.5 long tons; 2.2 by 108.0 short tons); with rolling MOP and axial adjustment: 2 by 100 tonnes (2.0 by 98.4 long tons; 2.2 by 110.2 short tons); 3ES5K; with slip MOP: 2 by 96 tonnes (2.0 by 94.5 long tons; 2.2 by 105.8 short tons); with rolling MOP: 2 by 98 tonnes (2.0 by 96.5 long tons; 2.2 by 108.0 short tons); with rolling MOP and axial adjustment: 2 by 100 tonnes (2.0 by 98.4 long tons; 2.2 by 110.2 short tons); 4ES5K: 2 by 98 tonnes (2.0 by 96.5 long tons; 2.2 by 108.0 short tons)
- Electric system/s: 25 kV 50 Hz AC
- Current pickup: Pantograph
- Traction motors: "Ermak": NB-514B or NB-514E; "Ataman": asynchronous DTA-1100
- Gear ratio: 88:21=4,19
- Loco brake: Regenerative
- Safety systems: KLUB, TSKBM, SAUT-CM/485
- Couplers: SA-3 coupler
Performance figures
- Maximum speed: 110 km/h (68 mph)
- Power output
  - 1 hour: 3,280 kW (4,400 hp)
  - Continuous: 3,060 kW (4,100 hp)
- Tractive effort: 339 kN (76,000 lb_{f}), 75 kN (17,000 lb_{f}) at maximum speed
- Brakeforce: 225 kN (51,000 lb_{f}) at 50 km/h (31 mph); 150 kN (34,000 lb_{f}) at 80 km/h (50 mph); 125 kN (28,000 lb_{f}) at 90 km/h (56 mph)
Career
- Operators: Russian Railways; Ukrainian Railways; Uzbekistan Railways
- Official name: Ермак (Ermak) (Note: For E5K, 2ES5K, 3ES5K, 4ES5K locomotives.), Атаман (Ataman) (Note: For 2ES5S, 3ES5S locomotives.)
- Locale: Russia: Far Eastern Railway; East Siberian Railway; Transbaikal Railway; Krasnoyarsk Railway; October Railway; Gorky Railway; Privolzhskaya Railway; North Caucasus Railway; South Urals Railway; Ukraine: Odesa Railways

The E5K and ES5K (Russian: Э5К, ЭС5К, named "Ermak", Russian: Ермак) are a family of Russian mainline freight AC electric locomotives with a voltage of 25 kV, featuring four-axle units equipped with collector traction motors. Different versions: E5K, 2ES5K, 3ES5K, 4ES5K — are distinguished by the number of units according to the prefix (2, 3, 4 — number of units, E — electric locomotive, S — sectional, 5 — model number (5th series), K — collector traction electric motors). These locomotives are the next evolutionary step in the development of the VL80 family of freight electric locomotives and are positioned as their main replacement.

The electric locomotives were developed by the All-Union Scientific and Research, Planning and Design Technological Institute on Electric Locomotives (VElNII) in Novocherkassk and have been produced since 2004 at the Novocherkassk Electric Locomotive Plant, which is part of the Transmashholding group. They are the most widely produced family of Russian electric locomotives currently in service. One of the variants: the 2ES5K and the 2EL5 locomotives — were produced at the Luhansk Locomotive Plant. As of December 2022, a total of 2,561 ES5K locomotives of various modifications had been produced, and including 18 units of the 2EL5 modification made at the Luhansk plant, the total comes to 2,579. The vast majority of them are operated in Russia, mainly in Siberia and the Far East, with a few 2ES5K locomotives and all 2EL5 units also operating in Ukraine. Additionally, a new line, the ES5S "Ataman" (Russian: Атаман) featuring asynchronous traction motors instead of collector motors, was developed based on the ES5K family, resulting in 4 units of the 2ES5S and 2 units of the 3ES5S locomotives being built.

== History ==
=== Origins ===
In the early 2000s, Russia faced the need to replace its fleet of freight electric locomotives. The main manufacturer of electric locomotives in the USSR and Russia for a long time was the Novocherkassk Electric Locomotive Plant (NEVZ), which until 1994 built 12-axle VL85 series electric locomotives and 8-axle VL80^{S} series locomotives, developed back in the Soviet era. However, starting from 1995, the production of freight locomotives was stopped due to the need to begin manufacturing domestic passenger electric locomotives in Russia, because the basis of passenger electric locomotives consisted of the ChS locomotives from the Czech Republic, and simultaneous production of freight and passenger locomotives was impossible due to the economic crisis.

By the early 2000s, the plant had mastered the production of EP1 AC passenger locomotives with a microprocessor control system, and it was tasked with organizing mass production of eight-axle freight locomotives to replace the VL10/VL11 DC electric locomotives and the VL80 AC electric locomotives. Restarting production of these series was out of the question since they were outdated and did not meet the modern requirements for comfort, energy efficiency, and safety. Considering the urgent need to replace the locomotive fleet in the eastern regions of Russia along the Trans-Siberian Railway, where AC locomotives of the VL60 and VL80 series operating at 25 kV were run under tough conditions and many were heavily worn out, the first thing decided was to create a two-unit AC freight locomotive to quickly modernize the railway’s fleet with modern locomotives. At the same time, unlike the VL11 and VL80, it was decided to standardize the mechanical parts of the new DC and AC locomotives as much as possible.

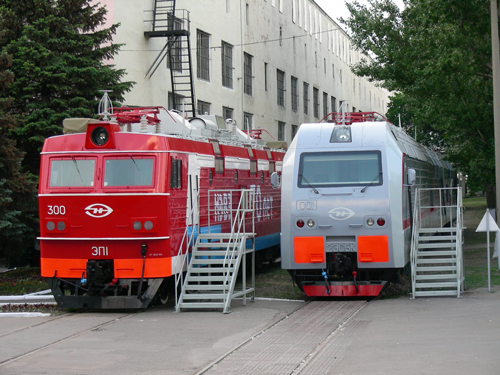
EP1-300 electric locomotive (left) and 2ES5K-001 (right) on the NEVZ area

The design of the electric locomotive took over a year under the guidance of VElNII. Considering the need to quickly develop a new series for mass production, the mechanical part of the future locomotives was based on the mechanical part of the VL80 locomotives, which was slightly modified. A new driver's cab was developed for the new locomotive, featuring a streamlined front and a modern control panel with a microprocessor control system based on the one used in the EP1 series locomotives. The electrical equipment for the new locomotives was largely standardized with that used on the VL85, but it was more energy-efficient. Designing the electric locomotive took more than a year, and at the beginning of 2004 the plant began building a prototype.

For the new family of AC electric locomotives with four-axle sections, according to the new system for assigning series names, the designation ES5K was chosen, which meant "sectional electric locomotive of the 5th series with commutator motors". (Note: Single freight locomotives received the series designation E (electric locomotive) before the serial number of the series, passenger ones got EP (passenger electric locomotive), and multi-unit ones got ES (sectional electric locomotive).) Series number 5 was chosen due to series numbers 2 and 3 were reserved for prospective six-axle DC and AC electric locomotives EP2/EP3 for passenger service and E2/E3 for freight service, while E4/E5 were allocated for four-axle electric locomotives. The locomotive also received a prefix to the main series designation indicating the number of sections, so the two-section version was named 2ES5K. Since the locomotives were produced in the capital of the Don Cossacks and were primarily planned to be delivered to Siberia, the series was named "Ermak" after the famous Cossack ataman who conquered Siberia, by analogy with the series name "Donchak" for similar DC electric locomotives 2ES4K.

=== Issue ===
The first two 2ES5K electric locomotives were built at the end of 2004 and 2005, and then mass production started in 2006. In 2006, two booster sections were also created to form three-unit electric locomotives, which began serial production in 2007, the same year a single-unit double cab locomotive E5K was also created. In 2014, booster sections with compartments began to be produced to form four-unit locomotives. As of December 2025, a total of 32 E5K locomotives, 789 2ES5K locomotives, 1,648 3ES5K locomotives, 85 4ES5K locomotives, and 18 2EL5 locomotives have been produced, that is 32 double cab E5K locomotives, 5,044 single cab leading sections of ES5K, 36 single cab leading sections of EL5, 1,818 intermediate sections of ES5K, 85 of which are equipped with compartments instead of toilets. Additionally, 5 2ES5S locomotives and 2 3ES5S locomotives were produced, which includes 14 single cab leading sections of ES5S and 2 intermediate sections of ES5S.

Locomotive production figures by year
Build date	Locomotive model	Number of locomotives	Number of units			Locomotive fleet numbers
Build date	Locomotive model	Number of locomotives	Double cab	Single cab	Intermediate	Locomotive fleet numbers
2004	2ES5K	1	–	2	–	001
2005	2ES5K	1	–	2	–	002
2005	2EL5	1	–	2	–	001
2006	2ES5K	41	–	82	–	003–043
2006	3ES5K	–	–	–	2	–
2006	2EL5	1	–	2	–	002
2007	E5K	10	10	–	–	001–010
2007	2ES5K	20	–	40	–	044, ~~045~~ (Note: The 2ES5K-045 locomotive was upgraded with a third section and redesignated to 3ES5K-001. In which the number 045 ceased to exist.), 046–064
2007	3ES5K	22	–	44	20	001–022
2007	2EL5	1	–	2	–	003
2008	E5K	14	14	–	–	011–024
2008	2ES5K	67	–	134	–	065–131
2008	3ES5K	24	–	48	24	023–046
2008	2EL5	9	–	18	–	004–012
2009	E5K	8	8	–	–	025–032
2009	2ES5K	17	–	34	–	132–148
2009	3ES5K	51	–	102	51	047–097
2009	2EL5	1	–	2	–	013
2010	2ES5K	11	–	10	–	149–153
2010	3ES5K	88	–	148	74	098–171
2010	2EL5	2	–	6	–	014–016
2011	2ES5K	11	–	22	–	154–164
2011	3ES5K	88	–	176	88	172–259
2011	2EL5	2	–	4	–	017, 018
2012	3ES5K	107	–	214	107	260–356, 701–710
2013	2ES5K	41	–	82	–	165–205
2013	3ES5K	128	–	256	128	357–484
2014	2ES5K	17	–	34	–	206–222
2014	3ES5K	155	–	310	155	485–594, 605–650
2014	4ES5K	3	–	6	6	001–003
2015	3ES5K	113	–	226	113	595–604, 651–700, 711–743
2016	2ES5K	22	–	–	–	223–244
2016	3ES5K	70	–	140	70	744–813
2017	2ES5K	49	–	98	–	245–293
2017	3ES5K	45	–	90	45	814–858
2017	4ES5K	5	–	10	10	004–008
2018	2ES5K	121	–	242	–	294–414
2018	3ES5K	46	–	92	46	859–904
2018	4ES5K	10	–	20	20	009–018
2018	2ES5S	1	–	2	–	001
2018	3ES5S	1	–	2	1	001
2019	2ES5K	84	–	168	–	415–498
2019	3ES5K	96	–	192	96	905–1000
2019	4ES5K	4	–	8	8	019–022
2020	2ES5K	15	–	30	–	499–513
2020	3ES5K	137	–	274	137	1001–1137
2020	4ES5K	15	–	30	30	023–037
2021	2ES5K	11	–	22	–	514–524
2021	3ES5K	144	–	288	144	1138–1281
2021	4ES5K	5	–	10	10	038–042
2022	2ES5K	28	–	56	–	525–554
2022	3ES5K	130	–	260	130	1282–1411
2022	4ES5K	6	–	12	12	042–048
2022	3ES5S	1	–	2	1	002
2023	2ES5K	35	–	70	–	555–590
2023	3ES5K	113	–	226	113	1412–1524
2023	4ES5K	19	–	38	38	049–067
2023	2ES5S	4	–	8	–	002–005
2024	2ES5K	108	–	216	–	591–698
2024	3ES5K	69	–	136	69	1525–1593
2024	4ES5K	15	–	30	30	068–082
2025	2ES5K	92	–	184	–	699–790
2025	3ES5K	55	–	110	55	1594–1643, 1647–1651
2025	4ES5K	3	–	6	6	083–085
Total	E5K	32	32	–	–	001–032
Total	2ES5K	789	–	1578	–	001–044, ~~045~~, 046–780
Total	3ES5K	1648	–	3296	1648	001–1643, 1647–1651
Total	4ES5K	85	–	170	170	001–085
Total	2EL5	18	–	36	–	001–018
Total	2ES5S	5	–	10	–	001–005
Total	3ES5S	2	–	4	2	001, 002

=== Modifications ===
==== E5K ====
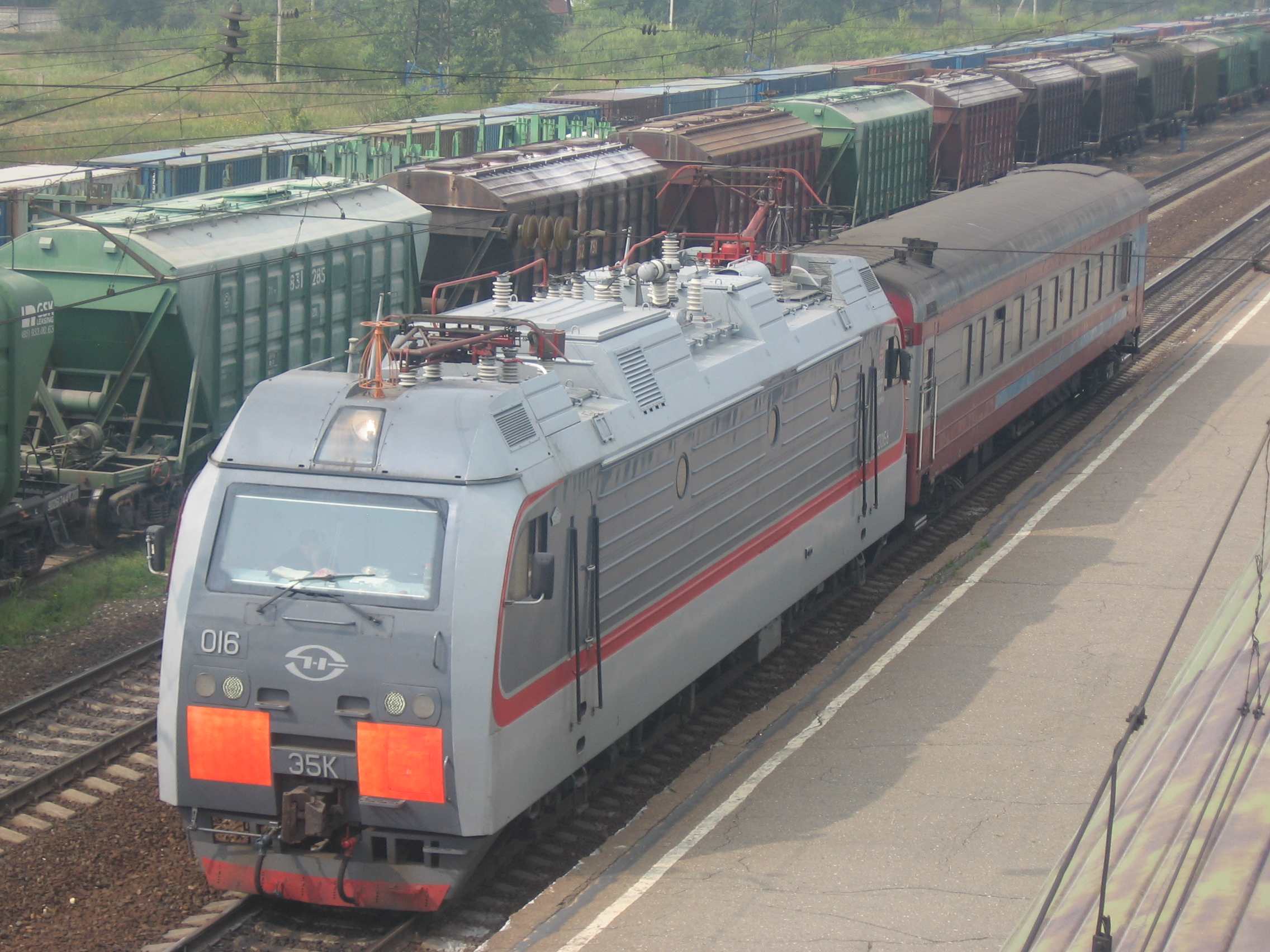
E5K-16 with a track geometry car

The single unit version of the locomotive, E5K, is designed for freight and light mainline service. The locomotive is also used for running mixed freight and suburban passenger trains on routes where using a separate locomotive series (electric locomotives) isn’t practical, and train speeds are low, while the power of a six-axle passenger electric locomotive would be excessive.

In terms of design, the locomotive is largely similar to the 2ES5K, but it has a second driver's cab with a vestibule instead of an inter-car gangway while keeping the same engine compartment length. Due to this, the locomotive is 1.8 meters longer and 4 tons heavier than a 2ES5K unit. The electric locomotive also has two pantographs compared to the 2ES5K.

The first locomotive of this series was built in 2007, which is later than the 2ES5K. A total of 32 electric locomotives were built. The locomotive became one of the few four-axle NEVZ AC locomotives originally released as a single- unit, double cab locomotive, (Note: Examples of four-axle, double cab locomotives built in the USSR include the experimental VL40 electric locomotives and the exported Sr1 electric locomotives) rather than being upgraded from sections of mass-produced two-unit freight locomotives. (Note: Other single unit four-axle electric locomotives, derived from two-unit ones: VL10-1 (VL10P-1) — units of VL10 DC electric locomotives, converted into double cab four-axle electric locomotives; VL40U, VL40M, VL40S (VL80-1) — units of AC electric locomotives VL80T or VL80S, converted into double cab four-axle electric locomotives; 4E10 — double cab, four-axle DC electric locomotive, based on the VL10 and VL11.)

==== 2ES5K ====
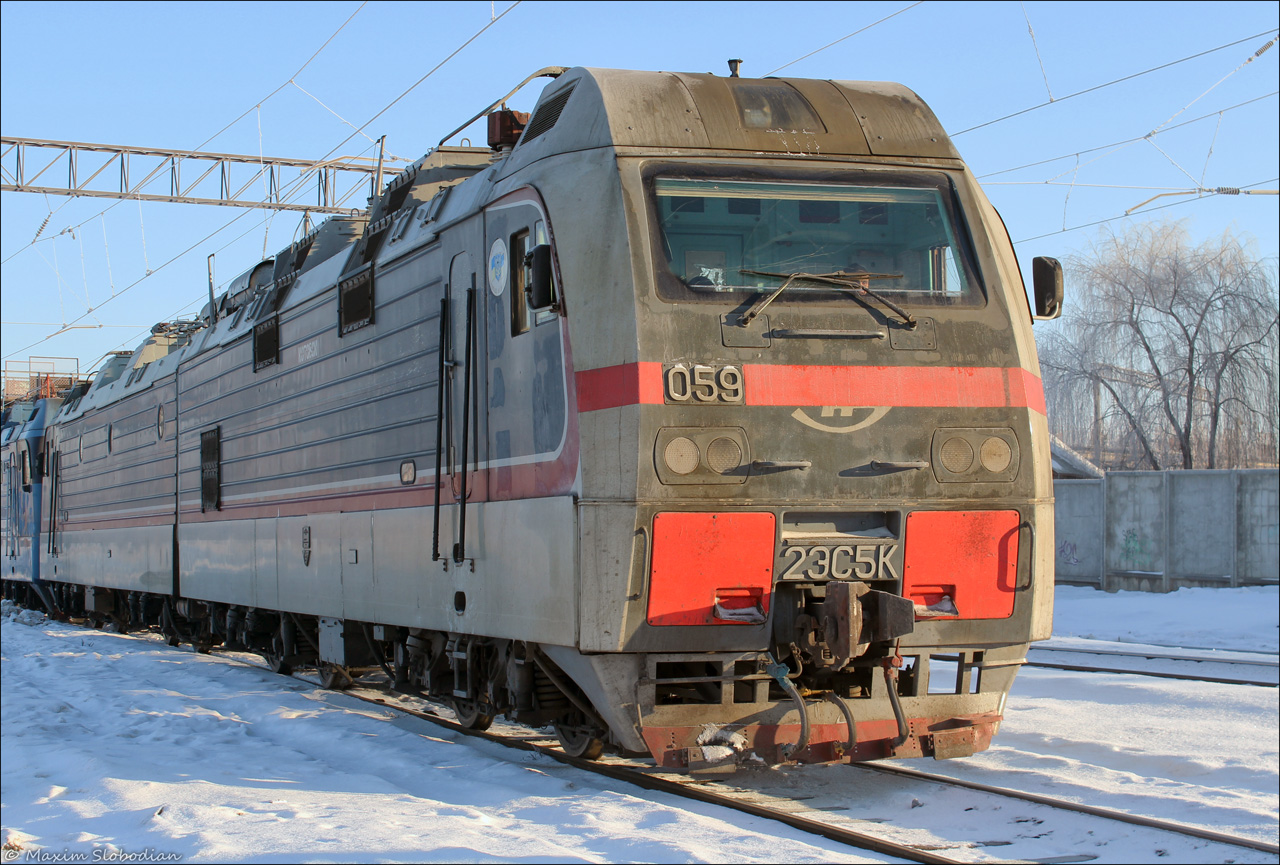
2ES5K-059

The 2ES5K electric locomotive is the basic and historically first model of the "Ermak" family. The "S" in the designation comes from the word "sectional" which indicates the locomotive can operate in a multiple-unit control, while the number 2 refers to the number of units. The locomotive is made up of two identical units, each with a driver's cab on the front end and an inter-car gangway on the rear. The units differ only in that one of them has a small restroom. The locomotive weighs 192 t (423,000 lb) and is 35,004 millimetres (114 ft 10.1 in) long over the couplers.

In terms of its characteristics, the electric locomotive is comparable to the standard two-unit VL80S electric locomotive and is designed for hauling standard freight trains on flat sections and shorter distances on mountainous sections. It can also be used for hauling passenger trains on mountainous routes where a six-axle passenger electric locomotive might not provide enough traction and power. For hauling heavy and extra-heavy trains, two locomotives can be operated together under a multiple-unit control.

The first 2ES5K electric locomotive was built at the end of 2004, the second at the end of 2005, by the end of which assembly of locomotive numbered 003 had started and their mass production was organized. As of February 2022, 529 locomotives had been produced. Over time, locomotive 2ES5K-045 was upgraded with a booster unit to become a 3ES5K locomotive and was redesignated, in which the number 045 ceased to exist as a 2ES5K.

==== 2EL5 ====
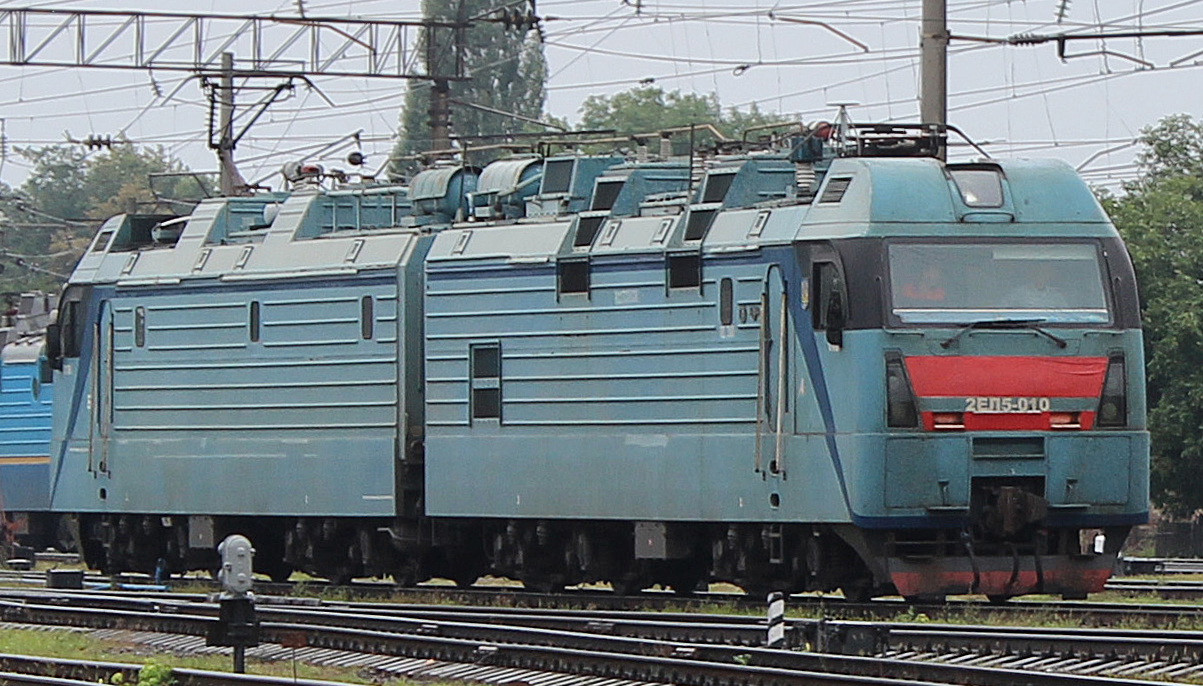
2EL5-010

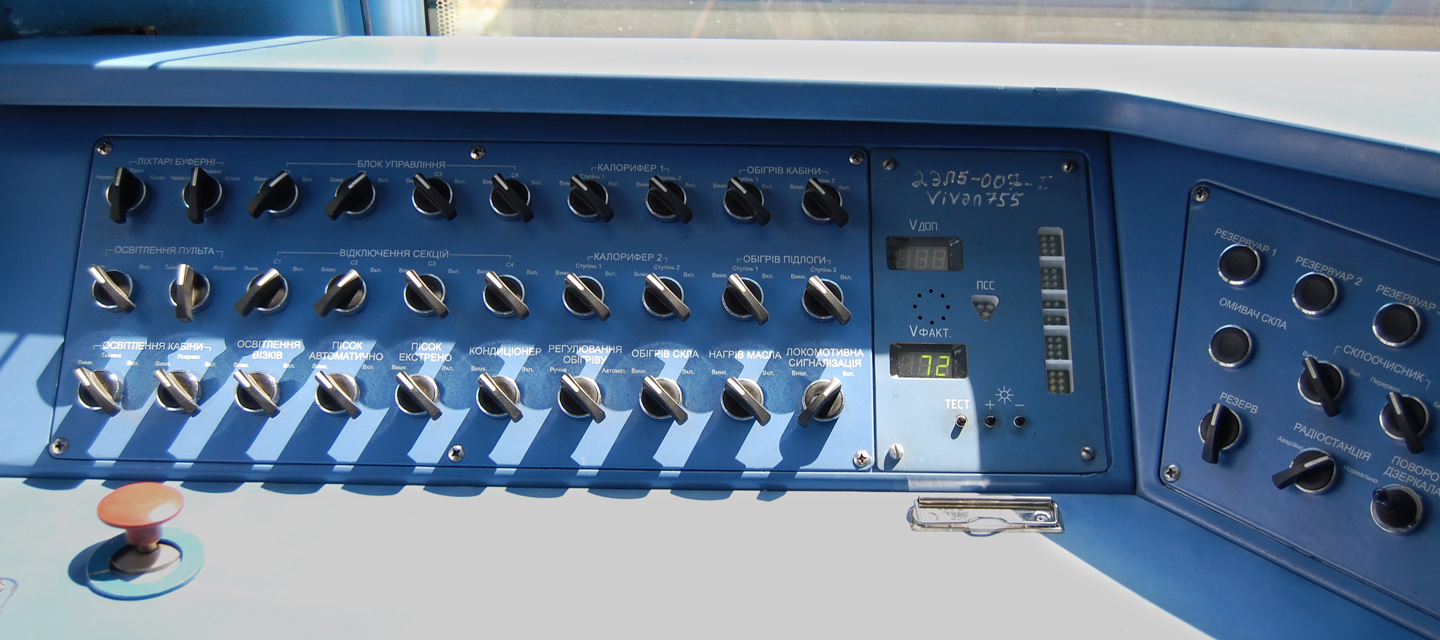
2EL5 panel with Ukrainian markings and ALS-MU

From 2005 to 2011, the holding company "Luhanskteplovoz" produced 2EL5 series electric locomotives, the design of which is a copy of the 2ES5K electric locomotive produced by NEVZ. A distinctive feature of the 2EL5 locomotive is the modified driver's cab with slanted buffer lights in an elongated trapezoidal shape that are combined into a single headlight block, the placement and shape of the windows on the side walls (rectangular windows are used instead of round ones), and a slightly different control panel. The 2EL5 locomotive was equipped with Ukrainian safety devices — ALS-MU. The 2EL5-001 locomotive was assembled at NEVZ together with specialists from HK "Luhanskteplovoz", while the second unit was assembled at "Luhanskteplovoz" from Russian components and parts under the supervision of NEVZ representatives. Locomotives numbered 003 and 004 were made entirely at the Luhansk plant, except for the bogies. Luhansk-made bogies were installed starting with locomotive numbered 008. A total of 18 locomotives were built.

==== 3ES5K ====
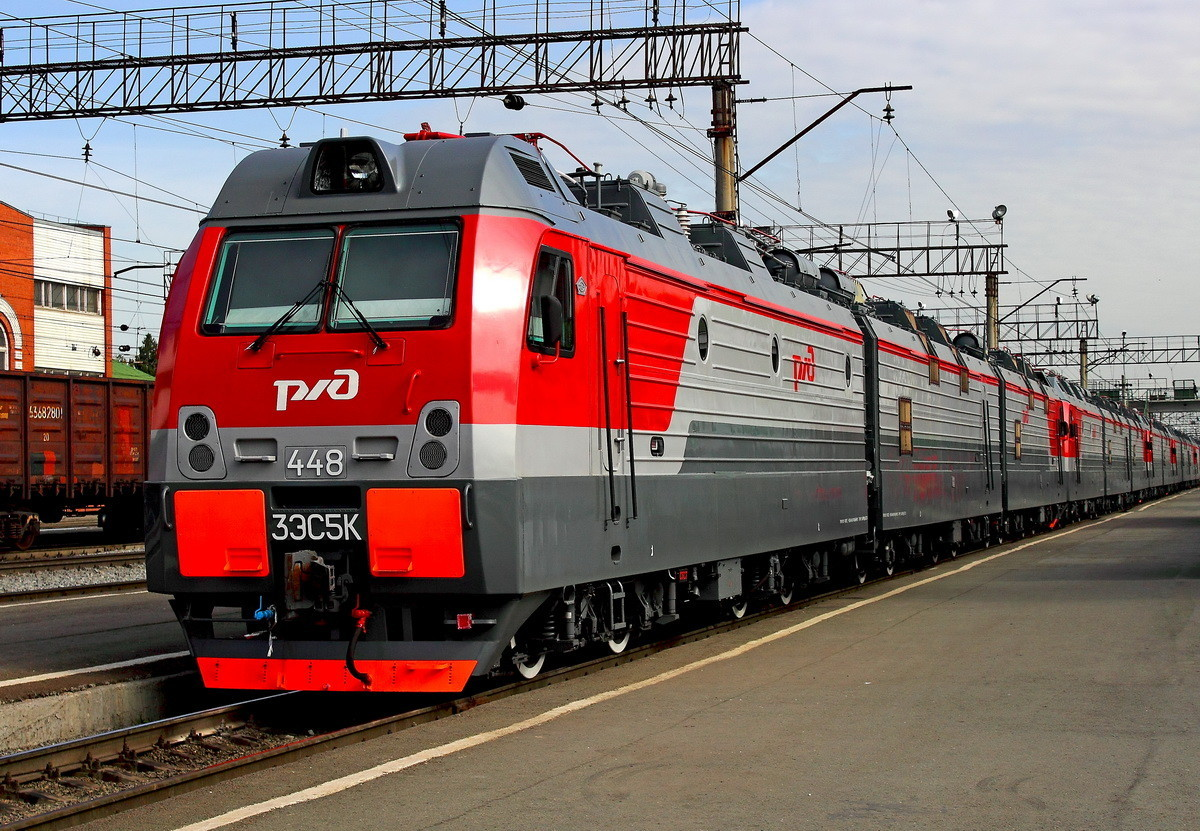
3ES5K-448

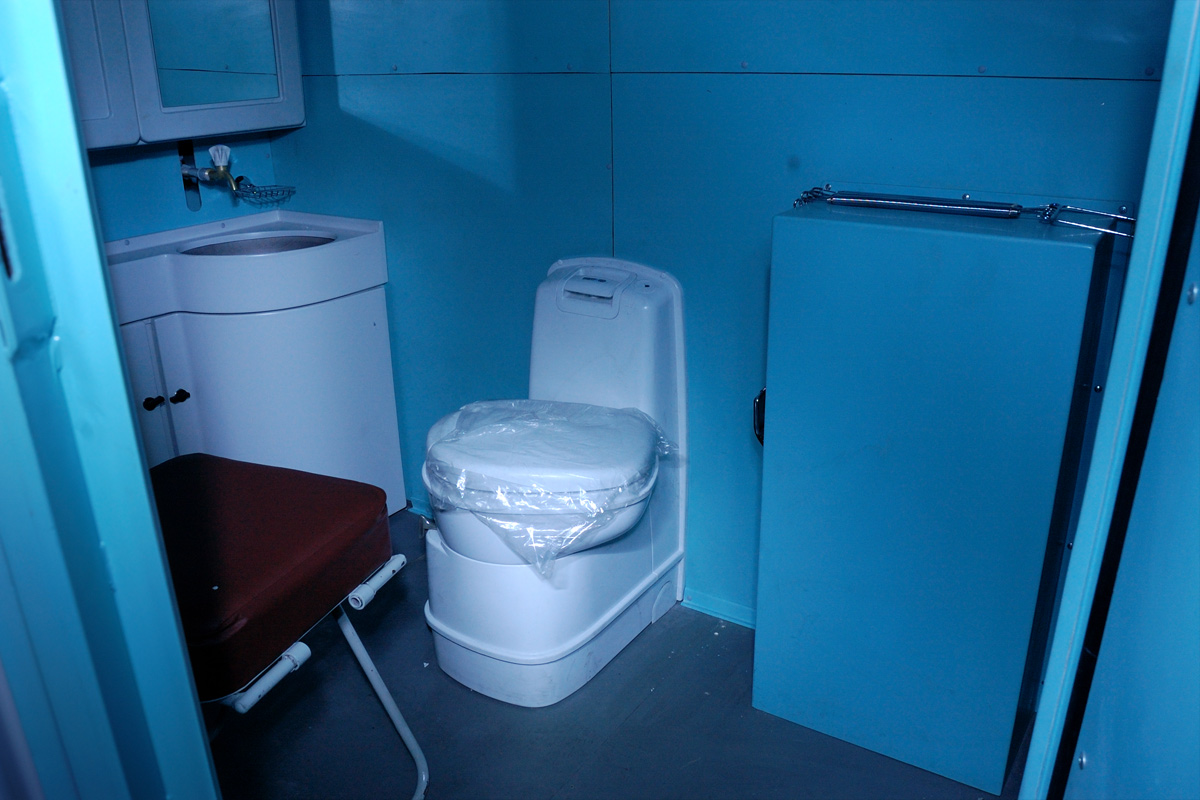
Restroom in the 3ES5K booster unit

The locomotive consists of two leading units and one intermediate booster unit without control cabs but with a gangway. This setup allows the standard 2ES5K locomotive to increase its power by one and a half times, making it suitable for hauling heavy freight trains or operating on routes with significant gradients. The booster unit is technically no different from a regular unit, except in which instead of a control cab, it has a second end wall with an inter-car gangway. This makes working with it more convenient compared to VL80^{S} and VL80^{R} locomotives, which operate in three-unit setups with three leading units, allowing the crew to move between all units while running. This way, they can inspect all the equipment and spot any potential issues without having to stop the train. In the intermediate unit, where the cab would normally be in a standard 2ES5K locomotive, there’s a spacious restroom. The booster unit has the same length and weight as a leading unit.

The first two prototype intermediate units were produced by the Novocherkassk plant in 2006 and were temporarily included in the locomotives 2ES5K-001 and 011 for testing. Next in 2007, one of them was permanently included in a new locomotive, 2ES5K-045, which had its class designation changed to 2ES5KB (B for booster unit) and assigned the number 001, making the number 045 to disappear from the 2ES5K series and remain unused. After that, serial production of three-unit locomotives began, and starting with 2ES5KB-002, which included another previously produced booster unit, the locomotives were originally built as three-unit. After the first 13 locomotives were built, the series was redesignated 3ES5K, and all earlier 2ES5KB units were also redesignated 3ES5K. The 3ES5K locomotive series became the most mass-produced in the "Ermak" family, surpassing the 2ES5K series by several times — as of August 2020, 1,074 units had been built.

In 2013, an experimental 3ES5K-434 locomotive was built on order from Russian Railways, which had a number of technical improvements compared to the standard models:

- The weight of each unit was increased from 96 to 98 tons to boost the locomotive's adhesive weight and make traction modes more efficient.
- a more modern microprocessor control system MSUD-015 was installed;
- new rectifier-inverter converters with an axle-by-axle traction control function were applied, allowing the locomotive to start and accelerate or brake more smoothly, and in some cases, to do without adding sand;
- Alongside the series mode, an independent excitation mode of the traction motors appeared, allowing for improved locomotive performance when slipping.

The locomotive was later temporarily tested as a four-unit locomotive together with the booster unit from the new 4ES5K-001 locomotive, which was completed later.

In 2018, the locomotive 3ES5K-879 was released, equipped with improved thyristor converters compared to the standard models.

At the beginning of 2021, the 3ES5K-1147 was built and sent for testing, equipped with new gear — a locomotive friction activation device (LFAD) and a wheelset flange lubrication device (WFLD). These upgrades allow locomotives to travel longer distances between sand refills (LFAD improves the locomotive's traction, effectively eliminating or reducing the need for sand). Using the WFLD helps reduce wear on wheel flanges (increasing the lifespan of locomotive wheelsets) and lowers resistance on curves, while also making it possible to reduce the number of stations needed to refill sand for locomotives.

==== 4ES5K ====
4ES5K-003 on the VNIIZhT ring in Shcherbinka

The locomotive consists of two leading and two intermediate booster units and is used for hauling very heavy long freight trains on flat terrain or heavy trains in mountainous areas on units with a complex profile, where the power of the 3ES5K is not enough, replacing a system of two two-unit locomotives. Using two booster units instead of two leading units improves the working conditions for the locomotive crew by allowing them to move through all units while the train is in motion and reduces the overall cost of the locomotives due to the absence of unnecessary cabs. By increasing the number of units to four, the locomotive achieved an hourly power of 13,120 kW (with continuous power of 12,240 kW), matching the system of two 2ES5K locomotives. Before the introduction of the six-unit Chinese Shen-24 electric locomotive in 2020, it held the title of the largest and most powerful electric locomotive in the world. Almost at the same time as the 4ES5K in Russia, there was a combination created of the 2ES10 locomotive with an additional (third) 2ES10S unit (the total continuous power of the units — 12,600 kW — exceeds that of the 4ES5K), but this combination is not considered a single unit. In terms of specific power and section power, the 4ES5K also falls far behind many electric locomotives with asynchronous traction drives, only gaining an advantage by having more sections.

A feature of the locomotive compared to the serial 2ES5K and 3ES5K models is the increased weight of each unit up to 98 tons, the use of an advanced microprocessor control system, and rectifier-inverter converters, the same as on the experimental 3ES5K-434 locomotive. Adittionaly, while one of the booster units still has a spacious restroom instead of a cab, the other unit has a compartment with two sleeping bunks for the shift crew or accompanying personnel and features a side window. Starting from number 004, on all units of the 4ES5K locomotives, busbar wiring is used instead of power cable installation, and in the second booster unit with the compartment, the motor-compressor unit and main roof reservoirs are also absent.

Originally, in July 2014, only the booster unit of the ES5K with a cab for locomotive crew rest was built, with increased weight and improved equipment. Just like with the first unit of the 3ES5K, the first experimental unit was initially included in the previously released, smaller locomotive for testing. This was the experimental 3ES5K-434 locomotive built in 2013, which also had similar converters, independent traction motor excitation, and increased unit weight. After the tests, the unit was uncoupled from the locomotive, and two more leading units plus one booster unit with a restroom were added, after which the completed locomotive was designated 4ES5K-001. A total of three locomotives of the series were produced by the end of 2014. In 2017, series production resumed, and by the end of 2018, another 15 locomotives had been built.

==== 2ES5S "Ataman" ====
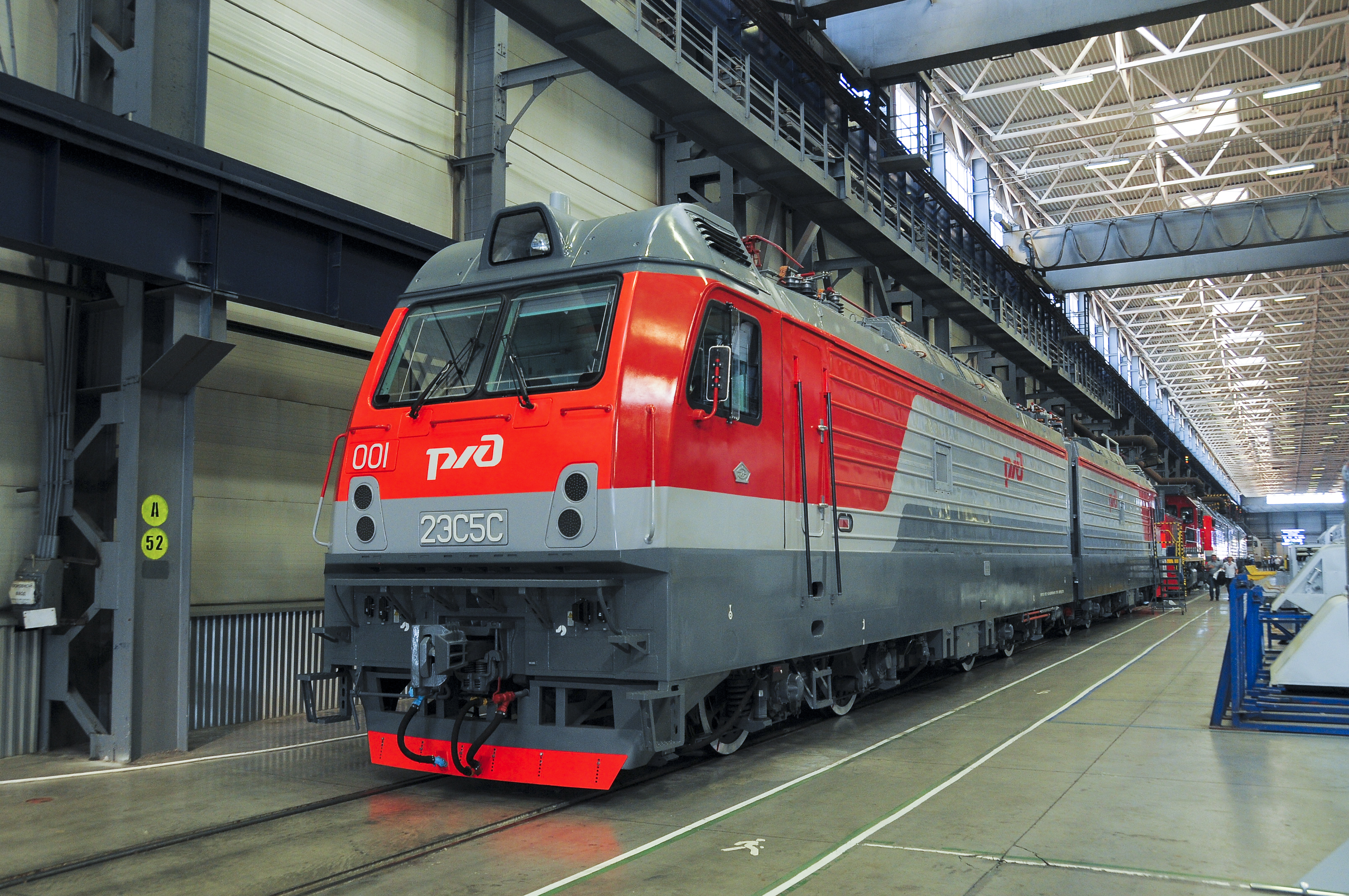
2ES5S-001 at the Bryansk Machine-Building Plant

The 2ES5S locomotive was designed based on the 2ES5K and is distinguished by using more powerful asynchronous traction motors instead of traditional collector ones, as well as the corresponding traction converters. Initially, the 2ES5S project was being developed from 2015 based on the 2ES5 "Skif" locomotives, which despite having a similar design to ES5K locomotives, have a fundamentally different body design, developed in collaboration with the French company Alstom. The 2ES5S electric locomotive, in its original version, was a new member of the "Skif" lineup and was supposed to have a similar mechanical design, only differing from 2ES5 in the use of domestic converter and traction electrical equipment instead of the more expensive imported equipment while maintaining all technical specifications.

However, later on, to cut production costs, the project was radically changed, and instead of the more modern "Skif" locomotive, the body of the "Ermak" electric locomotive was used as the basis for the design, with a number of minor modifications, such as a slightly recessed front and no side windows in the machine compartment. The locomotive uses traction motors, a traction converter, a traction transformer, an auxiliary drive, compressor equipment, and control system equipment made in Russia. The cab interior and the control panel countertop of the 2ES5S locomotive are similar to the control panel of the 2ES5K locomotives, but the controls themselves are more similar in design and layout to the 2ES5 locomotive.

At the end of 2017, the Novocherkassk plant built the first locomotive of the series under the (new) design, numbered 001, which stayed at the plant during the first half of 2018 for adjustments. In June the same year, the locomotive left the plant and was sent to a private presentation at the Bryansk Machine-Building Plant.

As of early 2019, the locomotive was undergoing tests on the experimental track of JSC 'VNIIZhT' (EK VNIIZhT, in the Shcherbinka urban district).

In September 2019, at the same time as the three-unit version (3ES5C), the locomotive completed its testing cycle.

Operational tests with freight trains weighing 7,100 t (15,700,000 lb) were carried out on the Artyshta-II — Altayskaya section of the West Siberian Railway. During the tests, they checked the energy-efficient operation mode of the train by switching off some traction motors when the locomotive had excess power and studied algorithms for choosing the optimal mode. The operational tests were completed in early December 2019. In March 2020, certificates of compliance with the technical regulations of the Customs Union were issued for the 2ES5S and 3ES5S locomotives.

In autumn 2020, a vote was held at NEVZ to choose a name for its locomotives with asynchronous drives. A total of 123 NEVZ employees participated in the vote, selecting from 184 suggested options. As a result of the vote, the 2ES5S locomotive and its three-section version, the 3ES5S, received a state certificate for the trademark "Ataman".

==== 3ES5S "Ataman" ====
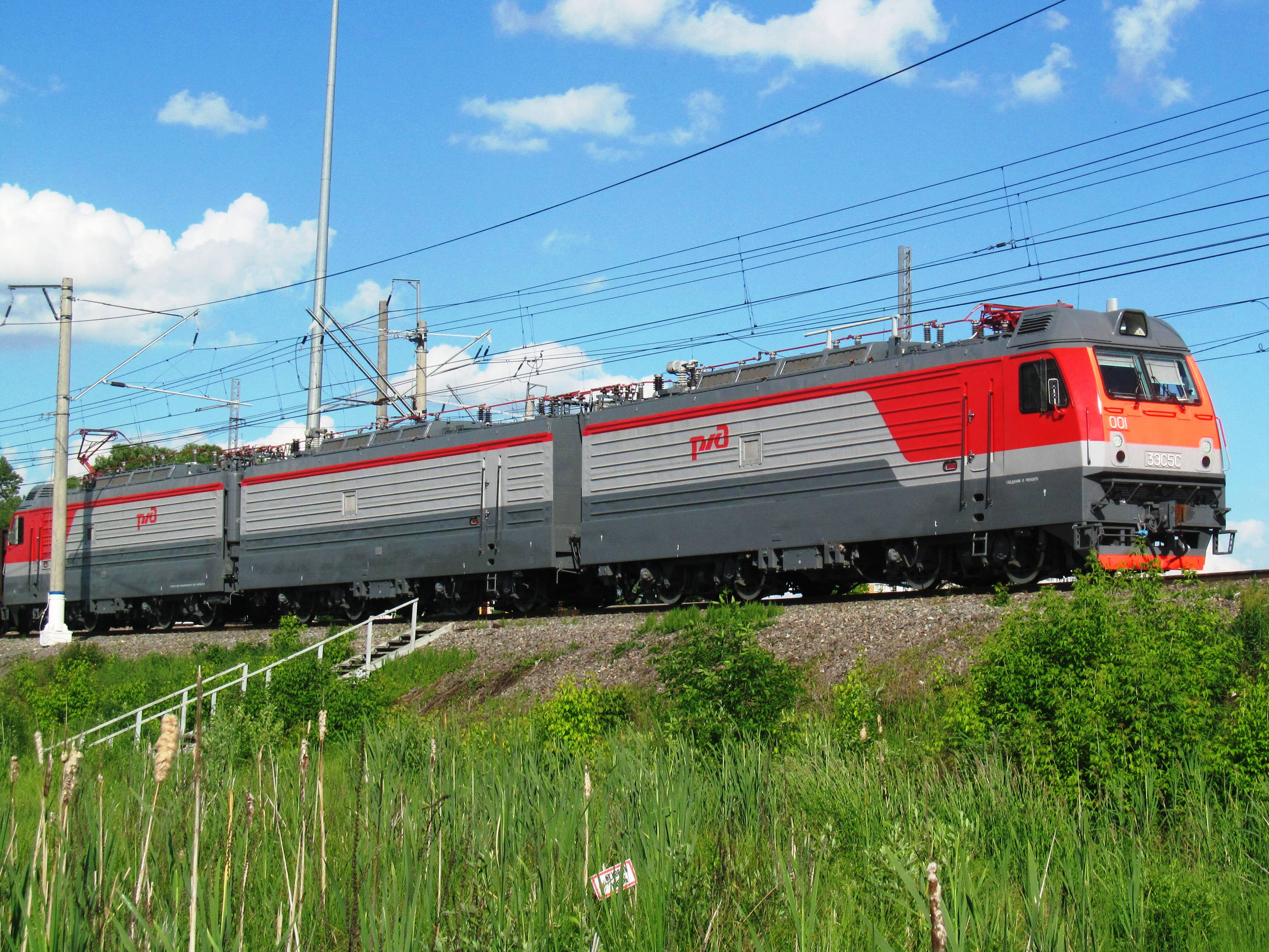
3ES5S-001 (prototype) at the VNIIZhT EK

The three-unit version of the 2ES5S locomotive (an additional middle booster unit was added, designed to handle trains with a set mass of 7,100 t (15,700,000 lb) or more). Just like the two-unit version, it carries the trademark “Ataman”. The maximum speed is 120 km/h (75 mph). In May 2019, a prototype of the 3ES5S was sent to the EC of VNIIZhT in Shcherbinka for a test run of about 5,000 km (3,100 mi) and certification trials. During the tests, it was planned to check traction and energy performance, climate control, and electromagnetic compatibility. In June the same year, the test run was completed successfully. The run was conducted at speeds from 0 to 120 km/h (0 to 75 mph) with a load of a train weighing 5,400 t (11,900,000 lb). Two months later in August, new tests began at the high-speed test track of the Belorechenskaya depot on the North Caucasus Railway. The dynamic-strength tests are conducted to determine the loads transmitted to the railway tracks from the locomotive, as well as the allowable speeds when going around curves of different radius.

In September 2019, at the same time as the two-unit version, the 3ES5S completed its testing cycle, and in March 2020, certificates of compliance with the technical regulations of the Customs Union for the 2ES5S and 3ES5S locomotives were issued.

About two months before receiving the certificate, the controlled operation of the 3ES5S was successfully completed. The energy-efficient train operation mode was being tested; in this mode, savings are achieved by turning off some of the traction motors when there is excess power. For the tests, lines with fairly complex profiles were chosen (sections Likaya — Novorossiysk — Likaya and Krymskaya — Grushevaya). Nine trial runs were made to determine the technology for handling freight trains weighing 7,100 t (15,700,000 lb).

== General characteristics ==
The E5K/ES5K "Ermak" family of electric locomotives are designed to haul freight, passenger, and empty trains on Russian gauge railways, electrified with single-phase AC at a nominal voltage of 25 kV and a frequency of 50 Hz. The locomotive is designed to operate at a contact line voltage from 19 to 29 kV and an outside air temperature from −50 to +50 °C (maximum working value), and at altitudes up to 1,200 m (3,900 ft) above sea level. The electrical equipment installed in the locomotive body is designed to operate at temperatures from −50 to +60 °C.

The E5K/ES5K family of electric locomotives is basically the next evolutionary step in the development of the VL80 family of electric locomotives with a 2_{0}-2_{0} (Bo'Bo') axle formula per section and is positioned as their main replacement. The ES5K is similar to the VL80 in design, size, and equipment layout, but it differs with more modern electrical equipment, much of it inherited from the VL85 locomotives, a new streamlined front end, a modern driver’s cab, and a microprocessor control system. Also while all VL80 locomotives were produced only as single cab unit, some of which were later modernized into booster units or double cab single unit locomotives, the ES5K was originally produced at the factory as both single E5K locomotives and booster unit.

The ES5K locomotives have a design counterpart for 3 kV DC lines — the ES4K '"Donchak" locomotive, which is standardized in terms of mechanical parts, driver's cab, pneumatic, and braking equipment, and comes in two (2ES4K) and three (3ES4K) unit versions. A single double cab ES4K locomotive isn’t produced due to low demand on DC lines, although its creation is technically possible. In terms of power, an ES4K unit is slightly weaker than an ES5K unit (3200 kW and 3280 kW in hourly mode), but its mechanical design is identical, except for the gearbox ratio. Unlike the ES5K, the ES4K can use not only regenerative braking but also rheostatic braking. Although the ES4K electric locomotive does not have the heavy electrical equipment for converting AC to DC like the ES5K, it has starting and braking resistors instead, which makes the weight of an ES4K section the same as that of the ES5K — 9 t (20,000 lb).

=== Compositeness ===
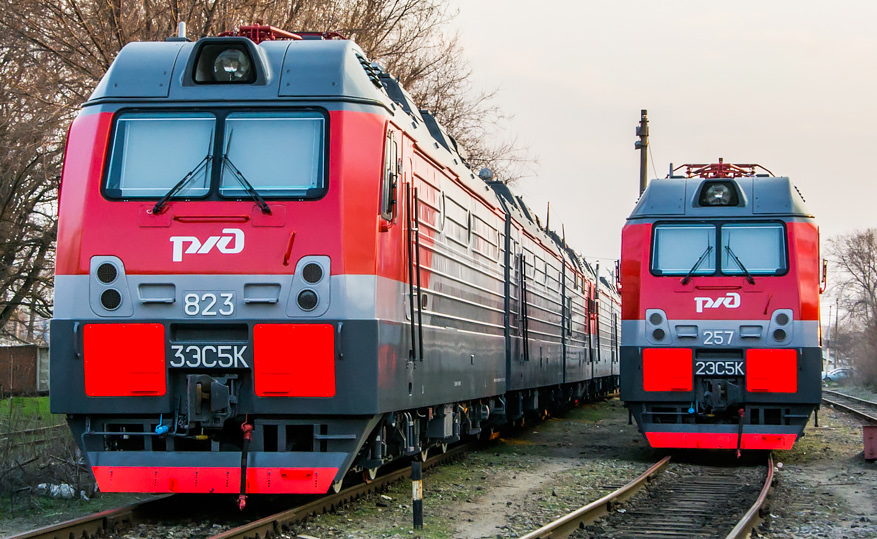
3ES5K-823 and 2ES5K-257 locomotives

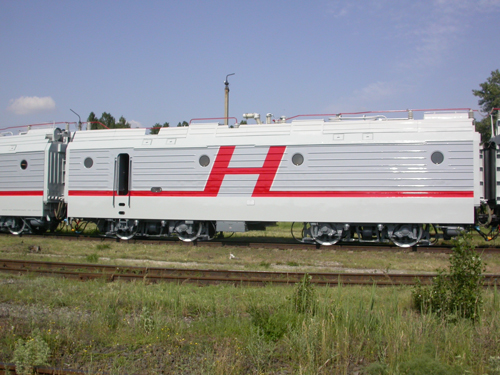
Booster unit in the 3ES5K locomotive

The E5K locomotives are single, double cab locomotives, while the ES5K models are made up of several units: the 2ES5K has two leading units, the 3ES5K has two leading units and one intermediate booster between them, and the 4ES5K has two leading units and two intermediate boosters between them. The leading units of the ES5K have a single driver's cab on one side and an inter-car gangway on the other, while the boosters have two inter-car gangways at both ends. Since the ES5K units contain the full set of equipment, they can also operate as single locomotives. However, unlike the double cab E5K locomotives, their operation in this mode is limited due to poor visibility for the driver when heading backwards and the need to turn around at terminal stations.

Two two-unit 2ES5K locomotives can be coupled together using the multiple-unit system, controlled from a single cab; it is also possible to couple the front unit of one locomotive backward to a two-unit locomotive to form a three-unit consist. At the same time, in the case of coupling booster units between the front units (for 3ES5K and 4ES5K), operation in the multiple-unit system from a single cab is not provided, but two locomotives can still work together. However, the units of 3ES5K and 4ES5K locomotives are standardized with 2ES5K and have sockets on the front, which allows them to be operated in a multiple-unit system if the booster unit is uncoupled.

The following composition options are possible:

- Single locomotive ES5K;
- Single ES5K unit;
- Two-unit locomotive 2ES5K (two leading units coupled tail-to-tail);
- Two two-unit locomotives 2ES5K+2ES5K (locomotives coupled head-to-head);
- Three leading units ES5K+2ES5K (the third leading unit coupled tail-to-head with the 2ES5K);
- Three-unit locomotive 3ES5K (two leading units ES5K and one booster in between);
- Four-unit electric locomotive 4ES5K (two leading units ES5K and two boosters in between).

=== Numbering and labeling ===
Locomotives of the E5K/ES5K family of all series received three-digit numbers in ascending order according to the sequence of their production, starting from 001. Each series of locomotives has its own separate numbering.

The markings indicating the series and number of the locomotive are placed on the front in the form of raised metal letters. For early-model locomotives with horizontal buffer lights, the markings were applied similarly to VL85 locomotives: the series is placed in the center above the coupler, and the three-digit number is above the right buffer headlight under the windshield. For the vast majority of locomotives with slanted buffer headlights, the number is placed in the center above the series marking, at the level between the lower buffer lights. On some locomotives with slanted headlights, like the 3ES5K-340 and nearby numbers, the series was indicated just under the windshield above the logo in the center, and the number was above the right buffer headlight. In the center of the cab, slightly below the windshield, many early-model locomotives had the Novocherkassk Plant logo, which looked like a slanted 'H' inside an oval, while later-model locomotives had the operator's logo (for Russian Railways, the logo is styled as 'p/d').

On many locomotives, the series number or fleet number is also painted on the front sections on the side with white paint under the right-hand side window of the driver's cab. On early models, usually only the fleet number was indicated, positioned in the middle between the bottom of the window and the bottom of the body, while on later models, the series number is shown directly under the window, and the fleet number below that. In the space between the driver's cab window and the entrance door on the right side, some locomotives also have the assigned depot marked.

=== Technical specifications ===
The main technical specifications of the E5K and ES5K family locomotives:

Parameter		Locomotive model			
Parameter		E5K	2ES5K	3ES5K	4ES5K
Axial formula		2_{0}–2_{0}	2×(2_{0}–2_{0})	3×(2_{0}–2_{0})	4×(2_{0}–2_{0})
Size
Overall size		1-T			
Length in milimeters	along the coupler axles	19 302	2×17 502 (35 004)	3×17 502 (52 506)	4×17 502 (70 008)
Length in milimeters	on the body	18 555	16 755		
Length in milimeters	on the frame	18 050	16 250		
Width in milimeters	along the top of the side walls	3140			
Width in milimeters	on the frame	3200			
Width in milimeters	on the mirrors	3550–3565			
Height from the track in milimeters	roof equipment	5205			
Height from the track in milimeters	lowered pantograph	5050			
Height from the track in milimeters	raised pantograph	5500–7000			
Height from the track in milimeters	floor	1750			
Height from the track in milimeters	automatic coupling axles	1060±20			
Chassis dimensions in milimeters	wheelbase	10 300	8500		
Chassis dimensions in milimeters	bogie wheelbase	2900			
Chassis dimensions in milimeters	wheel diameter	1250–1160			
Chassis dimensions in milimeters	Track gauge	1520			
Chassis dimensions in milimeters	minimum radius of curves	125×10³ (Note: At speeds of up to 10 km/h (6.2 mph))			
Weight
Working weight in tons		100±2	192±4	288±6	392±8
Axle load in tons		25±0,5	24±0,5	24±0,5	24,5±0,5
Maximum load difference between the wheels of an axle in kilonewtons (tons for force)		4,9 (0,5)			
Sand supply in liters		600	1200	1800	2400
Traction and power characteristics
Voltage and type of current in the contact network	rated voltage in kilovolts	25			
Voltage and type of current in the contact network	allowable voltage in kilovolts	19–29			
Voltage and type of current in the contact network	Type and frequency of current in Hz	single-phase AC, 50			
Gear ratio		88:21			
Power at the shafts of the traction motors in kilowatts	daily routine	3280 (4×820)	6560 (8×820)	9840 (12×820)	13 120 (16×820)
Power at the shafts of the traction motors in kilowatts	long-term mode	3060 (4×765)	6120 (8×765)	9180 (12×765)	12240 (16×765)
Thrust force in one-hour mode in kilonewtons (tons per force)	at 49.9 km/h (optimal speed)	232 (23.65)	464 (47.3)	696 (90.95)	928 (121.6)
Sustained thrust in kilonewtons (tons per force)	when accelerating	339 (34.6)	678 (69.1)	1017 (103.7)	1356 (138.3)
Sustained thrust in kilonewtons (tons per force)	at 10 km/h	292 (29.8)	584 (59.6)	877 (89.4)	1169 (119,2)
Sustained thrust in kilonewtons (tons per force)	at 20 km/h	275 (28.0)	549 (56.0)	823 (83.9)	1098 (112.0)
Sustained thrust in kilonewtons (tons per force)	at 30 km/h	263 (26.8)	526 (53.6)	789 (80.5)	1052 (107.3)
Sustained thrust in kilonewtons (tons per force)	at 40 km/h	254 (25.9)	508 (51.8)	762 (77.7)	1106 (103.6)
Sustained thrust in kilonewtons (tons per force)	at 50 km/h	230 (23.5)	460 (46.9)	690 (70.4)	920 (93.8)
Sustained thrust in kilonewtons (tons per force)	at 51 km/h (optimal speed)	211.5 (21.6)	423 (43.1)	634.5 (64.7)	826 (86.2)
Sustained thrust in kilonewtons (tons per force)	at 60 km/h	180 (18,4)	359 (36.7)	539 (55.0)	719 (73.3)
Sustained thrust in kilonewtons (tons per force)	at 70 km/h	154 (15.7)	308 (31.4)	462 (47.1)	616 (62.8)
Sustained thrust in kilonewtons (tons per force)	at 80 km/h	135 (13.8)	269 (27.4)	404 (41,2)	539 (55.0)
Sustained thrust in kilonewtons (tons per force)	at 90 km/h	120 (12.2)	239 (24.4)	359 (36.6)	479 (48.8)
Sustained thrust in kilonewtons (tons per force)	at 100 km/h	108 (11.0)	215 (21.9)	323 (32.9)	431 (43.9)
Sustained thrust in kilonewtons (tons per force)	at 110 km/h (top speed)	75 (7.6)	150 (15.3)	225 (22.9)	300 (30.6)
Speed in kilometers per hour	daily routine	49,9			
Speed in kilometers per hour	long-term mode	51			
Speed in kilometers per hour	design speed	110			
Brakeforce in kilonewtons (tons per second)	at a speed of 50 km/h	225 (22.95)	450 (45.9)	675 (68.85)	900 (89.8)
Brakeforce in kilonewtons (tons per second)	at a speed of 80 km/h	150 (15.3)	300 (30.6)	450 (45.9)	600 (61,2)
Brakeforce in kilonewtons (tons per second)	at a speed of 90 km/h	125 (12.75)	250 (49.5)	375 (38.25)	500 (99.0)
Efficiency in long-term mode		0,86	0,85	0,85	0,85
Long-term power factor		0,84	0,9	0,9	0,9

== Design ==
=== Mechanical part ===
The locomotive has a steel boxcab body with a main frame, on which a plastic block control cab and a set of equipment are installed.

The running gear is made with support-axle suspension for the traction motors with motor-axle sliding bearings. VL65 bogies are used; compared to the VL80 and VL85 bogies, it doesn’t have leaf springs, and compared to the VL80, it also doesn’t have kingpins, with the force transmitted through an inclined rod.

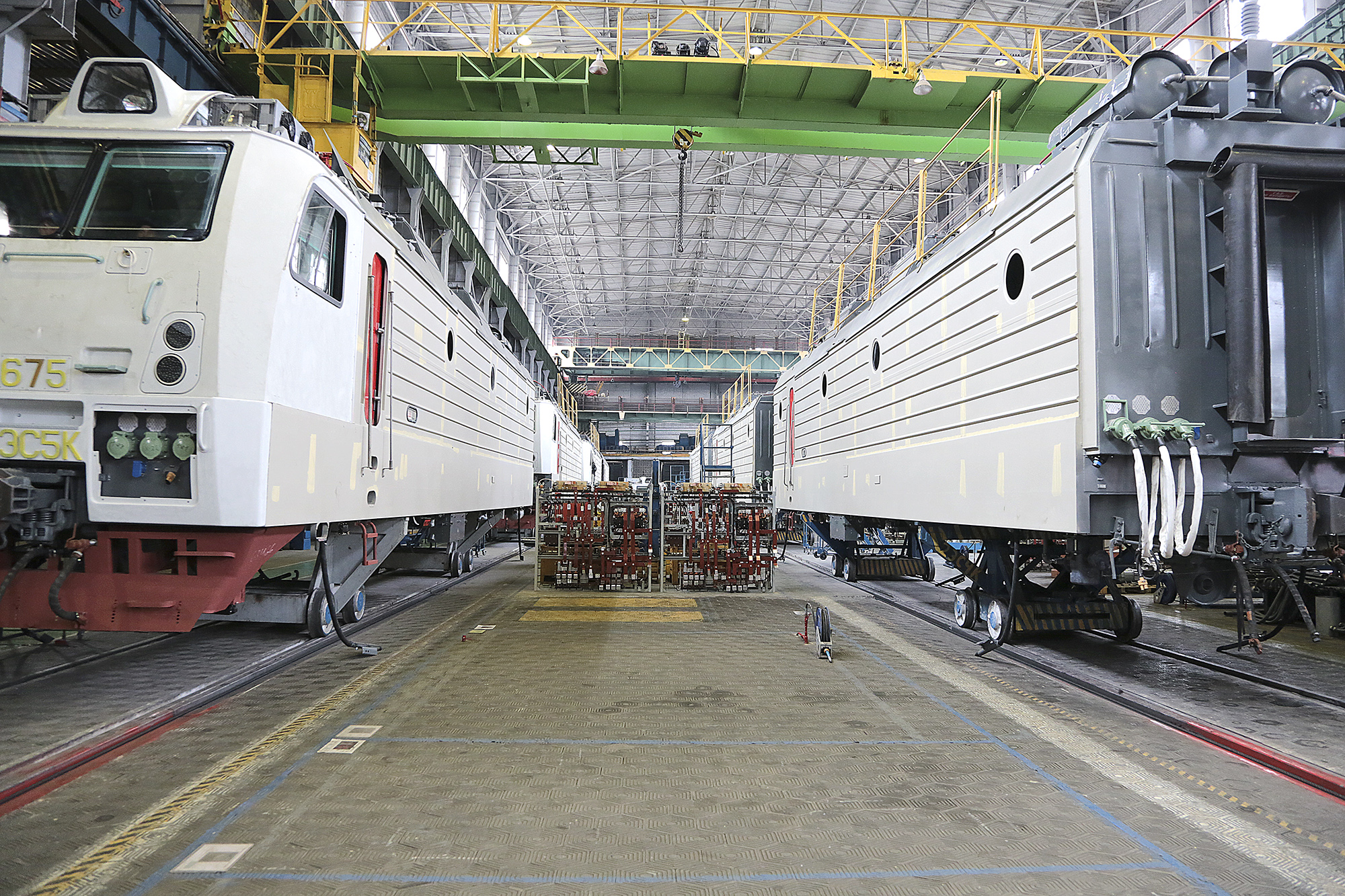
Bodies of 3ES5K units during assembly. Front and rear view

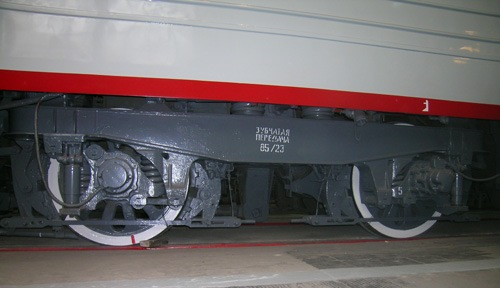
2ES5K bogie

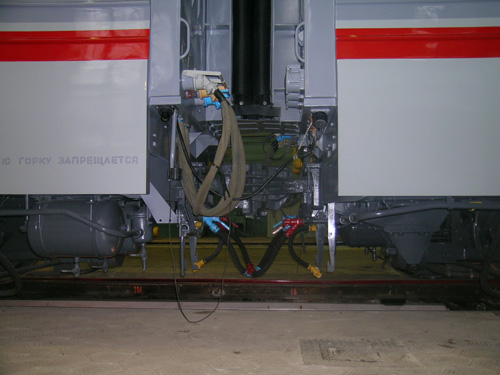
Inter-car coupling

Since 1 October, NEVZ started serial production of the 2ES5K, 3ES5K, and 4ES5K, which have an increased level of passive safety and a redesigned mask by the National Center for Industrial Design and Innovation «2050.Lab» (design concept «Brand DNA»). After undergoing a series of tests on the 3ES5K-1411, such a cab was certified (certificate of compliance with the requirements of the Customs Union Technical Regulations). The metal frame of the cab has been significantly reinforced (by increasing the cross-section of the front beams by 100 mm). Stiffening ribs were added to the floor structure, and stronger steel was used. For railway track lighting, the cab received a GIS-6P LED spotlight with heated glass and LED buffer lights.

In the activities for improving the design in 2023–2024, there is an instruction to install a new door design in the cab (developed by the cab supplier — LLC 'Polet Service'), both for new and already delivered locomotives.

=== Electrical part ===
Overview of the electrical equipment in the 3ES5K engine room

The locomotive uses improved NB-514D traction motors, electric regenerative braking, as well as a microprocessor control system that allows for manual and automatic operation, monitoring of movement parameters, and checking how all the locomotive's equipment is working.

In terms of equipment layout and electrical circuit, the E5K locomotives are similar to the VL85 locomotives, on the basis of which they were created. They differ from the VL85 by using technical solutions that had already been tested on the EP1 family of locomotives — a more efficient ventilation system, capacitor-based starting of auxiliary motors with the possibility of operating at low speed (LS), and the use of a microprocessor-based control and diagnostic system. At low speed, the machines operate thanks to power from the PCHF-136 frequency and a phase converter, which lowers the mains frequency threefold — down to 16.7 Hz, and the voltage down to 40 V (the so-called "fan" parabolic current-voltage characteristic). However, the capacitor start of auxiliary machines, used as a backup on VL locomotives and as the main starting method on EP1 and E5K, was later supplemented with a system using a starter motor PD (the same equipment as the phase splitter on VL60, VL80, and VL85), with subsequent modernization of previously produced locomotives. Unlike the VL locomotives, on the ES5K a regular motor of the same type used for driving fans — NVA-55 — was used as the phase splitter. To install the PD, the PCHF is removed from the locomotive, and the low-frequency operation mode of the machines disappears.

The locomotive connects to the overhead line via a pantograph mounted on the roof of each section (except for the booster (intermediate) section). Unlike the VL80 and VL85 locomotives, the ES5K series uses a semi-pantograph type. From the pantograph, the high voltage from the contact line goes through the main switch (MS) to the primary winding of the traction transformer. The traction transformer (schematically — T5) reduces the contact line voltage to levels needed for the traction motors and auxiliary machines. Like in the VL series locomotives, each unit has one main switch and one traction transformer. The booster unit connects to the contact line through the pantograph of the tail (or head) section. After passing through the primary winding of the traction transformer, the current goes to the rails through the grounding devices.

The traction transformer has four secondary windings. Two of them are traction windings: they supply power to the unit's traction motors through rectifier-inverter converters (RICs). The third winding (the auxiliary winding) powers auxiliary machines and other AC auxiliary circuits. The fourth winding feeds the excitation windings of the traction motors in regenerative braking mode through the excitation rectifier unit (ERU).

Each traction winding of the transformer has 4 terminals, and accordingly, 3 units with voltages of 315 V, 315 V, and 630 V. The voltage between the outer terminals of each winding is 1260 V. The alternating voltage from each traction winding goes to its own rectifier-inverter converter (RIC). Two traction motors, connected in parallel, are connected to each of the two RIC sections (labeled in the diagram as U1 and U2). Each RIC consists of thyristors arranged in 8 legs in a bridge configuration. The presence of 8 legs is due to the three sections of the traction winding and provides voltage control on the traction motors in 4 stages (4-step control). In traction mode, the RICs work as controlled rectifiers, converting alternating voltage into direct current supplied to the traction motors, while also regulating the amount of this direct voltage. Voltage regulation at the VIP output is done by changing the firing angle of the VIP thyristors, as well as by turning on thyristors in certain VIP arms. In regeneration mode, the VIPs work like controlled inverters, converting the DC voltage generated by the traction motors into 50 Hz AC, which is then fed through the traction transformer to the contact network.

From the output of each VIP, a constant (or rather, pulsating) voltage is supplied to two series-connected DC traction motors. In traction mode, the traction motors have series excitation. To control the speed of the locomotive in traction mode, besides changing the voltage on the traction motors using the VIP, there is also a provision to weaken the excitation of the traction motors by connecting shunt resistors in parallel with the motor field windings. The excitation weakening is done in three steps (70%, 52%, and 43%). For this, each motor has 3 groups of excitation weakening resistors. They are connected to the excitation winding through three electropneumatic contactors (there are 12 of these contactors in total according to the diagram). In the excitation weakening mode, inductive shunts are connected in series with the weakening resistors (one shunt per traction motor). They protect the traction motors from current spikes during transitional modes.

The direction of the locomotive is changed (just like on AC electric locomotives of the VL series) by reversing the current flowing through the excitation windings of the motors. This is done using reversers—cam-type switches with an electropneumatic drive. The reversers, according to the QP1 circuit, switch when the motors are de-energized, so the reverser contacts don’t have arc suppression. One reverser is installed for every two traction motors. Interestingly, to move the locomotive forward, the reverser of the front section takes the 'Forward' position, while the reverser of the rear section takes the 'Backward' position.

To smooth out the ripples in the rectified current flowing through the motors, a smoothing reactor is included in the circuit of each traction motor. To reduce the current ripples flowing through the motor excitation windings, each excitation winding is constantly shunted by a separate resistor.

To bring the locomotive into the depot, the traction motors are powered with low voltage from an external source. For this, the "plus" of the power source is supplied to the motor power socket from the depot network, and the "minus" goes to the rails or the locomotive body. The connection of the traction motors to the socket and the locomotive body is done using two 3-pole QS5 disconnectors with manual operation (one switch for two traction motors). Normally, these switches are off; when they are turned on, raising the pantographs is prevented, which stops the motors from being powered by two sources at the same time.

The locomotive is equipped with electric regenerative braking (regeneration). In this mode, the traction motors operate as DC generators with independent excitation: the motors' excitation windings are powered by a separate secondary winding of the traction transformer through an excitation rectifier unit (ERU), using the U3 scheme. It is a controlled thyristor rectifier built on a neutral-point configuration. The ERU converts single-phase AC voltage into a controllable DC voltage that is supplied to the excitation windings. Switching the traction motors to electric regenerative braking mode is done via brake switches—cam switches with an electropneumatic drive. Each section has 2 brake switches, arranged according to the QT1 scheme, one for every two traction motors. In terms of design, the brake switches are similar to the reversers and have two positions—"Drive" and "Brake". In the "Traction" position, they connect the excitation windings of the motors in series with the armature windings. When a command is given to assemble the electric braking circuit, the brake switches move to the "Brake" position. This disconnects the excitation windings from the armature windings and connects all 4 excitation windings in series. After that, a separate electro-pneumatic contactor K1 connects the excitation windings to the VVV. Then the control system opens the VVV thyristors, and current flows through the excitation windings. A DC voltage appears at the terminals of the armature windings, which is converted into AC in the VIP, and then through the traction transformer and the pantograph, it goes into the contact network. The change in armature current, and therefore braking force in regenerative mode, is carried out by altering the excitation current (at high speeds) and by changing the vip thyristor firing angle (at medium and low speeds).

The current of the traction motors' armatures is measured by an ammeter, according to the PA1 circuit, connected through a shunt in the armature circuit of the first traction motor. On 2ES5K locomotives up to number 134 and 3ES5K up to number 054, the voltage on the traction motors is measured by a voltmeter PV2, connected through a resistor in parallel with the armature of the first traction motor. To measure the excitation winding current in regenerative mode, an ammeter PA2 is connected in series with these windings. All these instruments are located on the control panel in the cab of the lead (rear) section.

The currents of the traction motors' armatures are measured by the control system using four armature current sensors (according to the T1 and T2 scheme). One sensor is connected in series with the armature of each motor. To measure the excitation current of the traction motors in regenerative mode, a T15 excitation current sensor is connected in series with the excitation windings. Voltage sensors T3 are connected in parallel to armatures 2 and 4 of the traction motors to measure the motor voltages in regenerative mode.

=== Interior ===
The locomotive is equipped with the following train safety systems: KLUB-U, SAUT-CM/485, and TSKBM. The design of the control cab has been improved, thermoelectric air conditioners and panel heaters have been installed, and overall working conditions for the locomotive crew have been enhanced (the locomotive comes with a refrigerator and sanitary equipment).

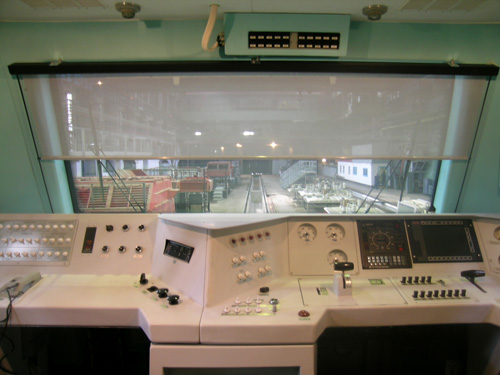
2ES5K driver's cab

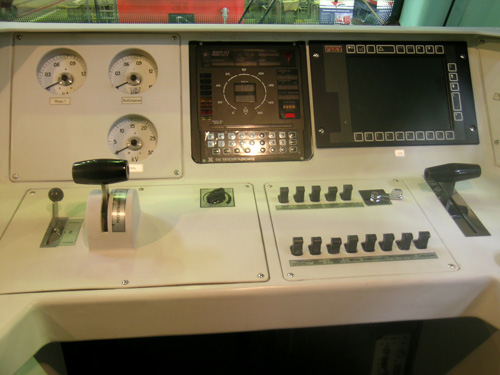
2ES5K control panel

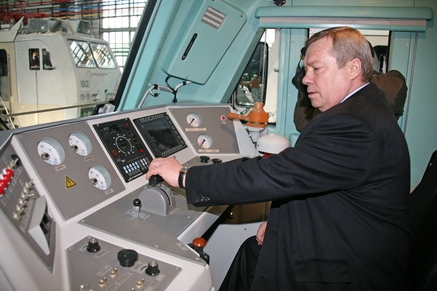
Governor of the Rostov Region Vasily Yu. Golubev in the cab of the 3ES5K

== Service ==
=== 2ES5K ===
The first 2ES5K-001 electric locomotive, in early 2005 shortly after its introduction, went through initial testing on the test loop in Novocherkassk and in the spring of the same year, arrived at the Shcherbinka loop near Moscow at the VNIIZhT for trials. On 4 August of that year, the locomotive was shown to the President of Russia, Vladimir Putin, who rode around the loop in the cab of the locomotive and even drove it for part of the way. At the end of the year, a second locomotive also arrived in Shcherbinka for testing the braking systems, while the first one was sent for dynamic and strength tests on the Belorechenskaya–Maykop section.

In 2006, locomotive numbered 001 was returned to the factory, where a booster unit was temporarily added, after which it was tested on the NEVZ loop as a 3ES5K. Then all the locomotives, including the first one in a three-unit configuration and the others in two-unit, went to the Ulan-Ude depot for trial operation with freight trains on the East-Siberian and Trans-Baikal railways. Locomotive 2ES5K-001, as 3ES5K, completed a 5,000 km operational run from Mariinsk station on the Krasnoyarsk railway, traveling through the East-Siberian and Trans-Baikal railways to Karymskaya station. During the initial operation, the electric locomotives successfully met the expected performance and hauled heavy freight trains through the pass. After that, all the locomotives except 001 continued regular service, while 001 was returned to the factory in the summer of 2006 and continued testing in Shcherbinka until spring 2007. Later, its booster unit was removed, and the locomotive was assigned for regular service at the Vikhorevka depot.

2ES5K locomotives with a freight train with two pairs at the front and the back

The first batch of 2ES5K electric locomotives, after a short period of service at the Ulan-Ude depot, were transferred to the Vikhorevka and Smolyaninovo depots, where all new locomotives of the series were sent. Many 2ES5K locomotives at these depots were joined in a multiple-unit setup in a four-unit configuration. On the Smolyaninovo — Nakhodka section of the Far Eastern Railway, which has a challenging mountainous profile, four two-unit locomotives started being used in two pairs—two at the front of the train and two at the back as bankers—for hauling trains weighing 6,300 tons.

A batch of 15 2ES5K locomotives was sold to Ukrainian Railways at the Podolsk depot, where they started operating together with 18 2EL5 electric locomotives.

Later, locomotives also started arriving at other depots in the eastern regions of Russia, mainly Khabarovsk II, Chita, and Belogorsk. Some locomotives also went to the October Railway in the European part of Russia, at the Kandalaksha depot. Unlike the first two depots, the locomotives there are used individually.

Some 2ES5K locomotives, after finishing their main tests, occasionally took part in various trials, exhibitions, and train parades held on the VNIIZhT ring in Shcherbinka near Moscow. For example; locomotives E5K-001 and 3ES5K-014 were part of the Expo 1520 exhibition in 2007, and locomotive 2ES5K-137 took part in a train parade during the Expo 1520 exhibition in 2013.

=== 3ES5K ===
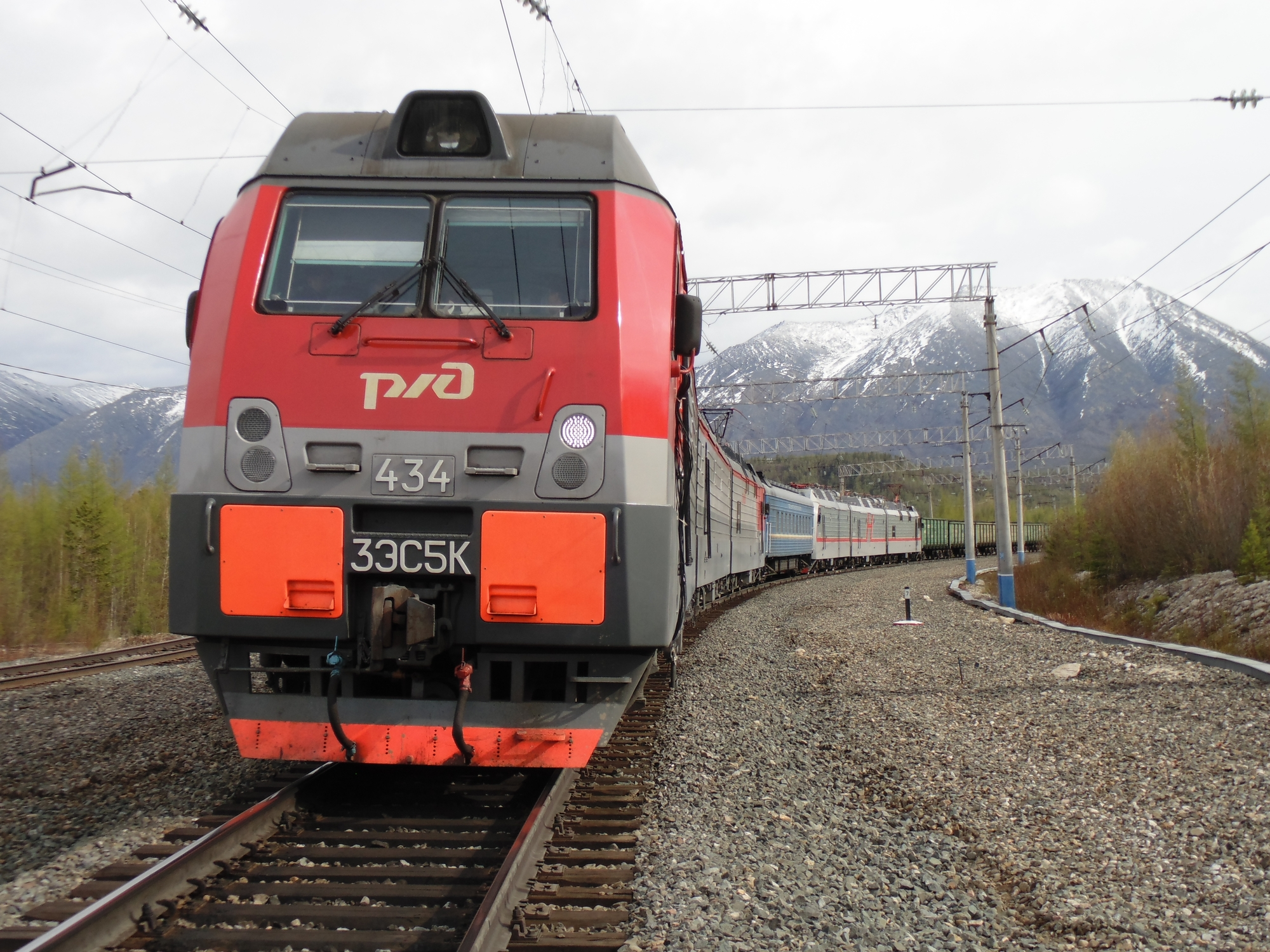
3ES5K-434 with a laboratory car and another 3ES5K during tests

The 3ES5K locomotives were delivered to the same Russian Railways depots as most of the 2ES5K. Initially, they were sent to Khabarovsk II and Vikhorevka, but since 2011, the vast majority have been going to the Chita depot. Unlike the 2ES5K, they weren’t linked in multiple-unit systems, but there are known cases of them being used together in the same train when hauling heavy loads.

In 2013, the 3ES5K-434 locomotive of increased weight with axle-by-axle traction control was released. For two years, it went through testing on the Novocherkassk loop and sections of the North Caucasus Railway at the Bataisk depot. For a short time, it was tested in a four-unit configuration together with a new booster unit from the 4ES5K-001, and since the autumn of 2015, it was again in a three-unit configuration and sent to the Chita depot for a 5,000-kilometer trial run and experimental operation. During the tests, the locomotive hauled trains accompanied by another locomotive coupled behind it. In April 2016, it was transferred to the Vikhorevka depot, where it was tested on the Tayshet–Taksimo section with a complex profile, confirming its higher efficiency compared to regular locomotives, after which it entered regular service.

The 3ES5K-879 locomotive with improved converters was also sent from the factory to the testing loop for trials.

On 22 November 2018, 2 3ES5K locomotives with axle traction force control were transferred to the Uzbekistan Railways under a contract signed in mid-2018.

=== E5K ===
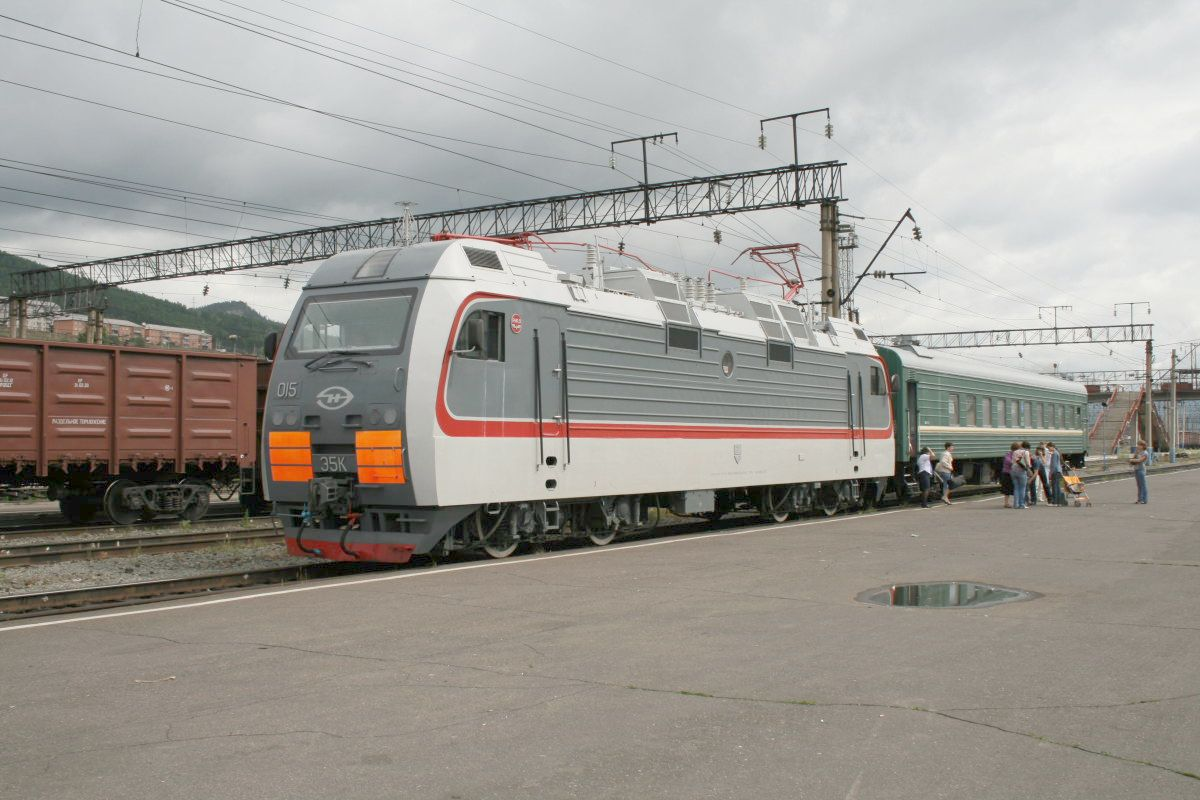
E5K-015 with the suburban train Kirenga – Lena at Lena railway station

The Э5К-001 locomotive, introduced in March 2007, after passing factory tests on the Novocherkassk loop, started service at the Bataysk depot in May and ran for 5,000 km on the section between Likhaya, Bataysk, and Timashevskaya stations. After successfully completing it in June 2007, the locomotive was sent for certification dynamic-strength tests and track impact tests on the Belorechenskaya—Maykop section of the North Caucasus Railway. In the second half of the summer, the locomotive also underwent tests on the VNIIZhT loop in Shcherbinka, where it was later shown at the Expo 1520 exhibition, and then returned to the Bataysk depot, completing its tests by the end of the year. After that, the electric locomotives that started being produced after the locomotive, were sent to the eastern regions of Russia to the depots Khabarovsk II, Vikhorevka, Ulan-Ude, Irkutsk-Sorting, Severobaikalsk, Nizhneudinsk, and Abakan-II, occasionally being transferred between depots. The locomotives started pulling suburban, service, and small freight trains, replacing VL60 locomotives.

Distribution of locomotives by numbers as of the end of October 2024:
Locale	Depot	Operator	Quantity	Fleet umber
Far Eastern Railway	Khabarovsk II	RZD	10	001-010
East Siberian Railway	Vihhorevka	RZD	9	011, 014–018, 021, 022, 024
Trans-Baikal Railway	Belogorsk	RZD	5	0212, 01, 019, 020, 023
Krasnoyarsk Railway	Abakan-II	RZD	8	025-032

=== 4ES5K ===
Since August 2014, the 4ES5K locomotives were tested on the NEVZ loop. From November 2014, the locomotives underwent certification tests on the Belorechenskaya–Maykop section, and in January 2015 they received their certificate of conformity.

All locomotives of this series were delivered to the Smolyaninovo depot, where they started regularly hauling heavy freight trains together with pairs of 2ES5K locomotives from February 2015. Thanks to the use of per-axle traction control, they turned out to be more efficient than the 2×2ES5K setups. During operation, there hasn't been a single failure or unscheduled repair of the motor-axle roller bearings.

In September 2015, locomotive numbered 003 was sent to the VNIIZhT loop in Shcherbinka to take part in a train parade at the Expo 1520 exhibition. In 2017, a similar parade on the same loop from 30 August to 2 September featured the new electric locomotive numbered 004, and in October of the same year, locomotive numbered 001 participated in the parade in Vladivostok to celebrate the 120th anniversary of the Far Eastern Railway.

Distribution of 4ES5K locomotives as of November 2025:
Locale	Depot	Operator	Quantity	Fleet number
Far Eastern Railway	Smolyaninovo	RZD	82	001–016, 018–039, 040, 041, 043, 045–085
South Urals Railway	Kartaly	RZD	3	017, 042, 044

=== 2ES5S and 3ES5S ===
Distribution of 2ES5S and 3ES5S locomotives by numbers as of August 2024:
Locale	Depot	Operator	Quantity		Fleet number	
Locale	Depot	Operator	2ES5S	3ES5S	2ES5S	3ES5S
North Caucasus Railway	Timashevskaya (2ES5S), NEVZ (3ES5S)	RZD	5	2	001–005	001, 002
