= Vladimir (station) =

Railway station in Vladimir Oblast, Russia

Vladimir-Passazhirsky

General information
- Location: Russia
- Coordinates: 56.12944°N 40.42167°E
- Platforms: 4
- Tram routes: 5

History
- Opened: 1861
Location

Vladimir (Russian: Влади́мир, and officially Vladimir-Passazhirsky (Russian: Владимир-Пассажирский) is a junction railway station serving the Gorky Railway on the Nizhny Novgorod line of the Trans-Siberian Railway in the city of Vladimir in Russia.

== History ==
The old station building, despite its architectural value, was demolished in the 1970s. In 1975, a new, currently operational, railway station building was constructed, designed by Mosgiprotrans Institute architects M. A. Gotlib, V. Ya. Evstigneev, E. N. Kmitovich, and Yu. Ya. Melyushkin. The station welcomed its first passengers on January 26, 1976.

Decorations above the entrance to the station building

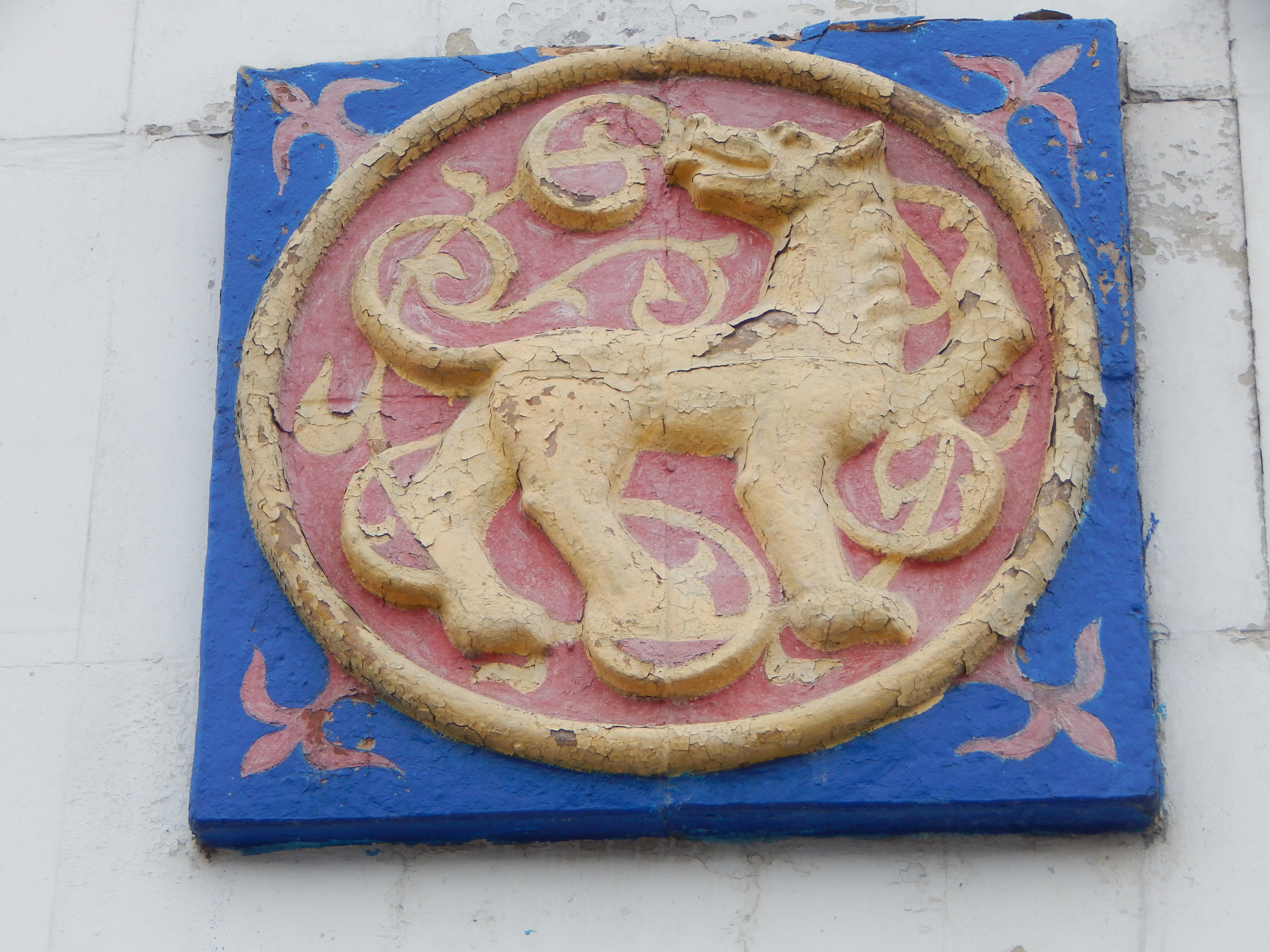

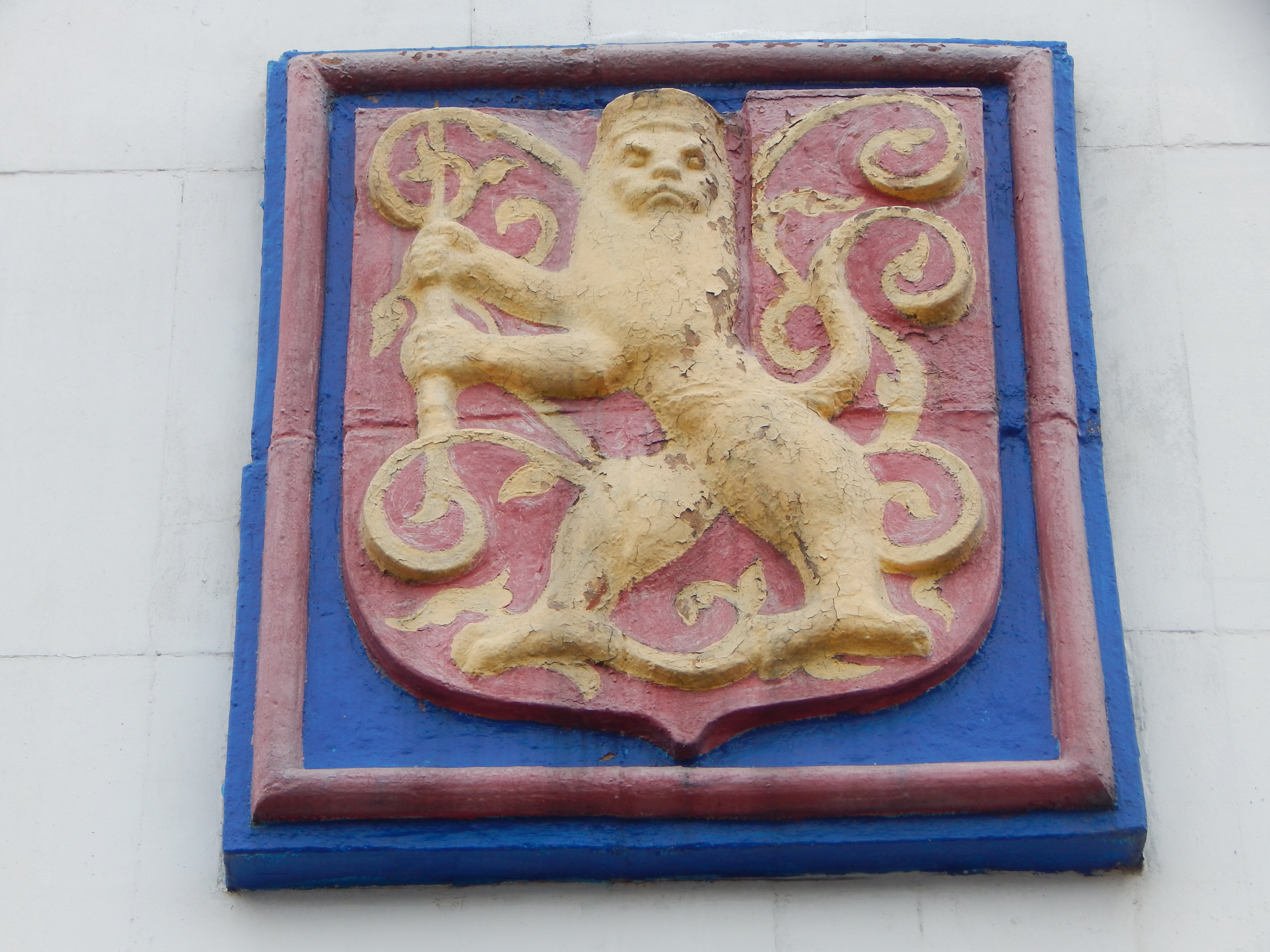

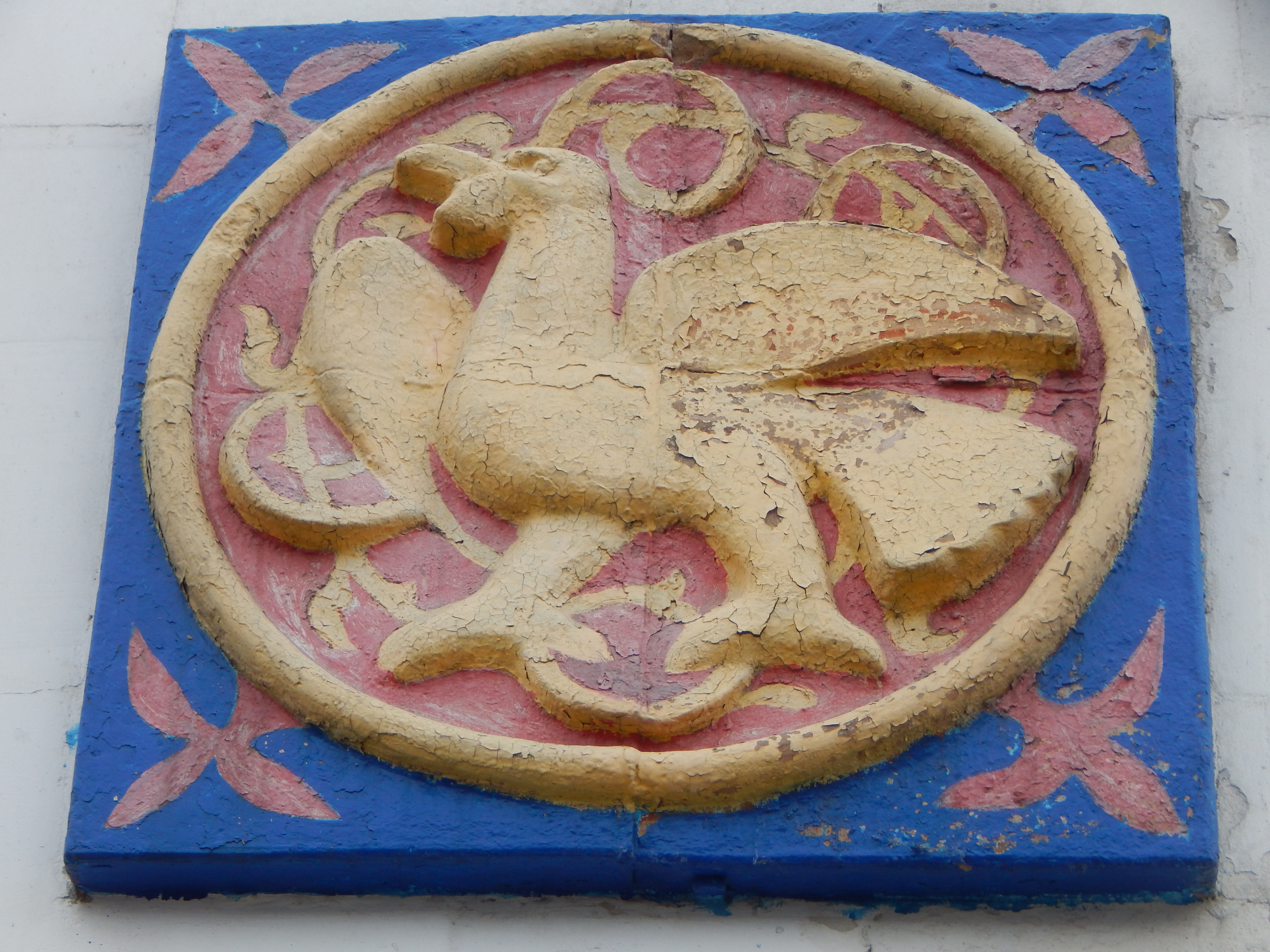

On May 14, 2011, in honor of the 120th anniversary of the Trans-Siberian Railway and 1,000 days before the opening of the Olympic Games in Sochi, the "120 Years of the Trans-Siberian Railway" alley was ceremoniously laid out on Vokzalnaya Square.

== Photo gallery ==
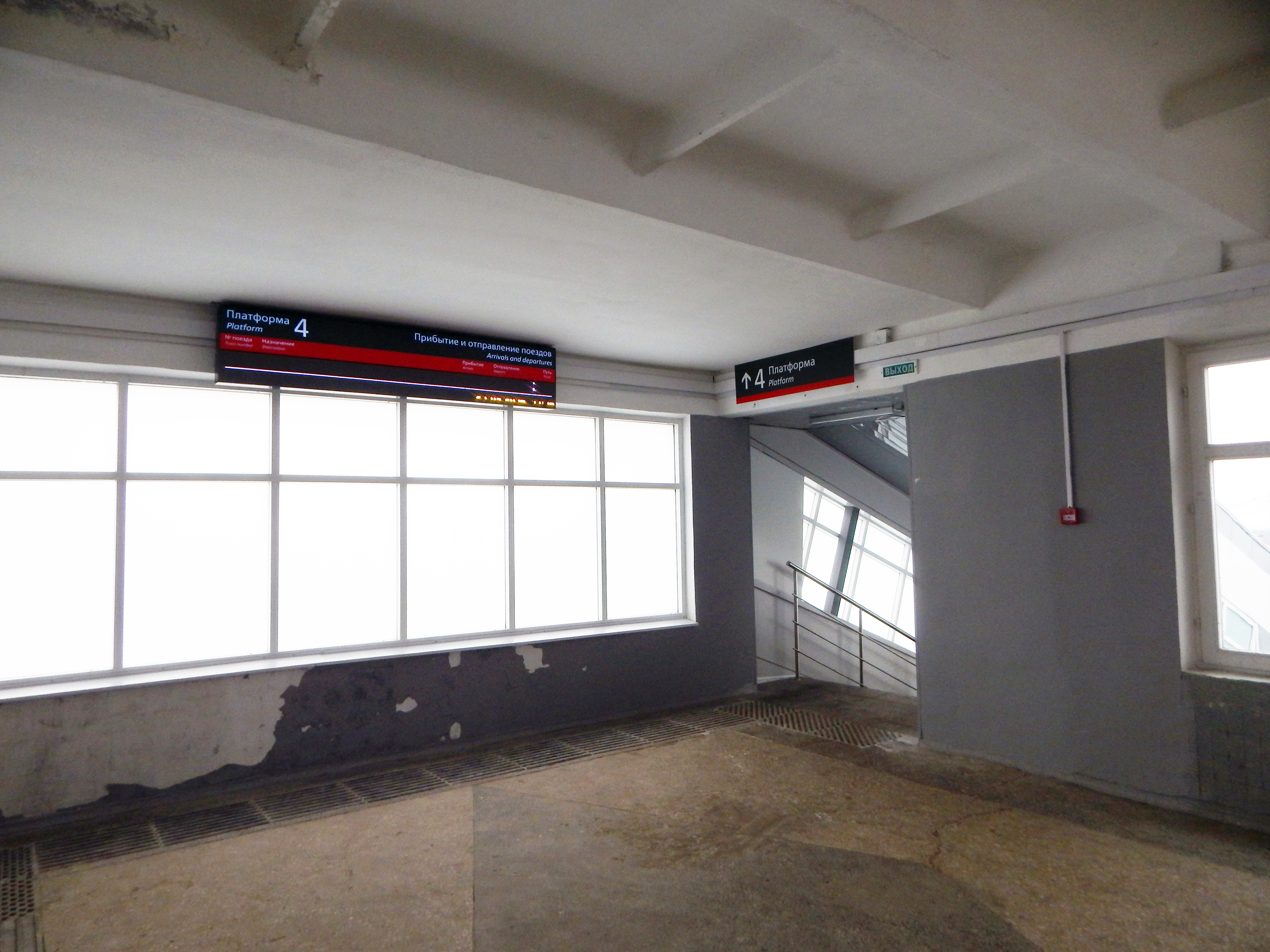
Exit to the fourth platform from the station's distribution building

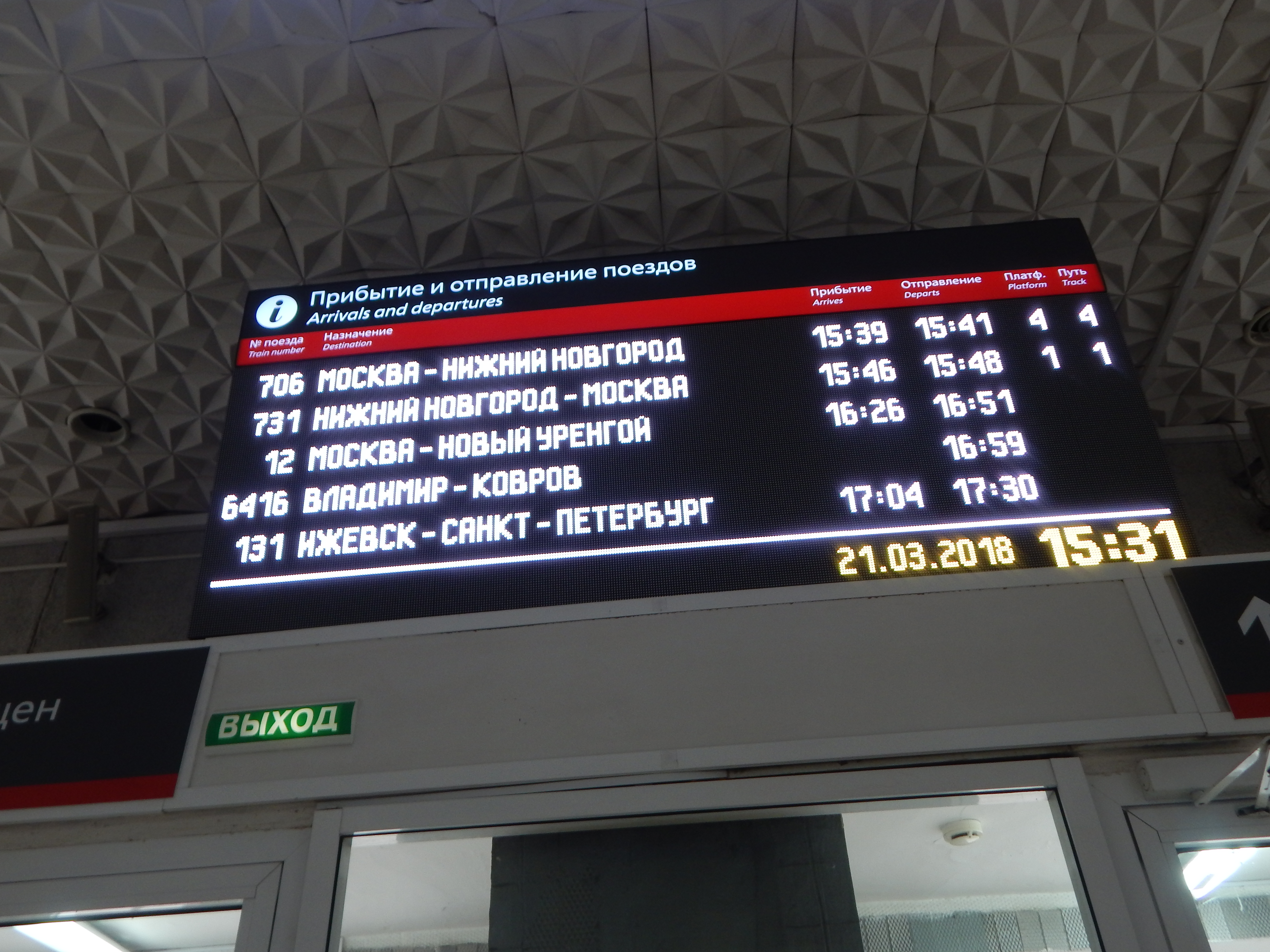
Train departure board at the station

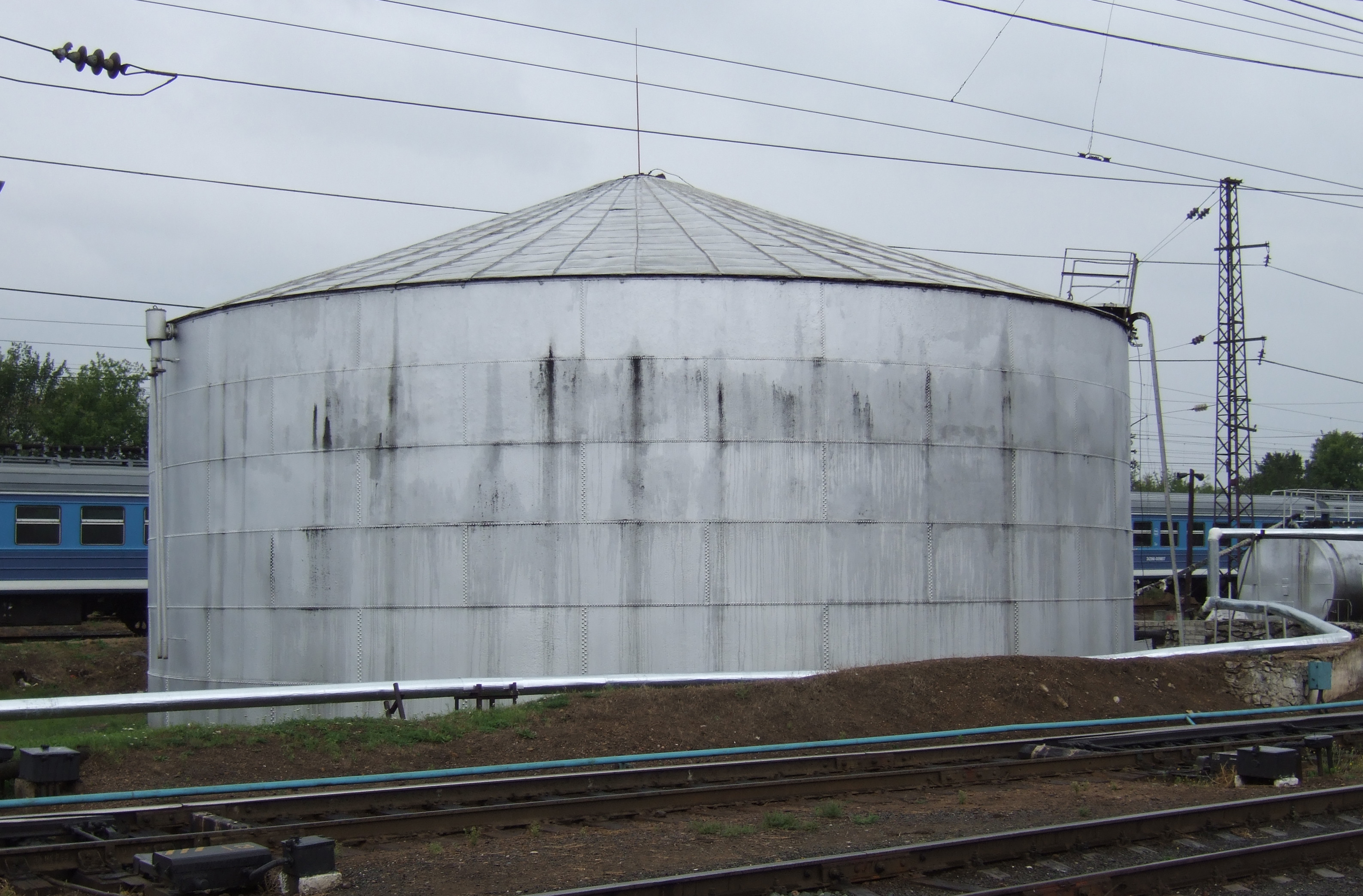
An antique riveted Shukov reservoir at the Vladimir railway station, 2007

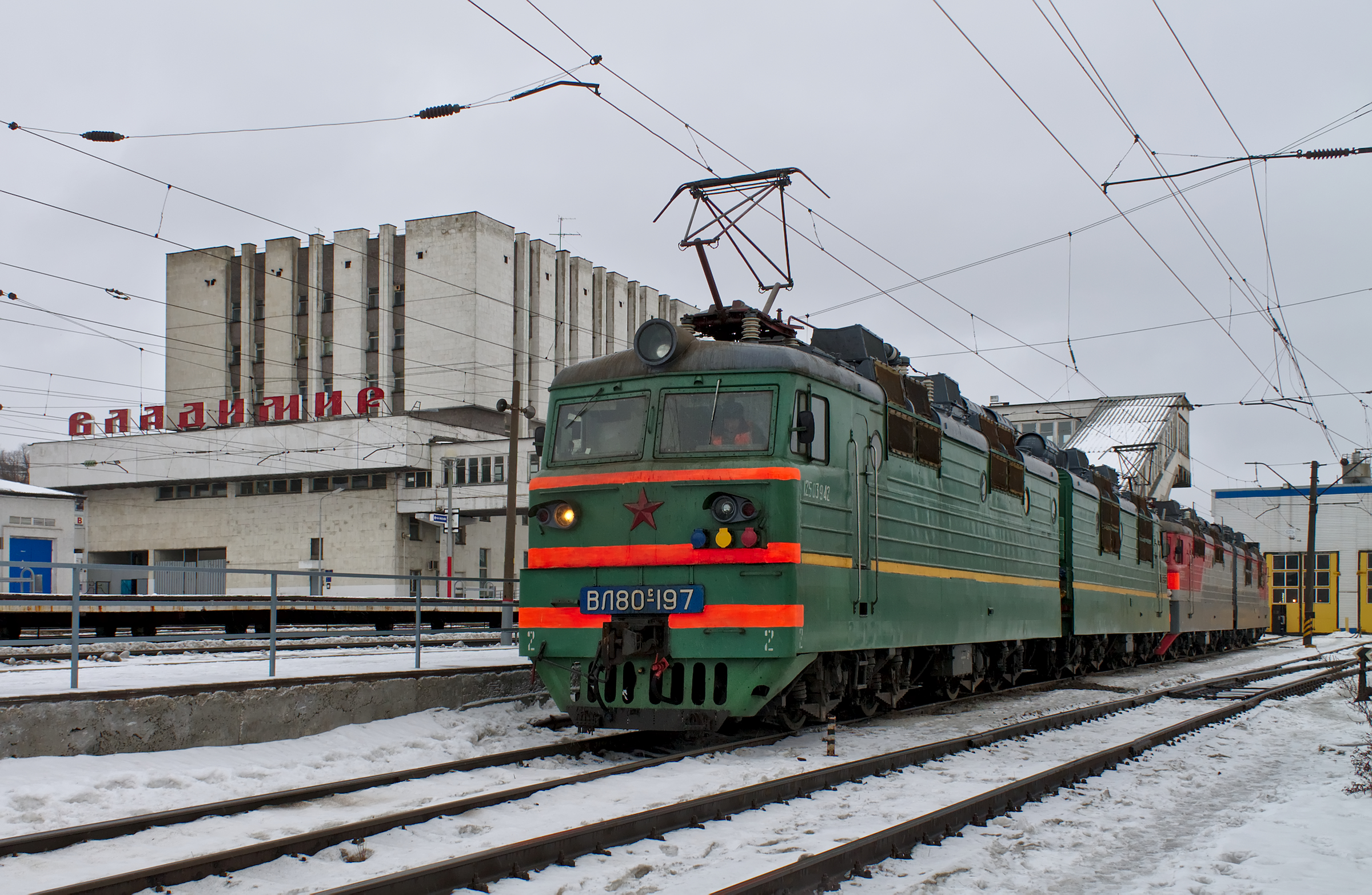
Electric VL80 at the Vladimir station
