= VL85 =

Class of 270 Soviet electric locomotives

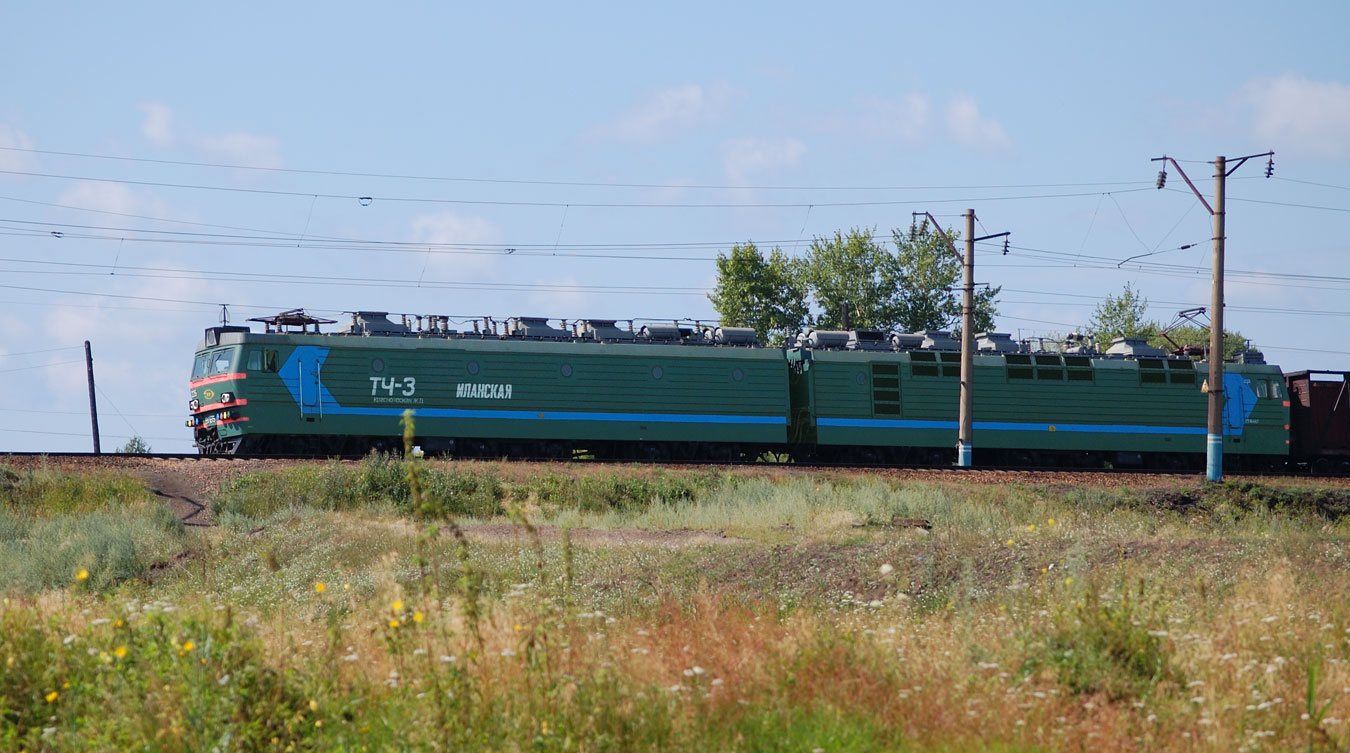
Type and origin
- Builder: Novocherkassk Electric Locomotive Plant
- Build date: 1983 - 1994
- Total produced: 270
Specifications
- Configuration
  - UIC: Bo'Bo'Bo'+Bo'Bo'Bo'
- Gauge: 1,524 mm (5 ft); 1,520 mm (4 ft 11 27/32 in) Russian gauge
- Wheel diameter: 1,250 mm (4 ft 1 in)
- Minimum curve: 125 m (410 ft)
- Length: 45.00 m (147 ft 8 in)
- Width: 3.24 m (10 ft 8 in)
- Height: 5.1 m (16 ft 9 in)
- Loco weight: 288 t (283 long tons; 317 short tons)
- Electric system/s: 25 kV 50 Hz AC Catenary
- Current pickup: Pantograph
- Traction motors: 12×НБ-514 (en: NB-514)
- Loco brake: Regenerative
Performance figures
- Maximum speed: 110 km/h (68 mph)
- Power output: 9,360 kW (12,550 hp) Continuous 10,020 kW (13,440 hp) Short Term
Career
- Operators: РЖД (RZhD)
- Nicknames: бык (Ox)
- Locale: Russia; Soviet Union

The VL85 (Russian: ВЛ85) is a Soviet (and later Russian) built electric mainline freight locomotive manufactured at the Novocherkassk Electric Locomotive Plant (NEVZ) and designed under the management of V.Ya.Sverdlov (ru:В.Я.Свердлов).

== History ==
Designed by the Vsesoyuzny nauchno-issledovatel'ski i proektno-konstruktorski institut elektrovozostroeniya (en: USSR national scientific research and design-engineering institute of electric locomotive construction) – the VL85 was at the time of its introduction the most powerful production locomotive in the world. The first prototypes were built in 1983 and were tested on the experimental ring at the All-Russian Research Institute of Railway Transport (VNIIZhT). Further testing was performed on the North-Caucasian Railway. Full production began in 1985 and continued until 1994. A total of 270 units were built. All VL85 locomotives operate on the East-Siberian Railway and the Krasnoyarsk Railway, from depots at Ilanskaya, Taishet, Nizhneudinsk, and Ulan-Ude.

== Technical characteristics ==
The VL85 is twin-section electric locomotive consisting of two identical units, resting on three two axle bogies, and powered by twelve NB-514 traction motors delivering a continuous output of 12,450 horsepower (9.28 MW). The VL85 operates on single-phase alternating current. The locomotives are equipped for regenerative braking and are designed to operate in temperatures from −50 to 40 °C (−58 to 104 °F), and at altitudes up to 1,400 meters (4,600 ft). The minimum radius of curvature it can negotiate is 125 meters (410 ft). Total weight is 288 metric tons (283 long tons; 317 short tons).

Traction and braking forces are transmitted to the body via inclined rods. The end bogies on each unit have a cradle suspension, while the central Jacobs bogie has a set of swinging compressed elastic rods to allow for lateral movement through curves.

To provide current collection there is a pantograph above each cab. Each unit has a 7,100 kVA traction transformer, model ONDTSE-10000/25-82UHL2. Each transformer has a high voltage winding and three traction windings. Each section also has three VIP-4000 rectifiers. Each is powered by its own traction winding and provides power to two parallel connected traction motors on a bogie. These rectifiers use thyristor control and also convert power back to alternating current during regenerative braking.

The first two prototypes used the same NB-418K6 traction motors as the VL80 series. Production units use the NB-514 model. Improvements in the aerodynamics of the ventilation ducts reduced the number of cooling fans for this motor by half.

A new feature of the cab is a single large control panel in the centre, replacing separate panels for the driver and assistant. In service these locomotives are nicknamed 'Ox' because of their size. Despite the theoretically greater adhesion that should be provided by the new suspension system (the point of transfer is below the axles) these units are noted as being slightly less 'grippy' than their VL80R predecessor, possibly due to difficulty in attaining perfect weight distribution across the three bogies.
