= All-Union Scientific and Research, Planning and Design Technological Institute on Electric Locomotives Building =

Engineering firm in Rostov Oblast, Russia

All-Russian Scientific and Research, Planning and Design Technological Institute on Electric Locomotives Building (JSC «VELNII»)
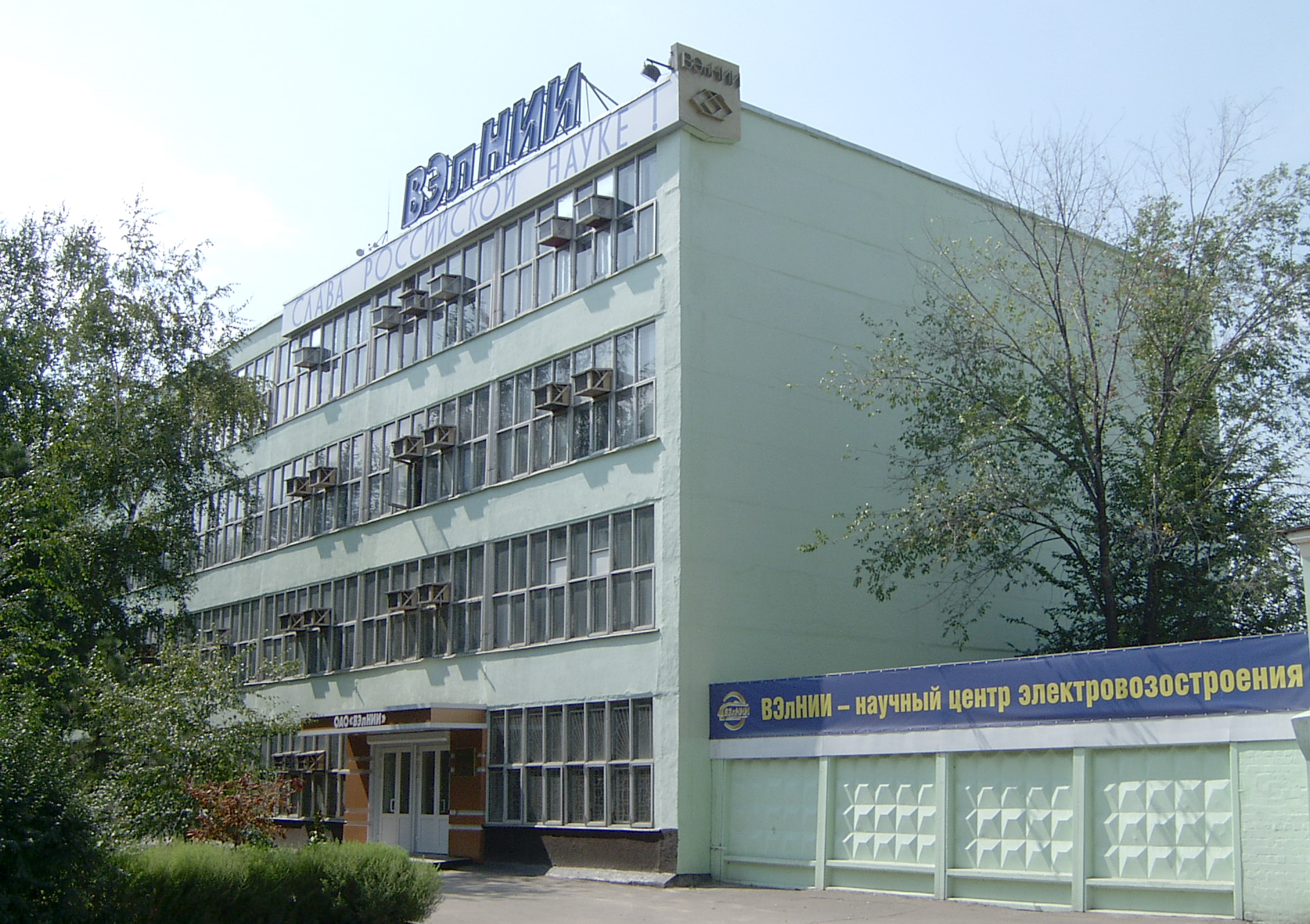
- Formation: November 21, 1958; 67 years ago
- Location: Novocherkassk, Russia
- Coordinates: 47.470679°N 40.065867°E
- Official language: Russia
- Parent organization: CJSC Transmashholding
- Staff: 384
- Website: http://www.velnii.ru/
- Formerly called: Scientific and Research Institute on Electric Locomotives Building (ЭлНИИ, ELNII); All-Union Scientific and Research, Planning and Design Technological Institute on Electric Locomotives Building (ВЭлНИИ, VELNII)

The Research and Development Institute of Electric Locomotive Engineering (ElNII) was created in 1958 in pursuance of two Government Resolutions "Of Fifteen-Year Master Railway Electrification Plan for the Period of 1956-1971" (1956) and "Of Actions for Insurance of Manufacture of Main-Line Electric Locomotives for Railway Transports" (1958).
The task of VElNII was to perform research and development works and based on the obtained results to creation innovative types of electric locomotives conforming to the conditions and requirements of operation on railways.

== History ==
November 21, 1958 - Date of ELNII (Scientific and Research Institute on Electric Locomotives Building) foundation
June 25, 1963 - Date of reorganization into All-Union Scientific and Research, Planning and Design Technological Institute on Electric Locomotives Building – VELNII
January, 1993 - Establishing of Open Joint Stock Company "VELNII"

== Researches ==
Experts of the institute resolve a large quantity of complicated scientific and technical issues, among which are:

- Development of design documentation for manufacture of main-line electric locomotives, EMUs and other electric equipment for railway and other rail transport.
- Research works in the field of locomotive engineering.
- Commissioning works, various types of tests of electric locomotives, units and other equipment for rail transports.
- Development and testing of advanced development insulation systems for traction engines of electric locomotives.
- Product and enterprise manufacturing facilities certification tests.
- Calibration of control instruments.
- Development, manufacture and implementation of special testing equipment for electric machinery and devices of low and high power, and also rail transport.
- Patent protection and patent infringement search for its own developments, provision of information and advertising, editorial and intermediary services.

== Directors of the Institute ==
1. 2011—2017: A.I. Zhirkov
2. 2017—2018: Y.A. Orlov
3. 2018—2019: A.Y. Orlov
4. 2019—2021: D.I. Uvarov
5. 2021–present: K.I. Ryzhov
