= South Urals Railway =

Railroad company in Russia and Kazakhstan

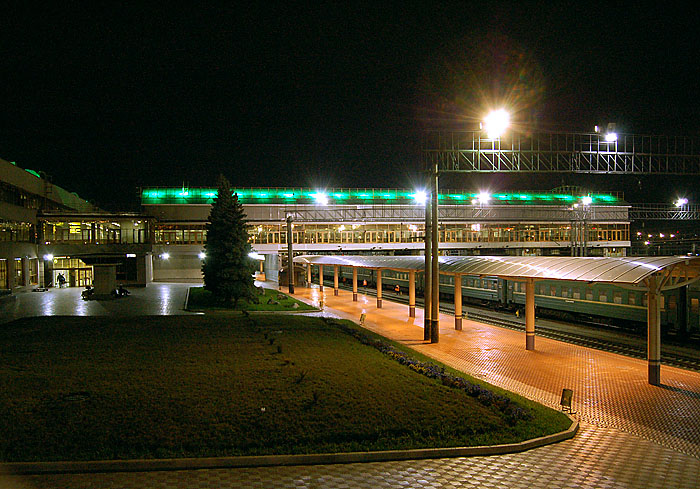
Train station in Chelyabinsk

The Yuzhno–Uralskaya Railway (Russian: Южно-Уральская железная дорога; "South Ural Railway") is a subsidiary of the Russian Railways headquartered in Chelyabinsk. It is responsible for operating the railway network in several regions, including Orenburg, Chelyabinsk, Kurgan, and Sverdlovsk regions, as well as the Republic of Bashkortostan. The total length of the railway is 4,935 km. Sections of the railway pass through the territory of present-day Kazakhstan.

The railway was part of the Ural, or Perm, Railway until 1934. The Chelyabinsk–Yekaterinburg line was constructed in the 1880s and early 1890s as part of the Trans-Siberian Railway (its southern route). The Orenburg-Samara line was opened in 1877. Several other lines were added during Joseph Stalin's industrialization to serve the Magnitogorsk Iron and Steel Works and other newly built factories.
