= VL80 =

Class of 4921 Soviet electric locomotives

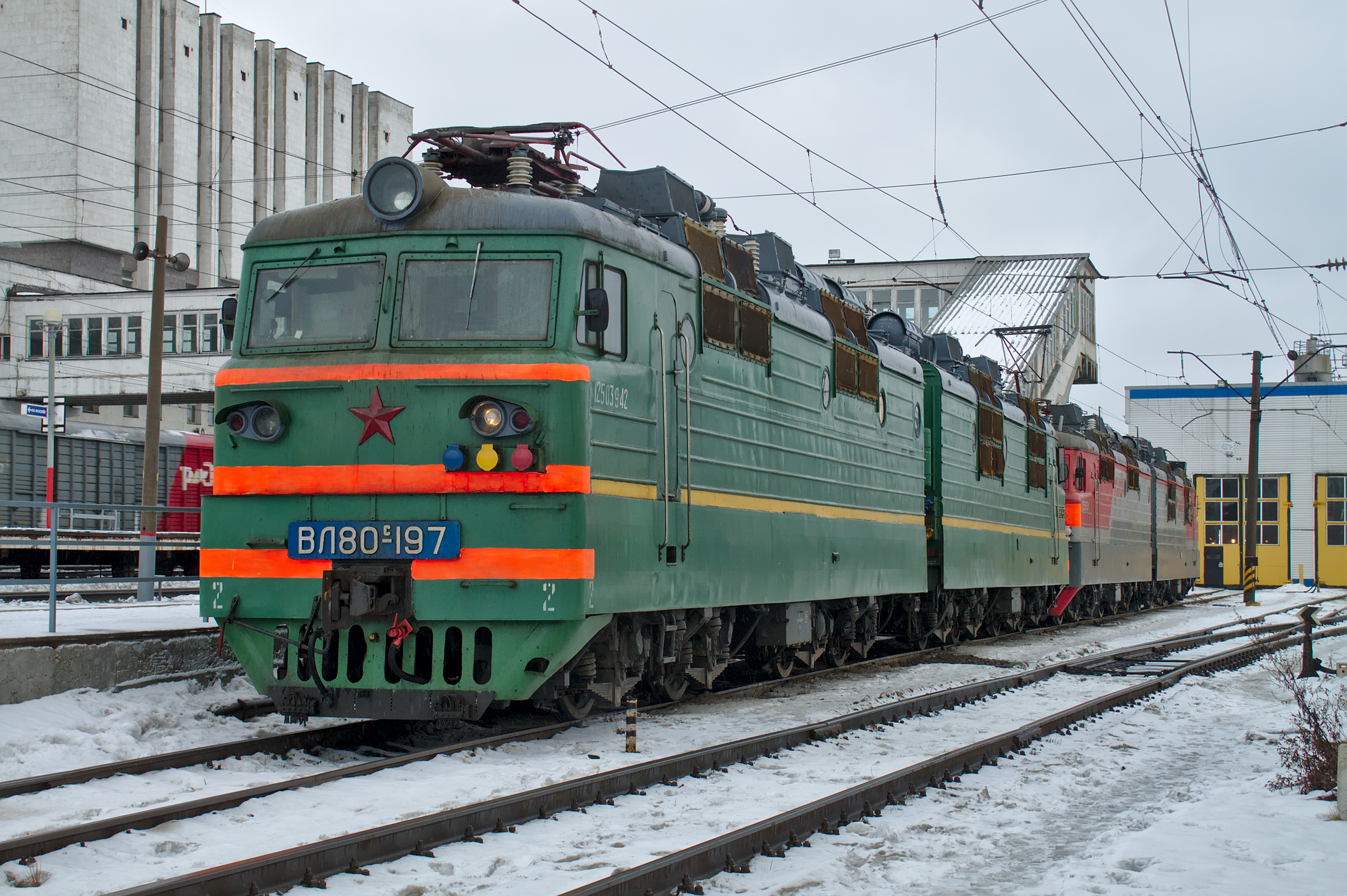
- VL80S in Vladimir, Russia
Type and origin
- Power type: Electric
- Builder: NEVZ SUN RUS
- Build date: 1961 - 1995
- Total produced: 4,921
Specifications
- Configuration
  - UIC: Bo′Bo′+Bo′Bo′
- Gauge: 1,520 mm (4 ft 11 27/32 in)
- Length: 32.48 m (106 ft 7 in)
- Height: 5.1 m (16 ft 9 in)
- Electric system/s: 25 kV 50 Hz AC Catenary
- Current pickup: Pantograph
- Traction motors: 8×НБ-418К6 (en: NB-418K6)
- Loco brake: ?
- Train brakes: Mechanical pneumatic
Performance figures
- Maximum speed: 110 km/h (68 mph)
- Power output: 4,880 or 6,400 kW (6,540 or 8,580 hp) (depending on model)
Career
- Operators: РЖД, БЧ, КТЗ, УЗ, OTY
- Locale: Russia; Soviet Union; Belarus; Kazakhstan; Ukraine; Uzbekistan

The VL80 (ru: ВЛ80) is a Soviet (and later Russian) built electric AC mainline freight locomotive. The initials VL are those of Vladimir Lenin (ru: Владимир Ленин), after whom the class is named.

== History ==
Designed by the Всероссийский научно-исследовательский и проектно-конструкторский институт электровозостроения (en: All-Russian scientific research and design-engineering institute of electric locomotive construction) – usually abbreviated to ВЭлНИИ – the VL80 had the longest production span of any Soviet electric locomotive at 33 years from 1961 to 1995. All variants of the series were built at the Novocherkassk Electric Locomotive Plant (NEVZ; ru: НЭВЗ) with all mechanical parts, traction engines, and auxiliary electric machinery manufactured there as well. Some of the important components, such as the tractive transformer, were sourced from other factories.

The first VL80s were characterised by their mercury arc rectifiers. Later, they were replaced with silicon ones, thus giving birth to the ВЛ80^{К} (en: VL80^{K}) series. The К stands for кремний, the Russian word for silicon. Between the years 1963 and 1971, a total of 695 VL80^{K}s had been produced.

Currently, the VL80 series is used on all electrified routes in Russia, as well as in Kazakhstan, Uzbekistan, Belarus, and Ukraine.

== Technical data ==
The VL80 is a dual-section (or articulated) locomotive composed of two identical units, each resting on two two-axle bogies, powered by eight НБ-418К6 (en: NB-418K6) electric tractive motors equipped with axle-support suspension. In order to pick up the current from overhead lines, the VL80 is fitted with two pantographs; one above the driver's cab on each section. Similarly, each section of the locomotive is equipped with one ОДЦЭ-5000/25Б (en: ODCE-5000/25B) tractive transformer. The VL80^{T} and ВЛ80^{С} (en: VL80^{S}) models are furnished with dynamic brakes.

== VL80^{T} ==
Manufactured between 1967 and 1984, the VL80^{T} (ru: ВЛ80^{т}) introduced a markedly different electrical system, as well as an improved lateral support system which improved the locomotive's stability. Originally, the series used spring suspension similar to that found in the VL80^{K}, but all models built since 1971 have cradle suspension. A total of 1,317 units were made during the 17 years in which the series was in production.

== VL80^{R} ==
Designed for use along the difficult sections of the Krasnoyarsk, Eastern Siberia, and Far Eastern routes – as well as the "Батайск" (en: Bataysk) depot in the North Caucasus – the VL80^{R} (ru: ВЛ80^{Р}) has the same tractive capabilities as the VL80^{T} and the VL80^{S}. The difference between the VL80^{R} and the two aforementioned models is that it has an improved anti-wheelslip system which continuously regulates the amount of voltage supplied to the traction engines, thus ensuring that an increase in thrust doesn't result in jerks, which invariably lead to wheelslip. The VL80^{R} gets its R designation from the fact that it is fitted with regenerative braking (ru: рекуперативное торможение) mechanism.

Several locomotives, assigned to the Krasnoyarsk section, have been modernised and are capable of participating in MU operations with consists containing 3 coupled units.

Despite having been in production for about 13 years (1973-1986), a mere 373 examples rolled out of the NEVZ plant.

=== Notable examples ===
ВЛ80^{Р}-1549 was used as an exhibit at the Электро-77 (en: Elektro-77) expo held in Moscow in June 1977.

Built in 1982, ВЛ80^{Р}-1718 became the 10,000th locomotive to be produced by NEVZ, since the plant's inception in 1936.

ВЛ80^{Р}-1685 featured in the Soviet film Магистраль (en: Mainline) and has obtained cult status amongst Russian rail enthusiasts.

== VL80^{S} ==
The VL80^{S} (ru: ВЛ80^{с}) is simply a VL80^{T} which has been modified for use in MU operations. The 'S' in its name derives from the first letter of the Russian term for multiple-unit train control: Система Многих Единиц (literally: Multiple Unit System) and commonly shortened to СМЕ.

The first VL80^{S}s to roll off the production line were designed to work with only two or four coupled units (or sections). In 1982, unit numbers 550, 551, and 552 were built to work with sets of two, three, or four sections. All VL80^{S}s built since 1983 (ВЛ80^{с}-697 being the first of these) have this capability. The only restriction is that the consist cannot be a third trailer section equipped with dynamic brakes. Due to the needed design modifications, the new certified weight became 192 t (212 short tons).

A total of 2,746 examples were built at the NEVZ works between 1979 and 1995.

== VL80^{SM} ==
The last of the VL80 series, only 4 VL80^{SM}s (ru: ВЛ80^{см}) were built during the model's three year, post-Soviet production life (1991-1994). All four units are currently housed at the Bataysk depot in the North Caucasus.
