= List of most powerful locomotives =

As railroads around the world haul larger quantities of freight efficiently, the title of "world's most powerful locomotive" has often been passed to new generations of locomotives.

== Standard ==
There are many ways in which a locomotive can be the largest: the heaviest, longest, most cylinders, most power, or most wheels. It is often defined as the longest in length, but even then sources differ on whether the measurement should include the tender of a steam locomotive. A steam locomotive that has a tender cannot function without it, but (with rare exceptions) the tender does not contribute to traction. To establish the "largest" category, several factors take precedence: overall weight, which gives traction over driving axles; size (length and height of engine itself); and power, which may be in terms of raw horsepower, tractive effort, available power at axles (shaft horsepower) or, in the case of steam locomotives, available steam on a sustained basis.

== List ==
=== Steam Locomotives ===
Name	Original owner	Fleet numbers	Manufacturer	Year of manufacture	Drive type	Wheel arrangement	Weight	Tractive effort/force	Power	Notes	Image
2-10-10-2	Santa Fe and Virginian Railway	3000-3009 (Santa Fe) 800-809 (Virginian)	Baldwin Locomotive Works (Santa Fe); American Locomotive Company (Virginian)	1911-1912, 1918	Steam	2-10-10-2	415 tonnes (457 short tons)	778 kilonewtons (175,000 lbf) simple; 655 kilonewtons (147,200 lbf) compound	—N/a	Weight and performance figures listed for the Virginian variant, as that locomotive was the heavier and more powerful of the two.	
AA20	Soviet Railways	—N/a	Voroshilovgrad	1934	Steam	4-14-4	140 tonnes (154 short tons)	320 kilonewtons (71,940 lbf)	2,723 kilowatts (3,652 hp)	Largest non-articulated steam locomotive, and the only seven-axle non-articulated steam locomotive ever built.	
AD60 class	New South Wales Government Railways	6001-6042	Beyer, Peacock & Company	1952–1954, 1956	Steam	4-8-4+4-8-4	255 tonnes (281 short tons)	265 kilonewtons (59,575 lbf)	4,422 kilowatts (5,930 hp)	Largest steam locomotive ever operated in Australia	
H-8 Allegheny	Chesapeake & Ohio Railway; Virginian Railway	1600-1659 (C&O), 900-907 (VGN)	Lima Locomotive Works	1941–48	Steam	2-6-6-6	544 tonnes (600 short tons)	489 kilonewtons (110,000 lbf)	5,593 kilowatts (7,500 hp)	Two on static display	
4884-1 Big Boy	Union Pacific	4000-4019	ALCO	1941	Steam	4-8-8-4	540 tonnes (595 short tons)	602 kilonewtons (135,375 lbf)	4,690 kilowatts (6,290 hp)	Several on static display. No. 4014 in service with the UP Heritage Steam collection	
4884-2 Big Boy	Union Pacific	4020-4024	ALCO	1944	Steam	4-8-8-4	548 tonnes (604 short tons)			No. 4023 on static display.	
Challenger	Union Pacific	3950-3999	ALCO	1936–43	Steam	4-6-6-4	485 tonnes (535 short tons)	433 kilonewtons (97,350 lbf)	3,728 kilowatts (5,000 hp)	Two locomotives preserved, one on static display. Union Pacific 3985 operated for company PR and occasional excursion service from 1981 to 2010. Donated to Railroading Heritage of Midwest America in April 2022	
Erie Class P-1	Erie Railroad	2603-2605, later 5014-5016	Baldwin Locomotive Works	1914-1916	Steam	2-8-8-8-2	531 tonnes (585 short tons)	784 kilonewtons (176,256 lbf)	—N/a	Maximum speed approx. 10 mph.	
H class	Victorian Railways	H220	Newport Workshops	1941–1958	Steam	4-8-4	265 tonnes (292 short tons)	245 kilonewtons (55,060 lbf)	2,685 kilowatts (3,600 hp)	The most powerful steam locomotive built in Australia at the time. Only one was constructed, preserved at the Australian Railway Historical Society Museum.	
N&W; Jawn Henry	Norfolk & Western	2300	Baldwin Locomotive Works	1954-58	Steam turbine electric	C+C-C+C	404 tonnes (445 short tons)	778 kilonewtons (175,000 lbf)	3,356 kilowatts (4,500 hp)	Struck from the N&W roster on January 4, 1958.	
C&O M-1	Chesapeake and Ohio Railway	500-502	Baldwin Locomotive Works	1947–50	Steam turbine electric	2-C1-2-C1-B (4-8-0-4-8-4)	428 tonnes (472 short tons)	436 kilonewtons (98,000 lbf)	4,474 kilowatts (6,000 hp) turbine; 3,699 kilowatts (4,960 hp) generators	Nicknamed "Sacred Cows". Sold back to Baldwin in 1950 and scrapped.	
Class M-137	Western Pacific Railroad	251-260	Baldwin Locomotive Works	1931, 1938	Steam	2-8-8-2	487 tonnes (537 short tons)	610 kilonewtons (137,174 lbf)	—N/a	Largest steam locomotives owned by Western Pacific.	
Norfolk & Western Y Class	Norfolk & Western	—N/a	Roanoke Shops	1940s	Steam	2-8-8-2	449 tonnes (495 short tons)	738 kilonewtons (166,000 lbf)	4,176 kilowatts (5,600 hp)	Norfolk and Western 2156 is strongest-pulling steam locomotive still in existence.	
PRR Q2	Pennsylvania Railroad	6131, 6175-6199	Altoona Works	1941–45	Steam	4-4-6-4	456 tonnes (503 short tons)	515 kilonewtons (115,816 lbf) with booster	5,956 kilowatts (7,987 hp)	Most powerful steam locomotive ever static tested.	
PRR S1	Pennsylvania Railroad	6100	Altoona Works	1939	Steam	6-4-4-6	487 tonnes (537 short tons)	340 kilonewtons (76,403 lbf)	5,369 kilowatts (7,200 hp)	Fast passenger steam locomotive; the magazine Popular Mechanics cites 1941 a speed of 133.4 mph (214.7 km/h)	
PRR S2	Pennsylvania Railroad	6200	Baldwin Locomotive Works	1944	Steam turbine direct-drive	6-8-6	470 tonnes (518 short tons)	314 kilonewtons (70,500 lbf)	5,145 kilowatts (6,900 hp)	Most powerful steam turbine locomotive ever built.	
Union Pacific 9000 class	Union Pacific	9000-9087	American Locomotive Company	1926-1930	Steam	4-12-2	355 tonnes (391 short tons)	434 kilonewtons (97,664 lbf)	3,542 kilowatts (4,750 hp)	—N/a	
XA Triplex	Virginian Railway	700	Baldwin	1916	Steam	2-8-8-8-4	532 tonnes (586 short tons)	741 kilonewtons (166,600 lbf) compound	—N/a	Rebuilt into separate locomotives; Maximum speed approx. 10 mph.	
Yellowstone	Northern Pacific, Duluth, Missabe & Iron Range Railway and Baltimore & Ohio	220-237 (DM&IR)	Baldwin Locomotive Works	1928-1945	Steam	2-8-8-4	566 tonnes (624 short tons)	623 kilonewtons (140,093 lbf)	4,661 kilowatts (6,250 hp)	Figures are for the DM&IR Yellowstones, the largest and generally the most well-known of their type.	

=== Electric Locomotives ===
(Note: This list also includes battery-electric locomotives.)

Name	Original Owner	Fleet numbers	Manufacturer	Year of manufacture	Drive type	Wheel arrangement	Weight	Tractive effort/force	Power	Notes	Image
Russian Railways; 3ES10 (Note: Informal name, actually called 2ES10 (with 2ES10S unit))	Russian Railways	—N/a	Ural Locomotives	2014–Present	Electric	Bo'Bo'+Bo'Bo'+Bo'Bo'	300 tonnes (331 short tons)	1,176 kN (264,375 lbf)	13,200 kW (17,701 hp) (1-hour rating)	Three sections modification of 2ES10.	
Russian Railways; 4ES5K	Russian Railways	—N/a	Novocherkassk Electric Locomotive Plant	2014–Present	Electric	Bo'Bo'+Bo'Bo'+Bo'Bo'+Bo'Bo'	392 tonnes (432 short tons)	1,356 kN (304,840 lbf)	13,120 kW (17,594 hp) (1-hour rating)	Four sections modification of E5K.	
060-EA	Romanian Railways (CFR) (Note: Also includes numerous private railways in Romania and Hungary.)	—N/a	ASEA (first ten); Electroputere Craiova (the rest, approx. 1,000)	1965-91	Electric	Co'Co'	120 tonnes (132 short tons)	414 kN (93,000 lbf)	5,100 kW (6,839 hp)	Powerful locomotive in the 1970s; high continuous tractive effort.	
Ae 6/6	Swiss Federal Railways	11401-11520	SLM, MFO/BBC	1952; 1955–66	Electric	Co'Co'	120 tonnes (132 short tons)	392 kilonewtons (88,125 lbf)	4,300 kilowatts (5,766 hp) continuous	Still in operation as of October 2012	
Ae 6/8	BLS, Switzerland	201-208	SLM / Sécheron	1939	Electric	(1'Co)(Co1')	140 tonnes (154 short tons)	353 kilonewtons (79,360 lbf)	4,410 kilowatts (5,914 hp) 1-hour rating	Two remain in working order as heritage locos	
Ae 8/8	BLS, Switzerland	271-275	SLM / BBC	1959-66	Electric	(Bo)(Bo)+(Bo)(Bo)	160 tonnes (176 short tons)	451 kilonewtons (101,413 lbf) starting; 304 kilonewtons (68,343 lbf) 1-hour rating	6,472 kilowatts (8,680 hp) 1-hour rating	One preserved in working order.	
Ae 8/14	Swiss Federal Railways	11852	SLM, MFO/BBC	1939	Electric	(1'A)A1'A(A1')+(1'A)A1'A(A1')	236 tonnes (260 short tons)	490 kilonewtons (110,160 lbf)	8,162 kilowatts (10,945 hp) 1-hour rating; 7,647 kilowatts (10,255 hp) continuous	Exhibit at Swiss Museum of Transport	
China Railways HXD1	China Railway	HXD10001 - HXD10220	CSR Zhuzhou Electric Locomotive, Siemens	2006–08	Electric	Bo'Bo'+Bo'Bo'	200 tonnes (220 short tons)	760 kilonewtons (170,855 lbf) starting	9,600 kilowatts (12,874 hp) continuous	—N/a	
China Railways HXD1B	China Railway	HXD1B0001-HXD1B0500	CSR Zhuzhou Electric Locomotive, Siemens	2009–	Electric	Co'Co'	150 tonnes (165 short tons)	—N/a	9,600 kilowatts (12,874 hp)	One of the most powerful single-frame locomotives currently in series production.	
China Railways HXD1C	China Railway	HXD1C0001-HXD1C0990	CSR Zhuzhou Electric Locomotive, Siemens	2009–	Electric	Co'Co'	150 tonnes (165 short tons)	570 kilonewtons (128,141 lbf) starting	7,200 kilowatts (9,655 hp)	One of the most produced single-frame locomotives over 6,000 kW.	
China Railways HXD2	China Railway	HXD20001-HXD20180	Datong Electric Locomotive, Alstom	2006–08	Electric	Bo'Bo'+Bo'Bo'	200 tonnes (220 short tons)	760 kilonewtons (170,855 lbf) starting	10,000 kilowatts (13,410 hp) continuous	—N/a	
China Railways HXD2B	China Railway	HXD2B0001-HXD2B0500	Datong Electric Locomotive, Alstom	2009–	Electric	Co'Co'	150 tonnes (165 short tons)	584 kilonewtons (131,288 lbf) starting; 455 kilonewtons (102,288 lbf) continuous	9,600 kilowatts (12,874 hp)	One of the most powerful single-frame locomotives currently in series production.	
China Railways HXD2C	China Railway	HXD2C0001-	Datong Electric Locomotive, Alstom	2010–	Electric	Co'Co'	150 tonnes (165 short tons)	570 kilonewtons (128,141 lbf) starting; 400 kilonewtons (89,924 lbf) continuous	7,200 kilowatts (9,655 hp)	—N/a	
China Railways HXD3	China Railway	HXD30001-HXD30890, HXD38001-38150	Toshiba, Dalian Locomotive	2006–09	Electric	Co'Co'	150 tonnes (165 short tons)	570 kilonewtons (128,141 lbf)	7,200 kilowatts (9,655 hp)	—N/a	
China Railways HXD3B	China Railway	HXD3B0001-HXD3B0500	Dalian, Bombardier	2009–	Electric	Co'Co'	150 tonnes (165 short tons)	570 kilonewtons (128,141 lbf) starting; 506 kilonewtons (113,753 lbf)	9,600 kilowatts (12,874 hp) 1-hour rating	One of the most powerful single-frame locomotives currently in series production.	
China Railways HXD3C(A)	China Railway	HXD3C0001- HXD3CA6001-	Dalian, Bombardier	2010–	Electric	Co'Co'	150 tonnes (165 short tons)	570 kilonewtons (128,141 lbf) starting; 400 kilonewtons (89,924 lbf) continuous	7,200 kilowatts (9,655 hp)	One of the most produced single-frame locomotives over 6,000 kW.	
China Railways SS4	China Railway										
DB Class 101	Deutsche Bahn	101 001-145	Adtranz	1996–99	Electric	Bo'Bo'	83 tonnes (91 short tons)	300 kilonewtons (67,443 lbf)	6,400 kilowatts (8,583 hp) continuous	Maximum speed 220 km/h (137 mph).	
DB Class 103	Deutsche Bahn	103 101-245	AEG, Brown, Boveri & Cie, Henschel, KraussMaffei, Krupp, Siemens	1970–73	Electric	Co'Co'	114 tonnes (126 short tons)	312 kilonewtons (70,140 lbf)	12,133 kilowatts (16,270 hp) or 10,365 kilowatts (13,900 hp) short term; 7,780 kilowatts (10,433 hp) 1-hour rating; 7,440 kilowatts (9,977 hp) continuous rating	One of the most powerful electric locomotives ever built, it also is the most powerful (short term) single-frame locomotive ever built (currently its maximum short term power is limited to 9,000 kilowatts (12,069 hp); It has immense short term power with a tractive effort of 312 kN up to a speed of 140 km/h (87 mph).	
DB Class 151	Deutsche Bahn	151 001-170	AEG, BBC, Henschel, KraussMaffei, Krupp, Siemens	1972–78	Electric	Co'Co'	118 tonnes (130 short tons)	395 kilonewtons (88,800 lbf)	6,288 kilowatts (8,432 hp)	Powerful freight locomotive in the 1970s with high continuous tractive effort.	
DSB EG	DB Schenker Rail	3103-3113	Siemens	1999–2000	Electric	Co'Co'	132 tonnes (146 short tons)	400 kilonewtons (89,924 lbf)	6,500 kilowatts (8,717 hp) continuous	One of the most powerful single-frame electric locomotives in operation in Europe in the 2000s; surpassed by Euro 9000.	
EuroSprinter	Deutsche Bahn, ÖBB	—N/a	KraussMaffei, Siemens	1996–Present	Electric	Bo'Bo'	86 tonnes (95 short tons)	300 kilonewtons (67,443 lbf)	7,300 kilowatts (9,790 hp) short term; 6,400 kilowatts (8,583 hp) continuous	Maximum speed 230 km/h (143 mph); On 2 September 2006, Taurus Rh 1216 050-5 holds the world speed record for conventional electric locomotives at 357 km/h (222 mph).	
Eurotunnel Class 9	Getlink	9000	Euroshuttle Locomotive Consortium	1993-2002	Electric	Bo-Bo-Bo	132 tonnes (146 short tons)	400 kilonewtons (89,924 lbf) starting; 310 kilonewtons (69,691 lbf) continuous	7,000 kilowatts (9,387 hp)	Always used in pairs (one at each end of the train). Early versions were 5,600 kilowatts (7,510 hp) but most have been rebuilt to 7 MW.	
JŽ Class 461	Železnice Srbije, Serbia	ŽS461-0/1, ŽS461-2	Electroputere Craiova, Romania	1965–91	Electric	Co'Co'	120 tonnes (132 short tons)	392 kilonewtons (88,125 lbf)	5,696 kilowatts (7,638 hp)		
Indian locomotive class WAG-7	Indian Railways	27001–27999, 28000–28770, 24501-24700	Chittaranjan Locomotive Works, India, BHEL, India	1992	Electric	Co'Co'	132 tonnes (146 short tons)	601 kilonewtons (135,000 lbf)	3,989 kilowatts (5,350 hp)	The WAG-7 is one of the most successful locomotives of Indian Railways currently serving both freight and passenger trains for over 31 years	
Indian locomotive class WAG-9	Indian Railways		Chittaranjan Locomotive Works, Electric Locomotive Works, Bhusawal	1996–	Electric	Co'Co'	123 tonnes (136 short tons)	445 kilonewtons (100,000 lbf); 325 kilonewtons (73,000 lbf) continuous	4,922 kilowatts (6,600 hp)	WAG-9 has quickly become one of the important locos in the Indian railways.	
Indian locomotive class WAG-9H	Indian Railways		Chittaranjan Locomotive Works, Electric Locomotive Works, Bhusawal	2000–	Electric	Co'Co'	132 tonnes (146 short tons)	534 kilonewtons (120,000 lbf); Continuous:325 kilonewtons (73,000 lbf)	4,922 kilowatts (6,600 hp)	The WAG-9 locomotive is referred to as the "Heavy Haul" freight locomotive of the Indian Railways	
Indian locomotive class WAG-9HH	Indian Railways	90001+	Chittaranjan Locomotive Works, India	2019-	Electric	Co'Co'	135 tonnes (149 short tons)		6,711 kilowatts (9,000 hp)	A passenger variant of the WAG-9 was developed namely the WAP-7 locomotive by modifying the gear ratio to pull lighter loads at higher speeds.	
Indian locomotive class WAG-11	Indian Railways	29001+	Banaras Locomotive Works Varanasi	2018–Present	Electric	Co'Co'+Co'Co'			8,948 kilowatts (12,000 hp)	India's Indigenously developed 12000hp electric loco.	
Indian locomotive class WAG-12	Indian Railways	WAG12B60001+ onward	ELF Madhepura	2018–present	Electric	Bo'Bo'+Bo'Bo'	180 tonnes (198 short tons) Up-gradable to 200 tonnes (220 short tons)	785 kilonewtons (176,475 lbf) starting	8,948 kilowatts (12,000 hp)		
JR Freight Class EF200	JR Freight	—N/a	Hitachi	1990–	Electric	Bo'Bo'Bo'	100.8 tonnes (111 short tons)	261 kilonewtons (58,643 lbf)	6,000 kilowatts (8,046 hp)	Most powerful single-frame narrow-gauge locomotive in series production.	
Korail Class 8500	Korail	8501-8587	Hyundai Rotem	2012-2014	Electric	Co'Co'	132 tonnes (146 short tons)	450 kilonewtons (101,164 lbf)	6,600 kilowatts (8,851 hp)		
Milwaukee Road; Little Joe	Milwaukee Road	EF-4 and EP-4	General Electric	1950-80	Electric	2-D+D-2	247.5 tonnes (273 short tons)	337 kilonewtons (75,700 lbf)	3,811 kilowatts (5,110 hp)	Maximum speed of 68 mph, used for freight and passenger.	
MTAB Iore	MTAB	IORE 101 - 126	Bombardier	2000–04	Electric	Co'Co'+Co'Co'	360 tonnes (397 short tons)	1,400 kN (314,732 lbf)	10,800 kW (14,483 hp) continuous rating (for a pair)	The most powerful double-frame locomotive in series built. It is possible to operate individual halves, however it is not usually done.	
PRR GG1	Pennsylvania Railroad (Note: Later used by Penn Central, Conrail, Amtrak and NJ Transit.)	4800–4938, 900-929	Altoona Works, General Electric	1934–43	Electric	2-C+C-2 (4-6-6-4)	216.4 tonnes (239 short tons)	291 kilonewtons (65,500 lbf)	3,452 kilowatts (4,629 hp)	Most scrapped; the prototype and 15 production locomotives have been preserved in museums.	
Re 4/4	BLS, Switzerland	Re 425 161-Re 425 195)	SLM / BBC	1964-83	Electric	Bo'Bo'	80 tonnes (88 short tons)	314 kilonewtons (70,548 lbf)	4,980 kilowatts (6,678 hp) 1-hour rating	Out of operation as of August 2026	
Re 465	BLS, Switzerland	Re 465 001-465 0018	SLM, ABB	1994-97	Electric	Bo'Bo'	84 tonnes (93 short tons)	320 kilonewtons (71,940 lbf)	7,002 kilowatts (9,390 hp) short term 6,271 kilowatts (8,410 hp) continuous;	Similar locomotives with slightly different technical data are in operation with SBB (Re 460; 119 pc/NSB (El 18; 22 pc)/VR (Sr2; 46 pc)/KCRC (Hong Kong; 2 pc).	
Re 6/6	SBB, Switzerland	11601-11689	SLM, MFO/BBC/Sécheron	1972, 1975–80	Electric	Bo'Bo'Bo'	120 tonnes (132 short tons)	394 kilonewtons (88,626 lbf)	7,796 kilowatts (10,455 hp) 1-hour rating 7,240 kilowatts (9,708 hp) continuous	At the time of construction (1972) one of the world's most powerful locomotives. Currently in operation as of May 2022 with the revised classification of Re 620.	
Shen 12	Shenhua Mining Group	HXD1.7	CRRC Zhuzhou		Electric	3×Bo'Bo'	276 tonnes (304 short tons)	1,140 kilonewtons (256,282 lbf) starting	14,400 kilowatts (19,311 hp) continuous rating	Three-section modification of the HXD1.	
Shen 24	Shenhua Mining Group		CRRC Zhuzhou	2020–present	Electric	6×Bo'Bo'		2,280 kilonewtons (512,564 lbf)	28,800 kilowatts (38,621 hp)	Six-section modification of HXD1, 106 metres (348 ft) long overall.	
SJ Dm3	SJ	—N/a	ASEA	1953–71	Electric	1'D+D+D1'	273 tonnes (301 short tons)	940 kilonewtons (211,320 lbf)	7,200 kilowatts (9,655 hp)	Highest continuous tractive effort when built, most powerful locomotive using jackshafts.	
Softronic Transmontana	Romanian Railways (CFR)	480 (Romania) 610 (Hungary)	Softronic Craiova	2010–present	Electric	Co'Co'	120 tonnes (132 short tons)	435 kilonewtons (97,800 lbf)	6,600 kilowatts (8,851 hp) 1-hour rating; 6,000 kilowatts (8,046 hp) continuous	Based on the ASEA 060-EA, but with asynchronous traction motors, IGBT and computerized control.	
Virginian Railway EL-3A	Virginian Railway	100-109	ALCO + Westinghouse	1925-1926	Electric	1-D-1+1-D-1+1-D-1	624 tonnes (688 short tons)	1,234 kilonewtons (277,500 lbf)	5,313 kilowatts (7,125 hp) (1-hour rating); 4,474 kilowatts (6,000 hp) continuous	152.25 feet (46 m) overall length.	
Russian Railways; VL85 (Note: Russian: ВЛ85)	Russian Railways	270	Novocherkassk Electric Locomotive Plant	1983-94	Electric	Bo'Bo'Bo'+Bo'Bo'Bo'	300 tonnes (331 short tons)	932 kilonewtons (209,522 lbf)	9,359 kilowatts (12,550 hp) continuous; 10,020 kilowatts (13,437 hp) short term	—N/a	

=== Diesel locomotives ===
Name	Original Owner	Fleet numbers	Manufacturer	Year	Drive type	Wheel arrangement	Weight	Tractive effort	Power	Notes	Image
China Railway; DF8BJ	Qinghai Railway	LRMG-001 to LRMG-010	CRRC Ziyang	2024	Diesel-electric	Co'Co'		Starting: 440 kN (99,000 lbf); Continuous: 347 kN (78,000 lbf)	3,680 kW (4,935 hp)	Figures listed for the narrow-gauge version exported to Sierra Leone.	
China Railway; DF8DJ	China Railway	DF8DJ0001, later DF8B5672	CSR Ziyang	2006	Diesel-electric	Co'Co'	150 tonnes (165 short tons)	Starting: 580 kN (130,389 lbf); Continuous: 440 kN (98,916 lbf)	4,800 kW (6,437 hp)	Most powerful single-engine diesel locomotive ever built.	
China Railway; EQJ1	China Railway	北京6001	Beijing Feb. 7th	1969	Diesel-hydraulic	D'D'	183.5 tonnes (202.3 short tons)	Starting: 595 kN (133,821 lbf); Continuous: 420 kN (94,358 lbf)	4,474 kW (6,000 hp) (Note: 4,027 kW (5,400 hp) in actual service.)	Most powerful diesel-hydraulic locomotive ever built.	
China Railway; HXN3	China Railway	HXN30001 - HXN30300	EMD–Dalian	2008–2014	Diesel-Electric	Co'Co'	150 tonnes (165 short tons)	Starting: 620 kN (139,382 lbf); Continuous: 598 kN (134,436 lbf)	4,660 kW (6,249 hp)		
China Railway; HXN5	China Railway	HXN50001 - HXN50300	GE–Qishuyan	2008–2010	Diesel-Electric	Co'Co'	150 tonnes (165 short tons)	Starting: 623 kN (140,000 lbf); Continuous: 565 kN (127,000 lbf)	4,661 kW (6,250 hp)		
EMD DDA40X	Union Pacific	6900-6946	Electro-Motive Diesel	1969–71	Diesel-electric	Do'Do'	244 tonnes (269 short tons)	507 kilonewtons (113,940 lbf) starting; 458 kilonewtons (103,000 lbf) continuous	4,922 kW (6,600 hp)	One operational, 13 in various museums.	
EMD SD70ACe-T4	UP; BNSF; CSX	3000-3099 (Union Pacific)	Electro-Motive Diesel (EMD)	2015–present	Diesel-electric	Co'Co'	194 tonnes (214 short tons)	890 kilonewtons (200,000 lbf) starting 778 kilonewtons (175,000 lbf) continuous	3,281 kW (4,400 hp)	—N/a	
EMD SD90MAC	Union Pacific	8500-8561	Electro-Motive Diesel	1996–2002	Diesel-electric	Co'Co'	193 tonnes (213 short tons)	890 kilonewtons (200,000 lbf) starting; 734 kilonewtons (165,000 lbf) continuous	4,698 kW (6,300 hp)	Retired from service, some on lease with EMLX.	
GE AC6000CW	Union Pacific; CSX; BHP	600–699, 5000–5016, 6070–6077, 7500-7579 (being overhauled and renumbered 69xx)	General Electric	1996–2001	Diesel-electric	Co'Co'	196 tonnes (216 short tons)	836 kilonewtons (188,000 lbf) starting; 738 kilonewtons (166,000 lbf) continuous	4,661 kW (6,250 hp)	Actual HP output on early production units is 4,350 hp due to use of the 7FDL engine.	
MPXpress MP54AC	GO Transit	667-682	MotivePower Industries	2017-2018	Diesel-electric	Bo'Bo'	127–132 tonnes (140–145 short tons)	369 kilonewtons (82,900 lbf) starting; 226 kilonewtons (50,700 lbf) continuous	4,027 kW (5,400 hp)	Highest power diesel passenger locomotive in North America.	
Voith Maxima	—N/a	—N/a	Voith	2006–14	Diesel-hydraulic	Co'Co'	135 tonnes (149 short tons)	408 kilonewtons (91,722 lbf)	3,600 kilowatts (4,828 hp) engine (Maxima 40CC)	Voith Maxima 40CC is the most powerful single-engine diesel-hydraulic locomotive ever built.	

=== Dual power systems ===
Name	Original owner	Fleet numbers	Manufacturer	Year	Drive type	Wheel arrangement	Weight	Tractive effort	Power		Notes	Image
Name	Original owner	Fleet numbers	Manufacturer	Year	Drive type	Wheel arrangement	Weight	Tractive effort	Primary	Secondary	Notes	Image
China Railways FXSY	China Railway		CRRC Zhuzhou		Electro-diesel	Co'Co'+Co'Co'			7,200 kW (9,655 hp) (Electric)	3,000 kW (4,023 hp) (Diesel)		
China Railways FXSY3	China Railway		CRRC Dalian		Electro-diesel	Co'Co'			7,200 kW (9,655 hp) (Electric)	3,000 kW (4,023 hp) (Diesel)		
Stadler EuroDual	—N/a	—N/a	Stadler Rail	2012	Dual power electro-diesel	Co'Co'	114–126 tonnes (126–139 short tons)	500 kN (112,500 lbf)	7,000 kW (9,387 hp) (Electric)			
Stadler Euro 9000	European Loc Pool	2019 302–	Stadler Rail	2020–	Dual power electro-diesel	Co'Co'	123 tonnes (136 short tons)	500 kN (112,404 lbf)	9,000 kW (12,069 hp) (Electric)		Most powerful (continuous) single-frame locomotive in Europe.	
British Rail; Class 99	GB Railfreight	99001–99030	Stadler Rail	2025–	Dual power electro-diesel	Co'Co'	113 tonnes (125 short tons)	500 kN (112,404 lbf)	6,170 kW (8,274 hp) (Electric)	1,790 kW (2,400 hp) (Diesel)	Based on the Stadler EuroDual platform. Replacement for the British Rail Class 66.	

=== Other power types ===
Name	Original owner	Fleet numbers	Manufacturer	Year	Drive type	Wheel arrangement	Weight	Tractive effort	Power	Notes	Image											
Name	Original owner	Fleet numbers	Manufacturer	Year	Drive type	Wheel arrangement	Weight	Tractive effort	Power	Notes	Image	Russian Railways; GT1	Russian Railways	—N/a	Sinara Group at Lyudinovsky Locomotive Plant	—N/a	Gas turbine-electric	—N/a	360 tonnes (397 short tons)	980 kN (220,313 lbf)	Turbine: 8,300 kW (11,130 hp)	Currently the most powerful non-electric locomotive ever produced.
Union Pacific; Coal GTELs	Union Pacific	80 (later 8080)	Union Pacific; Omaha Shops	1961	Diesel-electric + gas turbine-electric	A1A-A1A+2-D-D-2	661 tonnes (729 short tons)	—N/a	5,220 kW (7,000 hp) (2,000 hp Diesel + 5,000 hp turbine)	Home-built experimental coal-fired gas turbine. (Note: Assembled from ALCO PA-1 UP #607, GN W1 #5018, and the tender from Challenger #3990. 215 feet (66 m) overall length; 1,457,280 lb (661,011 kg) total weight.) Unsuccessful; set aside in 1964 and scrapped in 1968.												
Union Pacific; GTEL 3^{rd} generation "Big Blows"	Union Pacific	1-30 (control cab); 1B-30B (turbine unit)	General Electric	1958–1961	Gas turbine-electric	C-C+C-C	425 tonnes (468 short tons)	944 kN (212,312 lbf)	Turbine: 6,315 kW (8,469 hp) (Note: Over 7,457 kW (10,000 hp) at lower altitude and ambient temperatures.)	Two preserved in museums; surpassed by GT1s.												

== See also ==
- List of largest passenger vehicles
