= China Railways HXD2 =

Class of Chinese electric locomotives

HXD2 和谐2型电力机车
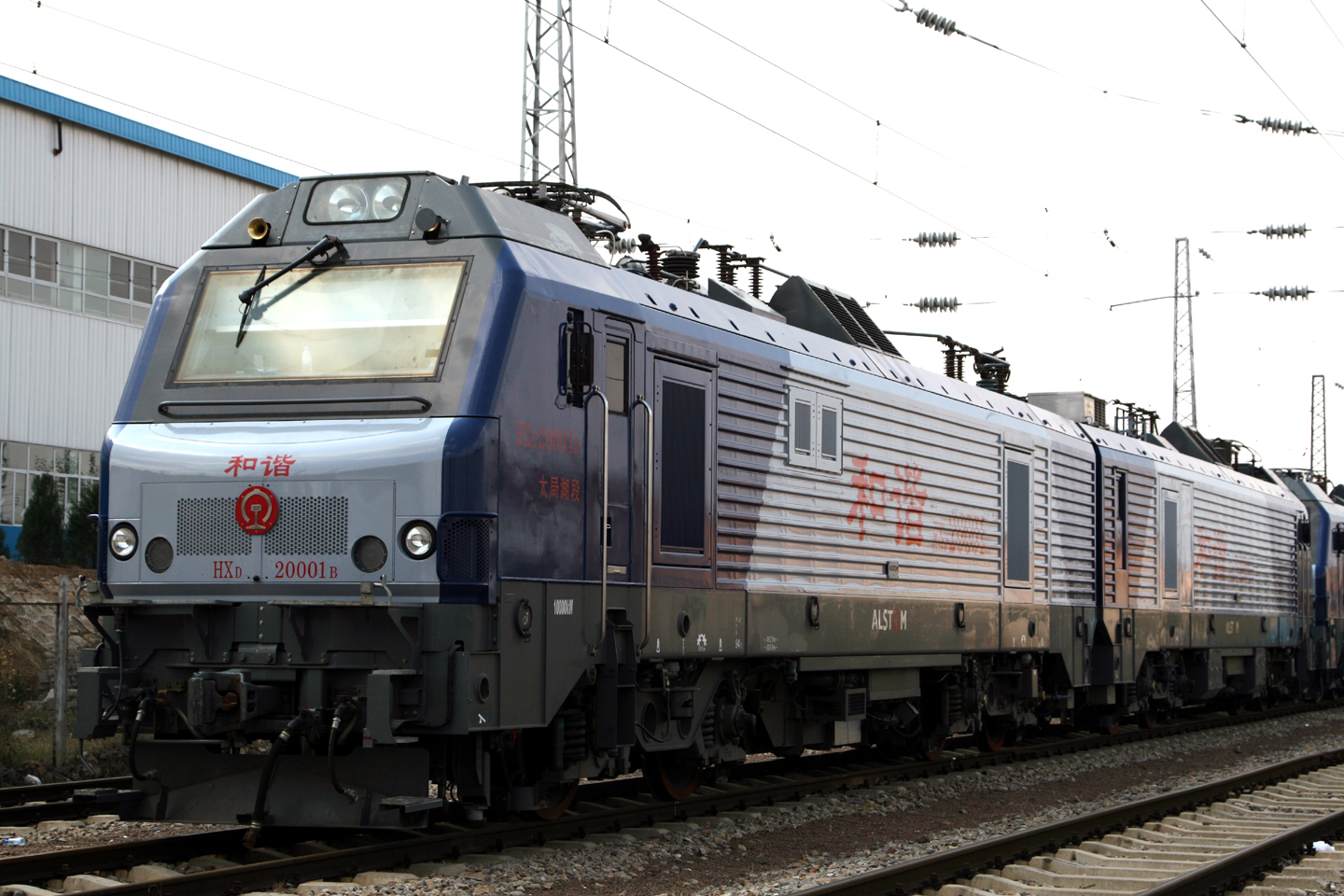
- HXD2-0001
Type and origin
- Power type: Electric
- Builder: Alstom (initially); CRRC Datong Electric Locomotive / Yongji Xinshisu Electric Equipment; ABB traction transformers
- Build date: 2007–2019
- Total produced: HXD2 : 180; HXD2.1 : 280; HXD2.6 : 40; HXD2.7 : 50; HXD2B : 500; HXD2C : 220; HXD2F : 2 (as of 2014)
Specifications
- Configuration
  - AAR: HXD2, HXD2F : 2(B-B); HXD2B, HXD2C: C-C
  - UIC: Bo′Bo′+Bo′Bo′; HXD2B, HXD2C: Co′Co′
- Gauge: 1,435 mm (4 ft 8 1/2 in)
- Minimum curve: 125 m (410 ft)
- Wheelbase: bogies : HXD2 : 2.600 m (8 ft 6.4 in); HXD2B, HXD2C : 2.250 m (7 ft 4.6 in) + 2.000 m (6 ft 6.7 in)
- Length: coupler distance : HXD2 : 2x19.025 m (62 ft 5.0 in); HXD2B, HXD2C : 22.960 m (75 ft 3.9 in)
- Width: 2.850 m (9 ft 4.2 in)
- Loco weight: HXD2: 2x92 t (91 long tons; 101 short tons) (200 t or 200 long tons or 220 short tons*); HXD2B: 150 t (150 long tons; 170 short tons); HXD2C: 138 t (136 long tons; 152 short tons) (150 t or 150 long tons or 170 short tons*); HXD2F : 216 t (213 long tons; 238 short tons) (240 tonnes*)
- Electric system/s: 25 kV 50 Hz AC Catenary
- Current pickup: Pantograph
- Loco brake: Pneumatic dynamic
- Train brakes: Pneumatic
Performance figures
- Maximum speed: 120 km/h (75 mph) (operation)
- Power output: HXD2 : 10 MW (13,000 hp); HXD2B : 9.6 MW (12,900 hp); HXD2C : 7.2 MW (9,700 hp); HXD2F : 9.6 MW (12,900 hp)
- Tractive effort: starting : HXD2: 760 kN (170,000 lb_{f})*, 700 kN (160,000 lb_{f}); HXD2B:584 kN (131,000 lb_{f}); HXD2C: 570 kN (130,000 lb_{f})*, 520 kN (120,000 lb_{f}) continuous: HXD2B:554 or 514 kN (125,000 or 116,000 lb_{f}) @65 or 70 km/h (40 or 43 mph) (25 or 23t axleoad); HXD2B:455 kN (102,000 lb_{f}) @76 km/h (47 mph); HXD2C : 400 or 370 kN (90,000 or 83,000 lb_{f}) @ 65 or 70 km/h (40 or 43 mph) (25 or 23 t or 25 or 23 long tons or 28 or 25 short tons axleload)
- Brakeforce: regenerative : HXD2 : 10MW max 473 kN (106,000 lb_{f}) max. HXD2B : 9.6 MW (12,900 hp) max 400 kN (90,000 lb_{f}) max HXD2C : 7.2 MW (9,700 hp) max approximately 400 kN (90,000 lb_{f}) max*.
Career
- Operators: China Railway
- Numbers: 0001–2047
- First run: December 4, 2007
- Preserved: Four
- Disposition: Four preserved
- When fully ballasted Sources: (except where noted) HXD2 HXD2B HXD2C HXD2F

The HXD2 (Chinese: 和谐2型电力机车) is an electric locomotive and a series of related locomotive classes built by CRRC Datong Electric Locomotive and Alstom. The locomotives designs are based on the Alstom Prima electric locomotives, and are a product of a cooperation agreement signed between the two companies in 2004. All locomotives are intended for heavy freight work, including coal trains on the Datong Qinhuangdao line (Daqin Railway).

The original HXD2 locomotives are twin unit Bo′Bo′+Bo′Bo′ vehicles whereas the HXD2B and HXD2C versions are single unit Co′Co′ machines. At the time of their construction the HXD2 and HXD2B locomotives were amongst the most powerful locomotives in the world. The HXD2C is similarly specified to the HXD2B but of reduced power, and with increased localisation of components for lower cost.

The HXD2 was originally described as the DJ4-6000 class.

Variants of the type were produced for railways other than China Railway: in 2010, Belarus state railways ordered a HXD2 twin unit locomotive variant (BCG-1); and in 2012, Shenhua Group also ordered twin section locomotives.

In 2012, CNR Datong announced a new sub-version of the HXD2 class, built using fully localised production; the HXD2-1000 series. In 2014, a new localised variant, in 2(Bo′Bo′) wheel arrangement and 9.6MW power, with axle load of 27tonnes (up to 30 tonnes on specialised line) was unveiled, designated HXD2F, and officially nicknamed 超级大力士(Super Strongman).

== Variants ==
=== HXD2 ===
The locomotives are designed for heavy haul freight applications (up to 7,000 t or 6,900 long tons or 7,700 short tons train weights), and to be capable of multiple working of three locomotives. The design is also specified for temperatures down to −40 °C (−40 °F).

The locomotive is ballasted to a 25 t (24.6 long tons; 27.6 short tons) axle load - a reduction to 23 t (22.6 long tons; 25.4 short tons) axle load with reduced starting tractive effort is optional.

An (€350 million) order for 180 locomotives was placed (2005), of which the initial 12 would be made in France, then 24 supplied for assembly, the remainder being produced in China. The locomotives are used primarily for coal transportation, specifically on the Datong - Qinhuangdao railway line.

The first China built locomotive was produced May 23, 2007.

In 2010 the locomotives began to be used on coal trains from Inner Mongolia.

Design

The main structural component is an integrated welded steel main bean and floor, with load bearing side sills. The side walls are of corrugated metal, and the roof of the locomotive is removable. The structure is designed for loads of 3,600 kN (810,000 lb_{f}) in tension and 2,500 kN (560,000 lb_{f}) in compression. The couplers are designed for up to 4,000 kN (900,000 lb_{f}) force.

The drivers cabins are designed for single driver operation. Driver facilities include a separate air-conditioned/heated area with refrigerator, cooking and washing facilities, and seating and beds.

The locomotives use asynchronous AC electric motor technology, which drives the axles by a nose suspended drive. The bogies are of welded steel construction, with tractive forces transmitted by a low mounted drawbar. The electrical system consists of a transformers based on ABB Group products with 4 windings for electric traction power supply per transformer. Traction inverters are IGBT semiconductor device based, and of the Alstom ONIX type - each traction motor has a separate inverter/rectifier electrical power system. Electrical power for auxiliary devices is supplied via IGBT converters powered from the same intermediate DC power supply used to power the traction motors. Computer control and monitoring systems are from the Alstom AGATE (Note: AGATE : Advanced Generic Alstom Transport Electronics) product range.

==== HXD2-1000 ====
In August 2012, CNR Datong announced the production of a new variant of its twin section, 8 axle, 10MW freight locomotive using domestically produced traction and control systems; the first unit was numbered HXD2-1001. The two first units have corrugated sides, following ones have smooth sides.

==== HXD2-6000 ====
From 2014, CNR Dalian delivered 40 HXD2 quite similar to series HXD2-1000.

==== HXD2-7000 ====
From 2012, CNR Datong delivered 50 HXD2 quite similar to both first HXD2-1000 at the operator Shenhua Mining. Minor differences in cabin form.

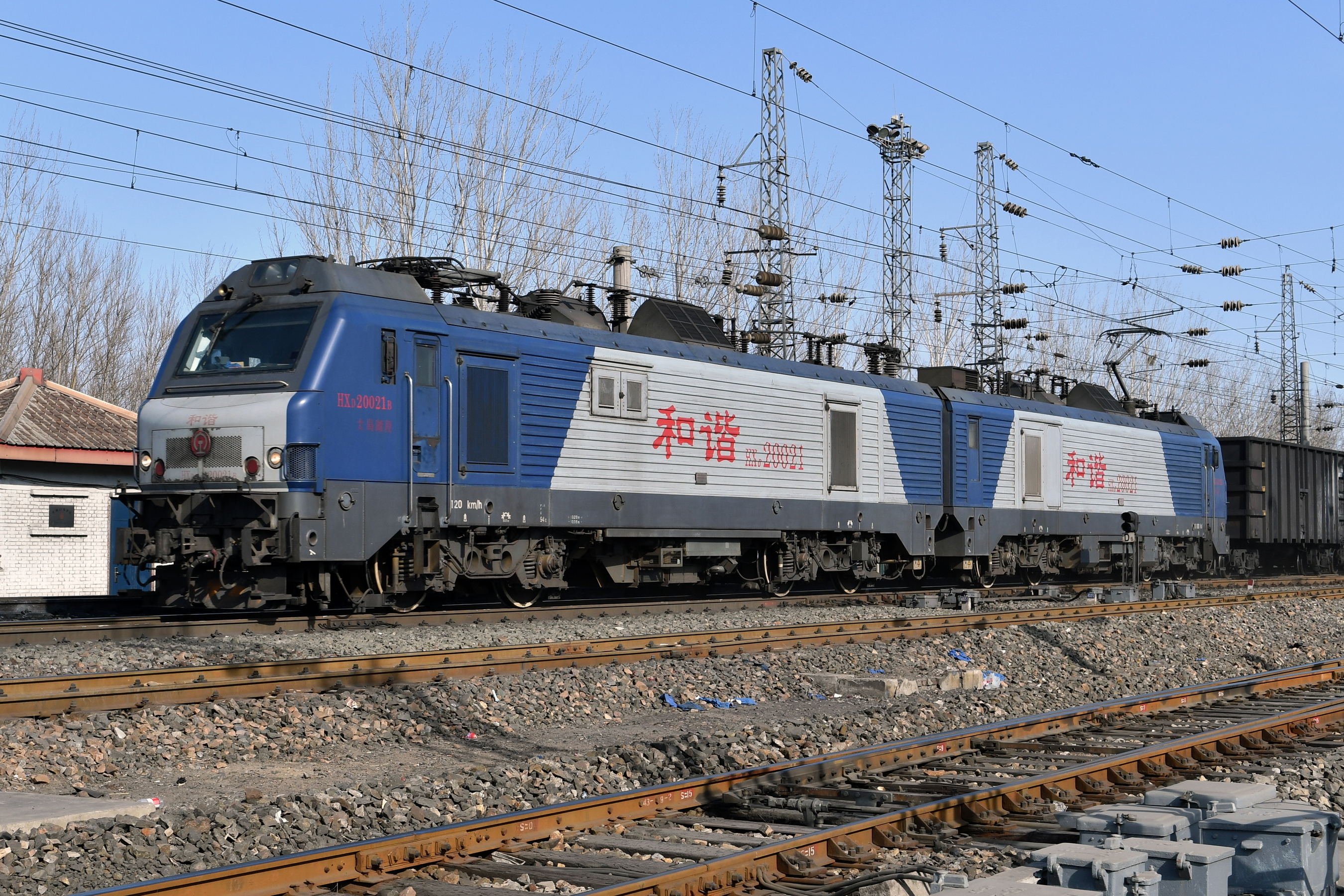
HXD2-0021 at Chawu Railway Station

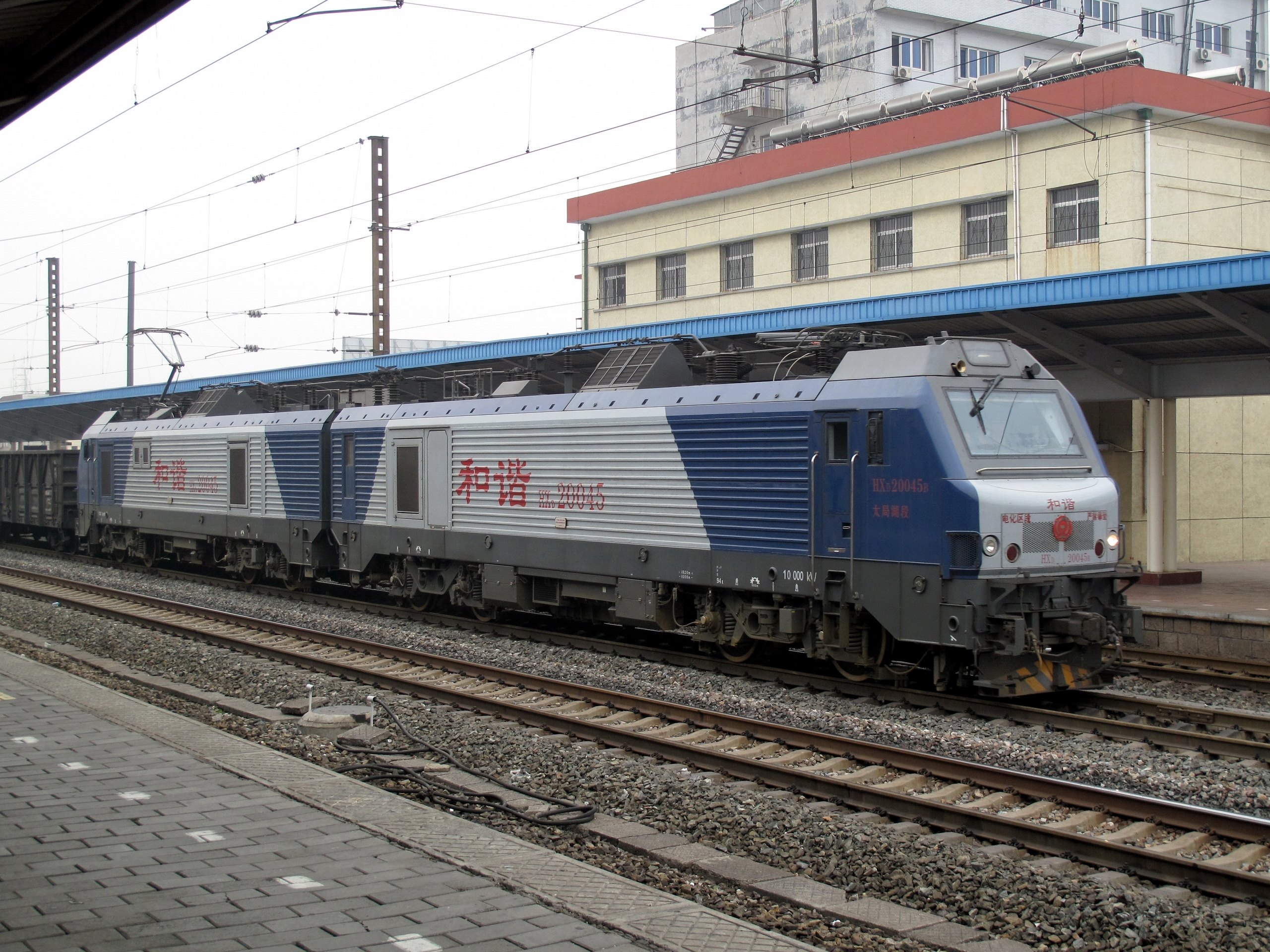
HXD2-0045 at Qinhuangdao Railway Station

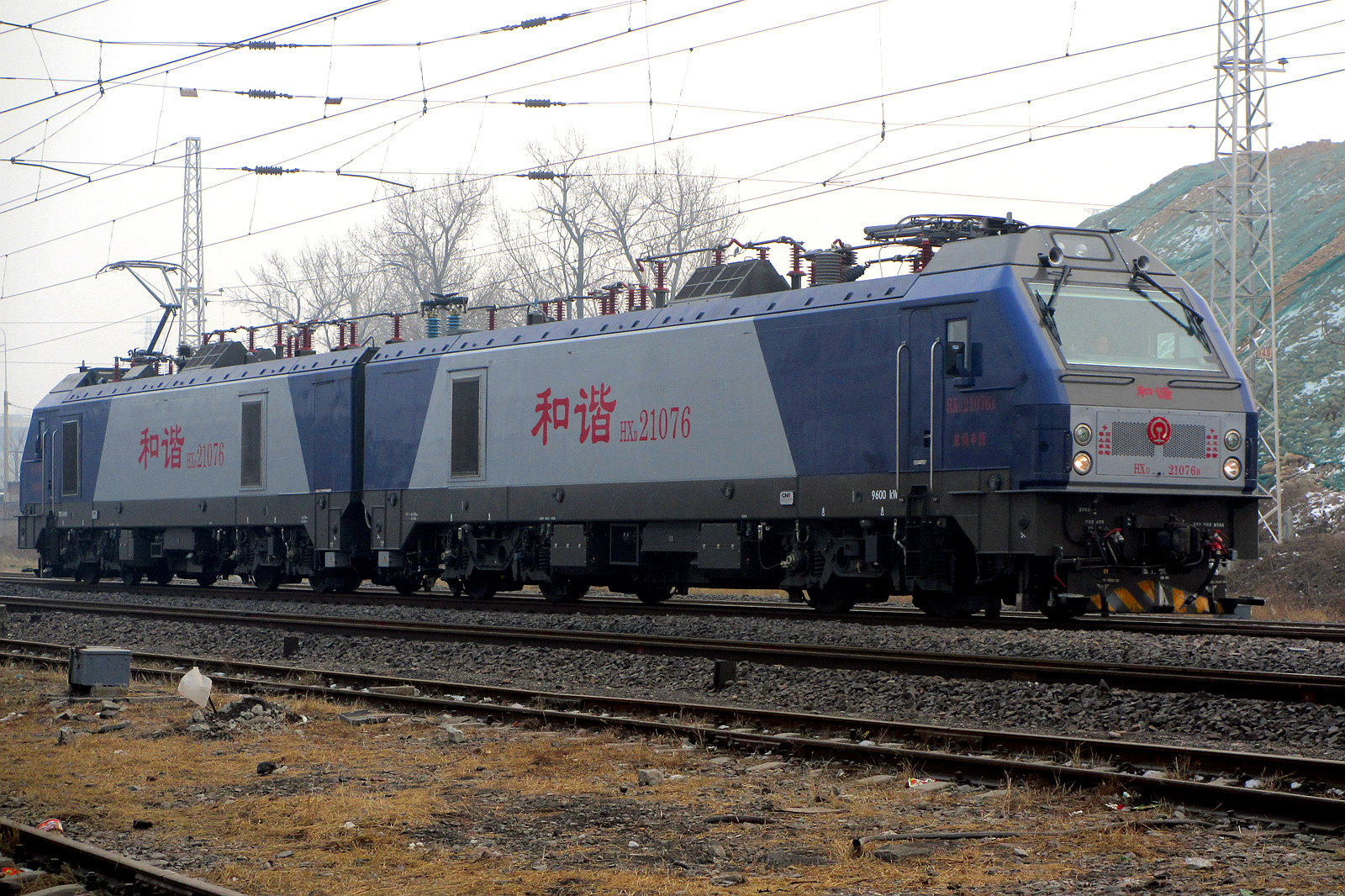
HXD2-1076 (1000 Series)

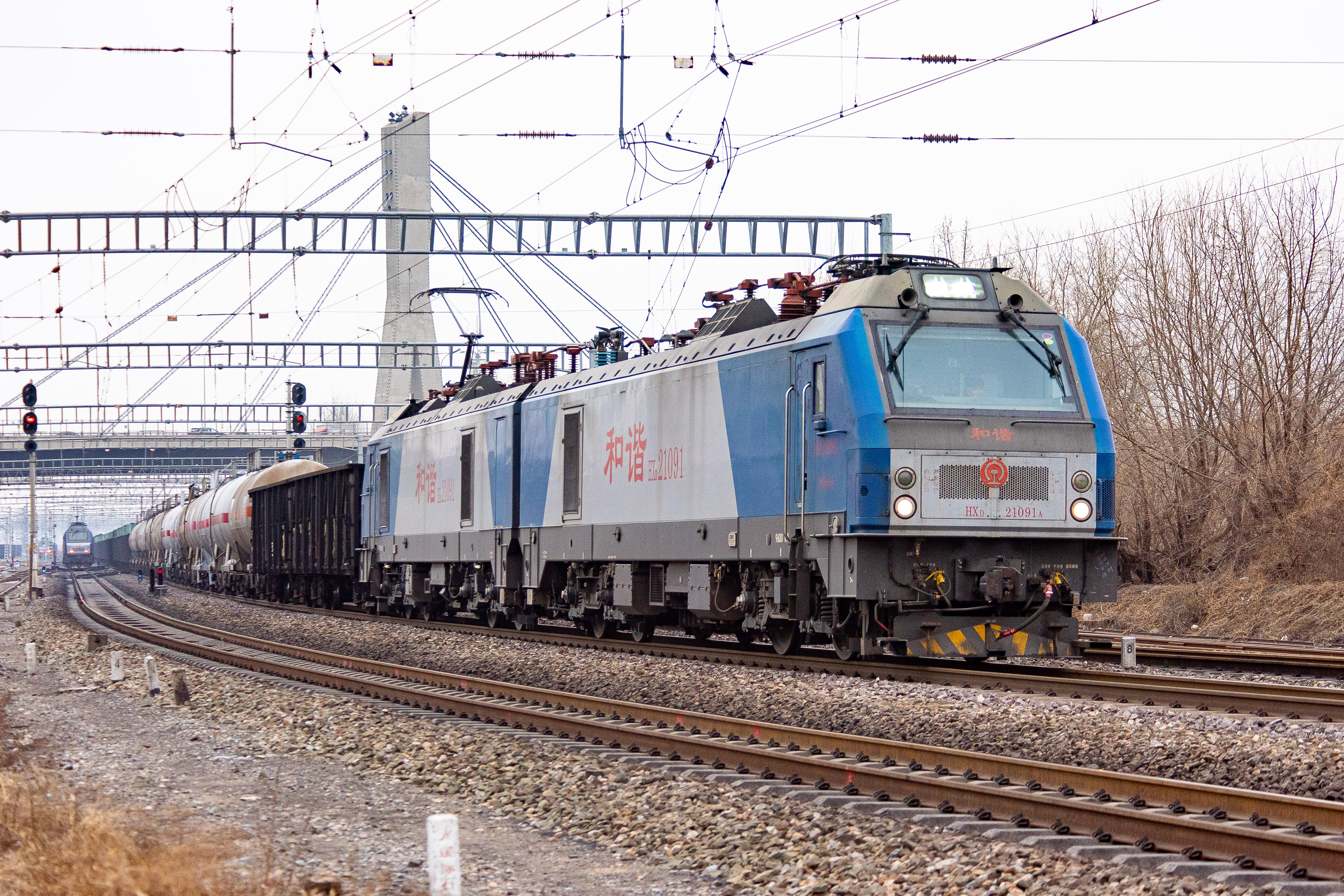
HXD2-1091 (1000 Series)

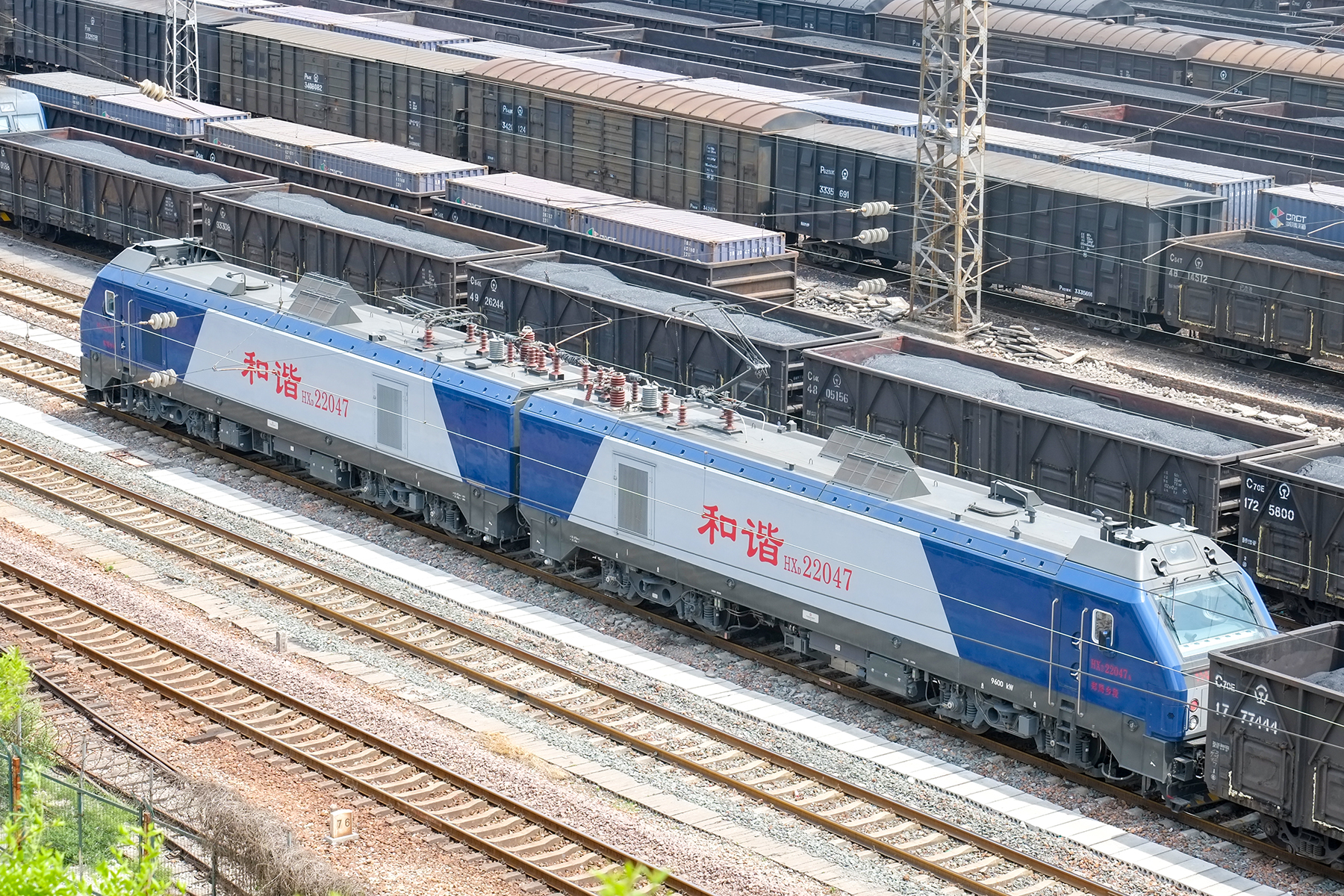
HXD2-2047 (2000 Series)

=== HXD2F ===
In April 2014, two indigenous two-unit (Bo′Bo′)-(Bo′Bo′) locomotives were unveiled by CNR Datong, nicknamed "超级大力士" (trans. 'Super hercules" or "Super strongman"). The locomotives had an axle load of 27–30 tonnes (27–30 long tons; 30–33 short tons) for higher tractive effort, with power output of 9.6 MW (12,900 hp).

=== HXD2G ===
In November 2015, two indigenous two-unit (Bo′Bo′)-(Bo′Bo′) locomotives were unveiled by CNR Datong. The locomotives had an axle load of 18 tonnes (18 long tons; 20 short tons) for higher speed, with continuous power output of 11.2 MW (15,000 hp). It is designed for 200 km/h, but first used until 160 km/h.

== Related orders ==
In October 2010 Belorusskaja Železnaja Doroga ordered 12 units of a derived variant of the HXD2 two-section locomotive, to be designated BCG-1.

In 2012 CNR Datong supplied the Chinese mining operation, Shenhua Group, with two 9.6 MW (12,900 hp), twin section, 120 kilometres per hour (75 mph), eight-axle locomotives, with traction equipment supplied by Bombardier. The locomotive type is derived from technology used in the 'Harmony' (HXD) series, and has been named "超级大力士", (literal: "Super Strongman").

== See also ==
- China Railways HXD2B
- China Railways HXD2C
- China Railways 8K, twin-unit locomotives produced by Alstom for China in the 1980s. see also 8K locomotive (Chinese language)
- Indian locomotive class WAG-12, Indian twin unit locomotives also developed by Alstom using the Prima model.
- List of locomotives in China
