= Valki railway station =

Belarusian Railways station

Valki

General information
- Location: Belarus
- Coordinates: 55°07′59″N 26°58′26″E
- Owner: Belarusian Railway

Other information
- Status: Closed
- Station code: 164319

History
- Opened: 1951
- Closed: 2011
Location
- Location within Belarus

Valki (Belarusian: Валькі) was a railway station in Vitebsk Region, Belarus. It was closed in 2011, demolished in 2013.
