= China Railways 8G =

Class of Chinese electric locomotives

8G
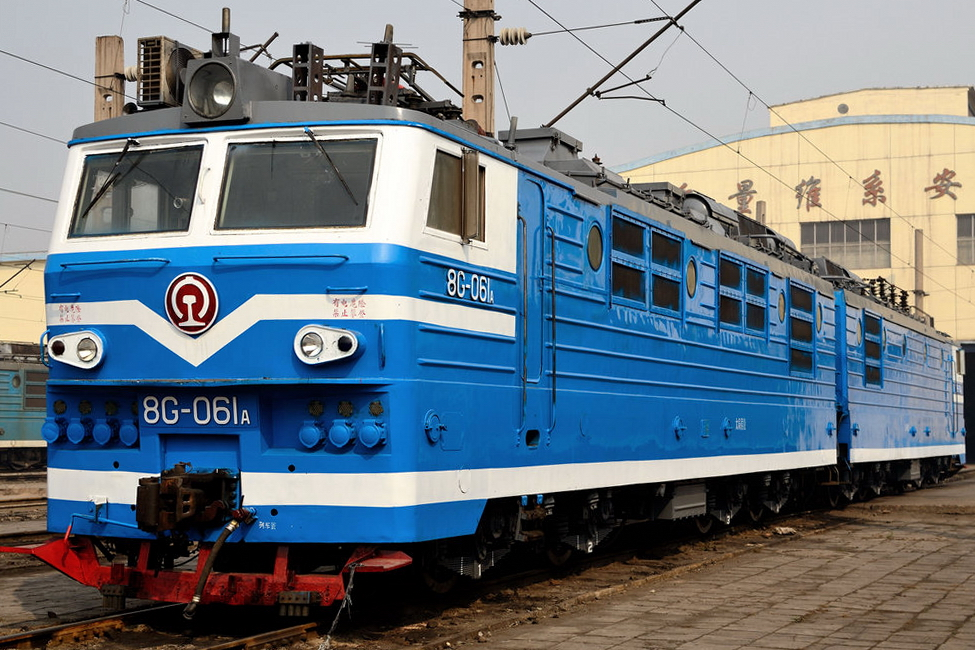
- 8G-061
Type and origin
- Power type: Electric
- Builder: NEVZ SUN
- Build date: 1987–1990
- Total produced: 100
Specifications
- Configuration
  - UIC: Bo′Bo′+Bo′Bo′
- Gauge: 1,435 mm (4 ft 8 1/2 in) standard gauge
- Length: 34.520 m (113.25 ft)(between coupler centers)
- Width: 3.156 m (10.35 ft)
- Height: 3.850 m (12.63 ft)
- Adhesive weight: 23 t (22.6 long tons; 25.4 short tons)
- Loco weight: 184 t (181.1 long tons; 202.8 short tons)
- Electric system/s: 25 kV AC Catenary
- Current pickup(s): Pantograph
Performance figures
- Maximum speed: 100 km/h (62 mph)
- Power output: 6,400 kW (8,600 hp)
Career
- Operators: China Railway
- Numbers: 8G-001-8G-100

The 8G (Note: 8-8 axles;G-Silicon rectifier(Chinese:硅整流; Pinyin:Guī zhěngliú)) is a Soviet-built electric locomotive used in China. It is developed and built by Novocherkassk Electric Locomotive Plant. The design of 8G is based on Soviet Railway VL80^{S} electric locomotives. It is a kind of locomotive with Bo′Bo′+Bo′Bo′ wheel arrangement used in China.

8G Electric Locomotive is an eight shaft fixing reconnection heavy freight electric locomotive that is based on two four-axle locomotives connected.

== Preservation ==
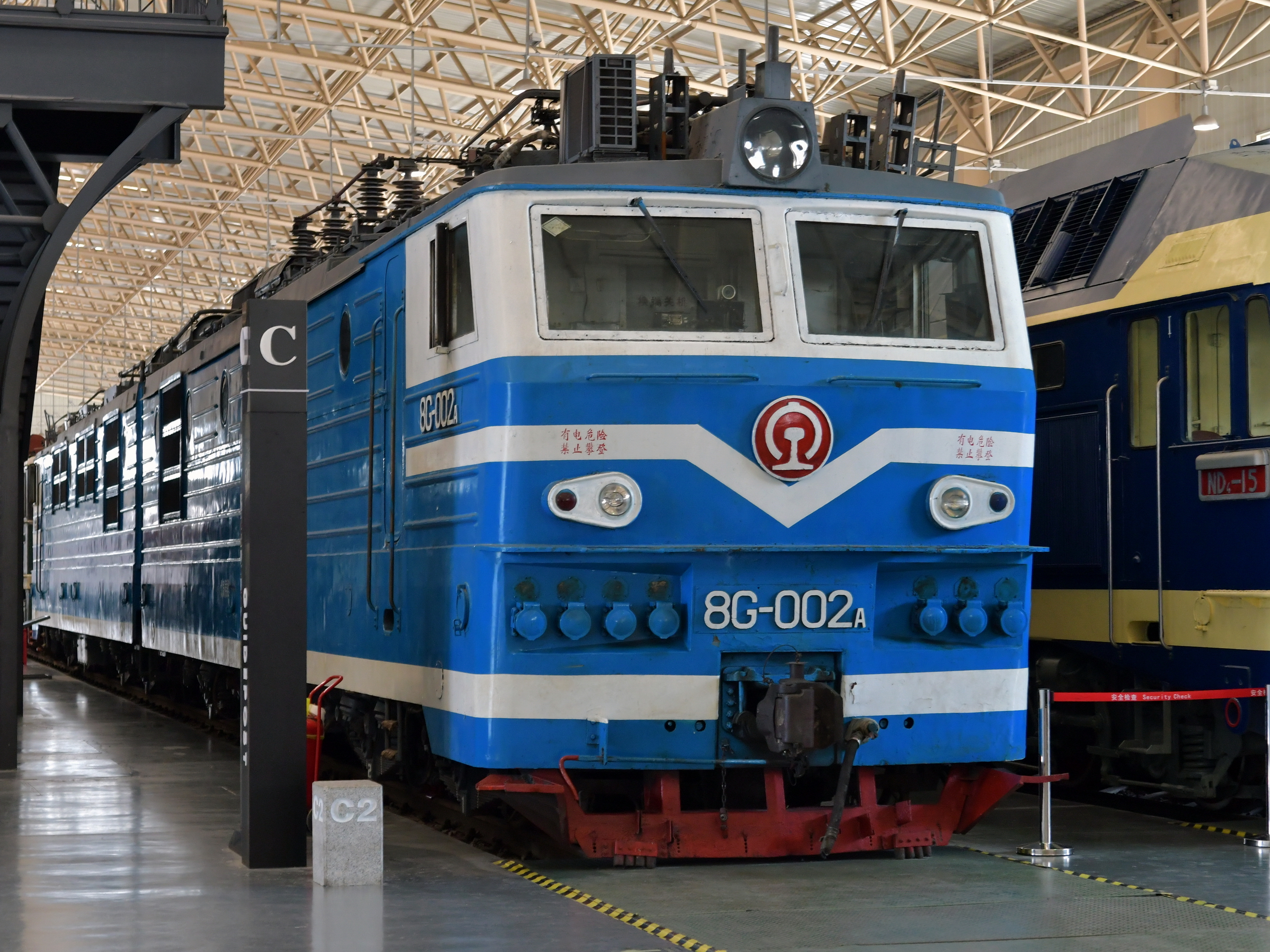
8G-002 at the China Railway Museum

- 8G-002: is preserved at the China Railway Museum
- 8G-076: is preserved at Taiyuan Locomotive Depot, Taiyuan Railway Bureau

== See also ==
- VL80
- China Railways 8K
- China Railways SS4
