= Belarusian Railway BCG-1 =

BCG-1 БКГ-1
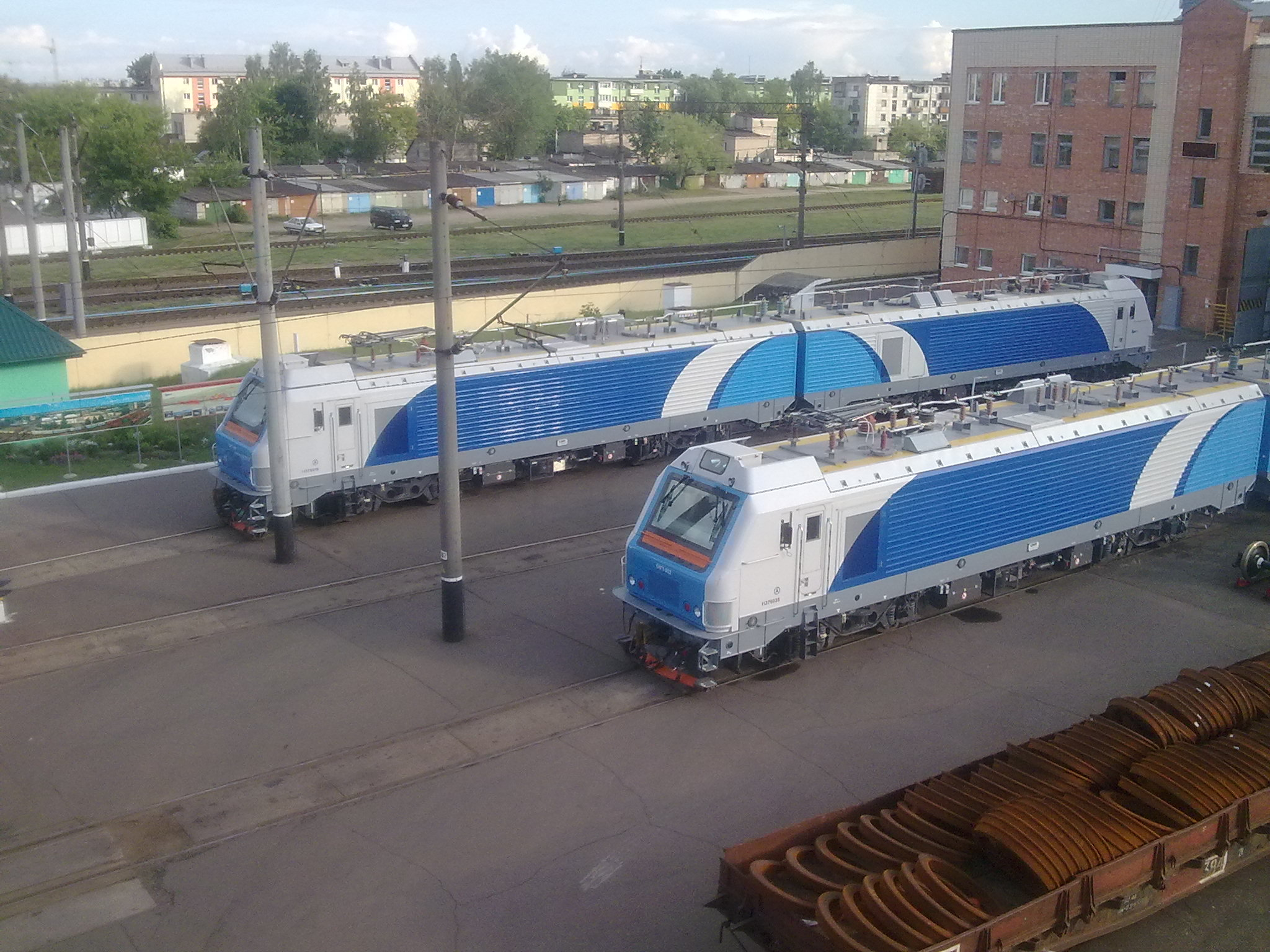
- BCG1-001 and BCG1-002 in TCH-3, Baranavichy
Type and origin
- Power type: Electric
- Builder: CNR Datong Electric Locomotive; Traction equipment supplier: Bombardier CPC propulsion systems Braking equipment: Knorr-Bremse; Transformer: ABB Datong Traction Transformers jv
- Build date: 2012
- Total produced: 12
Specifications
- Configuration
  - UIC: (Bo'Bo')-(Bo'Bo')
- Gauge: 1,520 mm (4 ft 11 27/32 in)
- Electric system/s: 25 kV 50 Hz AC
Performance figures
- Maximum speed: 120 km/h (75 mph)
- Power output: 9.6 MW
Career
- Operators: Belarusian Railway

The Belarusian Railways BCG-1, originally Belarusian Railways BKG-1 (БКГ : Белорусско-Китайский Грузовой), is a type of twin-unit, eight axle, (Bo'Bo')-(Bo'Bo'), high power mainline electric freight locomotive manufactured by CNR Datong Electric Locomotive for the Belarusian Railway. The locomotives are derived from the China Railways HXD2 locomotive type developed from the Alstom Prima locomotive platform.

== History and design ==
In April 2010 CNR Datong announced that it had obtained a 700million Yuan contract to supply 12 twin section electric locomotives to Belarus; the locomotives were to be used to increase haulage capacity from the 4700t to 5500t capacity of the 6.52MW VL80S locomotives to 7500t or better, and would be rated at 9.6MW. The contract was signed in October 2010, funded by the Exim Bank of China through a loan of $84.9 million to ОАО «Беларусбанк».

Construction of the first vehicle began in August 2011 and was completed in December 2011.

The first two locomotives were expected to arrive in Belarus in February, with certification testing being undertaken by the Belarusian State Transport University. The first two of the units were delivered in May 2012 to Baranovichi locomotive depot. The second batch of four locomotives (№ 003-006) arrived in Baranovichi on November 24, 2012.
