= China Railways HXD3B =

Class of Chinese electric locomotives

HXD3B 和谐3B型电力机车
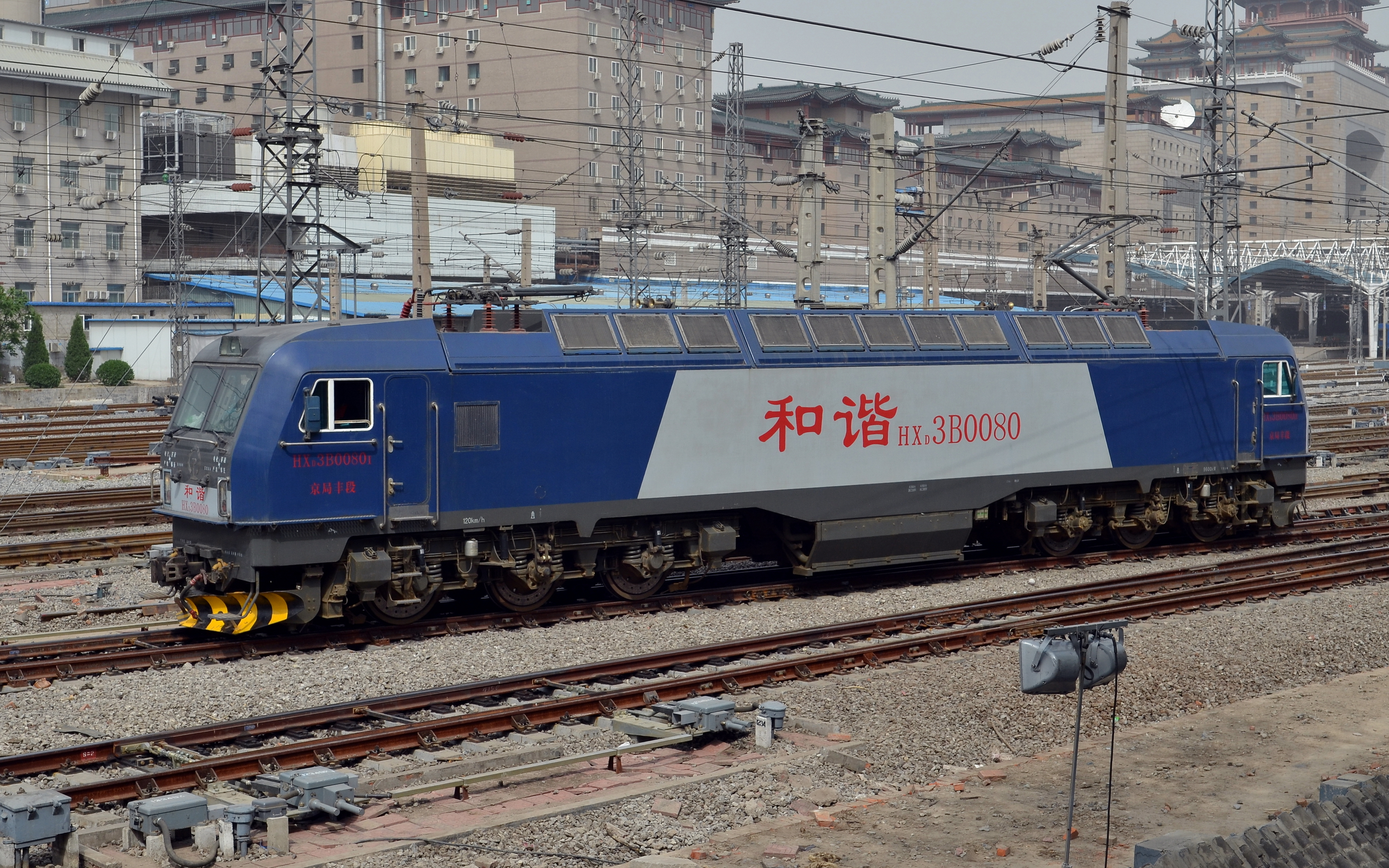
- HXD3B-0080, Beijing, 2012
Type and origin
- Power type: Electric
- Designer: Bombardier Transportation, CNR Dalian Locomotives
- Builder: CNR Dalian Locomotives, Bombardier Transportation
- Build date: 2008–2011
- Total produced: 500
Specifications
- Configuration
  - UIC: Co′Co′
- Gauge: 1,435 mm (4 ft 8 1/2 in) standard gauge
- Wheel diameter: new: 1,250 mm (49.2 in) worn: 1,150 mm (45.3 in)
- Minimum curve: 300 m (984 ft)
- Wheelbase: in bogie: 2x1,950 mm (76.8 in)
- Length: 22,781 mm (74 ft 8.9 in)
- Width: 2,950 mm (116.1 in)
- Height: 4,250 mm (167.3 in)
- Axle load: 25 t (27.6 short tons)
- Loco weight: 150 t (165 short tons)
- Electric system/s: 25 kV 50 Hz AC Catenary
- Current pickup(s): Pantograph
- Traction motors: Bombardier MITRAC DR 3800 N (1,632 kW (2,190 hp))
- Loco brake: regenerative, wheel disc
Performance figures
- Maximum speed: 120 km/h (75 mph)
- Power output: 9,600 kW (12,870 hp)
- Tractive effort: 570 kN (128,000 lbf) starting 506 kN (114,000 lbf) continuous up to 68.2 km/h (42.4 mph); 292 kN (65,600 lbf) @ 120 km/h (75 mph)
- Brakeforce: regenerative: 480 kN (108,000 lbf) @ 72–5 km/h (44.7–3.1 mph)
Career
- Operators: China Railway
- Class: HX_{D}3B
- Numbers: HX_{D}3B0001-HX_{D}3B0500
- Locale: People's Republic of China

The HXD3B (Chinese: 和谐3B型电力机车) is a class of electric locomotives for heavy freight service built by Bombardier Transportation and CNR Dalian Locomotives.

== History ==
The Ministry of Railways of the People's Republic of China (MOR) ordered 500 locomotives in February 2007 for €1.1 billion (US$1.4 billion) from Dalian Locomotives and Bombardier Transportation, with Bombardier's share amounting to €370 million (US$480 million). The first unit, HXD3B0001 was delivered on 29 December 2008 in Dalian, the entire order of 500 machines will be delivered by the end of 2011.

== Technical details ==
The HXD3B is based on the Bombardier-produced MTAB Iore twin-section locomotives, but is a single-section locomotive with cabs at both ends. The electronics were updated, with traction converters based on IGCT technology, and an updated version of the MITRAC control electronics developed by Bombardier's Switzerland branch. With increased power and a maximum speed of 120 km/h (75 mph), the locomotives were designed for general freight rather than specialised heavy-haul service.

The electronics and traction equipment of the first 150 units were supplied by Bombardier from Europe, production for the rest is shared between Bombardier's Chinese subsidiary and Dalian. The design of the mechanical components was subject to technology transfer from Bombardier to Dalian.

== Gallery ==
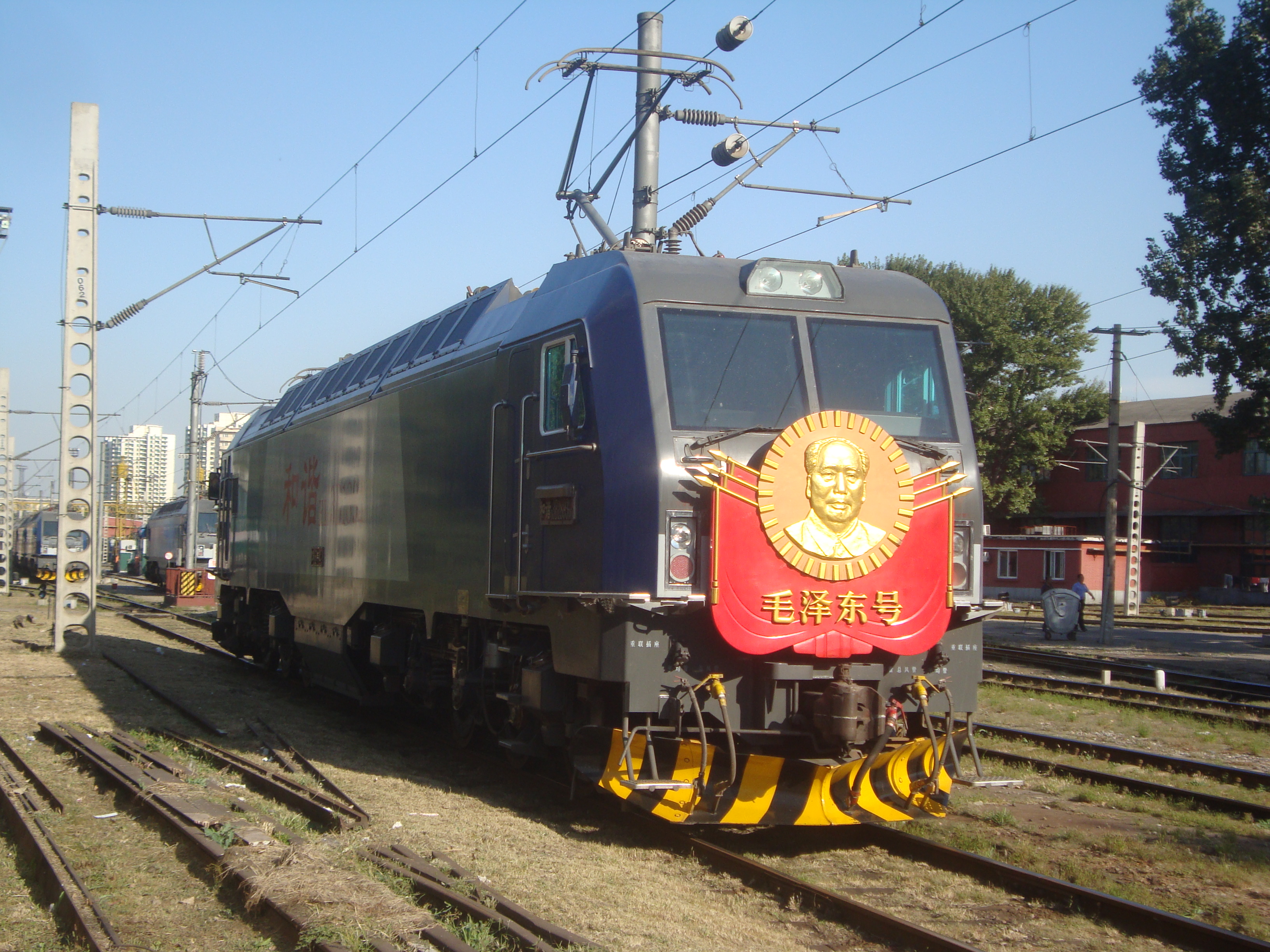
HXD3B-1893, the 5th Mao Zedong Locomotive.

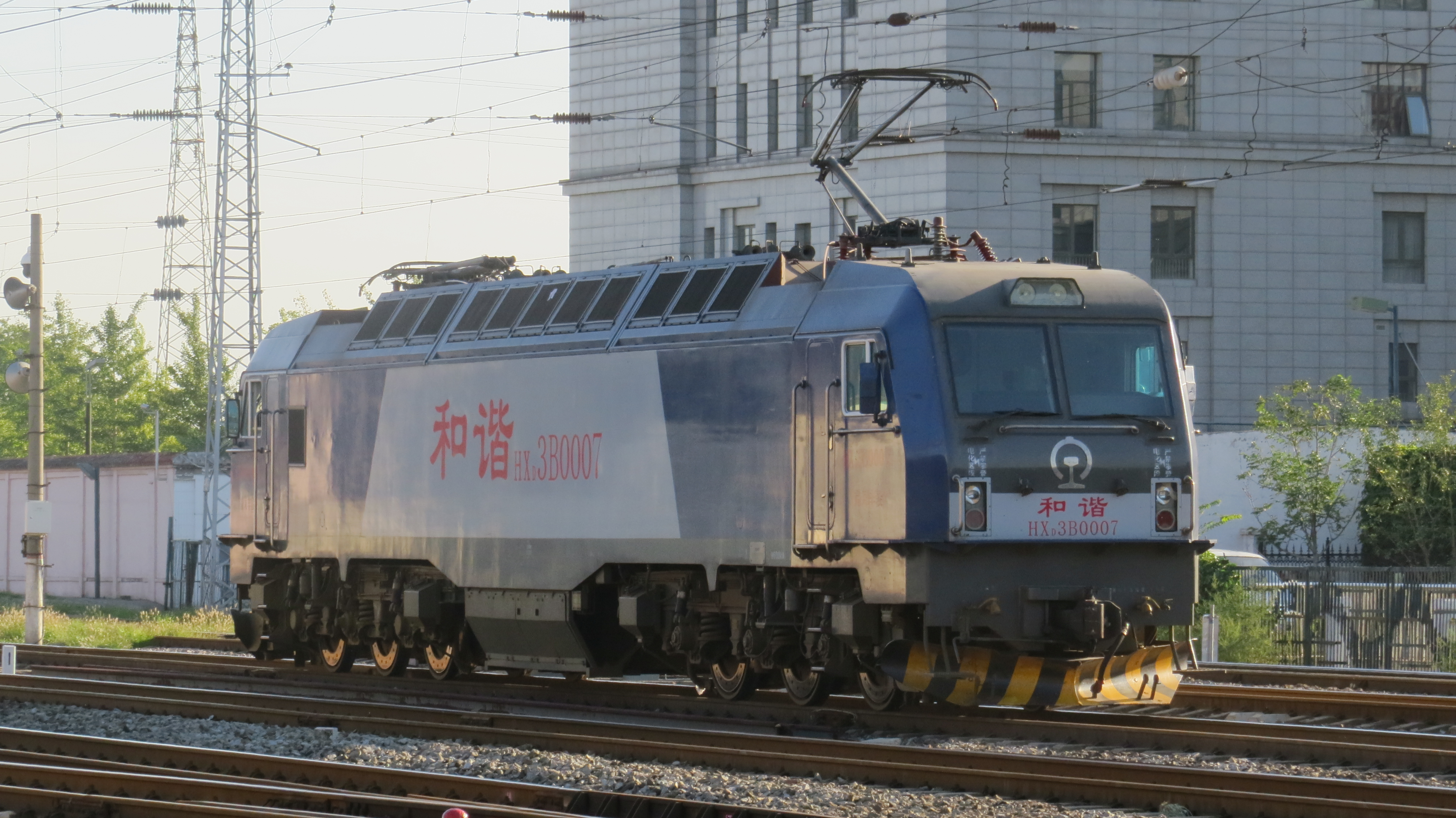
HXD3B-0007 in Fengtai South Signal Base.

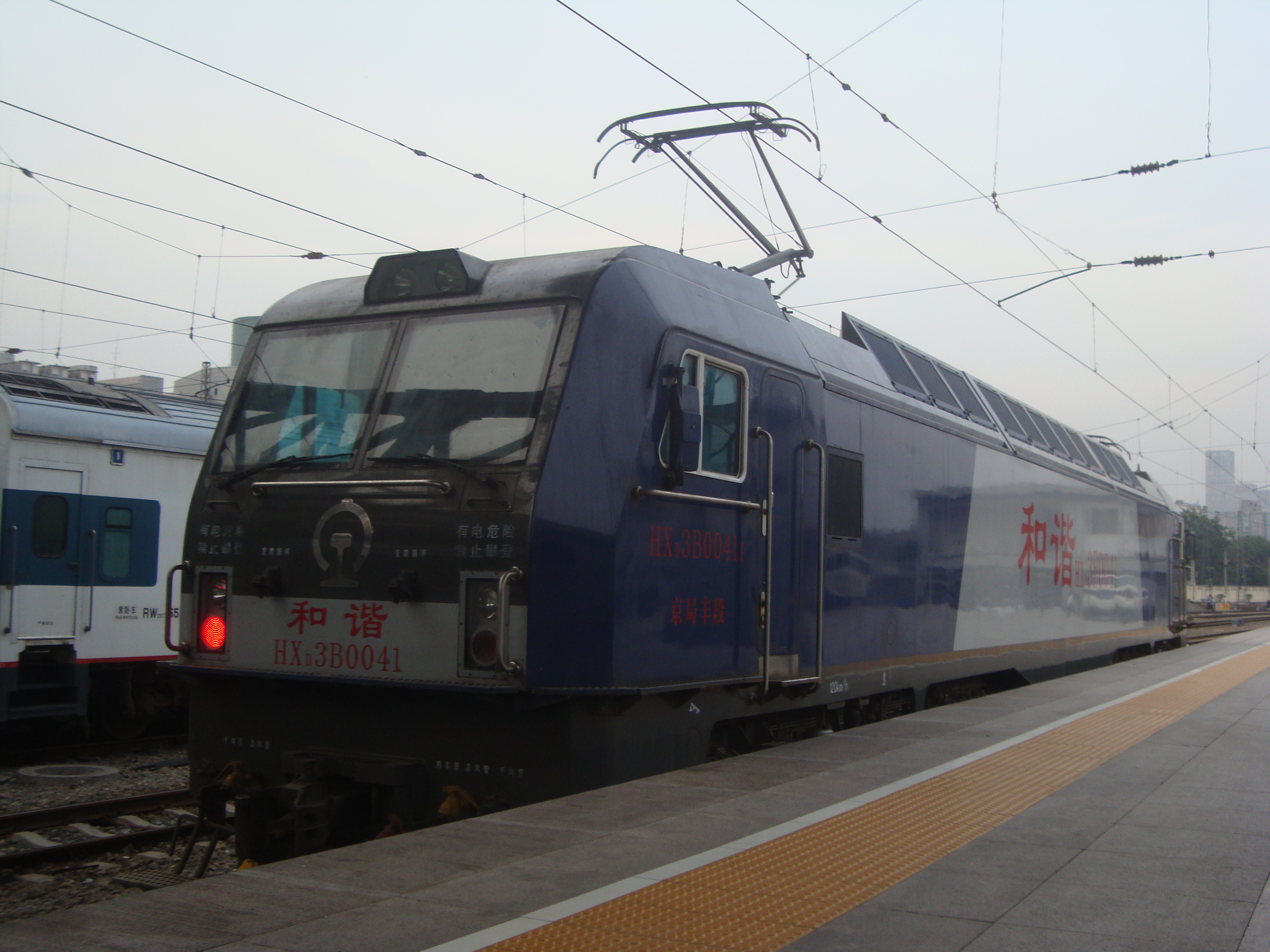
HXD3B-0041 in Beijing railway station.

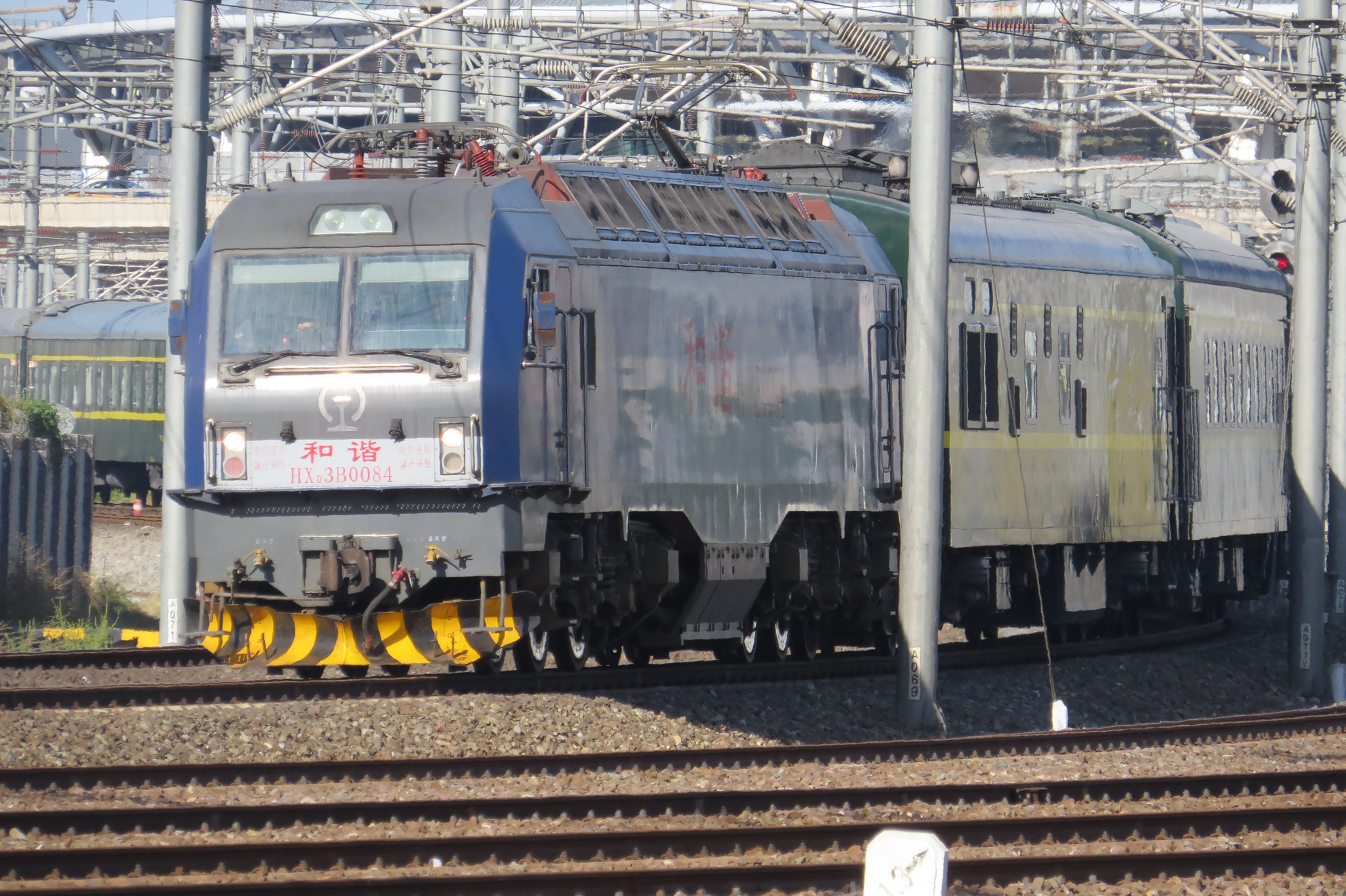
A passenger train hauled by HXD3B-0084.

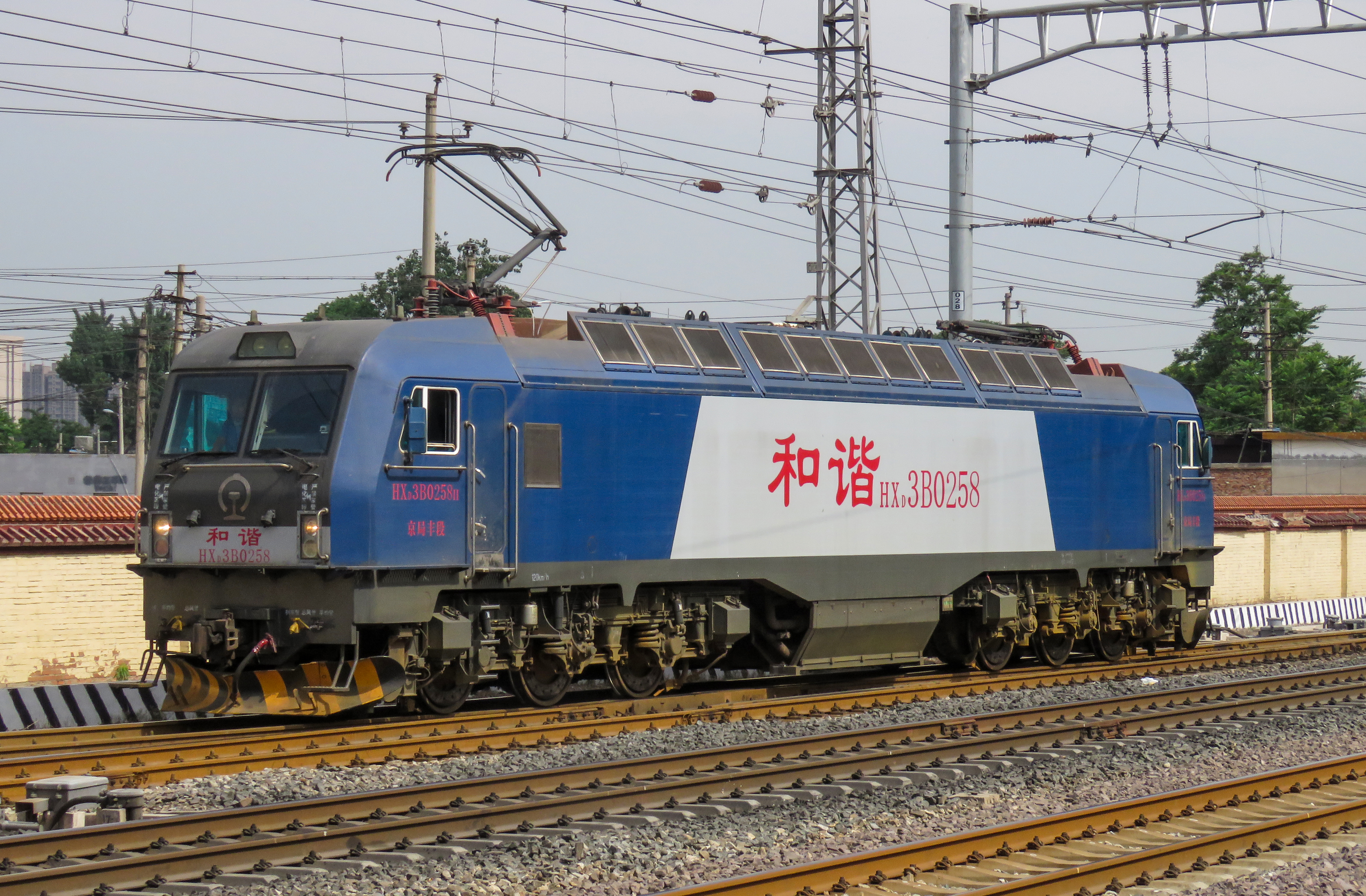
HXD3B-0258

== Named locomotive ==
- HXD3B-1893: "Mao Zedong"
