= China Railways 8K =

Class of Chinese electric locomotives

8K
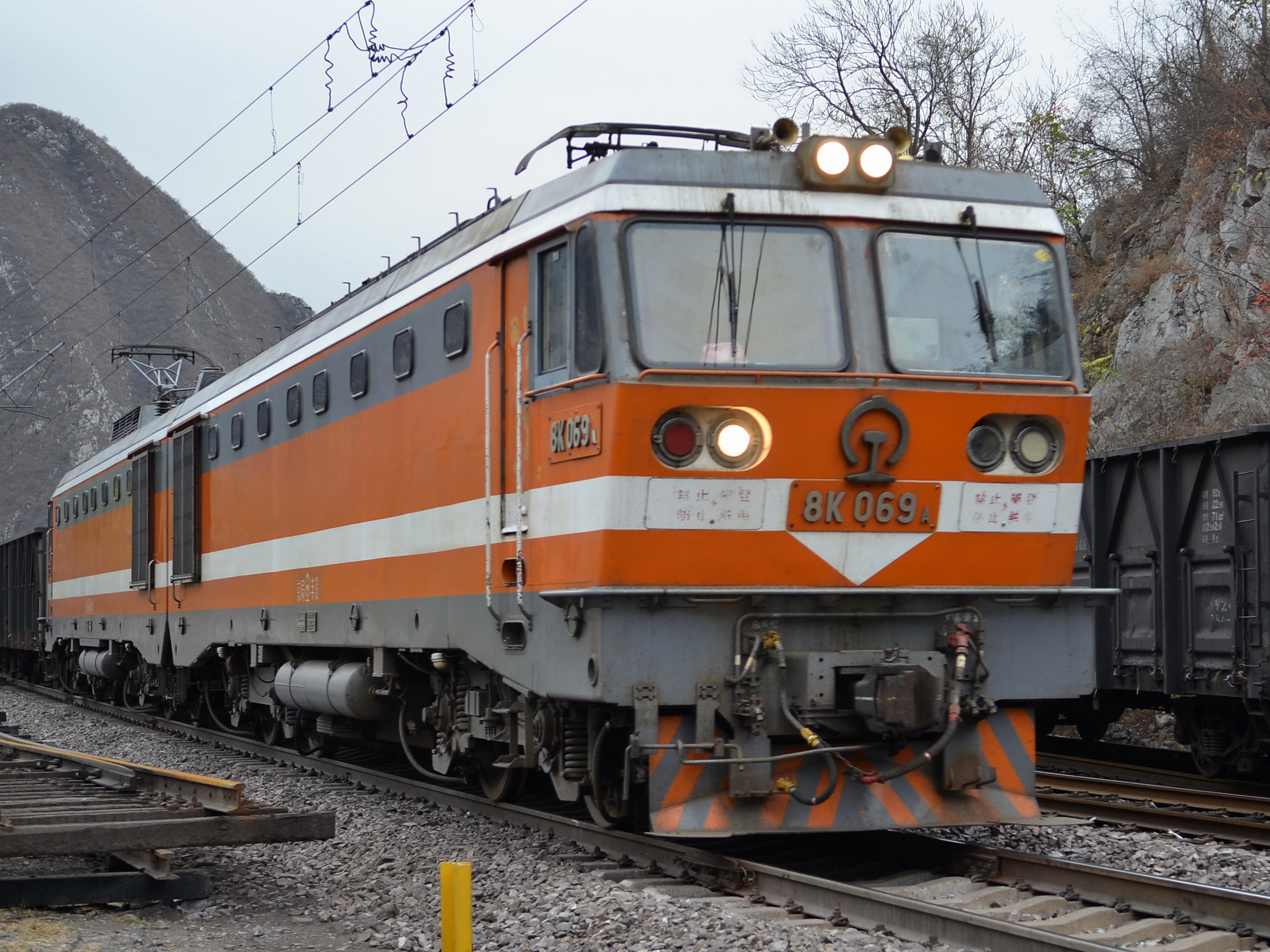
- 8K-069
Type and origin
- Power type: Electric
- Builder: Alstom(Most of 8Ks); Zhuzhou Electric Locomotive Works(Last two 8Ks-149 and 150)
- Build date: 1987-1989
- Total produced: 150
Specifications
- Configuration
  - UIC: Bo′Bo′+Bo′Bo′
- Gauge: 1,435 mm (4 ft 8 1/2 in) standard gauge
- Length: 36.228 m (118.86 ft)(between coupler centers)
- Width: 3.048 m (10.00 ft)
- Height: 3.980 m (13.06 ft)
- Adhesive weight: 23 t (22.6 long tons; 25.4 short tons)
- Loco weight: 184 t (181.1 long tons; 202.8 short tons)
- Electric system/s: 25 kV AC Catenary
- Current pickup: Pantograph
Performance figures
- Maximum speed: 150 km/h (93 mph)
Career
- Operators: China Railway
- Numbers: 8K-001-8K-150
- Nicknames: 法国橙 (French Orange)

The 8K is a French-built electric locomotive used in China. It is developed and built by Alstom. The design of 8K is based on SNCF Class BB 15000 electric locomotives. It is a kind of locomotives with Bo′Bo′+Bo′Bo′ wheel arrangement used in China.

8K Electric Locomotive is an eight shaft fixing reconnection heavy freight electric locomotive which based on two four-axle locomotives connected.

Retirement took place between 2010 and 2015 due to the increasingly serious lack of spare parts.

== Preservation ==
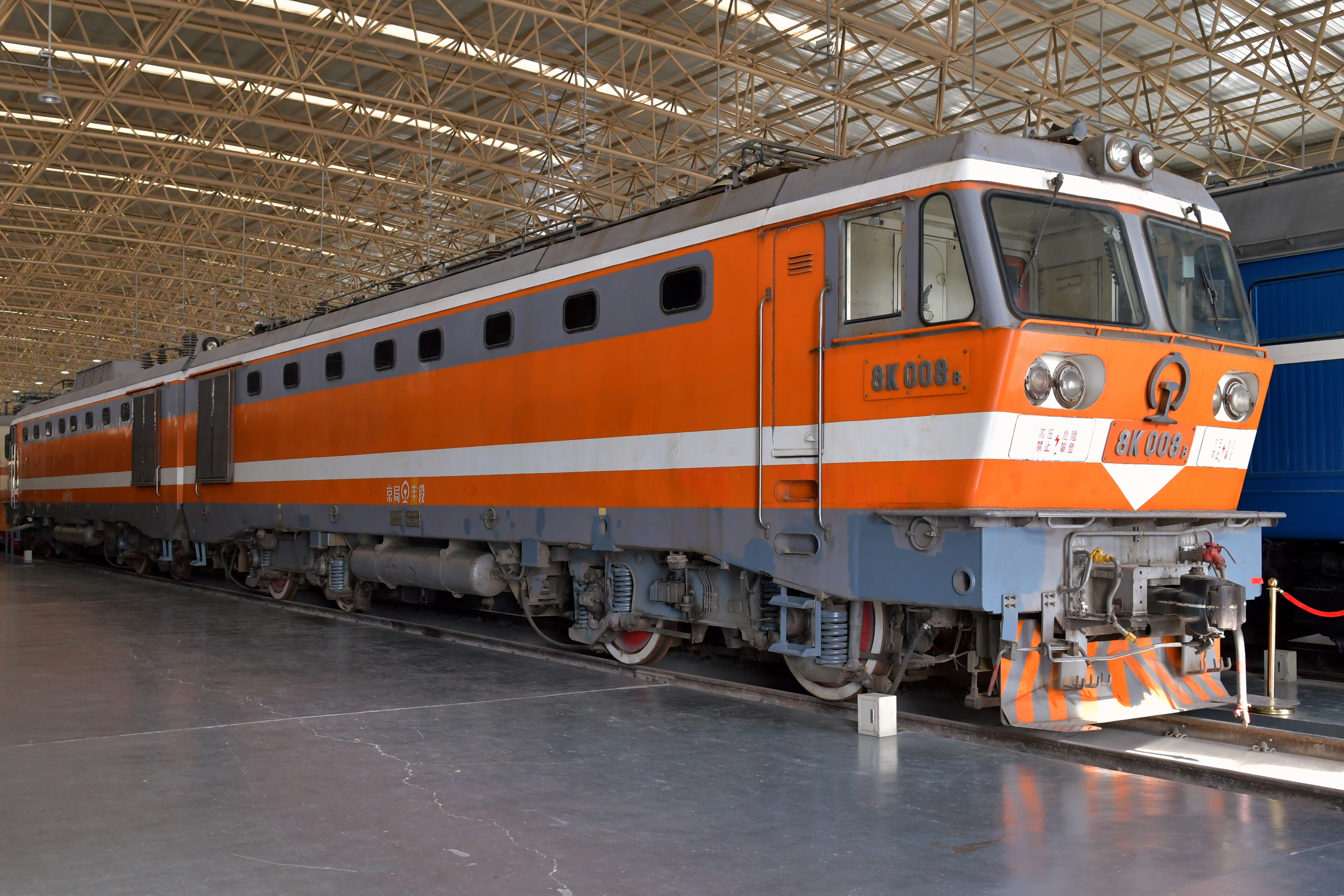
8K-008 at the China Railway Museum

- 8K-001: is preserved at Fengtai Locomotive Depot, Beijing Railway Bureau
- 8K-008: is preserved at China Railway Museum
- 8K-065: is preserved at Tianjin Railway Vacational Technical College
- 8K-091: is preserved at Taiyuan Locomotive Depot, Taiyuan Railway Bureau

== See also ==
- List of locomotives in China
- China Railways 6Y2
- China Railways 8G
- China Railways SS4
- China Railways HXD2
