= China Railways HXD2C =

Class of Chinese electric locomotives

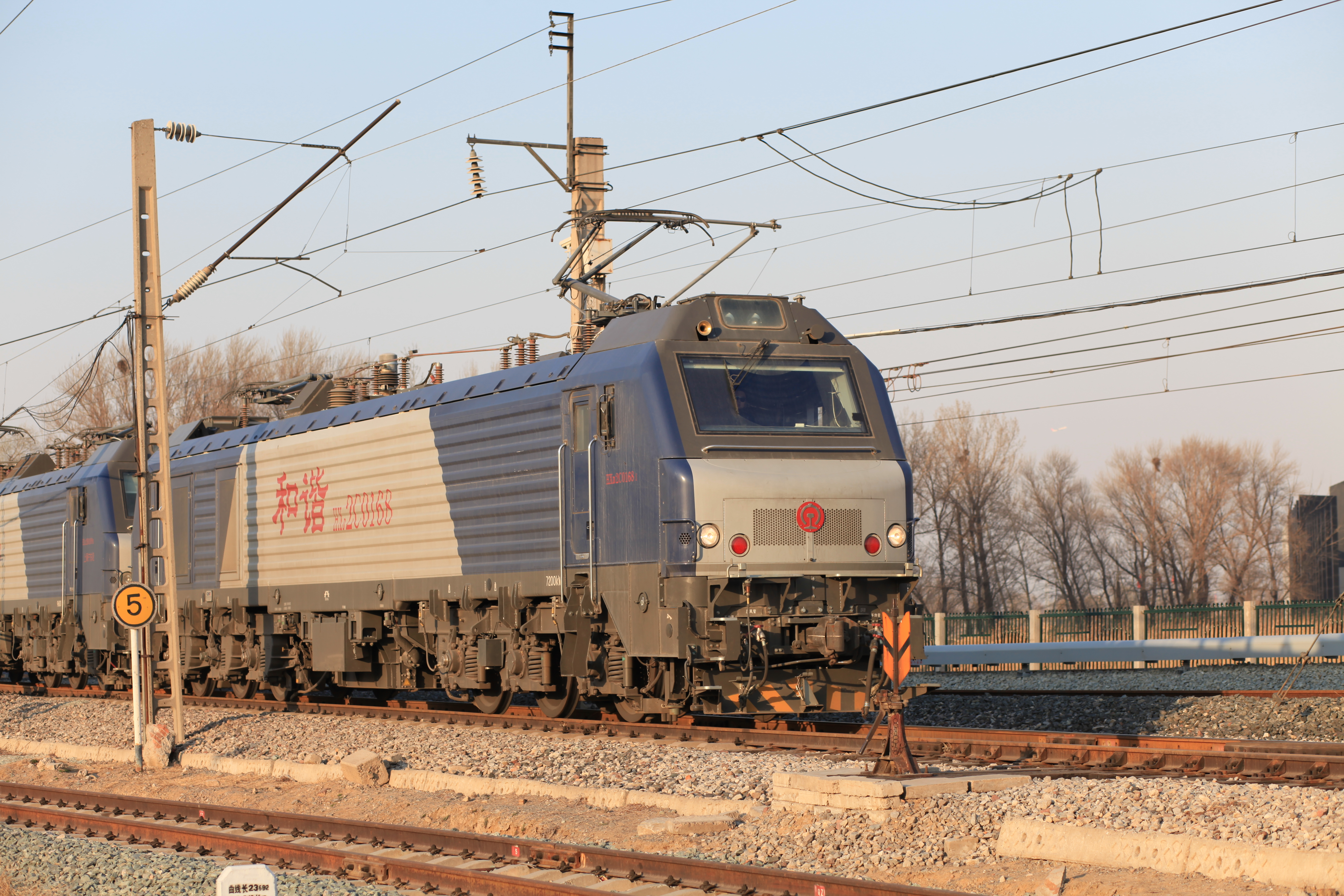
HXD2C-0168

The HXD2C is a 6 axle Co′Co′ freight locomotive which shares a similar exterior design with the HXD2B. The individually inverter controlled traction motors, body structure overall structural design also are the same as other members of the series; with transformers from ABB. The locomotive power is reduced to 7.2 MW (9,700 hp), suitable for trains of 5,000–6,000 tonnes (4,900–5,900 long tons; 5,500–6,600 short tons). The locomotive can be ballasted to give axle loads from 23 to 25 tonnes (22.6 to 24.6 long tons; 25.4 to 27.6 short tons). The HXD2C locomotives are constructed by CNR Datong.

220 units were ordered in 2010 at a cost of over 3 billion Yuan. In May 2010 the first locomotive was produced. Locomotives are expected to be used on the Shijiazhuang–Taiyuan railway line, used for coal trains from Shanxi, with the first train running in December 2010.
