= China Railways HXD2B =

Class of Chinese electric locomotives

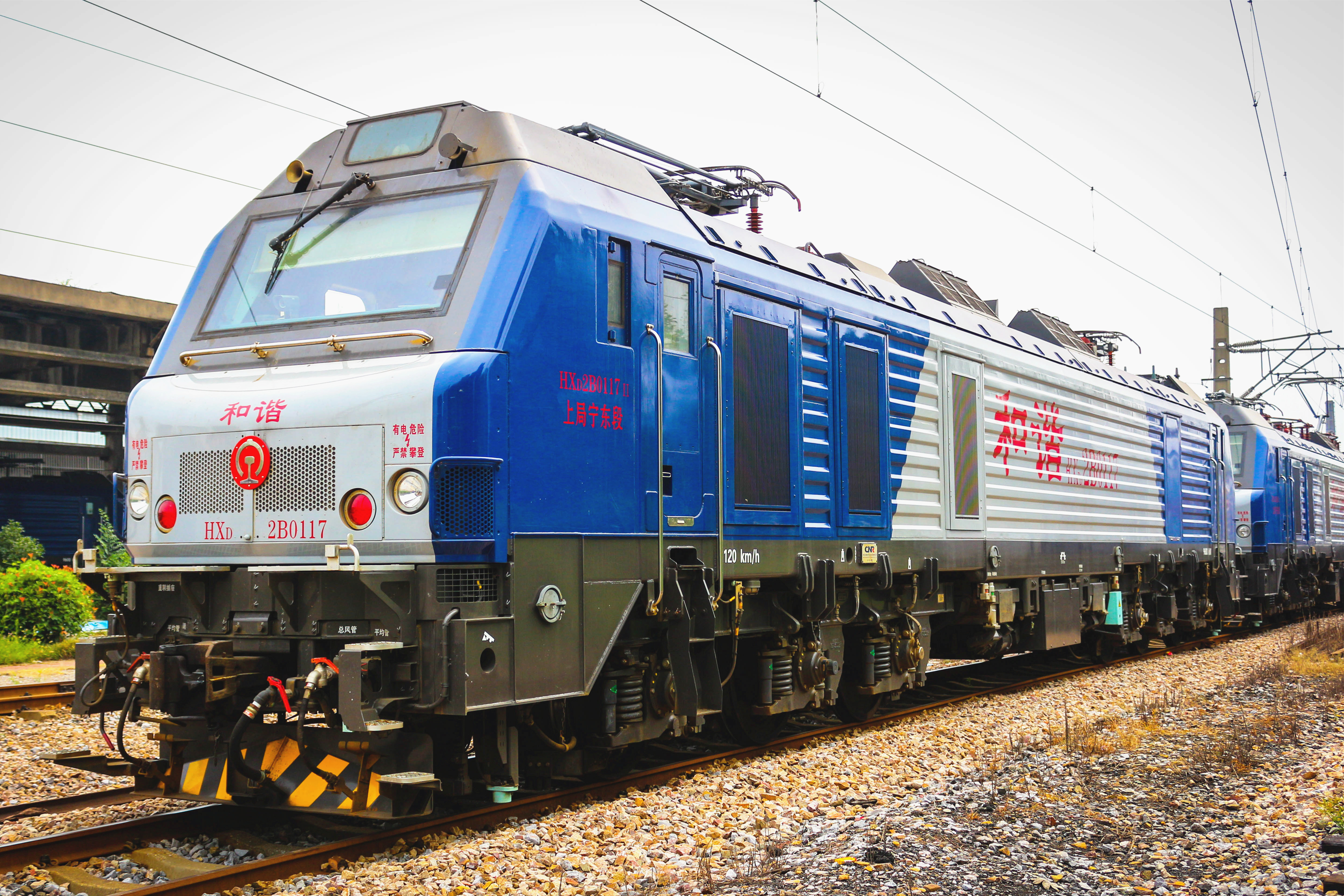
HXD2B-0117 in Nanjing

The HXD2B is a 6 axle Co′Co′ locomotive designed for heavy freight mainline work. The design is a single body twin cab locomotive with 6 axles in Co′Co′ wheel arrangement. The body frame, traction motor power electronics and driver facilities are of a similar design as the HXD2. The bogie design differs from the HXD2 using a straight welded steel frame rather than the 'mouth' shaped form used in the HXD2.

An order worth €1.2billion (25% Alstom, 75% Datong) for 500 units was made in 2006. The first 100 units were to be built primarily by Alstom, this number was reduced in 2007 to 10 units. The first Chinese-built unit was produced in December 2009. The order is expected to be complete by 2012.

== See also ==
- China Railways 8K, twin-unit locomotives produced by Alstom for China in the 1980s. see also 8K locomotive (Chinese language)
- List of locomotives in China
