= Belarusian Railway =

State-owned railway company in Belarus

BCh / БЧ / БелЖД

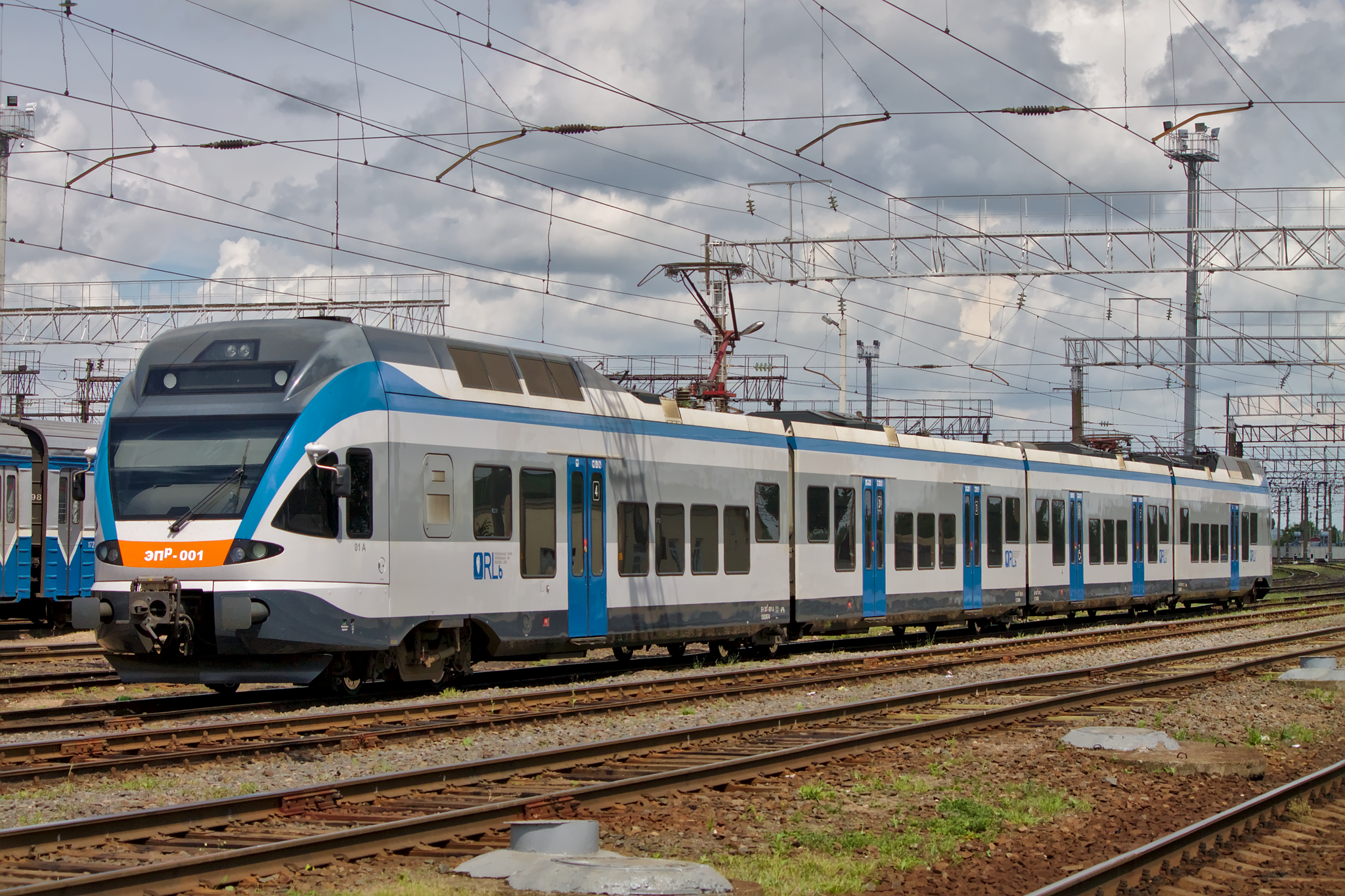
- Industry: Railways
- Founded: 1992; 34 years ago
- Headquarters: Minsk, Belarus
- Area served: Belarus
- Services: Passenger trains, Rail transport, Cargo
- Owner: Government of Belarus
- Number of employees: 60,000 (2025)
- Website: www.rw.by

Belarusian Railway (BCh) (Belarusian: Беларуская чыгунка (БЧ) / Biełaruskaja čyhunka, Russian: Белорусская железная дорога (БелЖД)) (Note: In the second decade of the 21st century the railway moved from using the Russian language for printed publications, to bilinguality - using Belarusian and Russian.) is Belarus' fully state-owned vertically integrated railway company, both managing infrastructure and operating freight and passenger train services and has a near-monopoly on train travel in Belarus.

== Overview ==
The company, formed in 1992 after the dissolution of the Soviet Union, is one of the inheritors of the Soviet Railways. It administers 5,512 km of railway with (1,520 mm (4 ft 11 27/32 in) Russian gauge). The railway's most important station is Minsk Terminal, the central station of the capital.

BCh reports to the ministry of transport and as of 2010 was composed of 84 organizations; 46 enterprises, 38 institutions, and 7 factories/plants. The rail network is divided into 6 departments: named after the regions around Minsk, Baranovichi, Brest, Gomel, Mogilev and Vitebsk.

== Infrastructure ==
Беларуская чыгунка (БЧ) Белорусская железная дорога (БелЖД) Belarusian Railway (BCh)

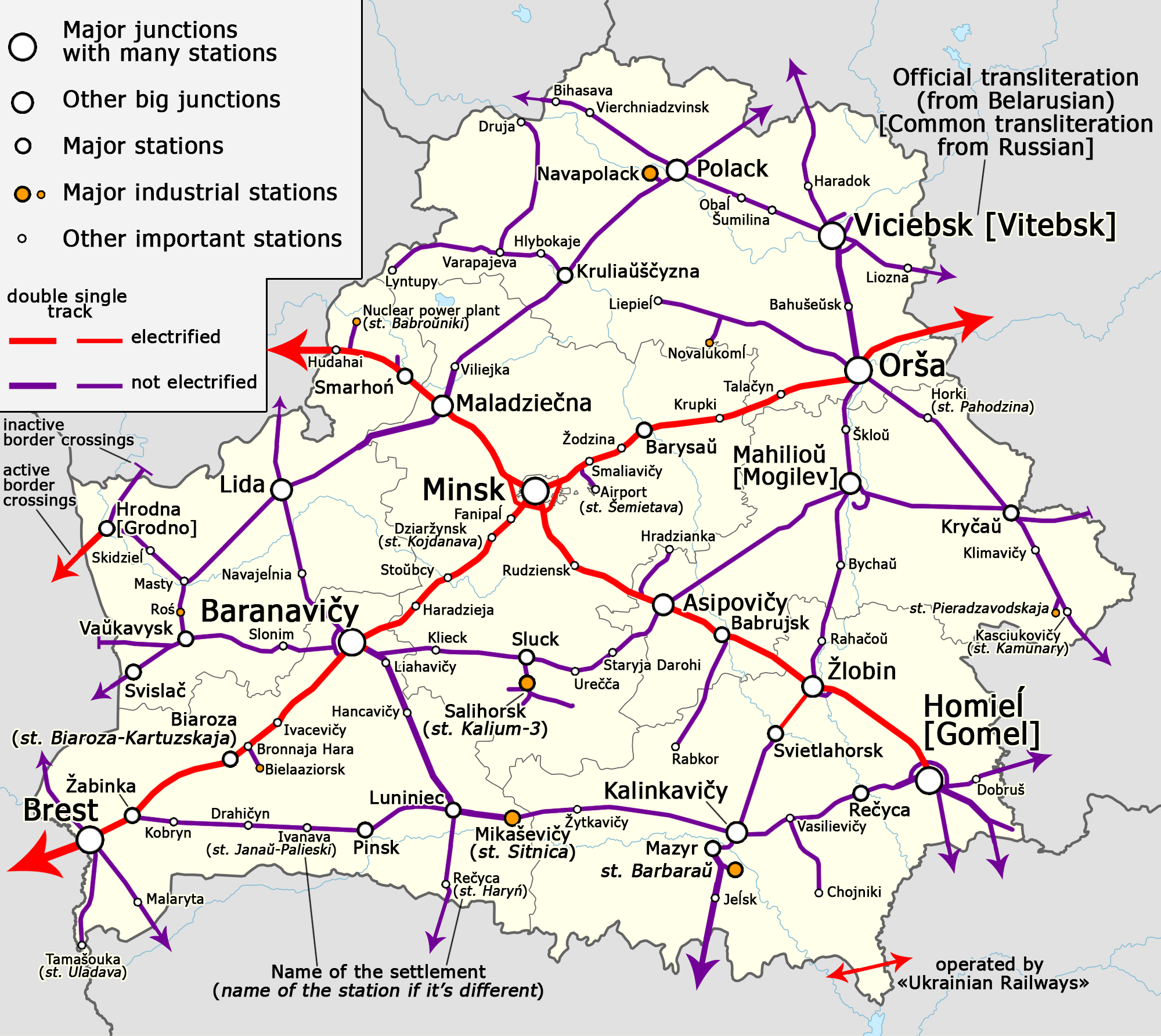

Overview
- Headquarters: Minsk
- Reporting mark: BCh, BelZhD
- Locale: Belarus
- Dates of operation: 1992–present
- Predecessor: Soviet Railways

Technical
- Track gauge: 1,520 mm (4 ft 11 27/32 in)
- Electrification: 3 kV DC, 25 kV AC Main
- Length: 5,491 km (3,412 mi)

Other
- Website: www.rw.by

=== Rolling stock ===
Electric locomotives

- ChS4T; Co'Co' electric locomotive
- VL80, BCG-1; twin-unit (Bo'Bo')-(Bo'Bo') locomotives

Diesel locomotives

- M62, TE10, 2TE116, TEP60, TEP70, ChME3; Co'Co' diesel electric locomotives
- TGK2; two-axle diesel shunter

Passenger multiple units

- DR1; diesel multiple unit
- ER9, Stadler FLIRT (EP^{g}, EP^{r}, EP^{m}); electric multiple units
- DP1, DP3, DP6 Pesa; diesel multiple unit for Minsk-Vilnius services.

== International sanctions ==
Belarusian Railway was included in the sanctions lists of Canada in November 2022 and Ukraine in January 2023, respectively. Canada also blacklisted Vladimir Morozov, the head of Belarusian Railway, as later did the European Union, Switzerland, Ukraine, Australia and New Zealand.

== Gallery ==
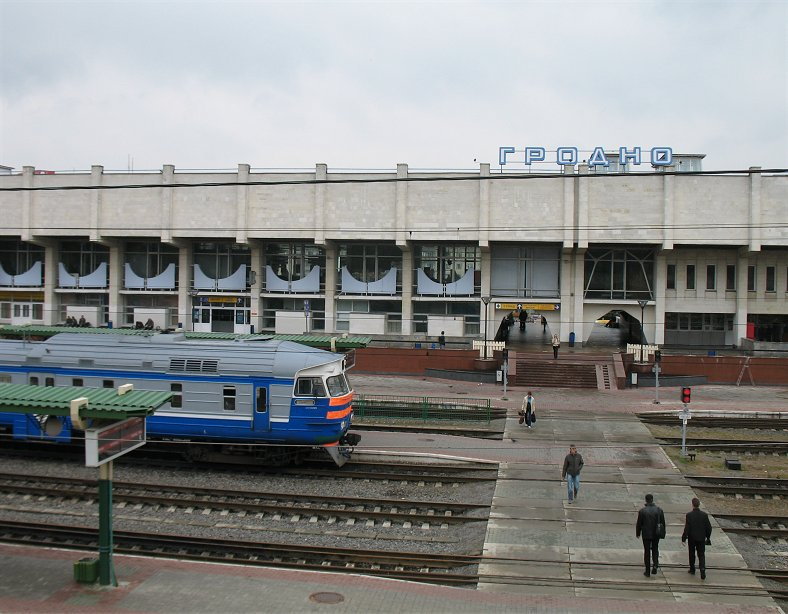
Main station of Grodno

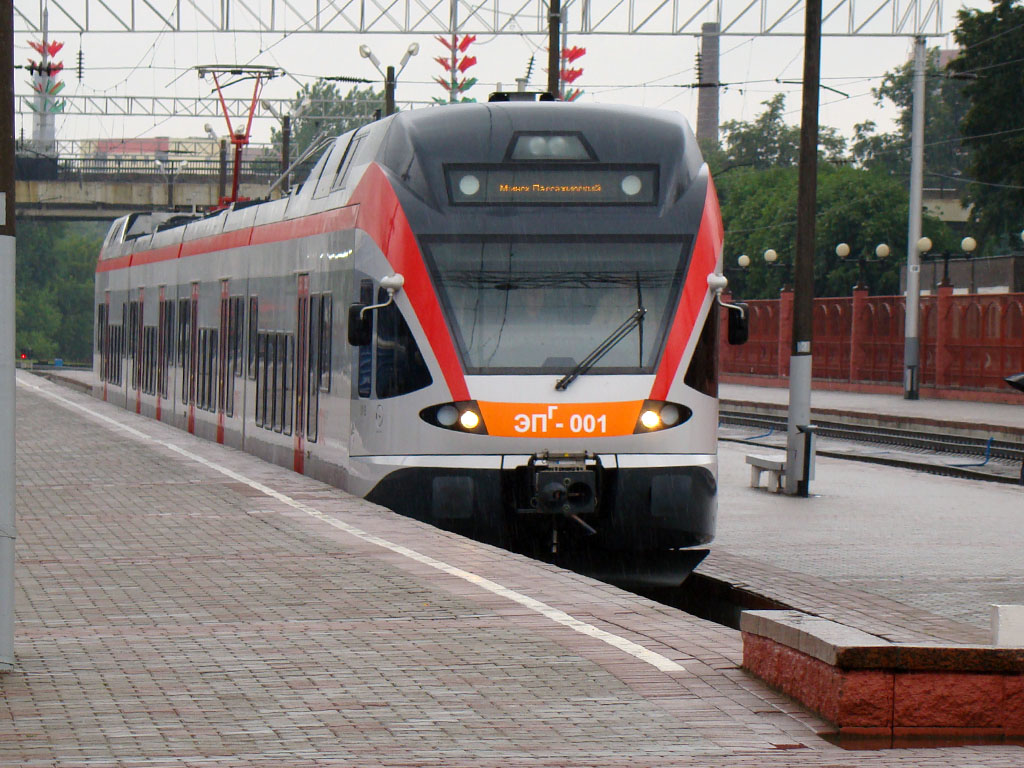
Stadler FLIRT in Minsk

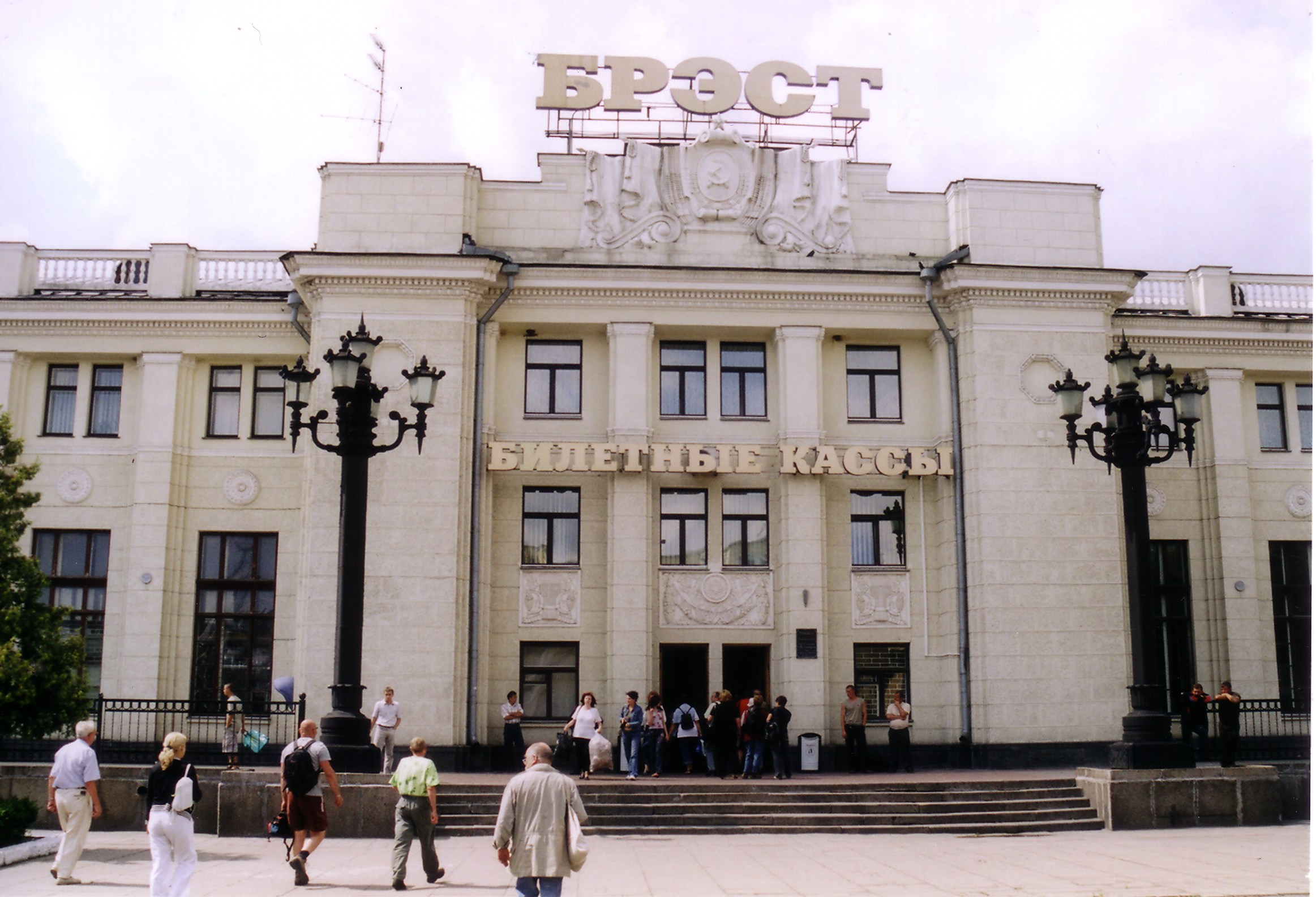
Main station of Brest

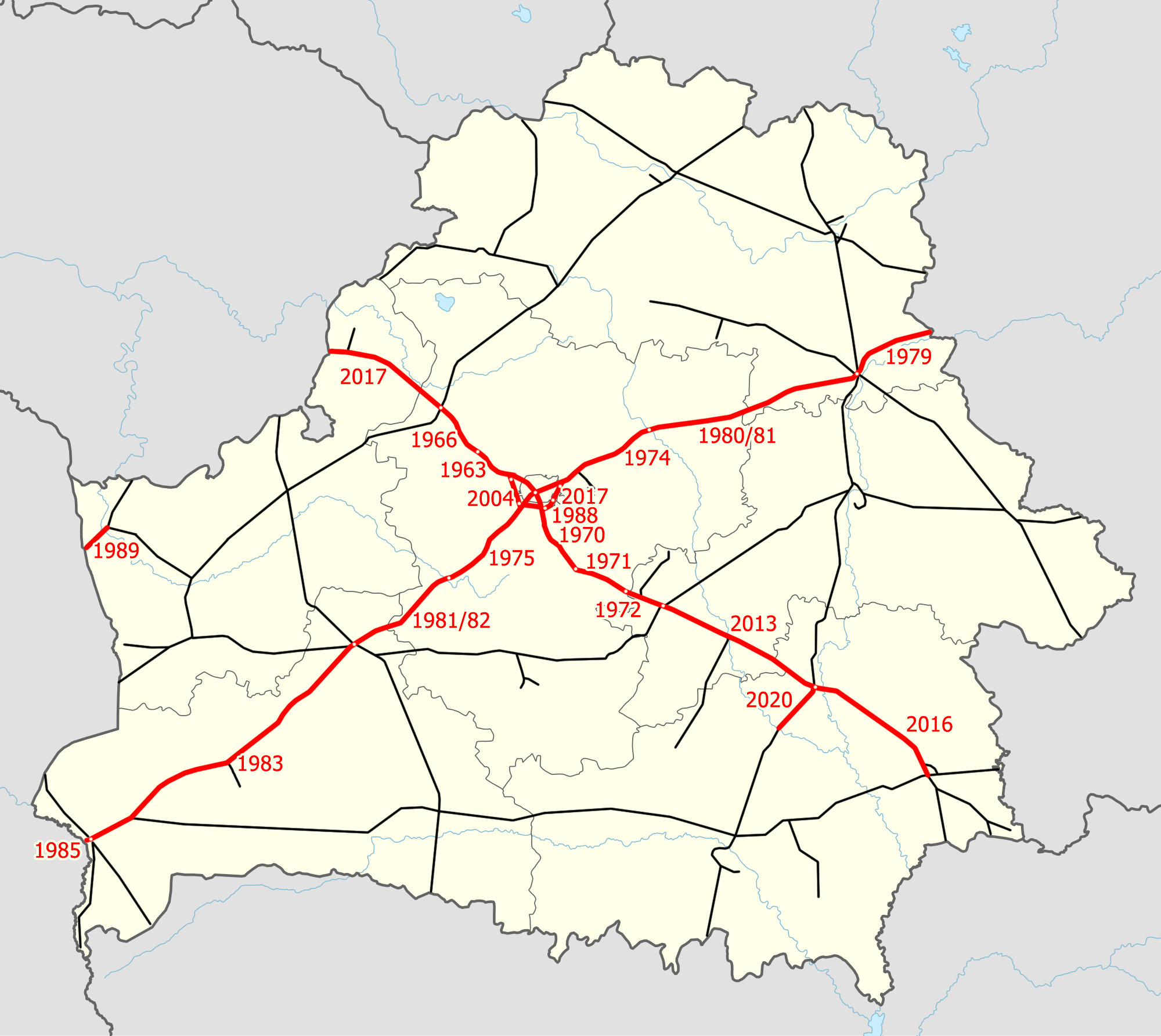
Electrification map

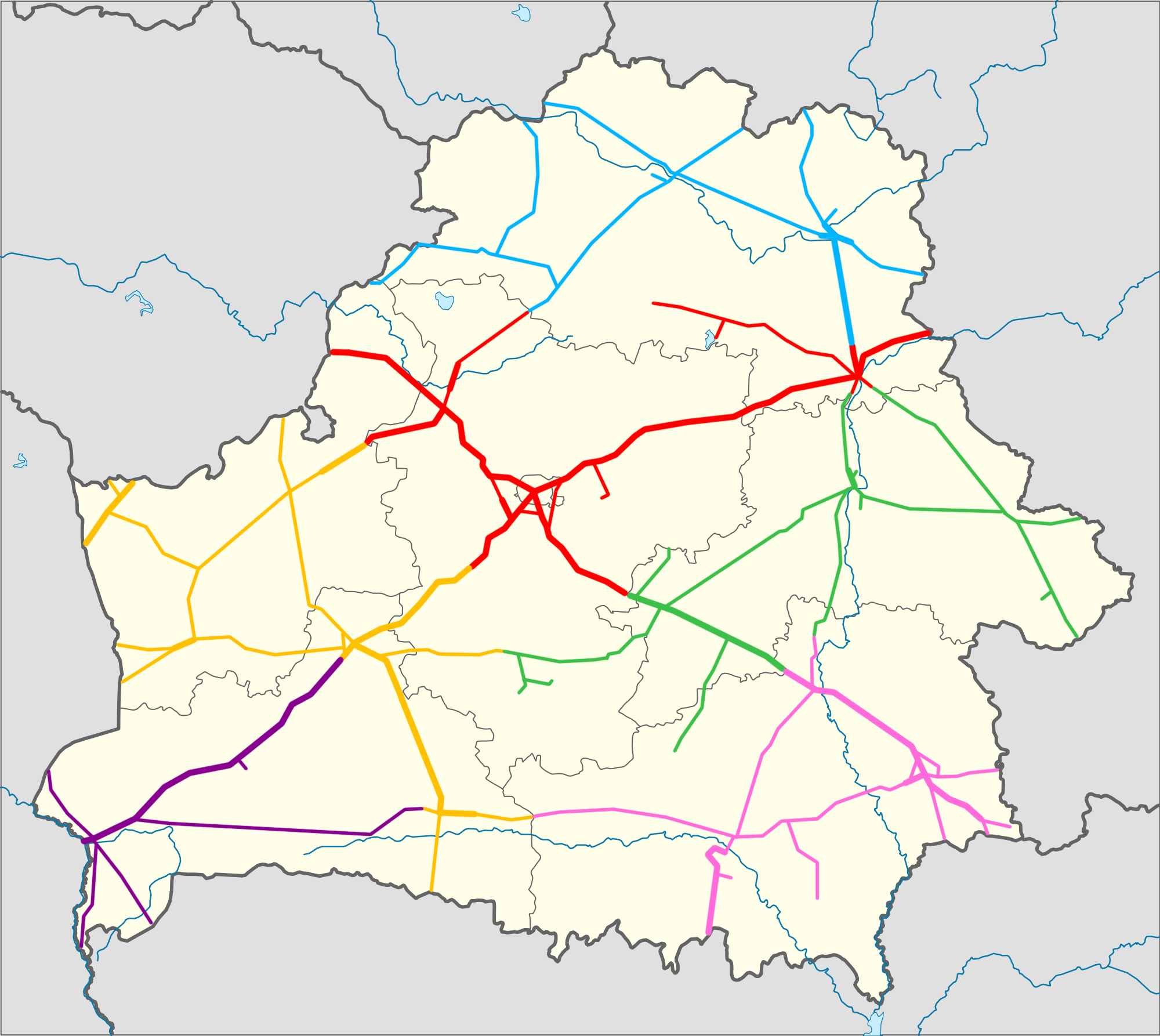
Map of the system
Minsk branch; Baranavichy (Baranovichi) branch; Brest branch; Homiel (Gomel) branch; Mahiliow (Mogilev) branch; Viciebsk (Vitebsk) branch

== See also ==
- Minsk Railway station
- Rail transport in Belarus
