= Longest trains =

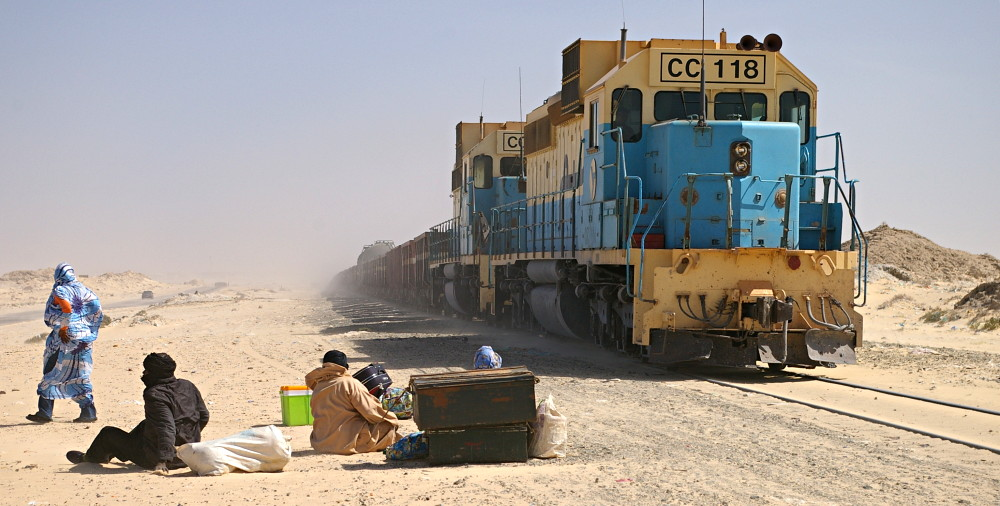
Mauritania Railway iron ore train at the station in Nouadhibou.

The length of a train may be measured in number of wagons (commonly used for bulk commodities such as coal and iron ore) or in metres for general freight. On electrified railways, particularly those using lower-voltage systems such as 3 kV DC and 1.5 kV DC, train lengths and loads are often limited by traction and power supply constraints. Other limiting factors include drawgear (coupler) strength, coupling systems, track curvature, gradients, and the lengths of crossing loops (passing sidings).

The development of distributed power—where locomotives are placed mid-train or at the rear of the consist and remotely controlled from the lead unit—has enabled the operation of very long freight trains, sometimes exceeding 6 kilometres (3.7 mi; 20,000 ft) in length. By distributing traction and braking forces more evenly throughout the train, this configuration allows for longer and heavier consists while reducing the risk of derailment, particularly on curves.

The longest train to date was operated by Transnet in South Africa in 2026 that was 7.602 km (4.724 mi) long and had 696 wagons.

== Bulk ==
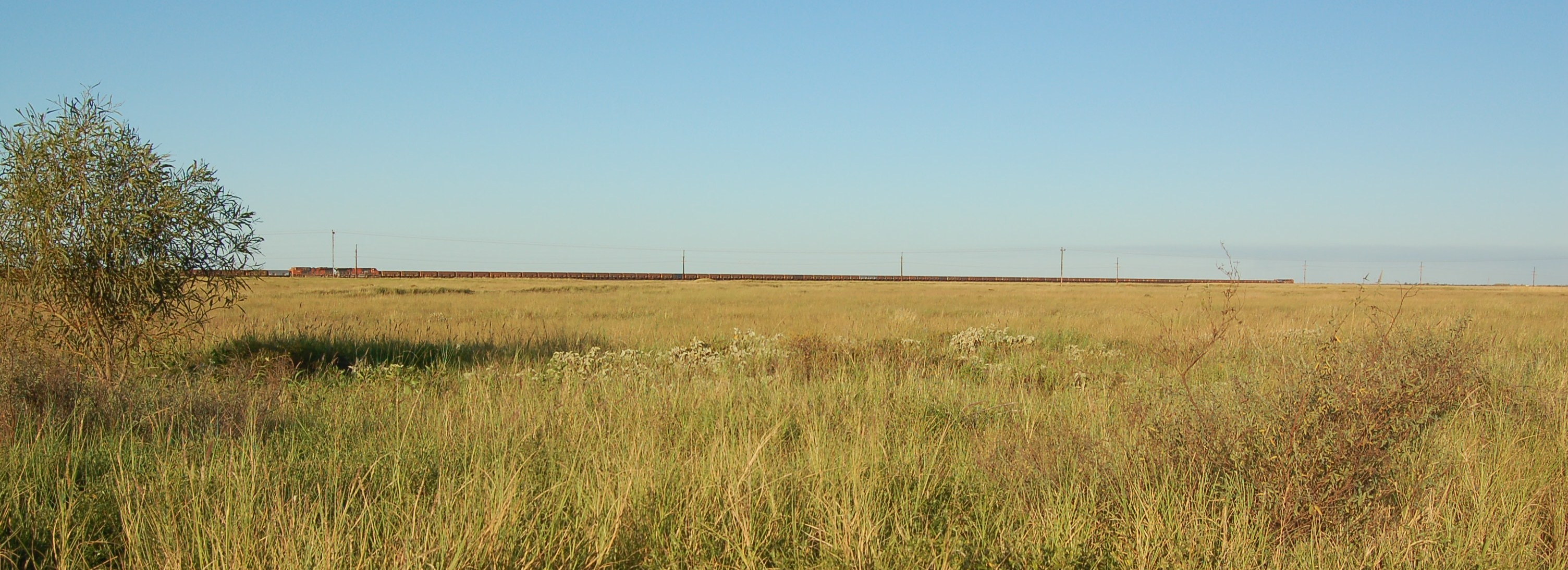
A BHP Billiton Iron Ore train with 264 cars heads out of Port Hedland on the Mount Newman railway towards Newman, Western Australia, with lead units at right, and distributed power units at left.

- Australia
  - BHP iron ore train has typically 268 cars and a train weight of 43,000 tonnes carrying 24,200 tonnes of iron ore, 2.8 km (1.7 mi) long, two SD70ACe locomotives at the head of the train and two remote controlled SD70ACe locomotives as mid-train helpers.
    - BHP used to run 44,500-tonne, 336-car long iron ore trains over 3 km (1.9 mi) long, with six to eight locomotives including an intermediate remote unit. This operation seems to have ceased since the trunk line was fully double tracked in May 2011.
  - Leigh Creek coal—2.8 km (1.7 mi), formerly ran as 161 wagons and three locomotives.
  - Cane tramway – 75 wagons (610 mm (2 ft) gauge).
- Brazil
  - Carajás Railway 1,600 mm (5 ft 3 in) gauge iron ore trains are typically 330 cars long, totaling 3 km (1.9 mi) in length.
  - VLI 1,600 mm (5 ft 3 in) Grain with 160 hopper cars, or 80 hoppers plus 72 FTTs (for pulp transport) totaling about 3.2 km (2.0 mi) long.
- China
  - Datong–Qinhuangdao railway is a dedicated coal-transport railway. Every day 50 pairs of 2.6 km (1.6 mi) long trains consisting of 210 wagons and two HXD1 locomotives use the line. Each train hauls over 20,000 tons of coal.
- Mauritania
  - Iron ore trains on the Mauritania Railway are up to 3 km (1.9 mi) in length. They consist of 2 diesel-electric EMD locomotives, 200 to 210 cars each carrying up to 84 tons of iron ore, and 2-3 service cars.
- South Africa
  - Sishen–Saldanha railway line ore trains on 1,067 mm (3 ft 6 in) – 4.1 km (2.5 mi)

== General ==
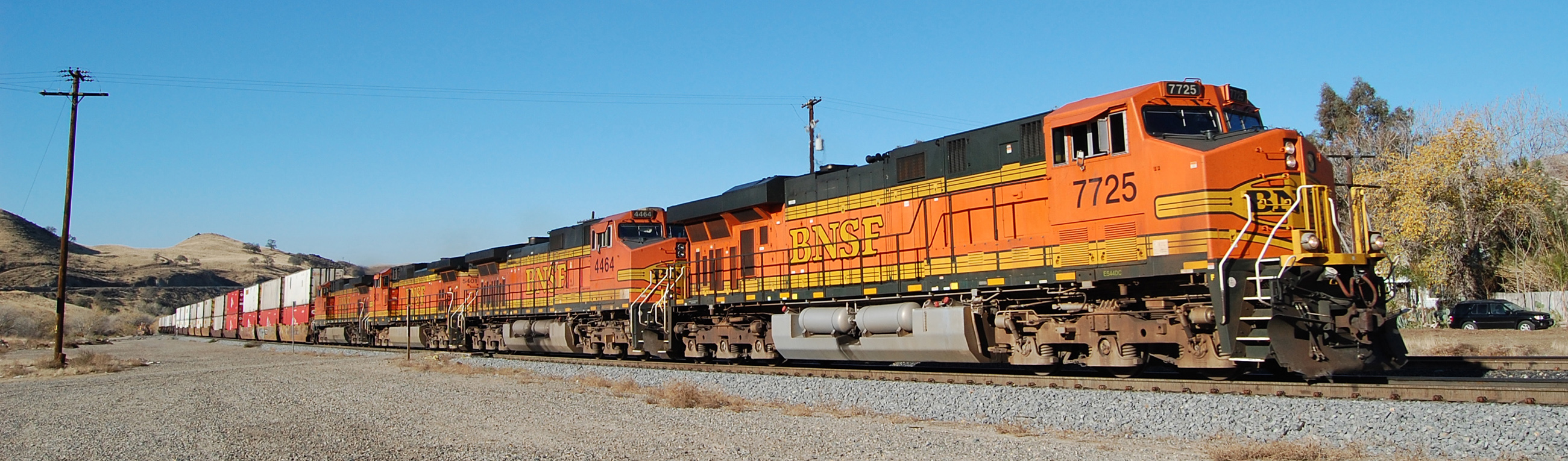
A BNSF train of loaded well cars (or double-stack cars) at Caliente, California, United States.

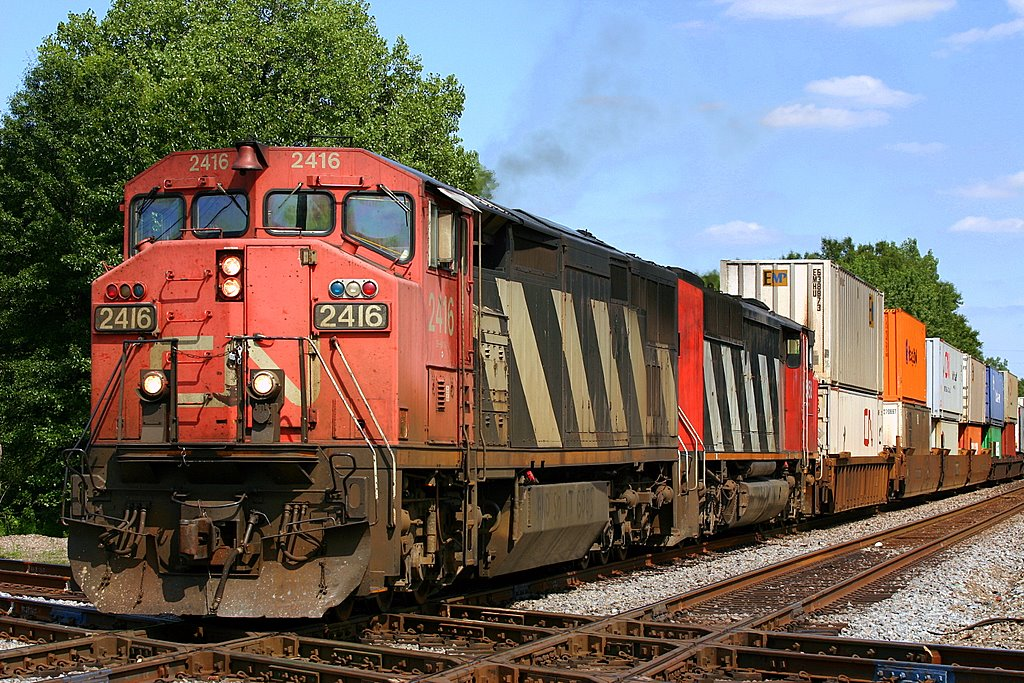
A Canadian National Railway double-stack container train.

- >5,000 metres (16,500 ft) – United States – BNSF Railway and Union Pacific Railroad (UP) regularly operate intermodal container trains exceeding 5,000 metres (16,500 ft) in length on main lines in the western United States. On the UP, these trains can stretch to over 6,100 metres (20,000 ft) with 5 locomotives and 280 well cars. Trains longer than 4,000 metres (13,200 ft) accounted for approximately 6% of BNSF's and 10% of UP's total train volume as of December 2024. The practice has drawn criticism due to concerns about blocked road crossings, which can cause delays for motorists and impede emergency response times. Railroads have argued that longer trains improve efficiency, lower emissions, and reduce the number of crossing activations, the most likely time for a collisions between a train and vehicles. According to the Association of American Railroads, fewer than 1% of trains in the United States exceed 4,300 metres (14,000 ft) in length.
- 1,222 metres (4,009 ft) – India – The Bangalore–Dharmavaram goods train
- 1,200 metres (3,900 ft) – United States – Auto Train, an Amtrak motorail service transporting passengers and their cars between the Washington, D.C. and Orlando regions. Typical consist includes 2 or 3 locomotives, 14 passenger cars and more than 23 autoracks for transporting vehicles.
- 1,000 metres (3,300 ft) – Saudi Arabia double stack
- 835 metres (2,740 ft) — In Denmark and to Hamburg, Germany; 2 locomotives and 82 wagons.

== Special test runs ==
These are one-off runs, sometimes specifically to set records.

=== Bulk (ore, coal etc) ===
- Sishen–Saldanha, South Africa. October 2026, a 7.6-kilometre (4.7 mi) train consisting of 12 locomotives hauling 696 empty wagons.
- On 21 June 2001, BHP ran a world record-breaking ore train on the 275 km (171 mi) 1,435 mm (4 ft 8 1/2 in) gauge line iron ore railway to Port Hedland in Western Australia. The train, comprising 682 wagons and hauled by eight 6,000 hp (4,500 kW) General Electric GE AC6000CW diesel-electric locomotives, was controlled by a single driver. The eight locomotives were distributed along its length to keep the coupling loads and curve performance controllable. The total length of the train was 7.352 km (4.568 mi) long, with a total weight 99,734 tons, which is the largest in the world. The train carried 82,000 metric tons of ore.
- Sishen–Saldanha, South Africa. Run on 26–27 August 1989, comprising 660 wagons, 7.302 kilometres (4.537 mi) long and a total weight of 71,765 tons on a 1,067 mm (3 ft 6 in) gauge line. The train comprised 16 locomotives (9 Class 9E 50 kV AC electric and 7 Class 37 diesel-electric).
- (United States) Norfolk and Western Railway unit coal train from Iaeger, West Virginia, to Portsmouth, Ohio, 15 November 1967. The train consisted of 500 cars and six EMD SD45 diesel-electric locomotives distributed throughout the train for a total weight of 48,170 tons and total length of 6.5 kilometres (4.0 mi).
- Bulk coal train from Ekibastuz to the Urals, Soviet Union, 20 February 1986. The train consisted of 439 wagons and several diesel locomotives distributed along the train with a total mass of 43,400 tonnes and a total length of 6.5 kilometres (4.0 mi).
- Indian Railways operated a freight train on 8 August 2025 termed as 'Rudrastra'. It is India's longest freight train, measuring at 4.5 km (2.8 mi) long. The train consisted of 354 wagons and powered by 7 WAG 9 locomotive. It ran between Ganjkhwaja to Garhwa Road, covering the 200-km route at an average speed of 45 km/h.
- Shuozhou–Huanghua railway is a heavy haul freight railway that has successfully tested 30,000 ton coal trains that stretch over 4 km (2.5 mi) in April 2024. The train consists of 324 cars wagons hauled with four China Energy Investment HXD1 variants.
- Datong–Qinhuangdao railway, China. On 2 April 2014, an experimental train ran with 320 wagons and six locomotives hauling a 31,500 ton load, with a total length of 3.971 km (2.467 mi).
- (India) Indian Railways operated a freight train on 15 August 2022 named The 'Super Vasuki' which was 3.5 km (2.2 mi) long had a total of 6 locomotives pulling 295 wagons of coal.
- Kereta Api Indonesia, Super Babaranjang, the test train consisted of 120 coal cars with 4 EMD G26 locomotives. The consist was roughly 1.7 km (1.1 mi) long.
- (United Kingdom) A 1991 test train pulled by two British Rail Class 59 diesel locomotives, weighing 12,108 tonnes and approximately 1.65 km (1.03 mi) long, was pulled with moderate success from Merehead Quarry to Witham Friary.

=== General cargo ===
- (France) SNCF, Intermediate locomotives in a 1,524 metres (5,000 ft) long train – trial
- (Netherlands) (Germany) trial trains 1,000 metres (3,300 ft)

=== Passenger ===
- (Australia) The Ghan is held to be the longest passenger train in regular service, operating weekly between Adelaide and Darwin. A typical configuration is 774 metres long, comprising 30 carriages and two locomotives. In peak periods the train can be up to 44 carriages long, with a length of 1,096 metres.
- Kijfhoek–Eindhoven, Netherlands. In 1989, the Nederlandse Spoorwegen (Dutch Railways) celebrated their 150th anniversary. On 19 February 1989, NS ran a test train with 60 passenger cars (1,602 metres (5,256 ft) long and weighing 2,597 tons), of which only the first 14 cars held actual passengers, pulled by one 1500 V DC locomotive. Twenty years later, in 2009, Railz Miniworld repeated the stunt on a smaller scale, inside their exhibition in Rotterdam.
- Ghent–Ostend, Belgium. On 27 April 1991, one electric locomotive and 70 passenger cars (totalling 1,733 m (5,685.70 ft) and 2786 tons, excluding the locomotive) held a charity run for the Belgian Cancer Fund, exceeding the Dutch record.
- Rhaetian Railway, Switzerland. On 29 October 2022, the Rhaetian Railway celebrated the 175th anniversary of Swiss railways with an hour-long, 25-kilometre (16 mi) journey from Preda to Alvaneu in southeast Switzerland. The train had 25 4-car ABe 4/16 "Capricorn" EMUs, totalling 100 coaches with a total length of 1,910 metres (6,270 ft); it ran on a narrow-gauge railway over several switchbacks and long curves.

== See also ==
- High-speed rail
- Track gauge
- Extreme Trains on the History Channel 2009
- List of steepest gradients on adhesion railways
- International Heavy Haul Association
- Longest road trains
