= China Railways HXD1 =

Class of Chinese electric locomotives

HXD1 和谐1型电力机车
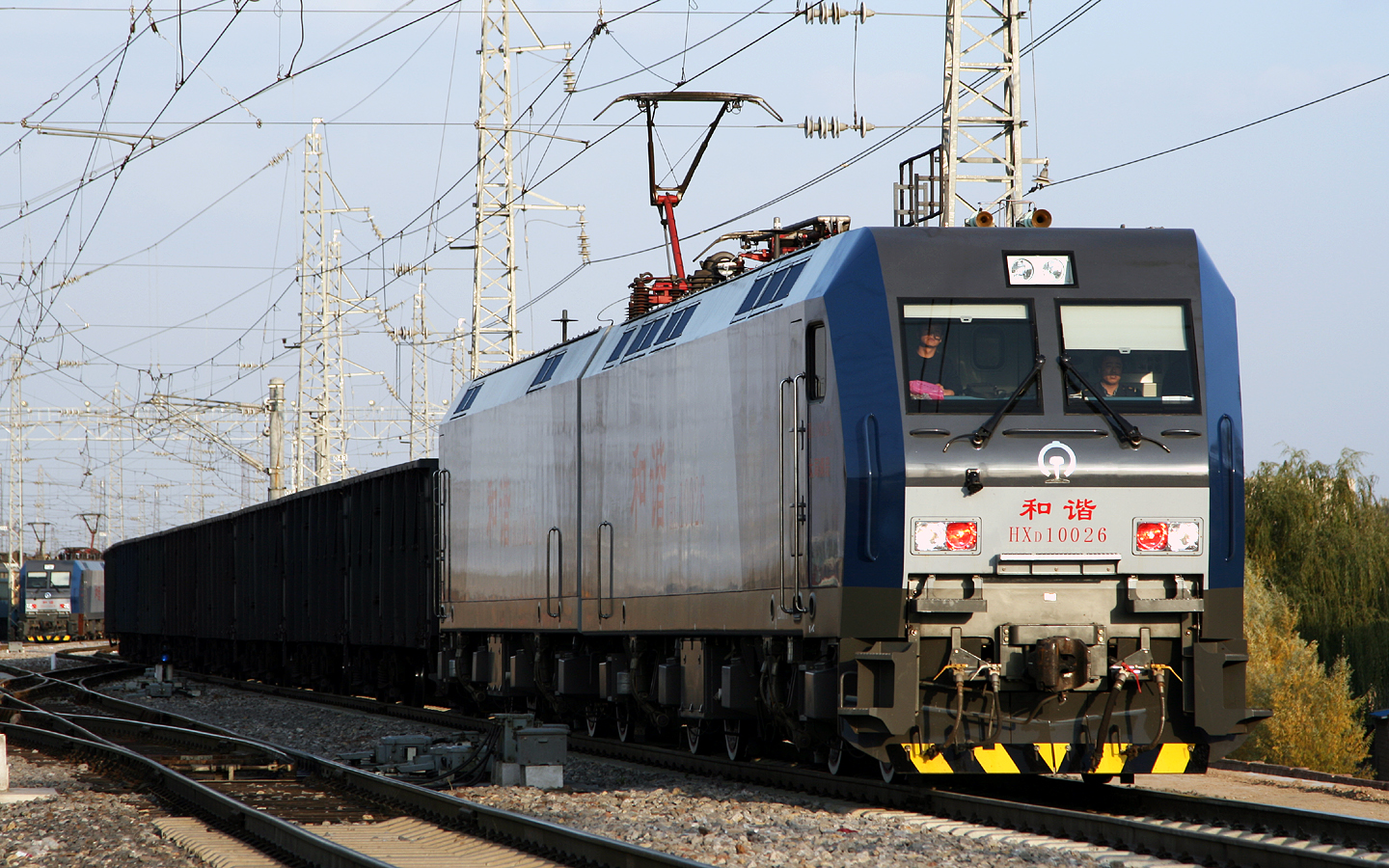
- HXD1-0026
Type and origin
- Power type: Electric
- Builder: CSR Zhuzhou Electric Locomotive, Siemens
- Build date: 2006–2012
- Total produced: 271
Specifications
- Configuration
  - UIC: 2 (Bo'Bo')
- Gauge: 1,435 mm (4 ft 8 1/2 in) standard gauge
- Wheel diameter: 1.250 m (49.21 in)
- Wheelbase: bogie centre distance 9 m (29 ft 6 3/8 in) bogie axle distance 2.8 m (9 ft 2 1/4 in)
- Length: 35.222 m (115 ft 6 3/4 in)
- Width: 3.247 m (10 ft 7 7/8 in)
- Loco weight: 184 t (181 long tons; 203 short tons) (200 t or 200 long tons or 220 short tons (Note: when ballasted to 25 t axleload for extra traction))
- Electric system/s: 25 kV 50 Hz AC Catenary
- Current pickup: Pantograph
- Loco brake: Pneumatic and dynamic
Performance figures
- Maximum speed: 120 km/h (75 mph)
- Power output: 9.6 MW (12,900 hp) (continuous)
- Tractive effort: max. 700 kN (160,000 lb_{f}) (μ =0.39) (760 kN or 170,000 lb_{f}) continuous 494 kN (111,000 lb_{f}) @70 km/h (43 mph)
- Brakeforce: Dynamic: (9.6 MW or 12,900 hp maximum) max.461 kN (104,000 lb_{f}) continuous 461 to 288 kN (104,000 to 65,000 lb_{f}) @75 to 120 km/h (47 to 75 mph)

The HXD1 (Chinese: 和谐1型电力机车) (also known as the DJ4) is a Chinese heavy-duty twin unit electric locomotive of axle configuration Bo'Bo'+Bo'Bo'. Both the HXD1 and HXD2 double unit locomotives were designated DJ4, the HXD2 units being disambiguated DJ4-6000.

The 7.34 billion Yuan order for 180 locomotives was given in 2004, with the first locomotive manufactured by November 2006. Production of the 180 locomotives in the class took place between 2006 and 2008. A second batch of 40 was delivered between 2009 and 2010.

In 2012, CSR began testing of a revised version of the locomotive, built by using higher levels of domestically sourced equipment. 50 units were delivered (1001 - 1050). Another unit (6001) was built at the end of 2012 by CSR Ziyang using Zhuzhou plans.

In 2013, CSR delivered 2 3xBo'Bo' to Shenhua Group (14.4 MW), directly derived from "normal" HXD1, but with a modernized driver cab. The same operator ordered 8 2xBo'Bo' in the first quarter 2013. These locomotives are dubbed the "Shenhua" Series.

In 2020, CRRC produced a 6xBo'Bo' for China Energy Investment the parent holding company of Shenhua Group. With a power output of 28.8 MW it is regarded as the worlds most powerful multi-segment electric locomotive. These locomotives are dubbed the "Shenhua 24" Series.

== Background and design ==
The HXD1 locomotives are based on the Siemens' EuroSprinter derived design of the China Railways DJ1 locomotive.

Construction of the locomotives was carried out by Zhuzhou Electric Locomotive Company Limited. Most variants of the locomotive consists of two identical single cab Bo'Bo' units coupled together, the main locomotive body is load bearing, electric traction equipment uses an AC/DC-AC transmission chain, with the traction motors being three phase asynchronous devices. The electrical inverter for traction motor power control is an IGBT type. The traction control system is a Siemens SIBAS32, units can also be operated in multiple using the Locotrol distributed traction control system.

The locomotive has a pneumatic disc brake, as well as being able to brake regeneratively. Standard operating speed is 70 km/h (43 mph) or 65 km/h (40 mph) when ballasted to 25 t axleload.

== Operations ==
The locomotives were built for heavy coal trains; in particular the Datong to Qinhuangdao line (Daqin Railway). On the Daqin line the twin unit locomotives typically operate in pairs and triplets, both double headed and distributed along the train.

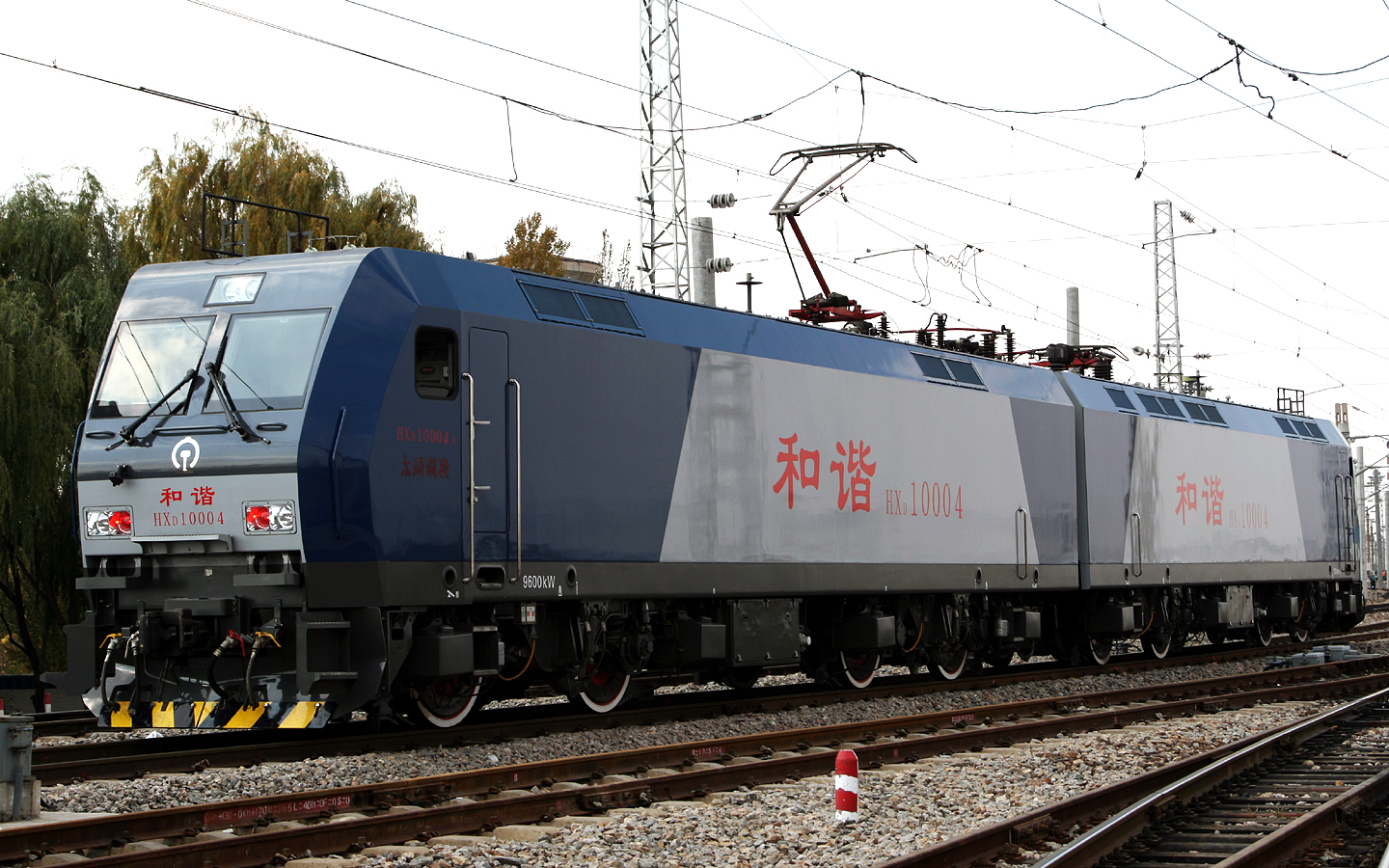
HXD1-0004

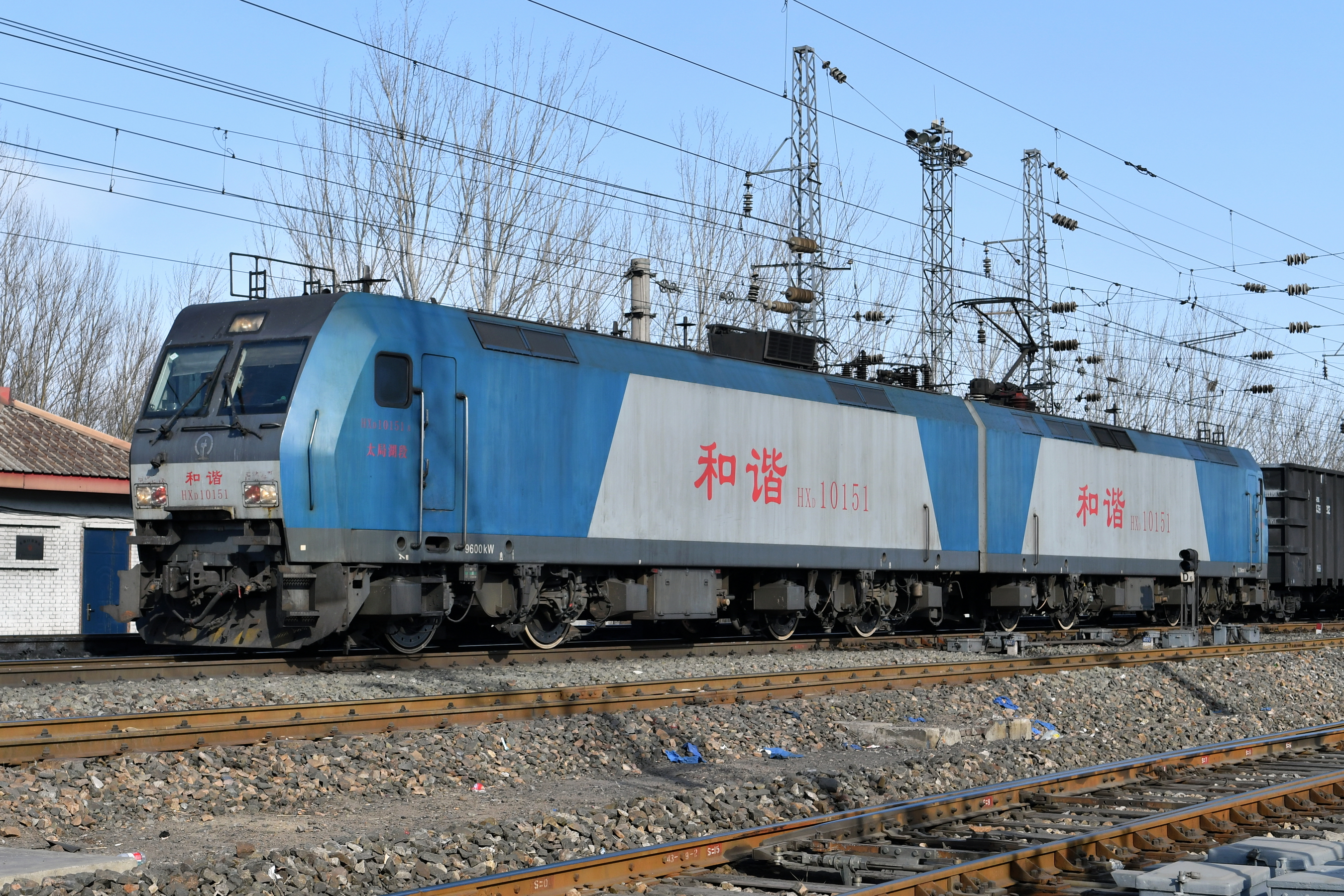
HXD1 at Datong–Qinhuangdao railway

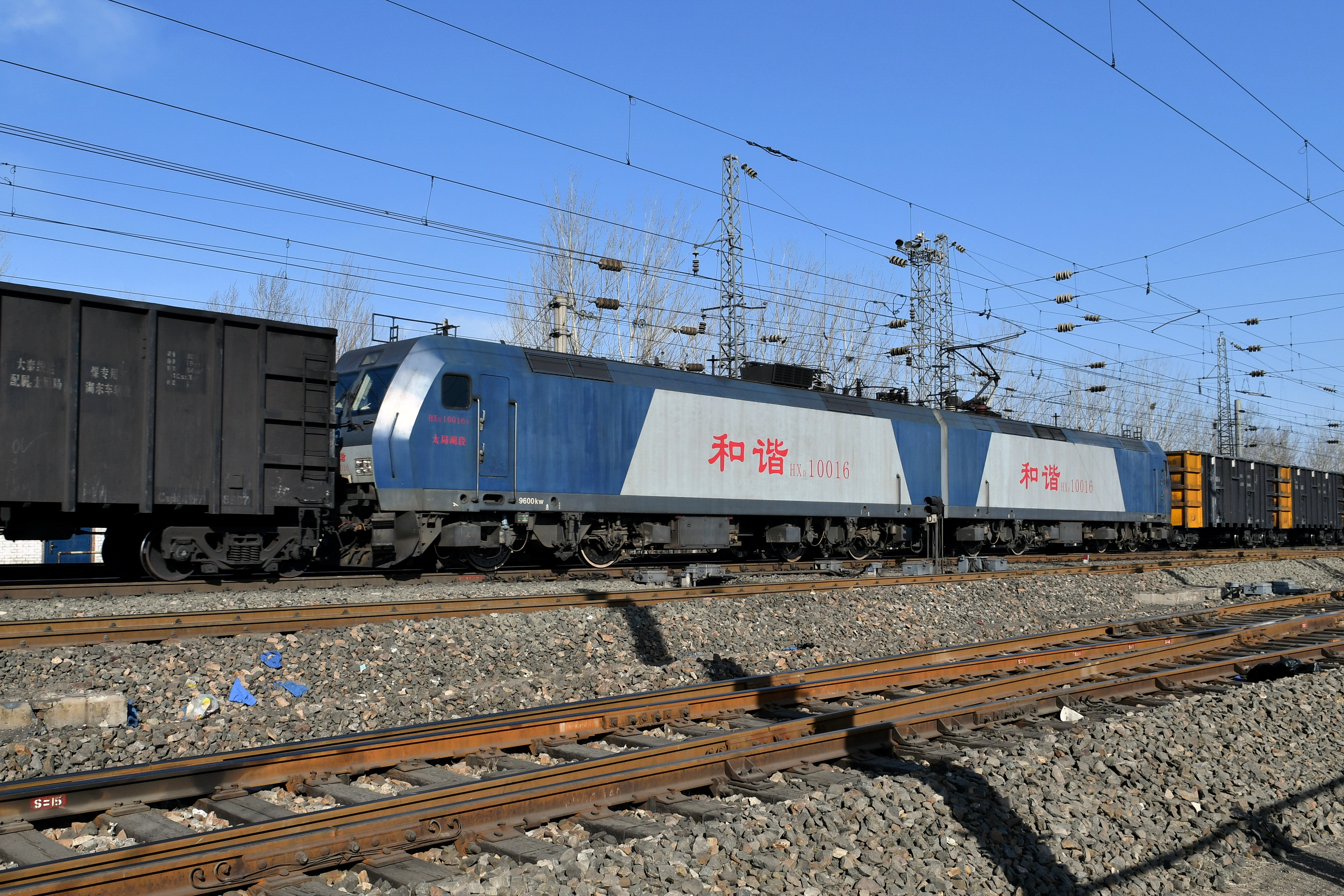
On the Daqin line the HXD1, both double headed and distributed along the train.

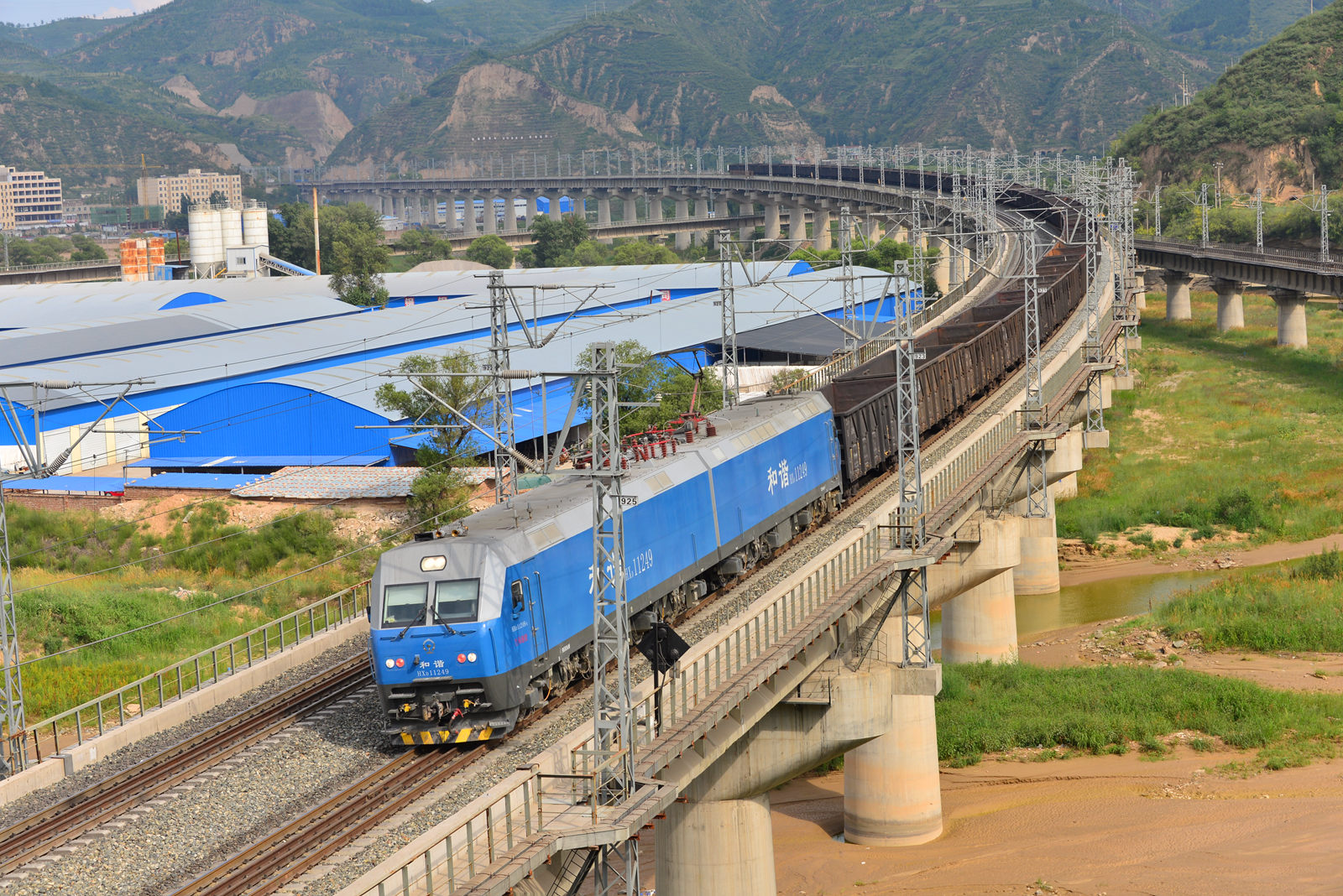
HXD1 (1000 Series) at Suide Town

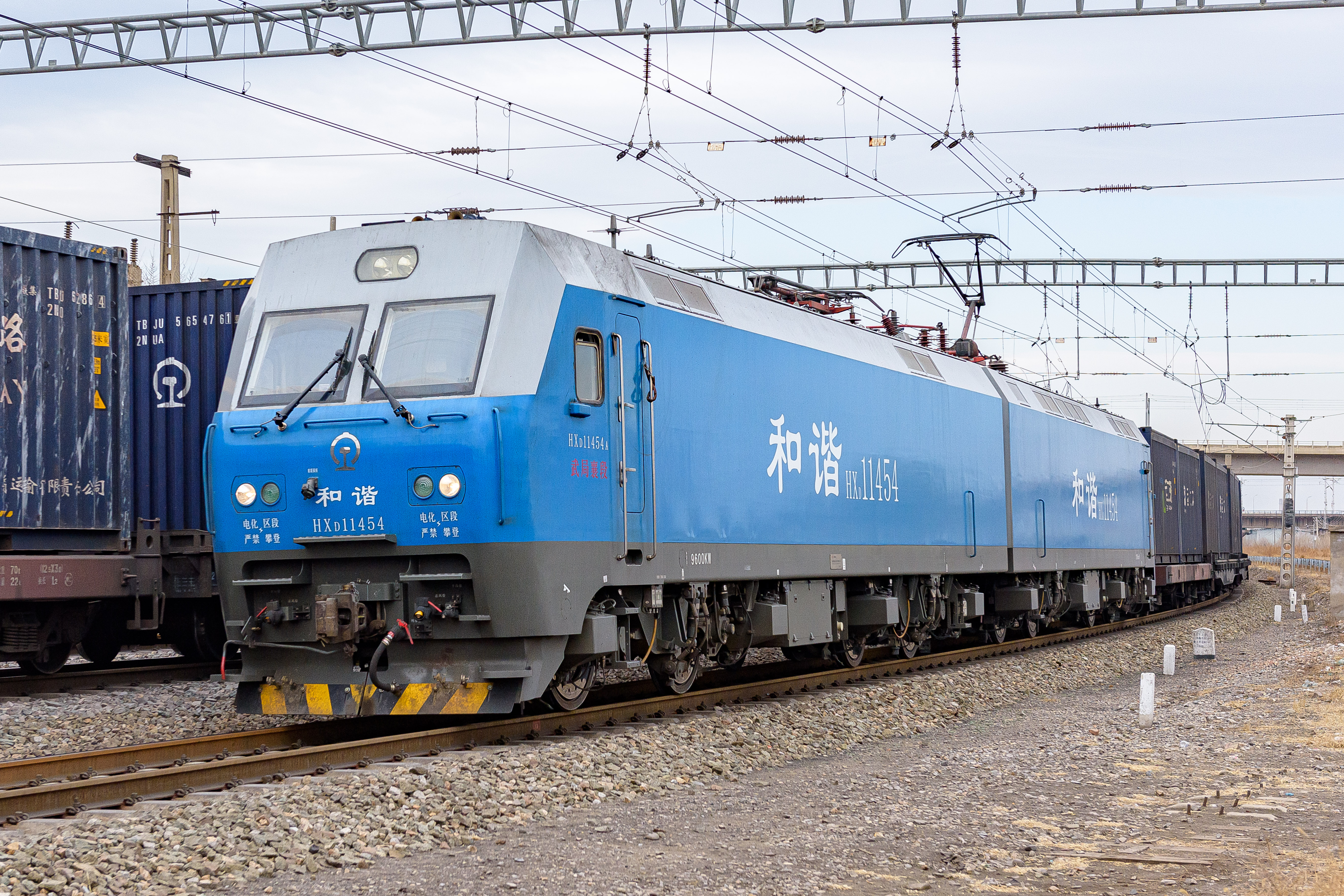
HXD1-1454 (1000 Series)

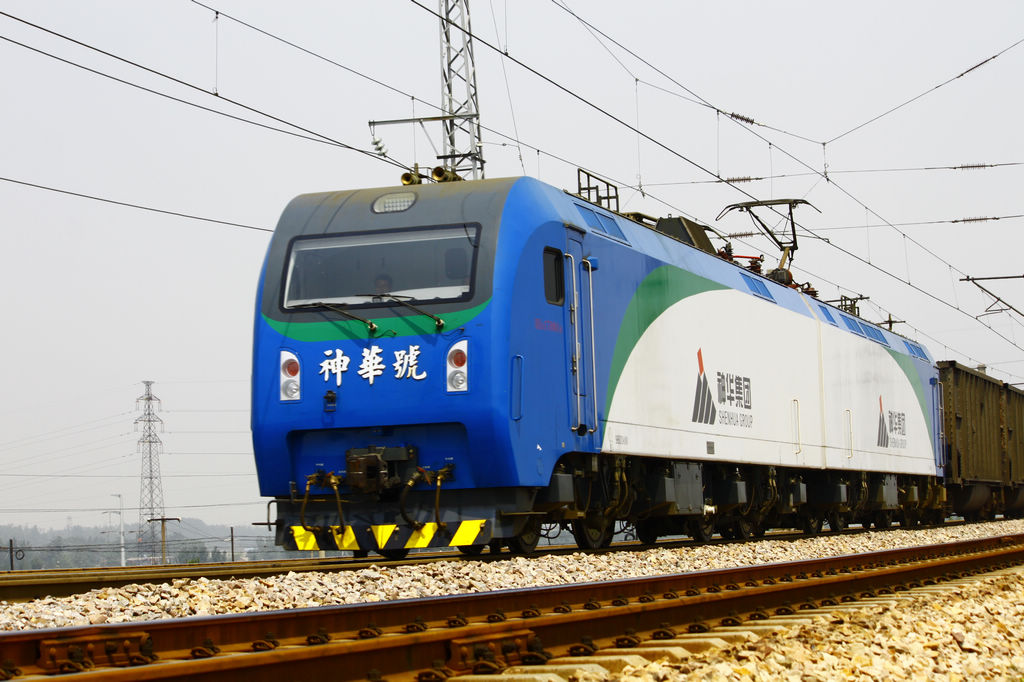
HXD1-7004 "Shenhua"(神华号)

== See also ==
- List of locomotives in China
