= Daqin Railway (company) =

Chinese railway company

Daqin Railway Company Limited
- Company type: public
- Traded as: SSE: 601006; CSI A100
- ISIN: CNE000001NG4
- Industry: Transportation
- Founded: 2004
- Headquarters: Datong, Shanxi; China
- Key people: Chairman: Mr. Wu Xun
- Products: Rail transport
- Owner: CR (61.70%)
- Number of employees: 40,388
- Parent: CR Taiyuan
- Website: daqintielu.com

Daqin Railway Co., Ltd. is a Chinese company that operates several railways with a total length of 1000 km, including the Daqin Railway and most assets on railway transportation of CR Taiyuan. The company is based in Datong, Shanxi. It was listed on the Shanghai Stock Exchange in 2006 with IPO capital raising of $1.9 billion US dollars.

Daqin Railway is a component of SSE 50 Index. The parent company of Daqin Railway was CR Taiyuan, a state-owned enterprise that the China Railway acted as its only shareholder.
