= China Railways DJ1 =

Class of Chinese electric locomotives

DJ1
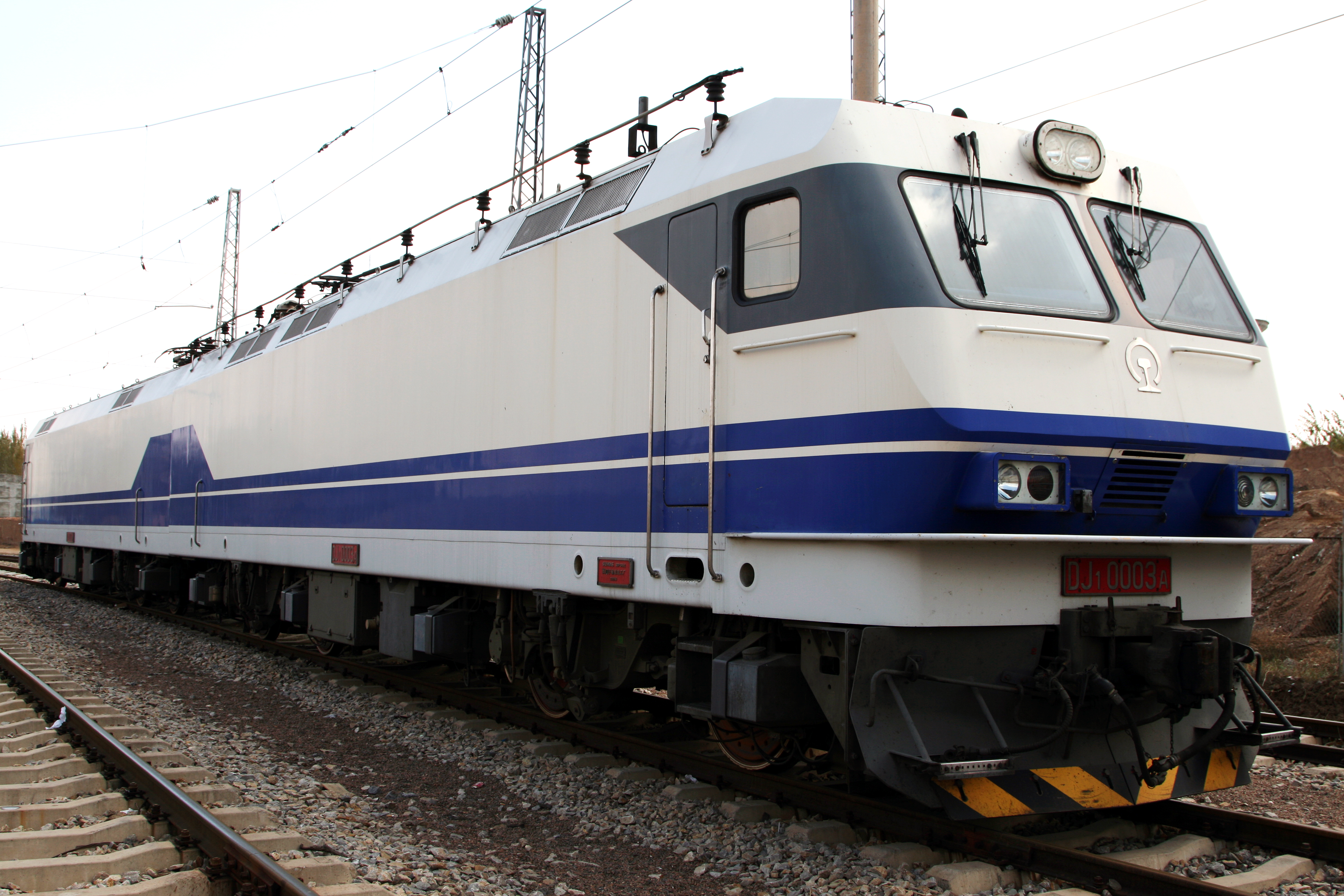
- DJ1-0003
Type and origin
- Power type: Electric
- Builder: Siemens / Zhuzhou Electric Locomotive Works
- Build date: 2001–2003
- Total produced: 20
Specifications
- Configuration
  - UIC: 2(Bo'Bo')
- Gauge: 1,435 mm (4 ft 8 1/2 in) standard gauge
- Wheel diameter: 1,250 mm (49.21 in)
- Wheelbase: bogie axle distance 2,800 mm (9 ft 2 1/4 in) bogie centre distance 9.000 m (29 ft 6 3/8 in)
- Length: 35.232 m (115 ft 7 1/8 in)
- Loco weight: 2×92 t (91 long tons; 101 short tons); 2 × 100 tonnes (98 long tons; 110 short tons)
- Electric system/s: 25 kV 50 Hz AC Catenary
- Current pickup: Pantograph
Performance figures
- Maximum speed: 120 km/h (75 mph)
- Power output: 2 x 3,200 kW (4,300 hp) continuous (at wheel); 8,200 kW or 11,000 hp peak, 10min.
- Tractive effort: starting 700 kN (160,000 lb_{f}), *760 kN (170,000 lb_{f}); 461 kN (104,000 lb_{f}) @ 50 km/h (14 m/s)
Career
- Operators: China Railway
- Sources : except where noted * Ballasted to 100t to improve traction

The China Railways DJ1 is a high power mainline electric freight locomotive built as a double locomotive unit of two nominally independent single cab units.

== History and design ==
The locomotives are based on a technology transfer agreement between Siemens and Zhuzou Electric locomotive works (ZELW). The first three locomotives were built by Siemens in Austria, and the remaining 17 were built in China.

The electrical components in the locomotive are based upon Siemens' EuroSprinter design (second generation using water-cooled GTO inverters). The traction motors are asynchronous AC type, and are nose suspended on the axle, regenerative electric braking is possible with a braking force of approximately 460 kN (100,000 lb_{f}), and an electric braking power of 6.4 MW (8,600 hp), overall efficiency of the machine is more than 85%.

3 of the units were manufactured by Siemens in Austria, the remaining 17 in China; the first locomotive was produced in 2001. The first china manufactured unit was produced in 2002. Production of the locomotive ended in 2003.

The locomotives were used to haul coal trains on the Daqin line.

As more powerful locomotive models HXD1 and HXD2 entered Daqin line since 2006, the 20 DJ1s were allocated to Xi'an Railway Bureau to haul freight trains running between Baoji and Qinling.

== See also ==
- List of locomotives in China
- China Railways HXD1 successor locomotive
