= Locotrol =

Locomotive technology

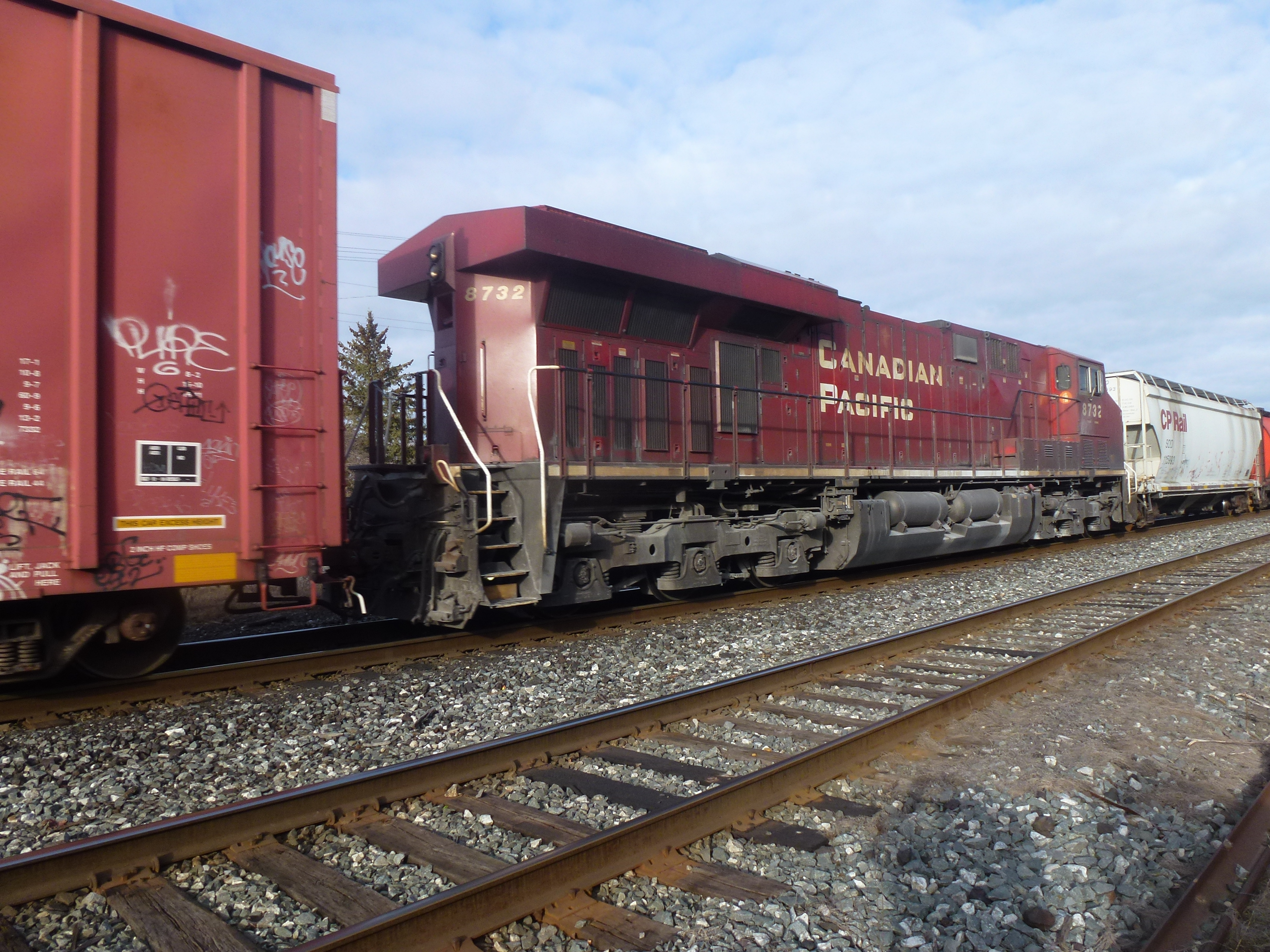
A mid-train locomotive controlled remotely through Locotrol from the lead locomotive, which means no crew is needed on this locomotive.

Locotrol is a product of Wabtec Corporation that permits railway locomotives to be distributed throughout the length of a train (distributed power). It is installed on more than 20,000 locomotives around the world, sending signals from the lead locomotive and via radio to the remote control locomotives.

== History ==
Locotrol was developed in the 1960s by an Ohio telephone and electronics manufacturer, North Electric Company. The technology was later purchased by GE-Harris Railway Electronics predecessor Harris Controls Systems Division of Harris Corporation. The electronics were mounted in a separate railcar, but have since been miniaturised into relatively small cabinets with much of the functionality contained in software. Early Locotrol customers included the Southern Railway, Norfolk & Western Railway, Detroit Edison, Canadian Pacific and Australia's Mount Newman Mining and Queensland Rail. Today numerous railroads use Locotrol, with systems deployed globally numbering in the thousands.

Since 1975, both Queensland Rail and Mount Newman railway in Australia have used the system on coal and iron ore trains, permitting the doubling in the size of trains without exceeding draw-gear strength, through the use of mid-train locomotives. Westrail introduced Locotrol working in 1996, also with retrofitted equipment. In June 2001 BHP Iron Ore in the Australian Pilbara set a record for the longest train with 682 ore cars and eight distributed GE AC6000CW locomotives in a 2-168-2-168-2-168-1-178-1 configuration. BNSF and Union Pacific are major North American Locotrol operators.

== Features ==
Originally an aftermarket product, the system is also available as an option on new locomotives. Distributed power itself was not a new concept, but it required an extra train crew to be located in the middle of the train. Two modes of operation can be used: synchronous where all locomotives operate in unison, or independent mode where part of the train heading upgrade can be powering, while the other half can be braking on the downgrade. Most systems use lead and middle of train locomotives, but up to four consists can be controlled from the lead unit.

== See also ==
- Distributed power
- Remote control locomotive
