= Datong–Qinhuangdao railway =

Railway line in China

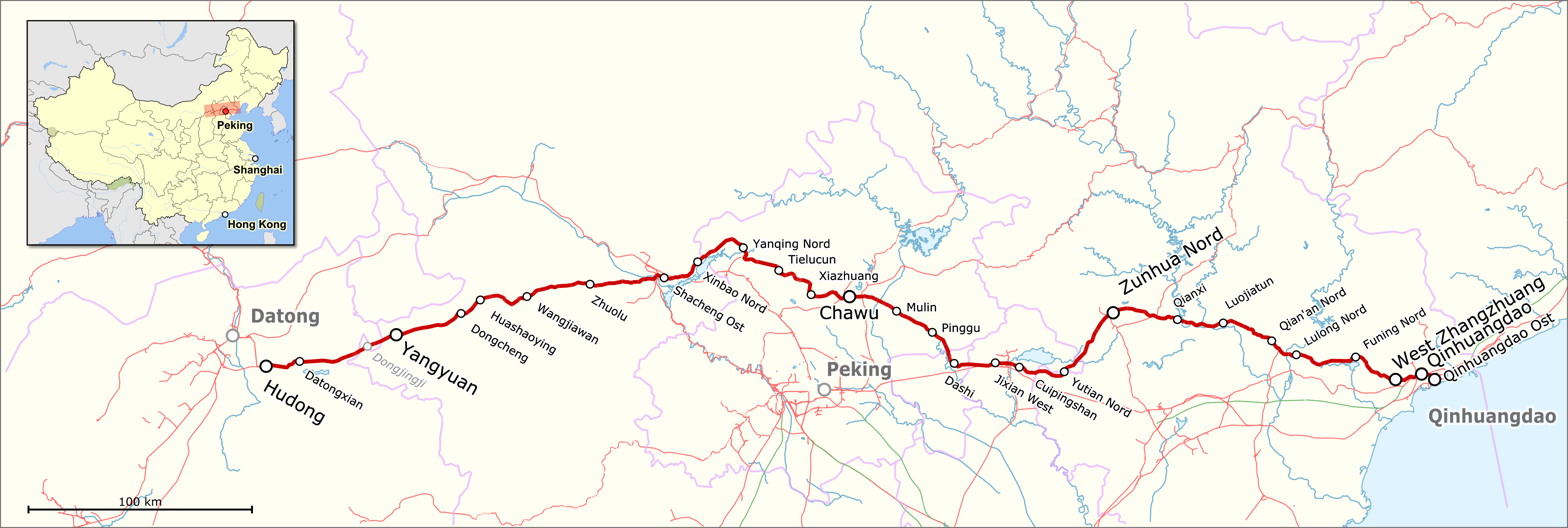
- Map of Datong–Qinhuangdao railway

Overview
- Native name: 大秦铁路
- Status: In operation
- Locale: Shanxi, Hebei, Beijing, Tianjin
- Termini: Datong; Port of Qinhuangdao
- Stations: 37

Service
- Type: Heavy rail
- System: China Railway
- Operator: Daqin Railway Co., Ltd.

History
- Opened: 21 December 1992

Technical
- Line length: 653 km (406 mi)
- Number of tracks: 2 (Double-track)
- Track gauge: 1,435 mm (4 ft 8 1/2 in) standard gauge
- Electrification: 25 kV 50 Hz AC (Overhead line)
- Operating speed: 120 km/h (75 mph)
- Signalling: ABS

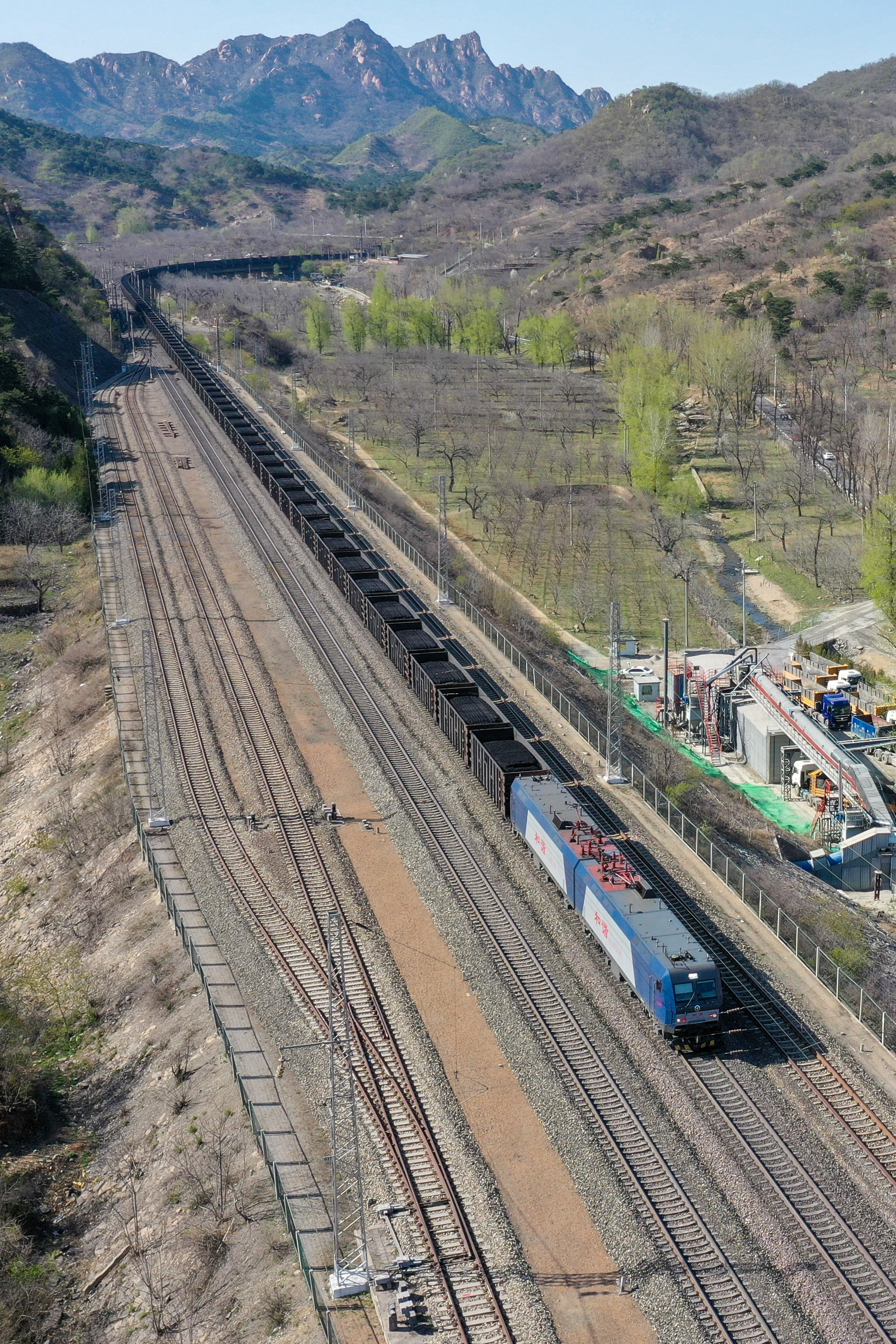
HXD1 locomotives and open wagons are heading east along the Daqin railway.

Datong–Qinhuangdao railway or Daqin railway (simplified Chinese: 大秦铁路; traditional Chinese: 大秦鐵路; pinyin: Dàqín tiělù), also known as the Daqin line (simplified Chinese: 大秦线; traditional Chinese: 大秦線; pinyin: Dàqín xiàn), is a 653 km coal-transport railway in north China. Its name is derived from its two terminal cities, Datong, a coal mining center in Shanxi province, and Qinhuangdao in Hebei province, on the Bohai Sea.

The electrified double track line serves as a major conduit for moving coal produced in Shanxi, Shaanxi, and Inner Mongolia to Qinhuangdao, China's largest coal-exporting seaport, from there coal is shipped to south China and other countries in Asia.

The railway also passes through the municipalities of Beijing and Tianjin. Unlike most other railways in China, which are run by the state-owned China Railway Corporation, the Daqin railway is operated by Daqin Railway Company Limited, a publicly traded stock company.

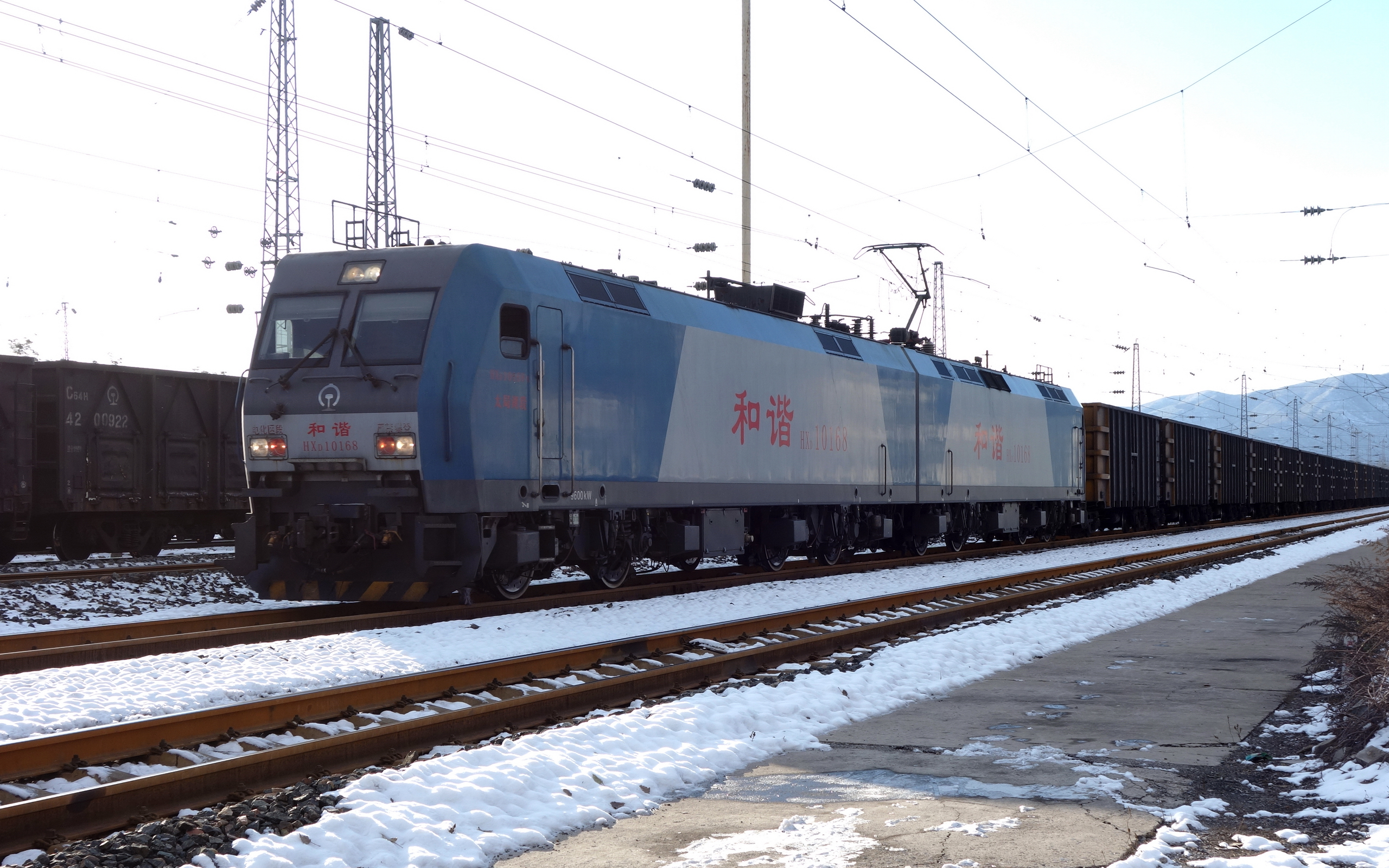
On the Datong–Qinhuangdao line the HXD1 locomotives

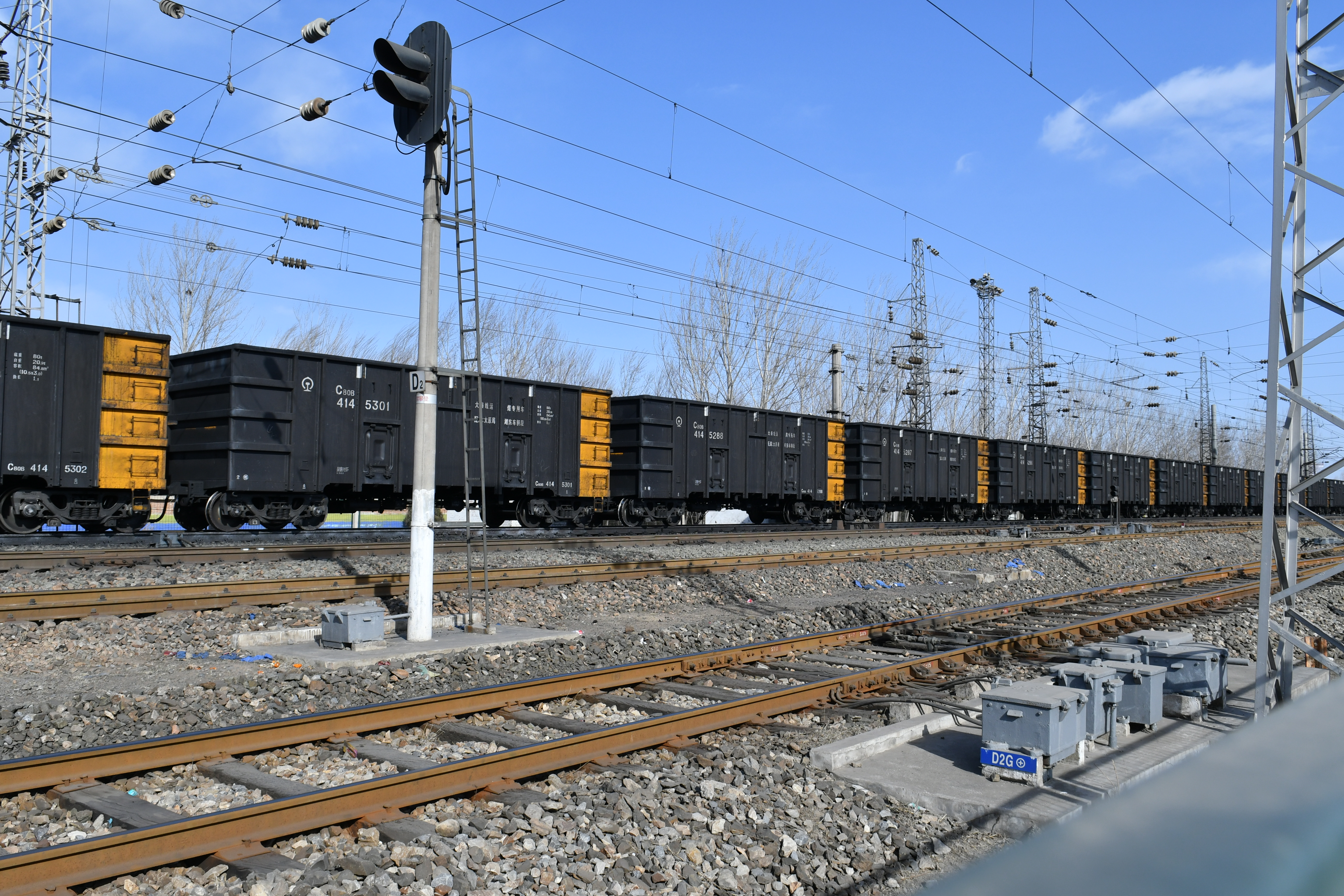
C80B open wagon at Datong–Qinhuangdao railway

Daqin railway carries over 1/5th of the coal transported by rail in China, more coal than any other railway line in China and the world.

The line was constructed in two phases between December 1984 and December 1992, with specifications changed from single-track to double-track during construction. Design capacity was 100 million tonnes a year, which it reached after ten years, but continuous upgrades (wider subgrade, 75 kg/m rails, wagons with higher capacity and top speed, longer trains and stronger locomotives, radio operation and centralised traffic control, automatic train inspection) quadrupled capacity.

In 2006, powerful locomotive models HXD1 and HXD2, with 9.6 MW and 10 MW power output respectively, entered Daqin line to replace the older DJ1 models.

Year	Coal Transportation Volume (metric tons)
...	
1995	20 million
...	
2000	60.52 million
...	
2002	100 million
2003	120 million
2004	153 million
2005	203 million
2006	250 million
2007	300 million
2008	340 million
2009	330 million
2010	401 million
2011	440 million
...	
2018	451 million
...	
2021	420 million
...	
2023	422 million

== Accidents and incidents ==
24 August 2020 - Four cars of a train derailed near Zhuolu railway station in Zhuolu County, Hebei province. No casualties were reported.

14 April 2022 - 17 cars of a freight train derailed after colliding with a parked locomotive near Cuipingshan railway station in Jizhou District, Tianjin, 11 of which fell off from the elevated railway. No casualties or injuries have been reported.

== See also ==
- Coal energy in China
- List of railways in China
- Rail transport in the People's Republic of China
