= Shuozhou–Huanghua railway =

Railway line in China

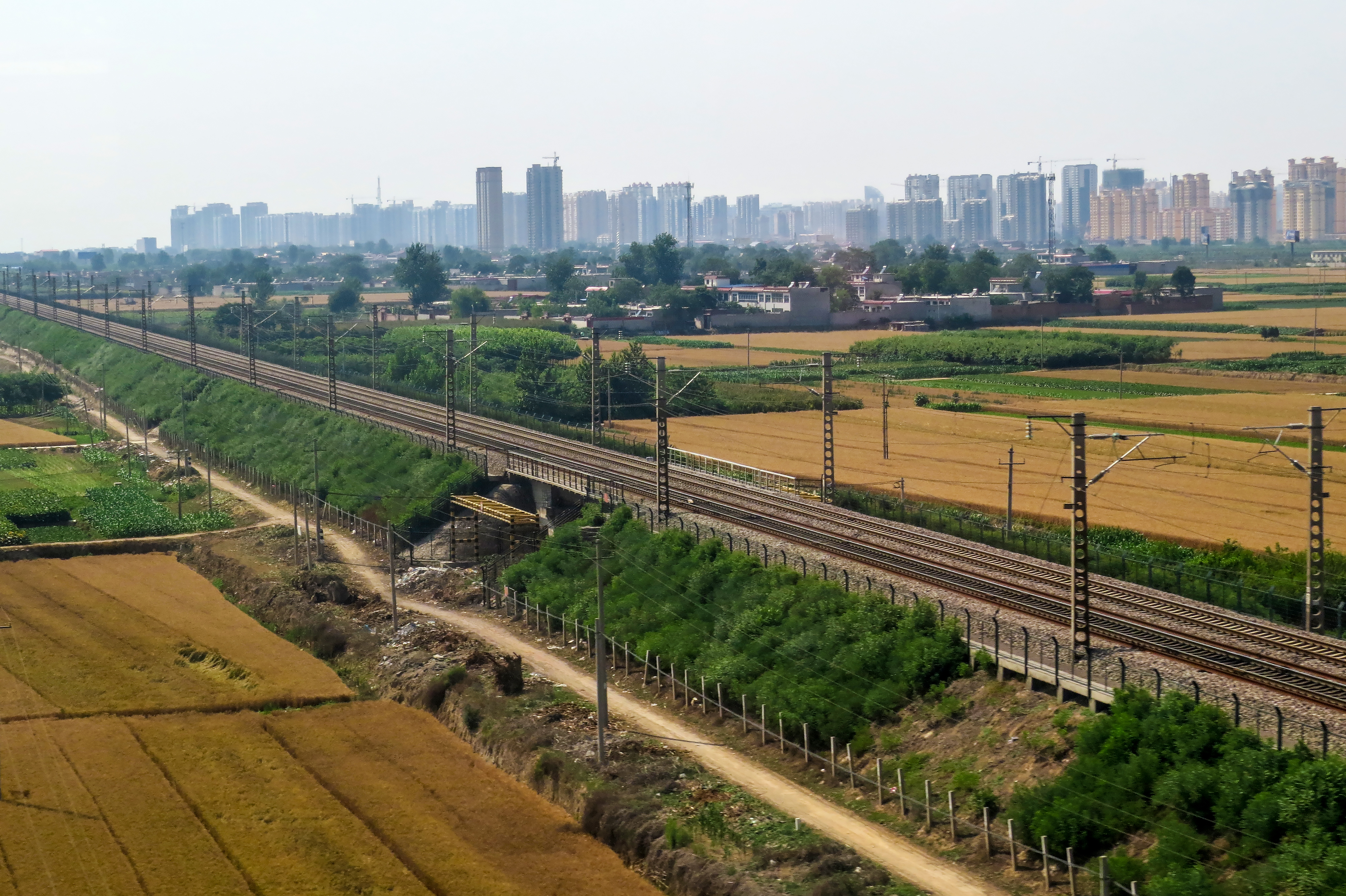

Overview
- Native name: 朔黄铁路
- Status: Operational
- Termini: Shenchi; Gangkou

Service
- Type: Heavy rail

History
- Opened: May 18, 2000 (Shenchi–Suning); 2001 (Suning–Huanghua)

Technical
- Line length: 379 km (235 mi)
- Track gauge: 1,435 mm (4 ft 8 1/2 in) standard gauge
- Electrification: 50 Hz 25,000 V

The Shuozhou–Huanghua railway (Chinese: 朔黄铁路) is a double-track electrified railway in China. It is used for the transportation of coal.

== History ==
The line was jointly funded by Shenhua Group, Hebei province, and the Ministry of Railways. Construction began in November 1997. The section from Shenchi to Suning opened on 18 May 2000. The section from Suning to Huanghua port opened in October 2001.

== Specification ==
From its western terminus at Shenchi South to its eastern terminus at Gangkou, the railway travels 588 kilometres (365 mi) and descends 1,527 metres (5,010 ft).
