= International Heavy Haul Association =

The International Heavy Haul Association is an association of Heavy Haul railways.

== Members ==
Members as at October 2021 comprised:

=== Australia ===
- Aurizon
- Rio Tinto

=== Brazil ===
- Vale

=== Canada ===
- Iron Moustache Consulting
- Railway Association of Canada

=== China ===
- China Academy of Railway Sciences
- China Railway

=== France ===
- International Union of Railways

=== India ===
- Indian Railways
- Ministry of Railways

=== Norway ===
- Nordic Heavy Haul Association

=== Russia ===
- Russian Railway Research Institute

=== South Africa ===
- Transnet Freight Rail

=== Sweden ===
- Nordic Heavy Haul Association

=== United States ===
- Transportation Technology Center
