= Distributed power =

Locomotive power distribution within a train

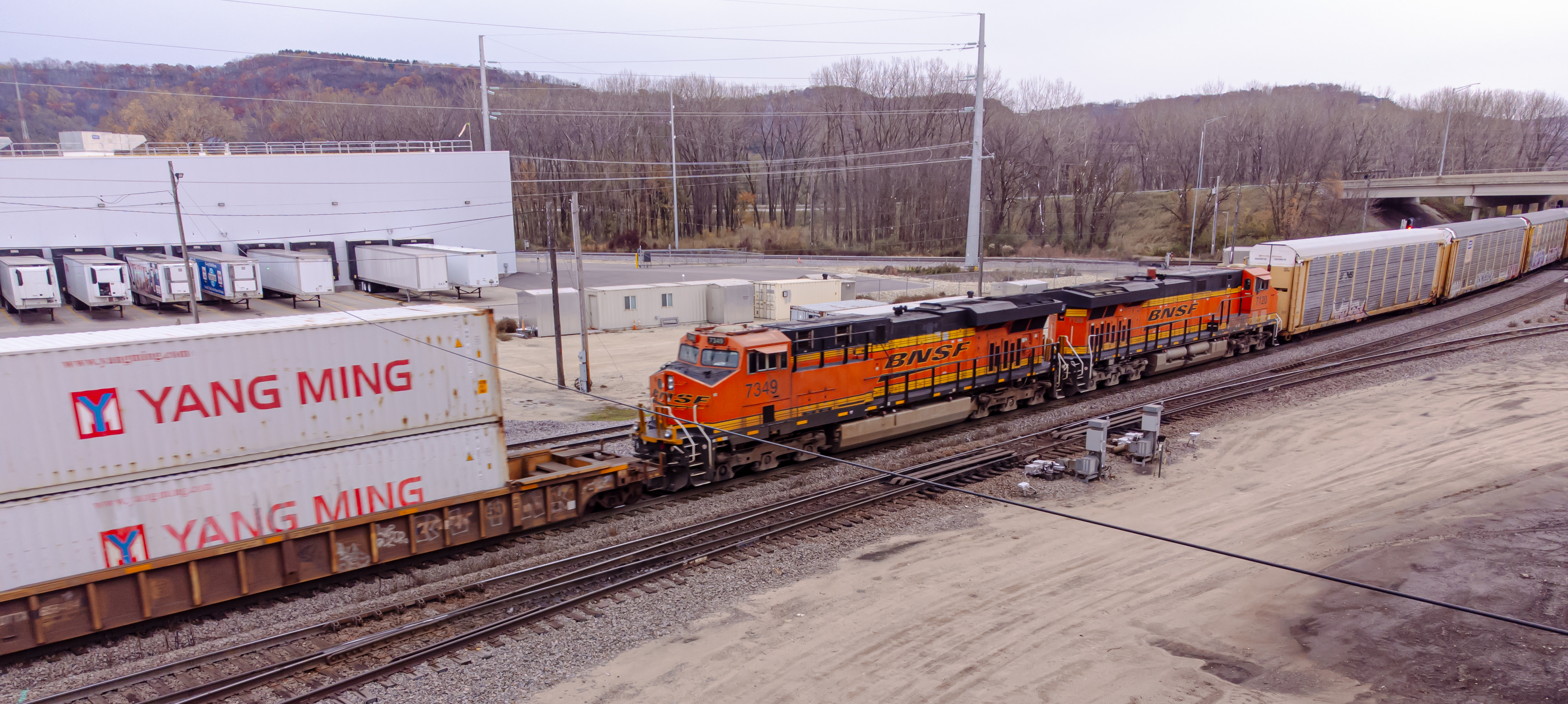
Distributed power on the BNSF Railway with intermodal well cars on the front half and autoracks on the back half

In rail transport, distributed power (DP) is a generic term referring to the physical distribution—at intermediate points throughout the length of a train—of separate motive power groups. Such "groups" may be single units or multiple consists, and are remotely controlled from the leading locomotive. The practice allows locomotives to be placed anywhere within the length of a train when standard multiple-unit (MU) operation is impossible or impractical. DP can be achieved by wireless (RF connectivity) or wired (trainlined) means. Wired systems now provided by various suppliers use the cabling already extant throughout a train equipped with electronically controlled pneumatic brakes (ECP).

== History ==
Since the 1960s, railroad distributed power technology has been dominated by one company, Harris Controls (originally Harris Corporation—Controls & Composition Division, later purchased by General Electric—the division now known as GE Transportation), which has manufactured and marketed a patented radio-control system with the trade-name of Locotrol, which is the predominant wireless DP system in use around the world today.

With its origins in the early days of SCADA technology for the remote control of pipelines and electric utilities, and from an early concept of Southern Railway President D.W. Brosnan, Locotrol was a product of the North Electric Company (Galion, Ohio, United States), which was later purchased by Radiation Inc. (Melbourne, Florida, United States) and—in turn—purchased by Harris Corporation (also headquartered in Melbourne). The nascent technology was first tested on the Southern Railway in 1963, and the first production systems were installed on the Southern Railway in 1965.

== Advantages and disadvantages ==
The greatest benefit of distributed power—and the reason for development of the original concept—is the reduction of draw-gear draft forces, permitting a wholesale increase in the size of trains without exceeding draw-gear strength, through the use of mid- or end-of-train locomotives. There are also potential train-handling benefits. Over an undulating track profile, a skilful operator can manipulate the relative power outputs (as well as dynamic- and air-brake applications) to minimize run-in and run-out of coupler slack throughout the train.

Reduced draft forces along a train reduce the lateral force between wheel and rail on curves, thus reducing fuel consumption and wear on various running-gear components as well as the potential for a stringline derailment.

Another benefit is quicker application of air brakes. With all braking control on a conventional train being established at the head-end, it can take several seconds for brake pipe pressure changes initiated by the operator to propagate along the train. Under radio-controlled DP operation, the brakes are set at remote locomotives almost simultaneously with the command initiated on the lead locomotive, providing a more uniform air brake response throughout the train.

The main disadvantage is the operational time needed, and track configuration required, to add and remove additional locomotive units. Secondary disadvantages are the costs associated with equipping locomotives with the extra control apparatus and the potential for the intermittent loss of the telemetry signal. This latter is known as "communication interrupt" and is coped with by fail-safe software program inclusions.

== Technology ==
Distributed power should not be confused with multiple-unit operation, which is a capability, generally found on all main-line and some switching locomotives, that connects multiple locomotives directly together via MU cables and air brake control lines. MU operation in North America is designed so that any two locomotives so equipped, and regardless of age and manufacturer, can be coupled together and operated as a single locomotive by one operator in the cab of the lead unit. This is accomplished via a 27-pin MU cable and the connection of three additional air lines separate from the brake pipe (sometimes also called the "train line"). DP is an entirely separate arrangement to control locomotives that are physically separated from the lead unit(s) and therefore impossible to connect via multiple-uniting.

The first locomotive at the head of the train is called the "lead unit", and "remote units" can be located at separate positions throughout the train. Each DP remote unit can be MU-connected to other units at that position to provide one or more "remote consists".

The setup and linking of the DP lead and remote units is fairly straightforward, and the air brakes of the remote units also have to be properly configured to enable the system to function correctly. The system automatically chooses an available frequency during the linking process so that other DP trains nearby are unaffected. In a crowded yard or in hilly or mountainous terrain, it is not uncommon for the link to be temporarily lost.

As long as there is not an emergency or penalty brake application that eliminates the link, the system will reconnect automatically or the operator can attempt to reconnect manually. Originally the loss of connection would result in the remote units remaining in their last-commanded throttle or dynamic braking position. Later system versions and software updates typically reduce the remote unit power setting to Notch 4 by default if the link is lost.

Although the DP signals from lead to remote units (and vice versa) are nominally instantaneous, in reality it generally takes at least a few seconds for a remote unit to respond to a signal from the lead and for the change in status to show up on the DP display in the lead locomotive cab.

Distributed power originally could be provided at only one intermediate location within a train. These forerunner systems (Locotrol 102-105 and Locotrol II) required a radio-relay car to be attached via standard MU jumper cabling to the remote locomotive(s) to provide the radio-control commands and to facilitate feedback signals. Later, Locotrol II evolved into the "Universal" system in which the radio-control equipment could be installed on the locomotives themselves. With this option, the relay car — variously referred to as an RCU (remote control unit) or LRC (locomotive remote control) — was rendered redundant.

Locotrol III was the next development, compatible with both the Knorr-Bremse/New York Air Brake CCB and Wabtec's EPIC electronic locomotive brake equipment, and permitting multiple remote unit locations. The latest incarnation of this equipment is LEB (Locotrol Electronic Brake), which integrates the GE Locotrol technology with K-B/NYAB's CCBII brake.

== Users ==
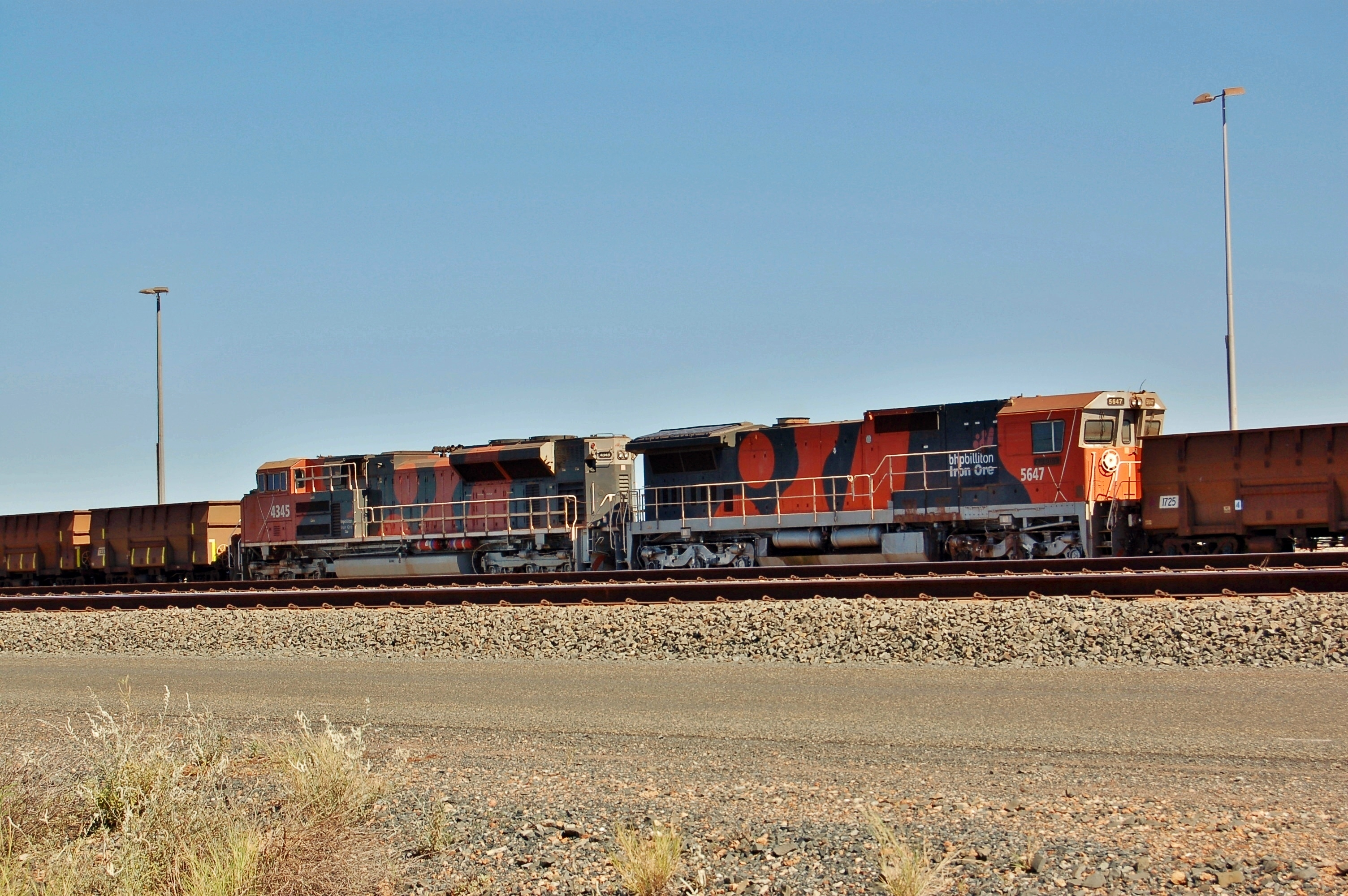
BHP Billiton Iron Ore EMD SD70ACe No. 4345 (left) and GE CM40-8 No. 5647 Abydos (right), marshalled as distributed power units, in a loaded iron ore train at Nelson Point yard, Port Hedland, Western Australia, April 2012.

Distributed power is used in the United States, Canada, China, Australia, Brazil, Germany, Russia and South Africa. It is also (or has been) in regular unit-train operation in India, Mauritania, and Mexico, and almost made it into operation in both pre- and post-revolutionary Iran.

Distributed power in a wired configuration (using the ECP trainline) is becoming increasingly common in North American and Australian heavy-haul unit-train operations.

== Other similar operations ==
Top and tail is a phrase used to describe an operation where there is a locomotive at each end of the train, usually to make it easier to change direction at a terminal location where it is not possible to run the motive power around the train (i.e. swap the locomotives from one end of the train to the other); this arrangement is not used specifically to operate longer or heavier trains. Top-and-tail operation is not generally utilised with distributed power, although such a configuration could be used as such.

The description should not be confused with push-pull, which refers specifically to a train configuration (usually associated with passenger trains) in which the motive power is located at one end of the train only. In this latter configuration, the train can be operated from the non-powered end by an operator's control position (the cab-car) at that end of the train.

== Distributed traction ==
In a distributed traction system there are no locomotives but power is distributed along the train by multiple traction motors. An electric multiple unit is an example of this system.

== See also ==
- Remote control locomotive
