= Remote control locomotive =

Type of railway locomotive

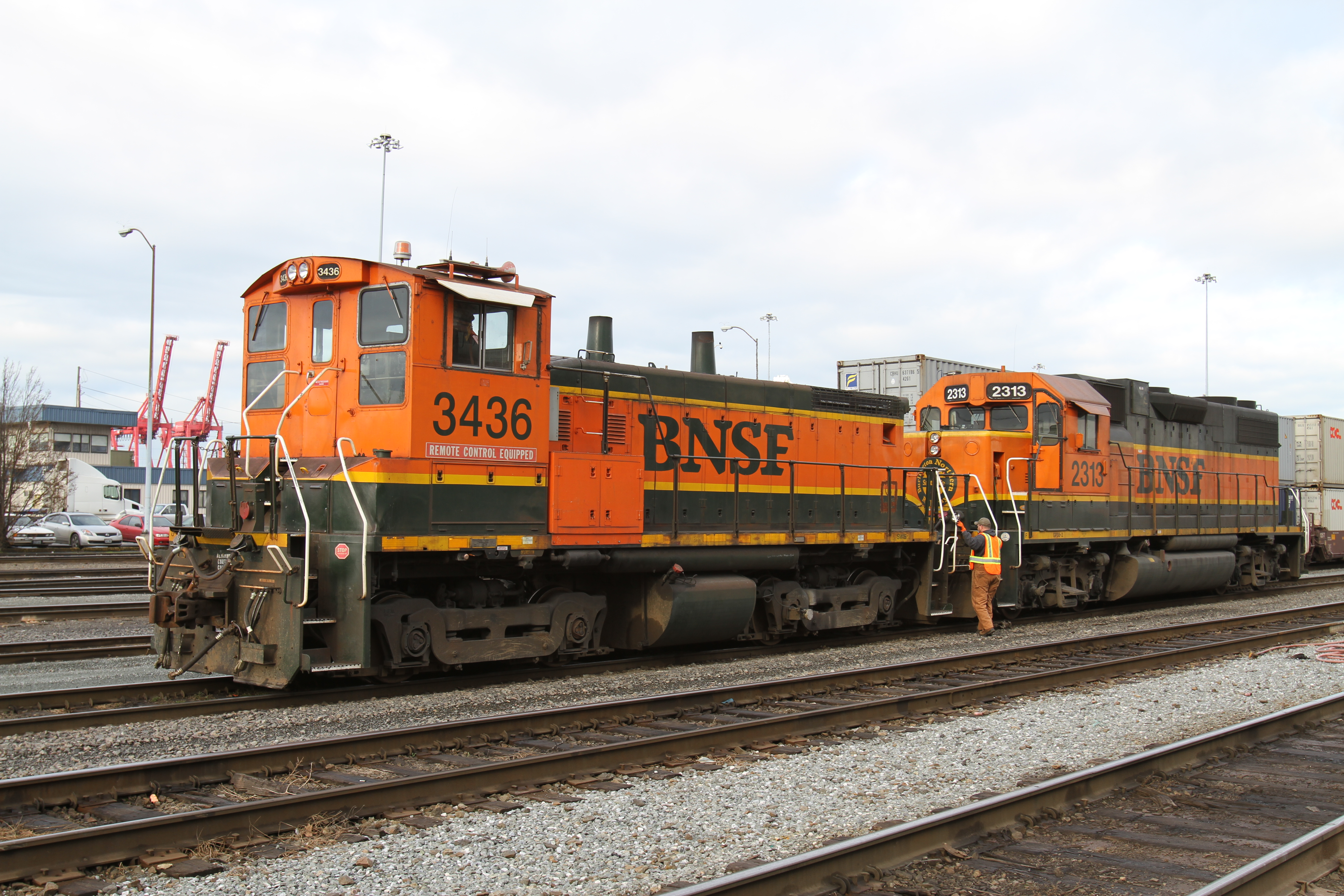
A remote control EMD SW1500 switcher locomotive operated by BNSF Railway. Note the strobe light above the cab and signage

A remote control locomotive (also called an RCL) is a railway locomotive that can be operated with a remote control. It differs from a conventional locomotive in that a remote control system has been installed in one or more locomotives within the consist, which uses either a mechanical or radio transmitter and receiver system. The locomotive is operated by a person not physically at the controls within the locomotive cab. They have been in use for many years in the railroad industry, including industrial applications such as bulk material load-out, manufacturing, process and industrial switching. The systems are designed to be fail-safe so that if communication is lost the locomotive is brought to a stop automatically.

== History ==
=== United Kingdom ===
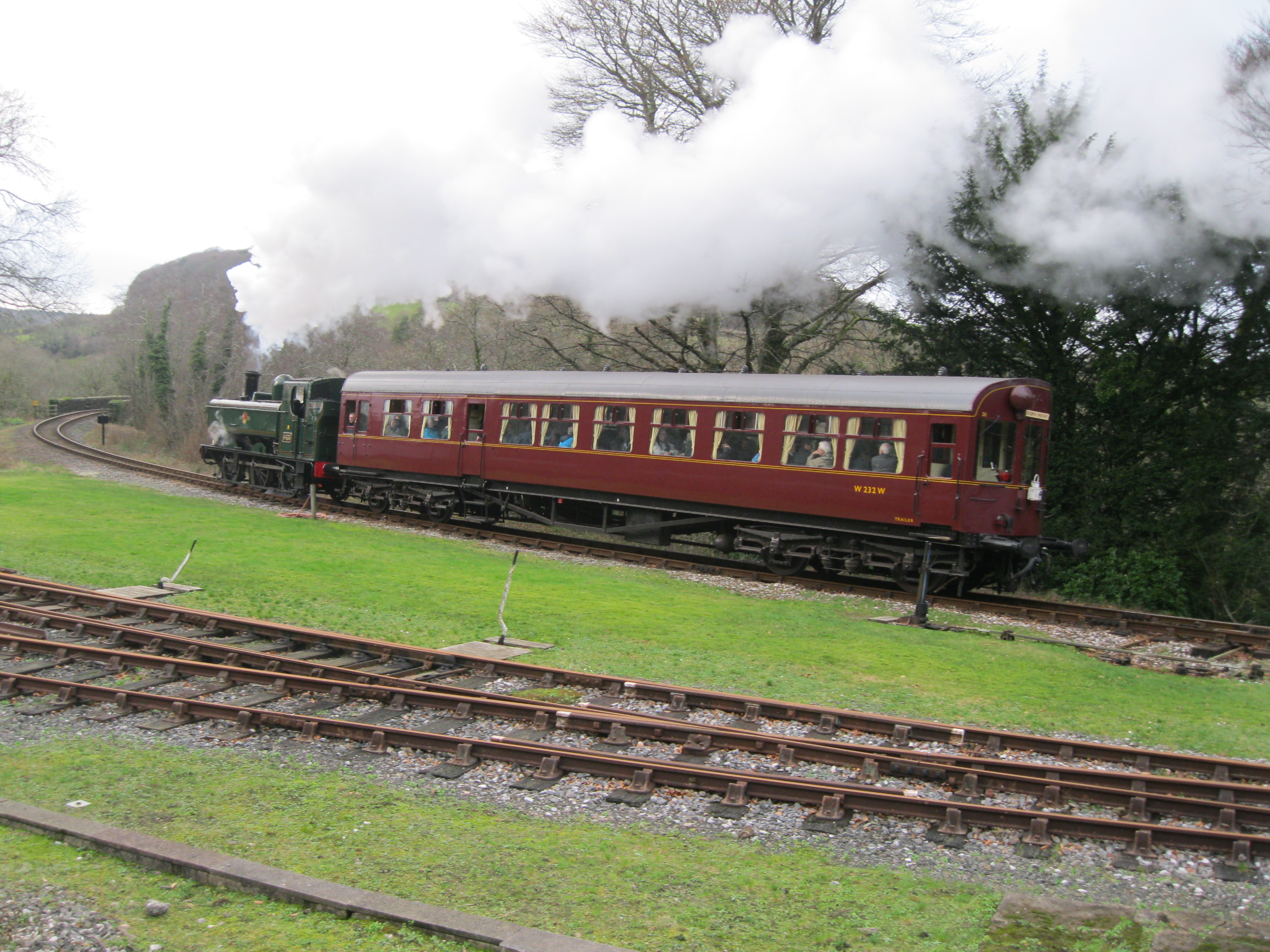
GWR pannier tank with autocoach on Bodmin and Wenford Railway

One of the earliest remote control locomotives was the GWR autocoach, which replaced steam rail motors on both operational cost and maintenance grounds. When running 'autocoach first', the regulator is operated by a linkage to a rotating shaft running the length of the locomotive, passing below the cab floor. This engages (via a telescopic coupling) with another shaft running the full length below the floor of the autocoach. This shaft is turned by a second regulator lever in the cab of the autocoach. The driver can operate the regulator, brakes and whistle from the far (cab) end of the autocoach; the fireman remains on the locomotive and (in addition to firing) also controls the valve gear settings. The driver can also warn of the train's approach using a large mechanical gong, prominently mounted high on the cab end of the autocoach, which is operated by stamping on a pedal on the floor of the cab. The driver, guard and fireman communicate with each other by an electric bell system.

=== North America ===
In North America remote controlled locomotives have been in use since the 1980s. In 1988, the US Occupational Safety and Health Administration issued a hazard information bulletin regarding their use. By 1999 Canadian National had 115 locomotives equipped with remote control equipment, covering 70% of flat-yard switching and all of its hump yard operations. Canadian National estimated a savings of CA$20 million per year vs. traditional switching operations.

The Brotherhood of Locomotive Engineers and Trainmen expressed concerns about remote control locomotives. The union said that remote control locomotives were not as efficient as traditional engineer-in-cab switching operations while being more dangerous.

In 2001, the US Federal Railroad Administration (FRA) recommended minimal guidelines for the operation of remote control locomotives.

Union Pacific developed remote-control enabled locomotives, referred to as control car remote control locomotives (CCRCL). A CCRCL is a stripped-down locomotive fitted with remote control equipment. A CCRCL has no motive power and must be coupled to a standard locomotive.

== Present ==
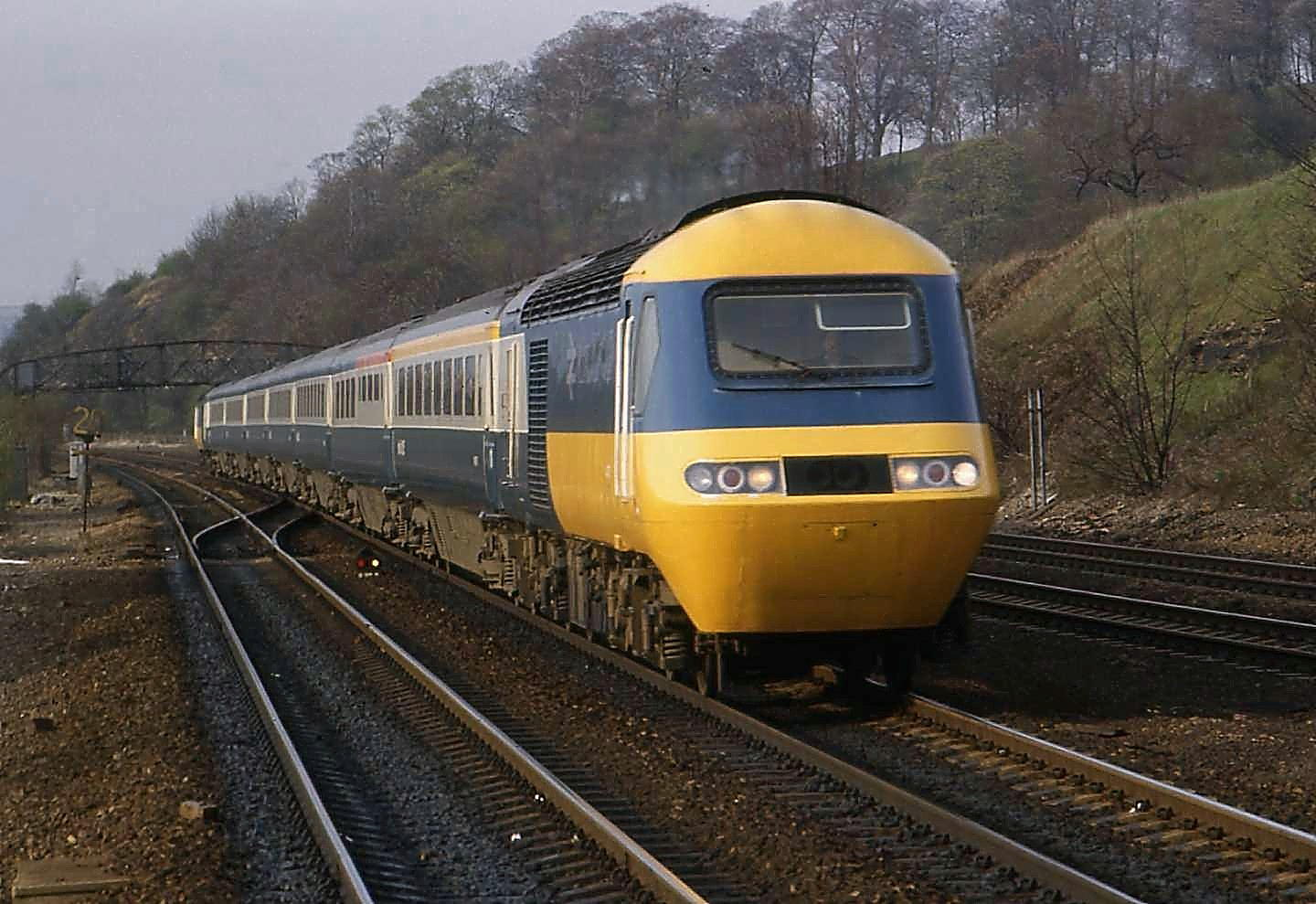
An InterCity 125 in original British Rail livery near Chesterfield, Derbyshire

Modern remote control systems are now based on digital signal technology, with most using time-division multiplexing transmission to cut down on the number of cables or radio bandwidth required for integrated control.

The UK's InterCity 125 was the first passenger train to use TDM technology, introduced from 1976 to allow it to control up to eight carriages sandwiched between two Class 43 power cars.

Locotrol is a product of GE Transportation that enables distributed power sending signals from the lead locomotive to the remote units via radio control. Locotrol is installed on more than 8,500 locomotives around the world. Users of the system include BHP Iron Ore, Westrail and Aurizon in Australia.
