= PKP class ET42 =

Polish class of rail trains

ET42
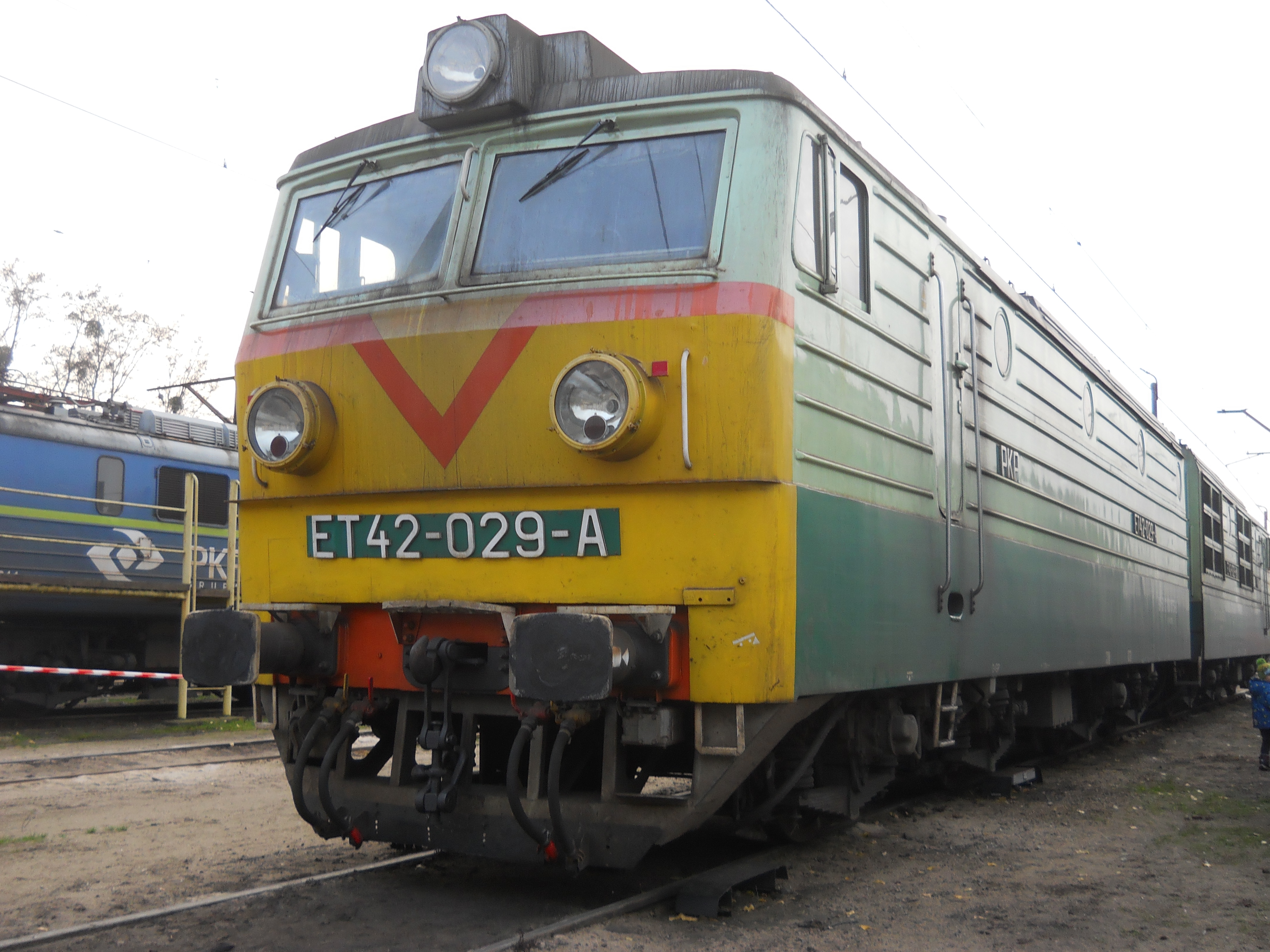
- ET42 in Poznań
Type and origin
- Power type: Electric
- Designer: VElNII
- Builder: Novocherkassk Electric Locomotive Plant
- Build date: 1978–1982
- Total produced: 50
Specifications
- Configuration
  - UIC: Bo′Bo′+Bo′Bo′
- Gauge: 1,435 mm (4 ft 8 1/2 in)
- Wheel diameter: 1,250 mm (49.2 in)
- Length: 30,880 mm (101 ft 4 in)
- Loco weight: 164 tonnes (161 long tons; 181 short tons)
- Electric system/s: 3,000 V DC
- Current pickup: Pantograph
- Traction motors: NB-508A, 8 off
- Loco brake: Oerlikon + Electrodynamic
- Train brakes: Oerlikon
- Safety systems: Samoczynne Hamowanie Pociągu (SHP)
Performance figures
- Maximum speed: 100 km/h (62 mph) with 86:25 gear ratio
- Power output: 4,480 kW (6,010 hp)
Career
- Operators: PKP
- Nicknames: Rusek, Czapajew (Chapayev)

The Soviet-made ET42 (also manufactured as NEWZ 112E) was PKP's (Polish National Railways) most powerful standard gauge electric freight locomotive. Due to its provenance, it is often referred to by its nickname of Rusek (Polish derogatory word for a native of Russia) or Czapajew (Chapayev) (Russian: Чапаев).

== Description ==
The locomotive's construction is based on that of the Soviet VL10 and VL11 (Russian: ВЛ10 & ВЛ11, respectively) and is characterised by its straightforward design as well as ease of use and reliability. The ET42 was designed to be a dual section locomotive from the outset, as opposed to the remaining dual section locomotives operated by PKP, such as the ET41 or ET40. For this reason a "single version" of the ET42 doesn't exist; nor is it possible to modify one of the sections to run as an independent unit. Since there aren't any empty spaces left by surplus cabs, the locomotive is much shorter than other dual section locomotives built from single units. The ET42 is also equipped with facilities for heating carriages and can therefore be used for hauling passenger trains. Moreover, it has five positions of excitation attenuation (from 83% to 36% of full field) which allows for higher speed on the track after the train accelerates.

== History ==
In 1969, the electrification of Polish Coal Trunk-Line between Upper Silesia and Gdańsk was completed, which made it possible to run freight trains with electric locomotives from Silesia to ports along the Baltic. Yet at the time, Polish State Railways did not have sufficiently strong locomotives in its stock that could handle the increasingly heavy trains on the route. The initial decision to serve this route by ET21 with multiple tractions resulted in shortages of locomotives. In the early 1970s, stronger two-unit locomotives were ordered independently from two suppliers: one in Czechoslovakia (ET40) and the other in the Soviet Nowocherkas Electric Locomotive Construction Plant (ET42). Originally, the Soviet locomotives were to receive the designation ET41, but their delivery was delayed and the designation was given to the new ET41 locomotive, constructed in Poland on the basis of the EU07 locomotive .

Fifty ET42s were purchased between 1978 and 1982 and were all based at the Zduńska Wola Karsznice depot. They were all built at the Novocherkassk Electric Locomotive Factory in the former Soviet town of Novocherkassk (Russian: Новочеркасск). The ET42's main role is hauling very heavy coal trains (up to 4,000 tonnes) along the routes leading from Silesia to the ports of Gdańsk and Gdynia. Four locomotives are no longer in PKP's inventory: ET42-003, ET42-033, ET42-043 and ET42-045 due to a rail accident. Now all locomotives are based in Zakład Taboru Tarnowskie Góry.

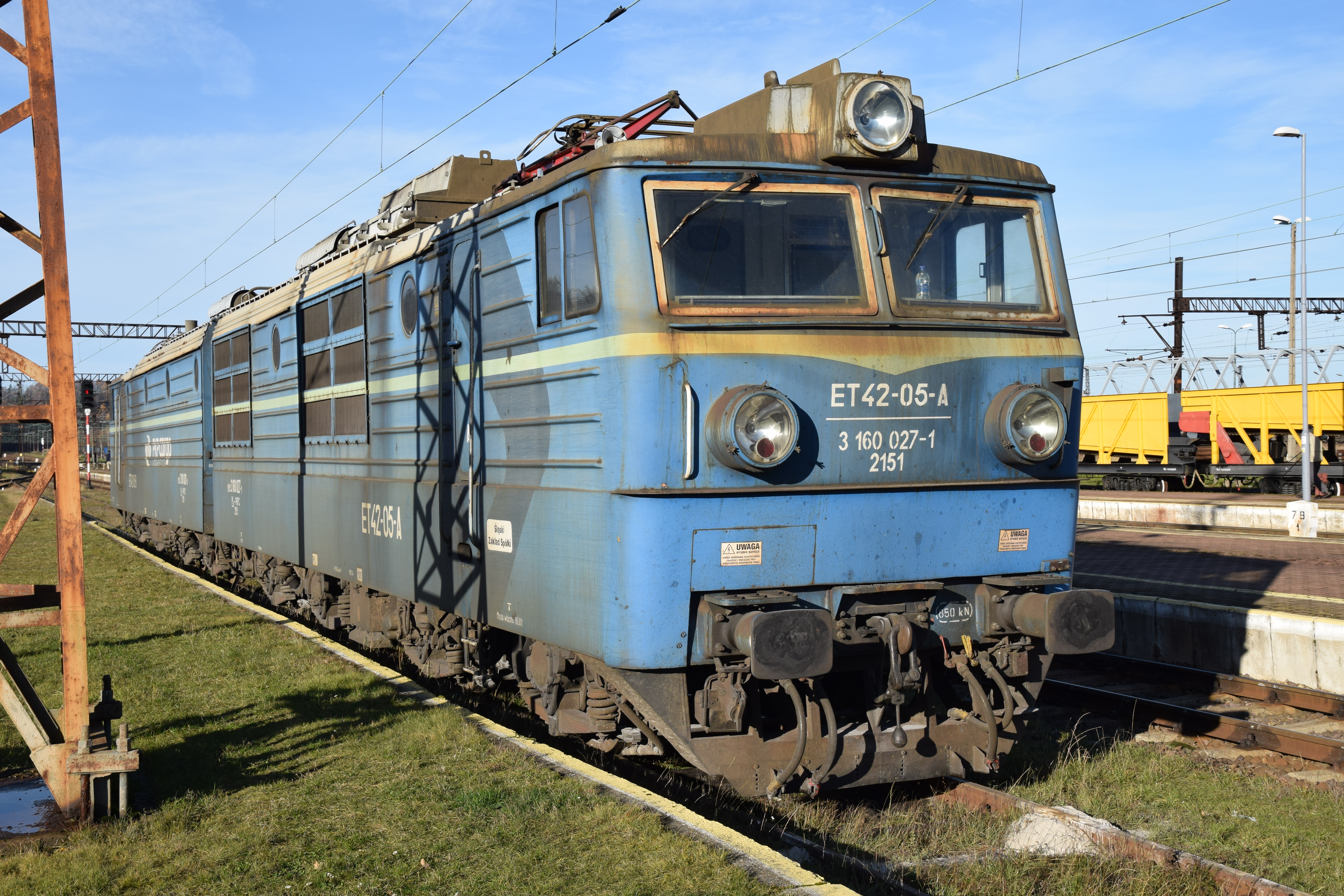
ET42 in 2017

On September 29th, 2025 The last active locomotive of the series, ET42-035 suffered an axle rim offset which caused the locomotive to be withdrawn from service, thus ending the operation of these locomotives in Polish State Railways.

== See also ==
- Polish locomotives designation
