= ChS3 =

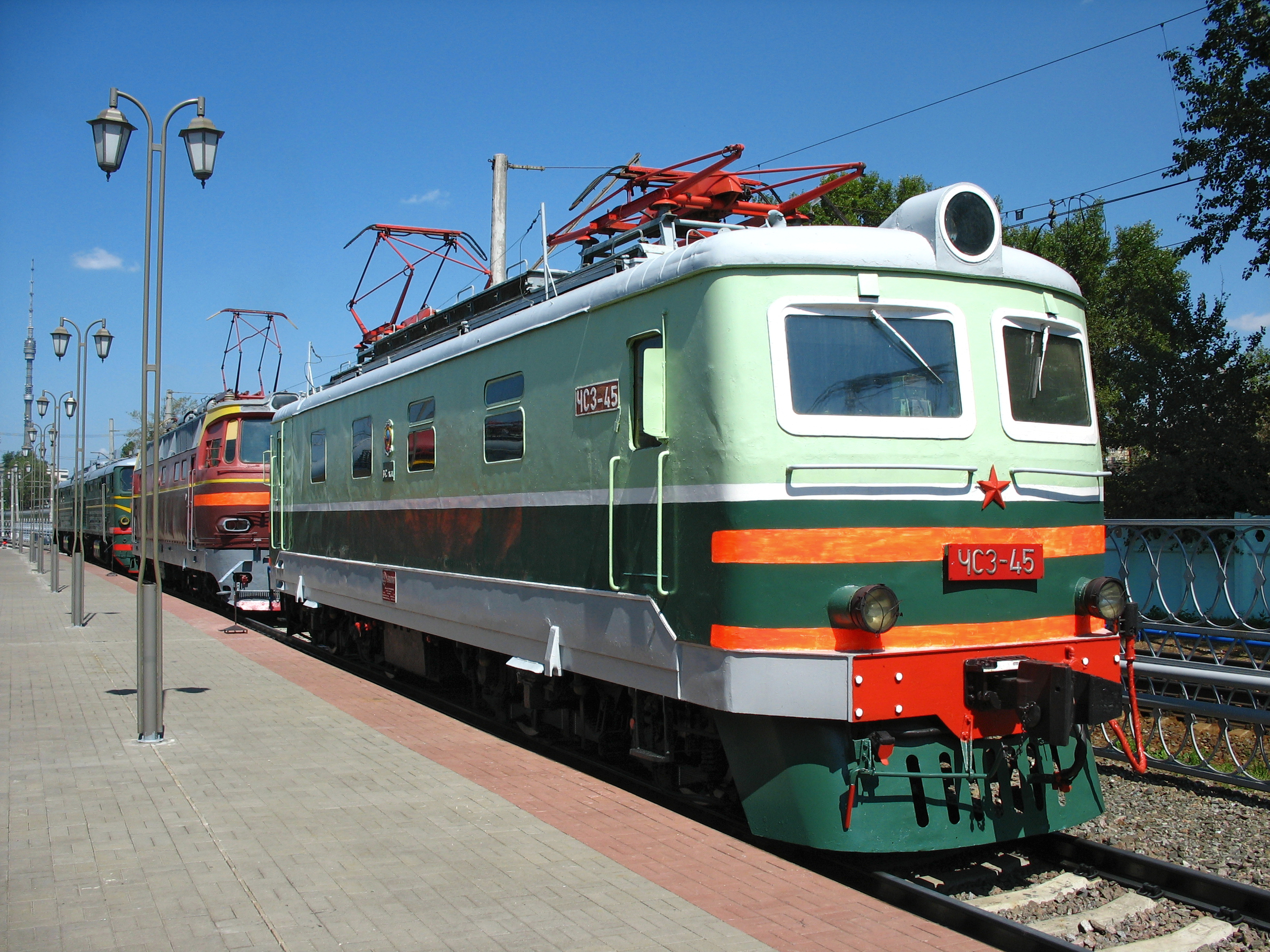
- ChS3-45 at the Moscow Railway Museum, Rizhsky Rail Terminal, Moscow
Type and origin
- Power type: Electric
- Builder: Škoda Works
- Build date: 1961
- Total produced: 87
Specifications
- Configuration
  - UIC: Bo′Bo′
- Gauge: 1,524 mm (5 ft); 1,520 mm (4 ft 11 27/32 in) Russian gauge
- Bogies: 2
- Length: 17.1 m (56 ft 1 in)
- Loco weight: 85 t (84 long tons; 94 short tons)
- Electric system/s: 3 kV DC Catenary
- Current pickup: Pantograph
- Traction motors: 4× 700 kW (940 hp)
Performance figures
- Maximum speed: 120 km/h (75 mph)
- Power output: 2,000 hp (1,500 kW)
Career
- Operators: РЖД (RZhD),
- Locale: Russia; Soviet Union
- Delivered: 1961

The ChS3 (Russian: ЧС3) is a type of 4-axle passenger direct current (catenary voltage of 3 kV) electric locomotive, manufactured in 1961, which was used in the Soviet Union and the Russian Federation. In 1960, due to the increase in passenger trains, the Skoda factory was ordered to design and produce a more powerful locomotive type than the ChS1. The plant's management decided to base the new electric locomotives on the ChS1 class of locomotive. Therefore, the more powerful AL4846eT traction motors and traction drive were installed in the experimental ChS1 locomotive (which had the factory designation 29E0). Thus, the ChS3 design was an improved version of the ChS1.

== Production ==
All 87 ChS3 locomotives were built in 1961.

== Service ==
The ChS3 started off serving the Moscow-Kharkov line, before being transferred to the Trans-Siberian Railway, where they operated until 1991. They were often used in pairs. They were gradually replaced with electric ChS2 locomotives.

== Standard gauge version ==
A 1,435 mm (4 ft 8 1/2 in) standard gauge version was produced by Skoda for Czechoslovakia ČSD Class E 499.1 and Poland PKP class EP05.

The Polish PKP class ET40 Bo-Bo+Bo-Bo locomotive was also based on the design of the ChS3.

== Gallery ==
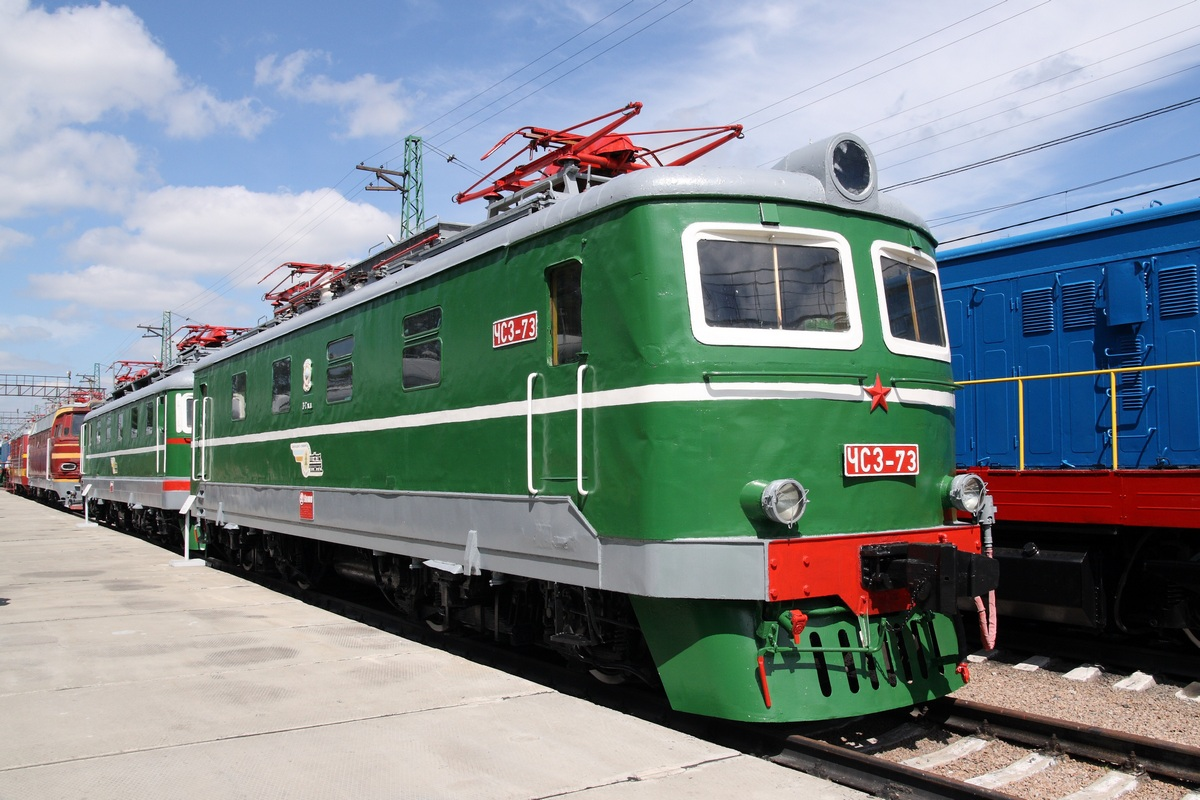
Electric locomotive ChS3-73 in Novosibirsk Railway Museum, Russia

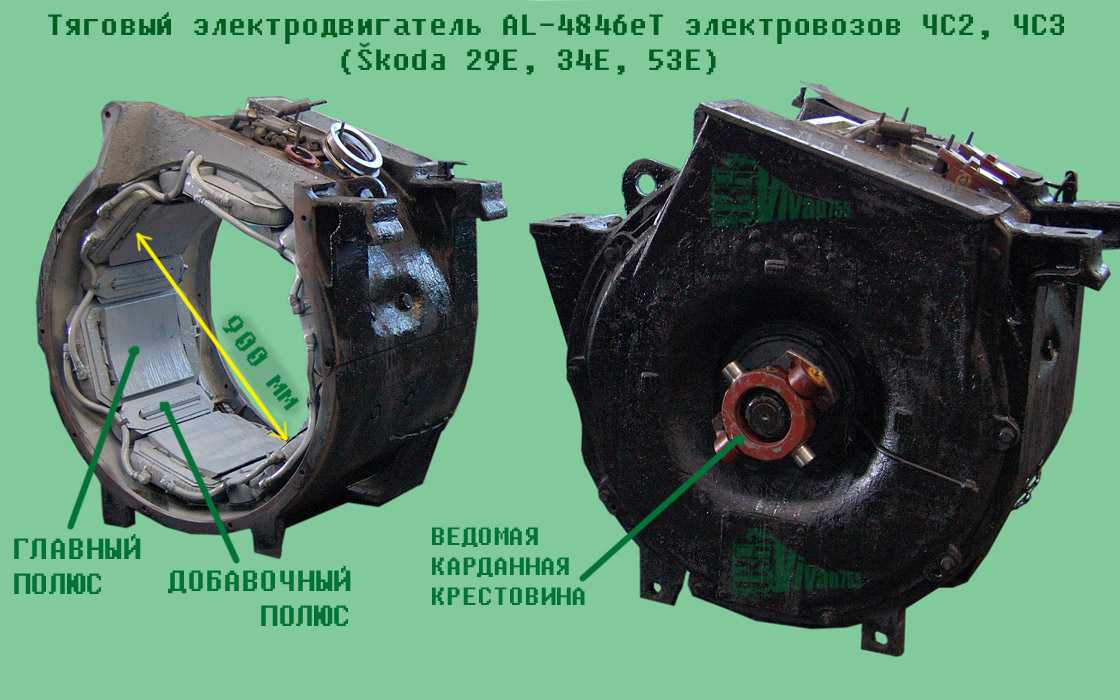
Traction motor Skoda AL-4846eT as used in a ChS3 locomotive

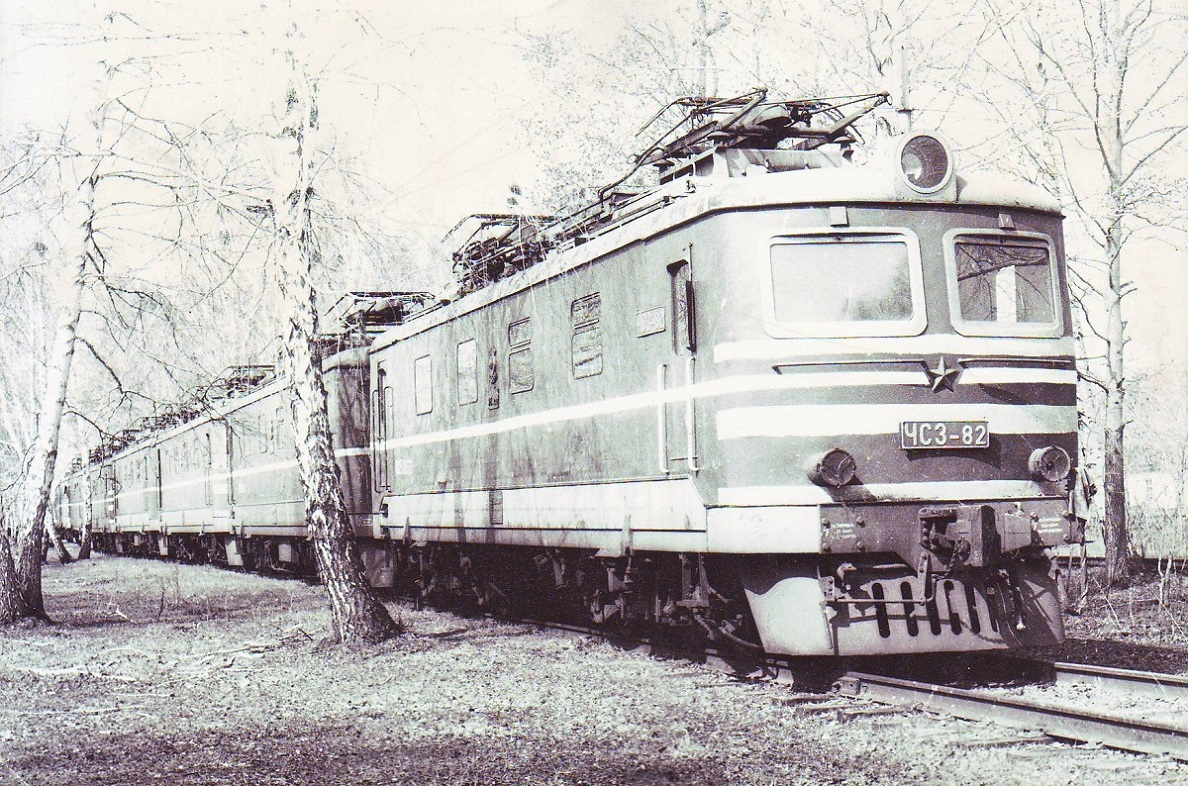
Electric locomotive ChS3-82 in Novosibirsk oblast

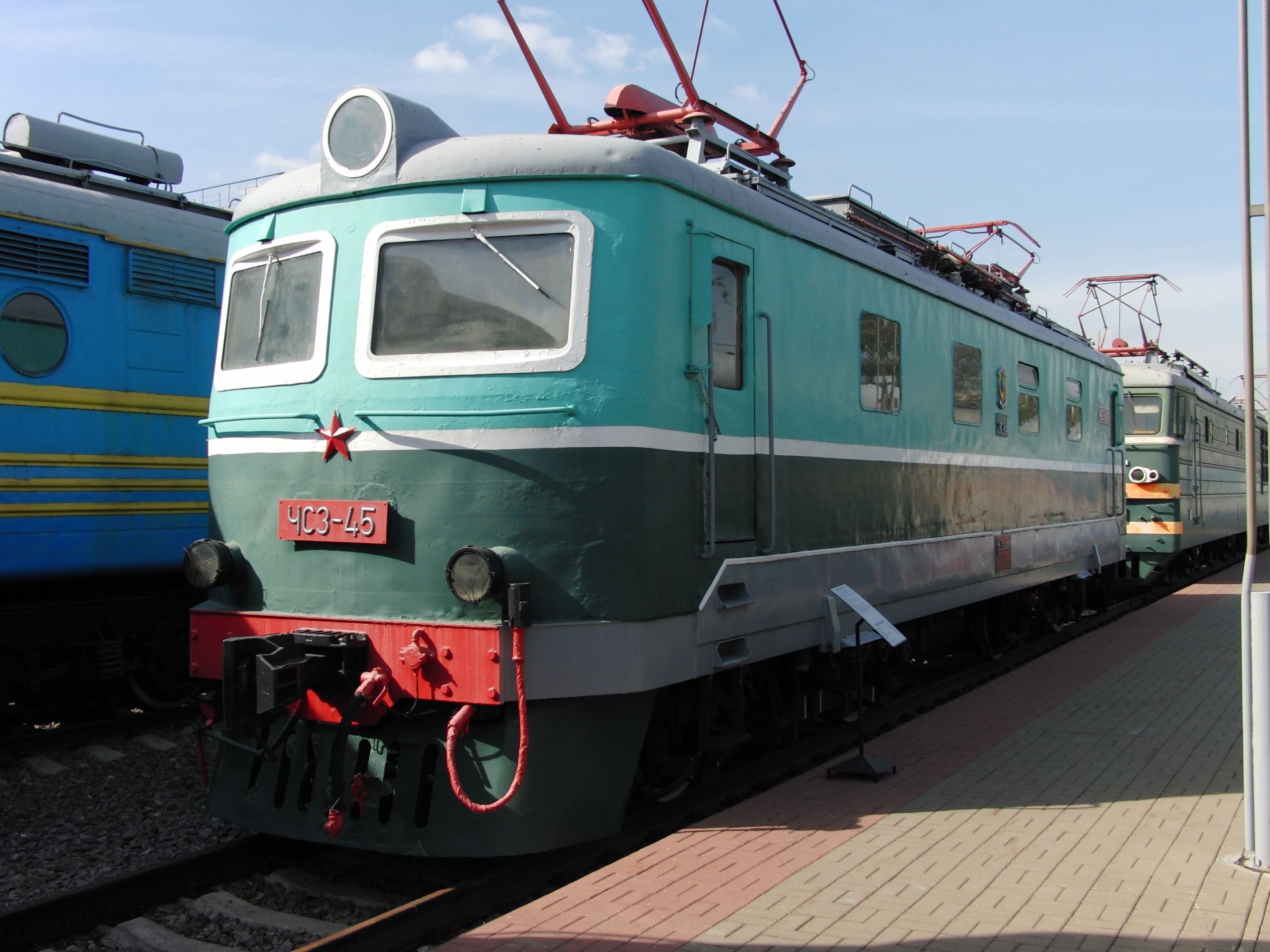
Electric locomotive ChS3-45 in Moscow Railway Museum, Russia

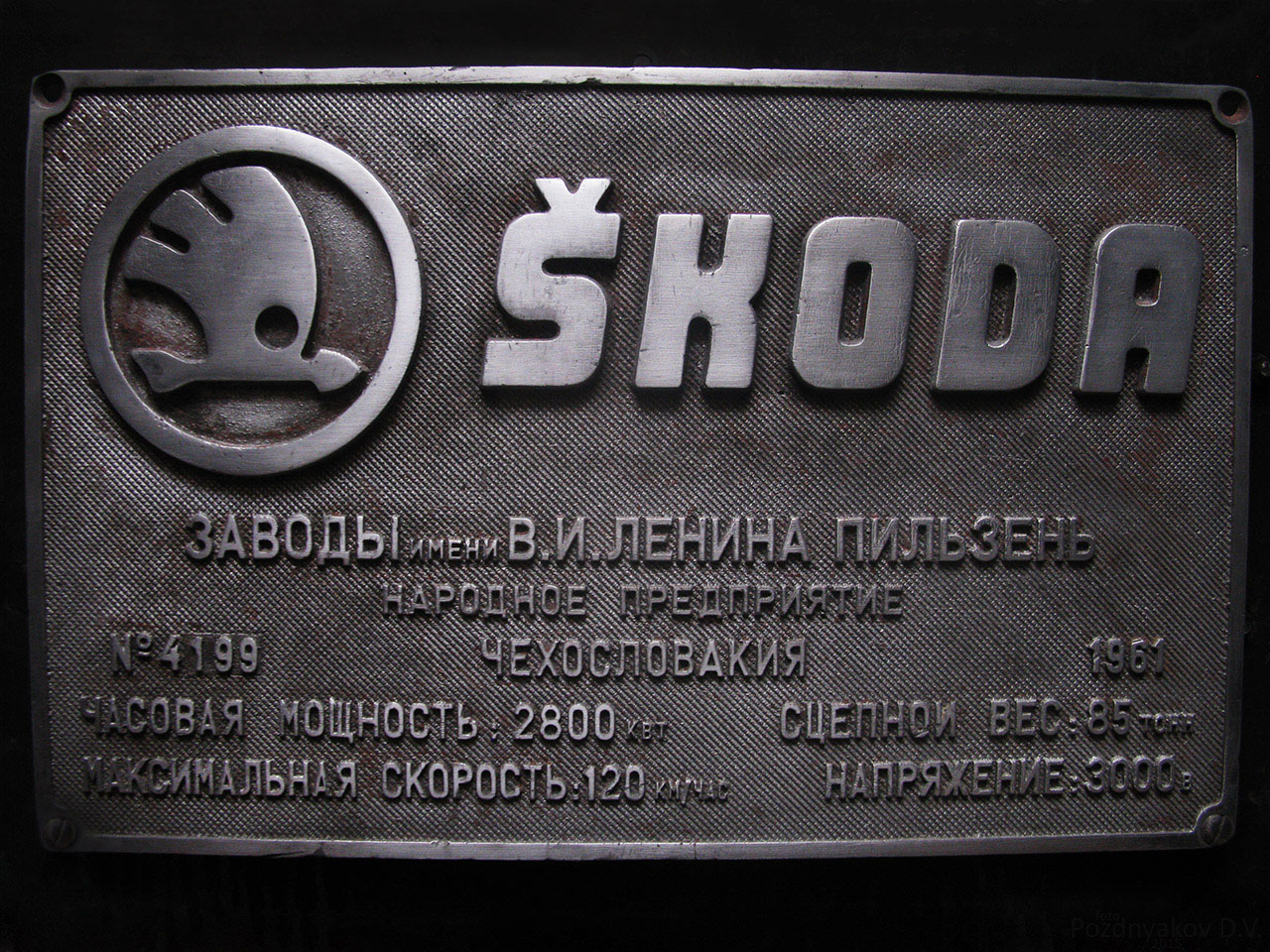
ChS3-55 (builder's plate)

== See also ==
- The Museum of the Moscow Railway, at Paveletsky Rail Terminal, Moscow
- Rizhsky Rail Terminal, Moscow, Home of the Moscow Railway Museum
- Varshavsky Rail Terminal, St.Petersburg, Home of the Central Museum of Railway Transport, Russian Federation
- History of rail transport in Russia
