= Novocherkassk Electric Locomotive Plant =

Heavy industry company in Novocherkassk, Rostov Oblast, Russia

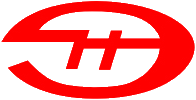
- Industry: Rail vehicle and machine building
- Founded: 1936
- Headquarters: Novocherkassk, Russia
- Products: Electric locomotives
- Revenue: $748 million (2014)
- Parent: Transmashholding
- Website: www.nevz.com

Novocherkassk Electric Locomotive Plant (NEVZ, Russian: Новочеркасский электровозостроительный завод), established in 1936, is based in the Russian town of Novocherkassk, Rostov Region. It is now (2015) part of Transmashholding. NEVZ locomotives haul trains transporting 80% of all cargo on the electrified railways of Russia and CIS countries. On its production lines, the plant has produced around 15,000 locomotives of more than 40 types.

In June 1962, NEVZ workers went on strike and protested against the rise of food prices in the Soviet Union; the events became known as the Novocherkassk massacre, which took place when the striking workers were shot by Soviet troops. The N. S. Khrushchev government later covered up the story which became public only in the early 1990s.

== List of products ==
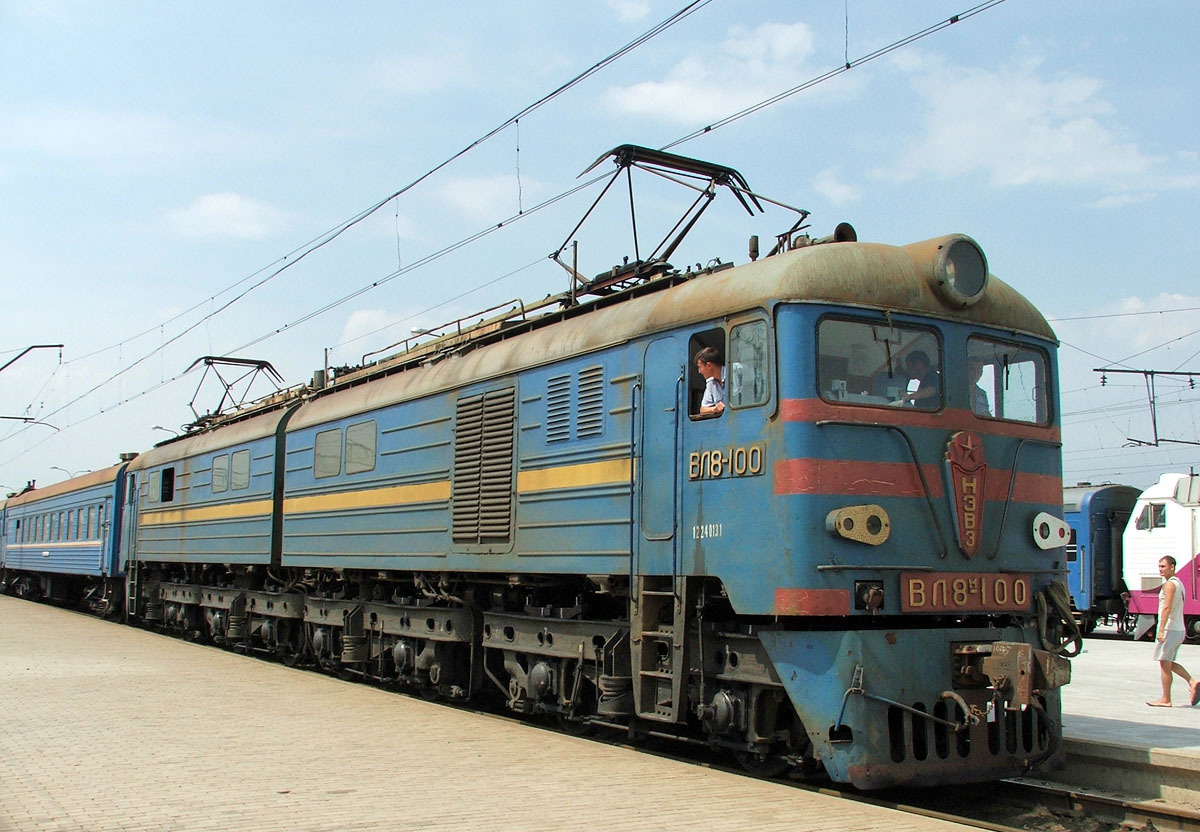
Electric locomotive VL8M-100

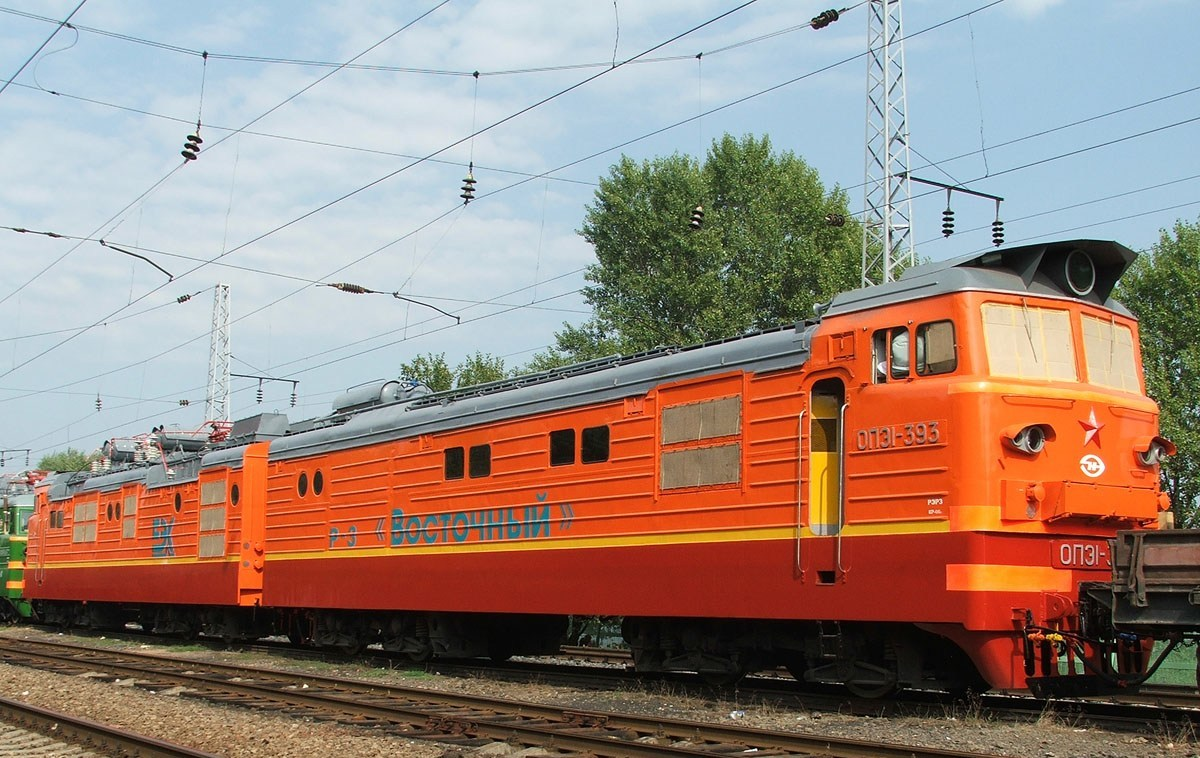
Electric locomotive OPE1-393

=== Electric locomotives ===
- E5K (Э5К), 2ES5K (2ЭС5К), 3ES5K "Yermak" ("Ермак"), 4-, 8- and 12-axle freight AC locos. Built since 2004.
- 2ES4K (2ЭС4К, "Donchak"), DC version of Yermak loco. Built since 2008.
- EP1 and EP1M (ЭП1), AC passenger locos. EP1 built in 1999–2007, EP1M since 2007.
- EP10 (ЭП10), passenger locos. Built in 1998–2006 with Bombardier Transportation.
- VL10 (ВЛ10), passenger-freight locos. Built in 1961–77.
- VL22 (ВЛ22) (1946–58)
- VL23 (ВЛ23)
- VL60 (ВЛ60) (1957–67), passenger-freight locos
- VL65 (ВЛ65) (1992–98), passenger locos
- VL80 (ВЛ80) (1961–95)
- VL82 (ВЛ82) (1966–79)
- VL85 (ВЛ85) (1983–94)
- VL86F (ВЛ86Ф)
- CNR class 8G (1987–90), electric AC freight locomotive. Produced by order of the PRC.
- PKP class ET42 (1978–82), electric DC freight locos. Produced to order of Poland.
- ES40 (VR Class Sr1) (1973–84), single-unit, four-axle electric alternating current locomotives produced for Finnish Railways (VR) with Finnish electrical equipment.
- OPE1 (ОПЭ1) (1969–2001, (single-phase industrial electric locomotive, with one dump cars with engine) – the first Soviet-traction unit. Designed to work on the railroads of open pit mining, electrified phase alternating current with a frequency of 50 Hz at a voltage of 10 kV catenary. You also have the opportunity to work on non-electrified areas.
- EP20 (2012–current), passenger electric locos two-system created by TMH with the French company Alstom. EP20 is conceived as a large-scale project of the head of the family development program of a new generation of Russian locomotives. It was unveiled at the Expo 1520 event in autumn 2011.

Between 1947 and 1975 the NEVZ manufactured 3,441 DC locomotives, 3,774 AC locomotives and 91 double-system ones.

Since 1994 the plant has been carrying out major repairs of electric AC and delivers it to electrical equipment. In addition, NEVZ manufactures mining equipment for open-pit mining, metallurgical enterprises - industrial locomotives DC new generation of induction motor drive, for coal mines - contact mine locomotives, mine cargo trucks.

In 2012, 247 locomotives were built.

== Gallery ==
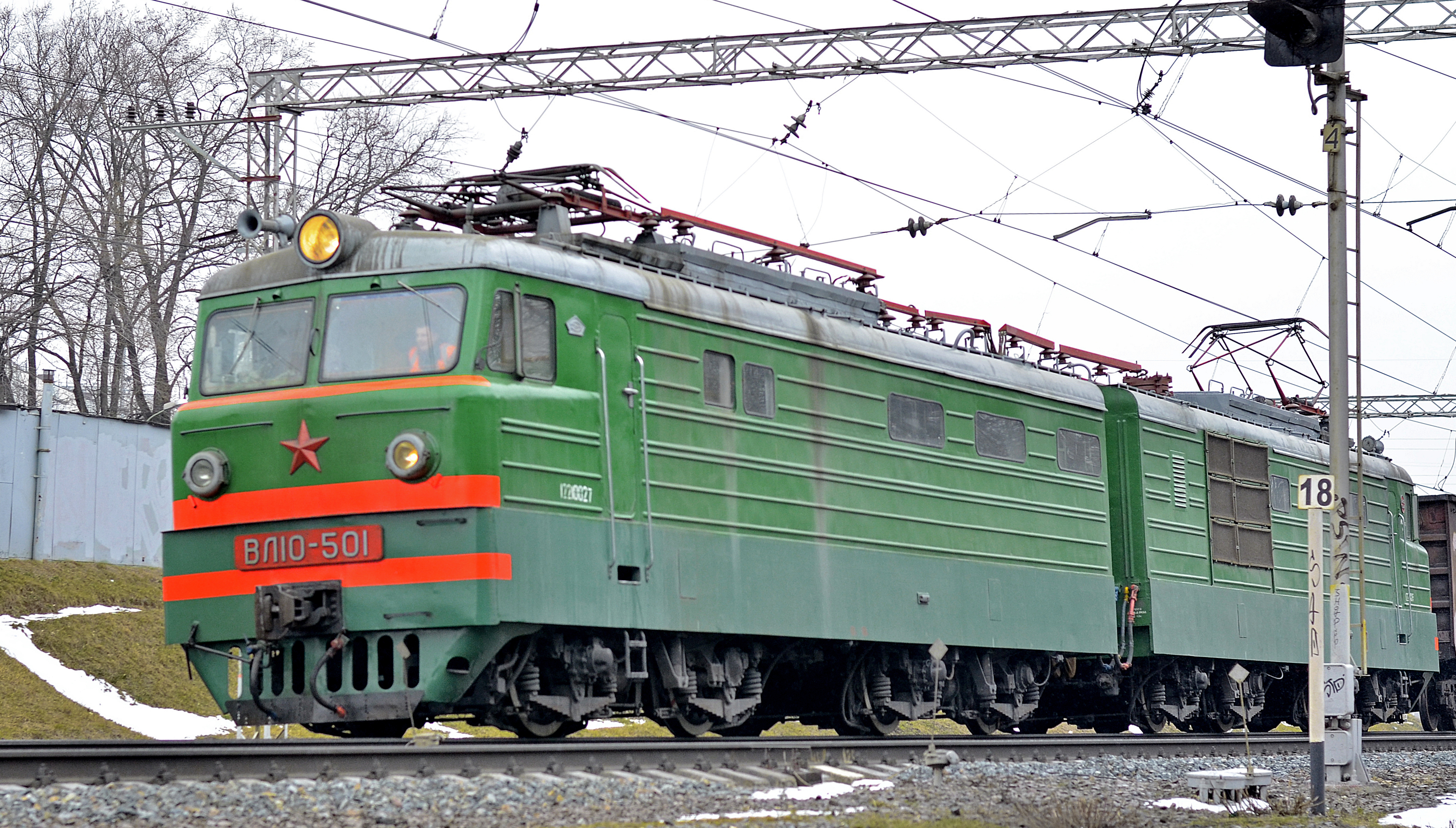
VL10-501 (ВЛ10)

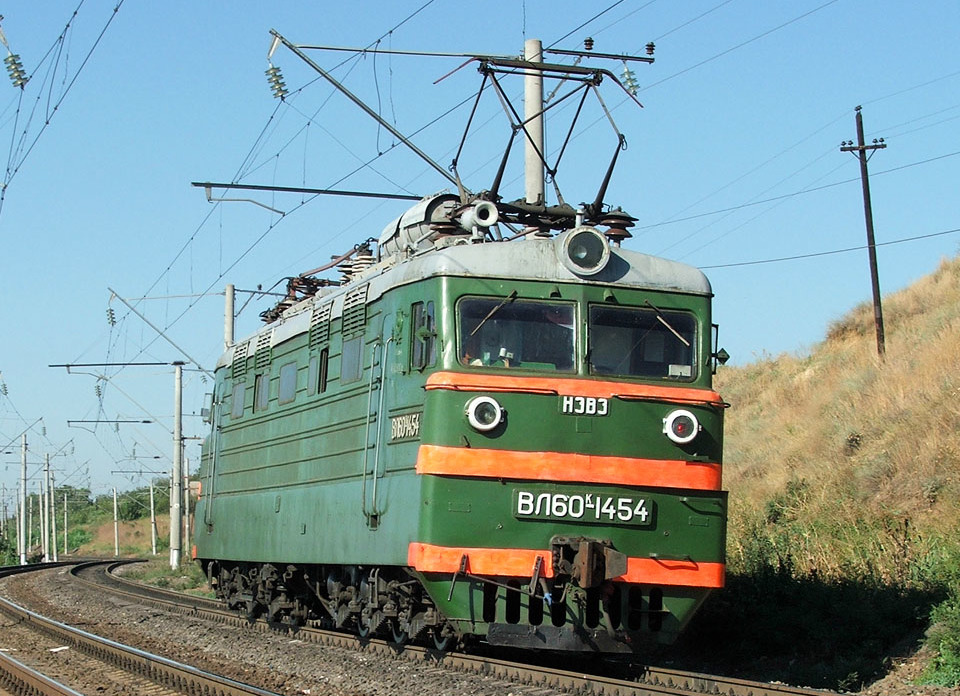
VL60

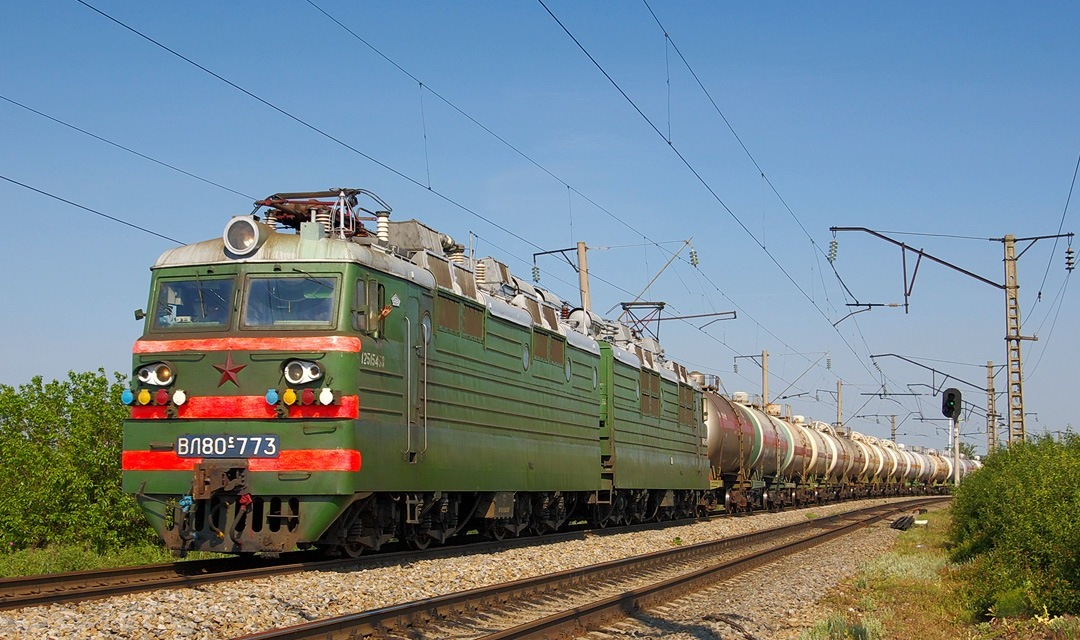
VL80

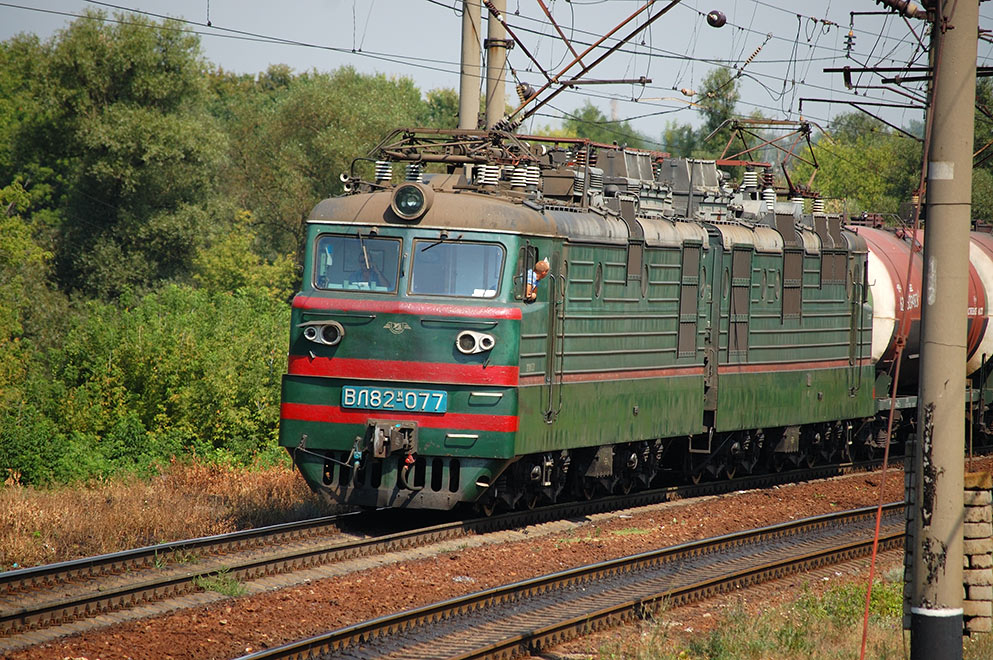
VL82

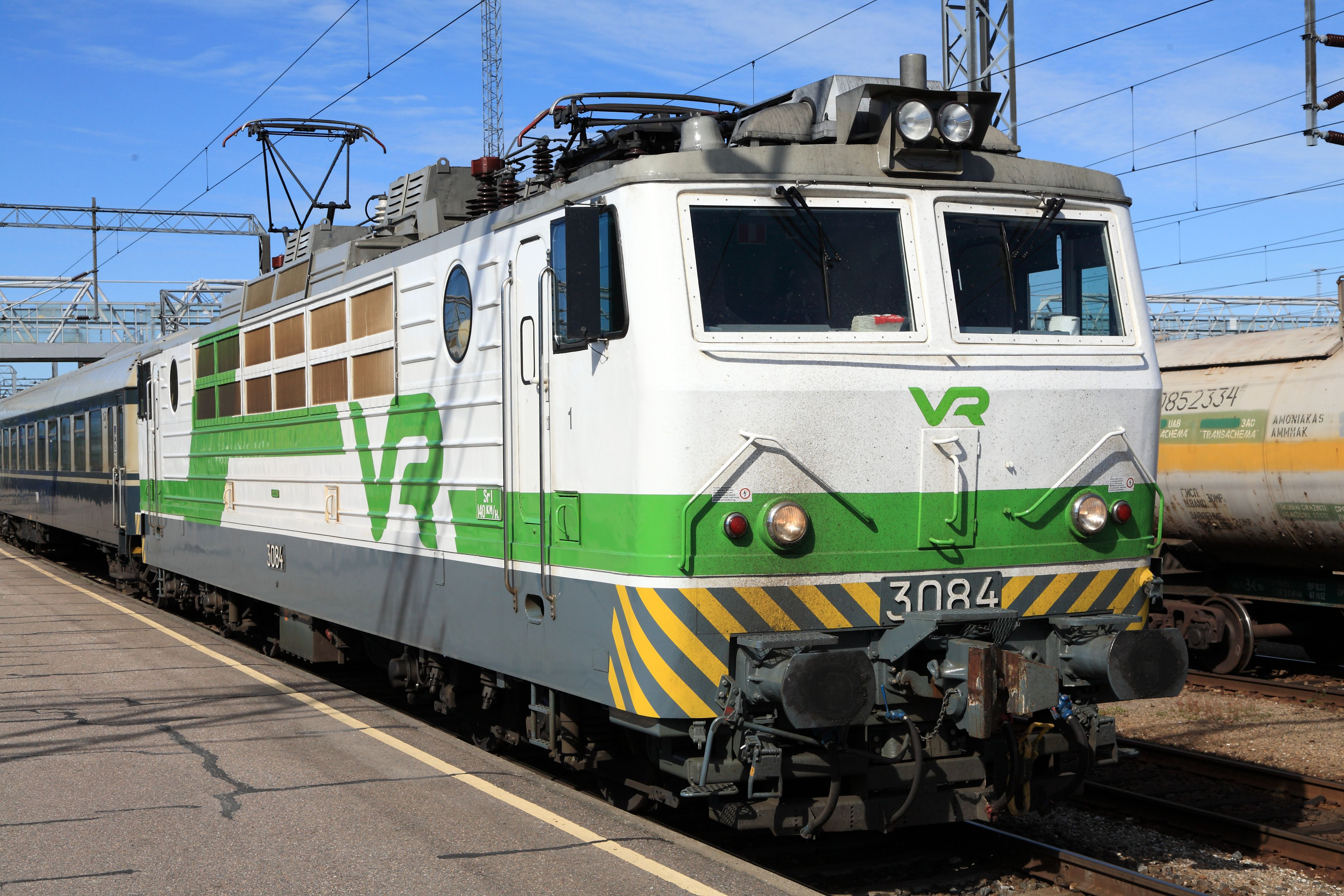
VR Class Sr1-3084

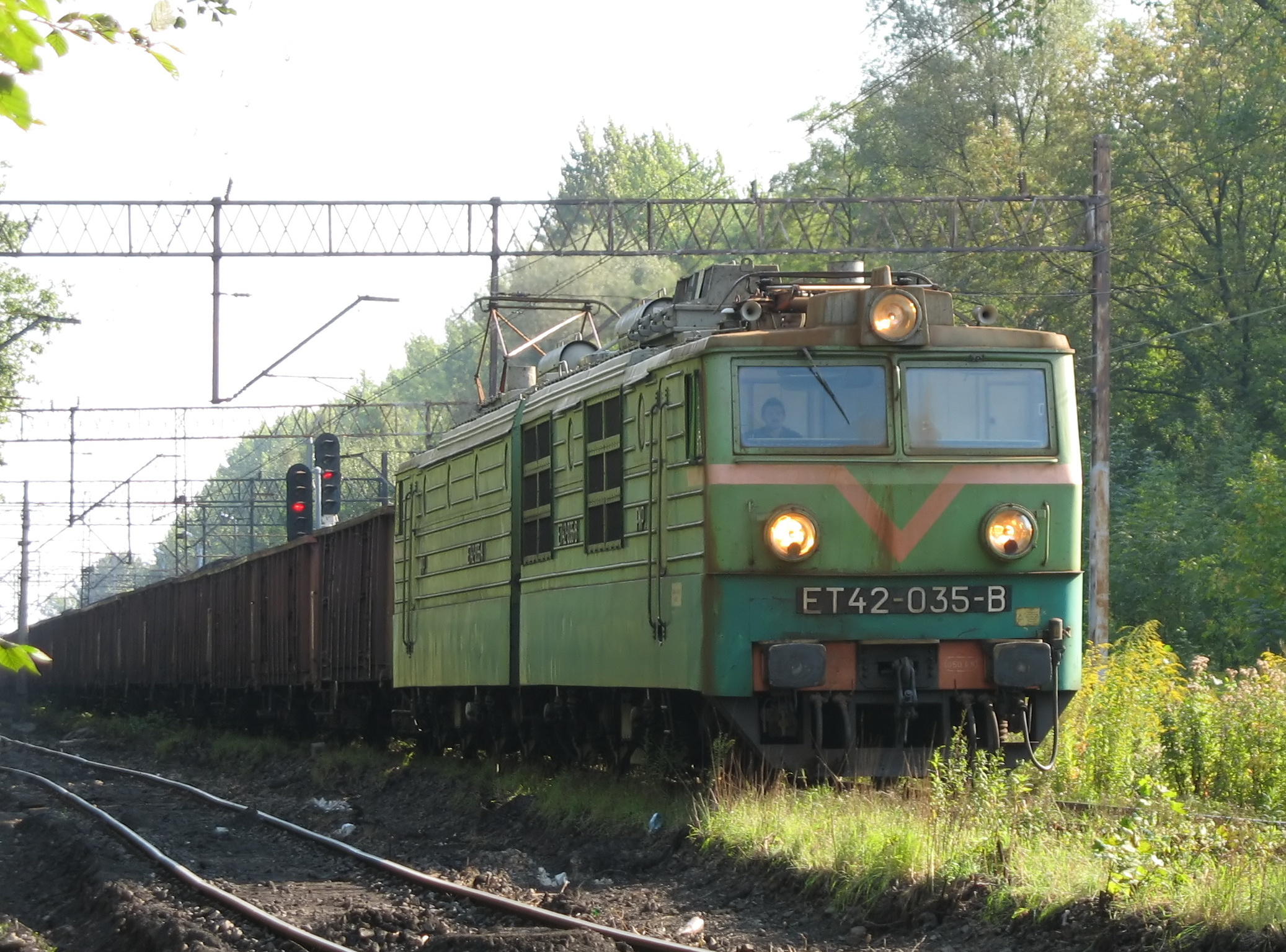
ET42-035

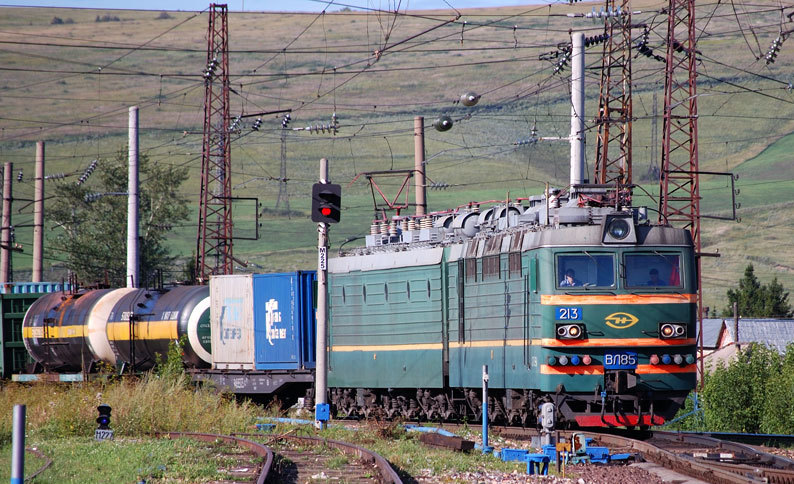
VL85-213

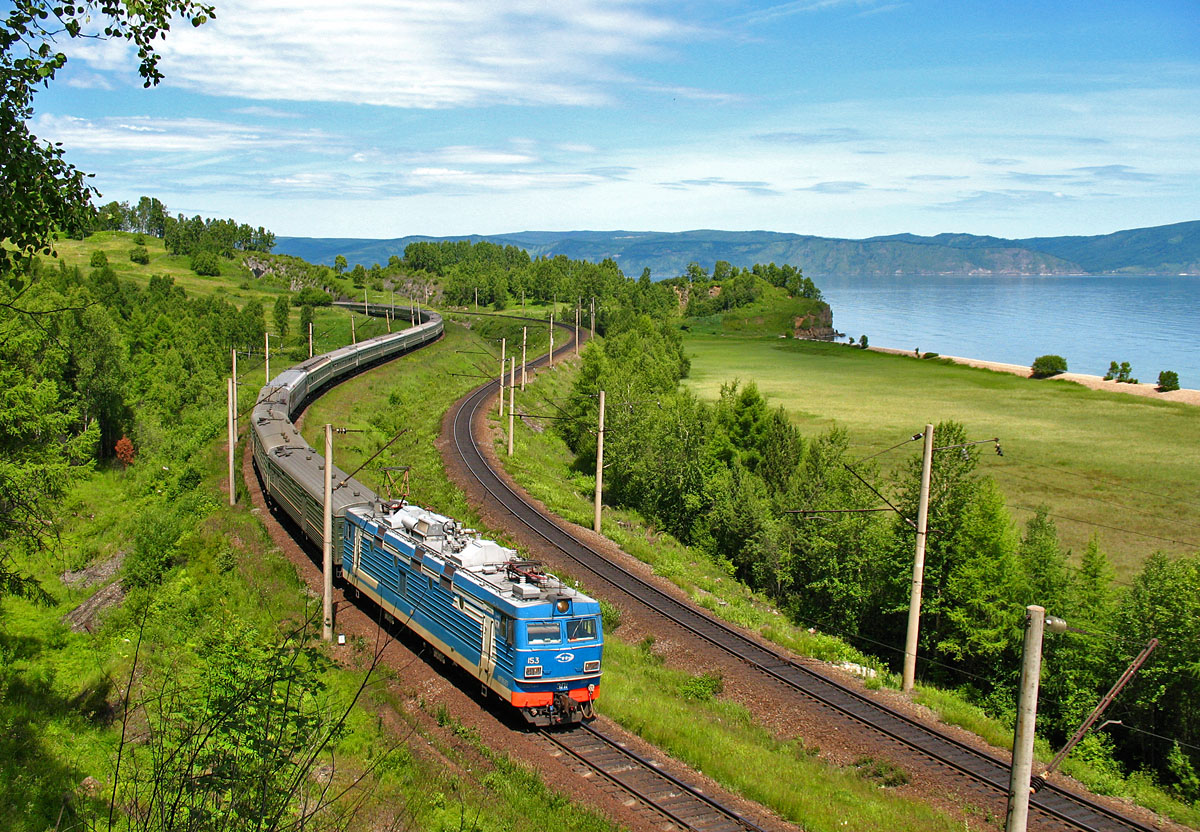
EP1-153.jpg

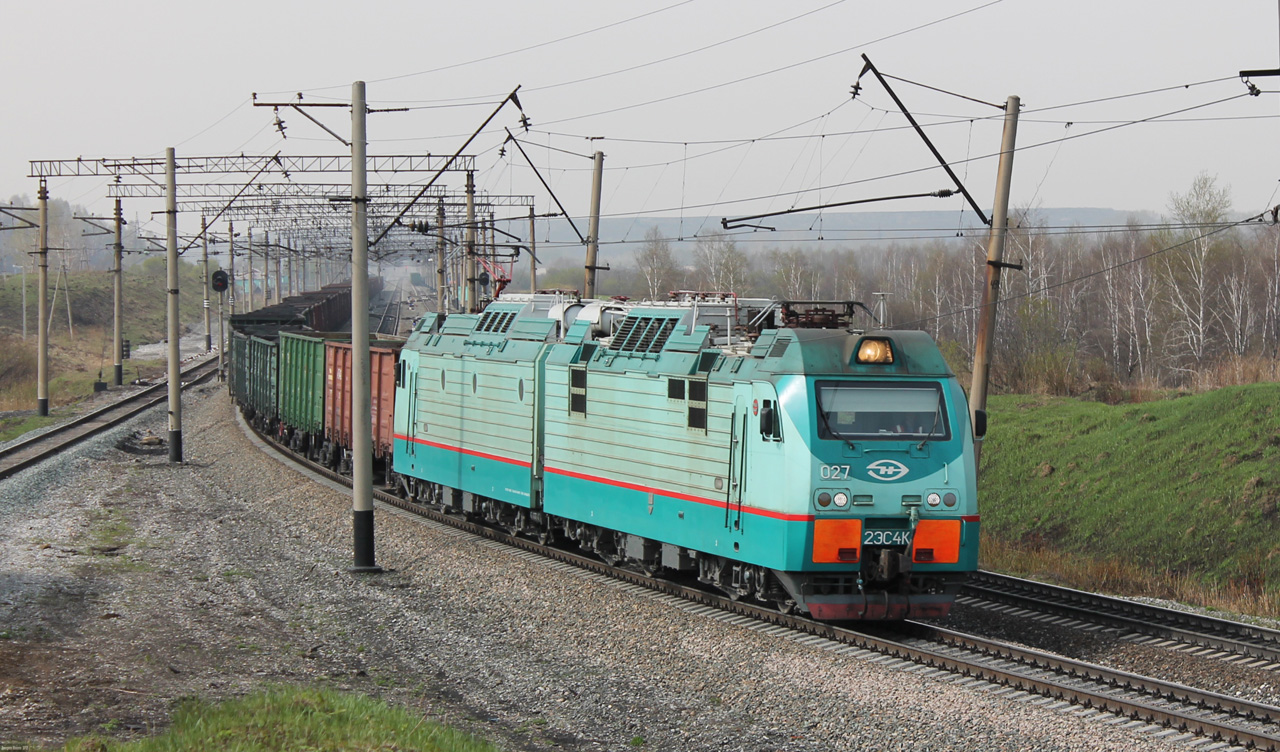
2ES4K Donchak

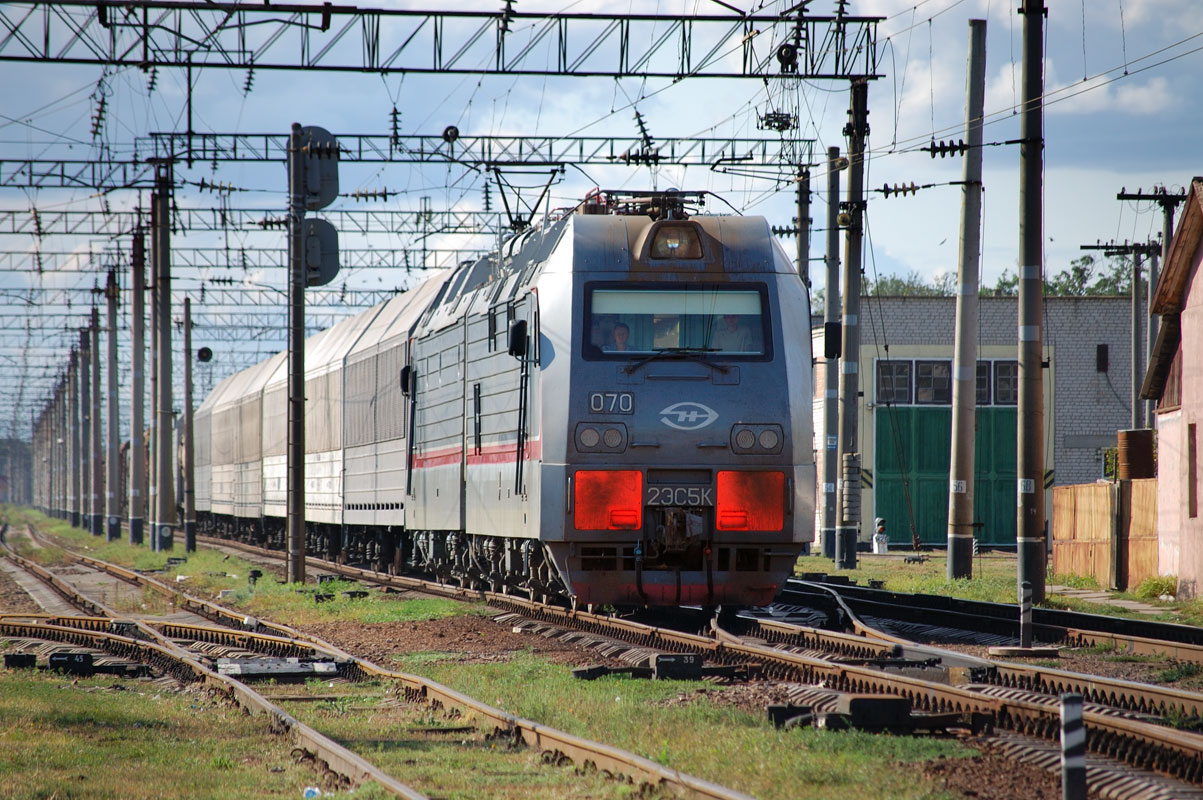
2ES5K-070

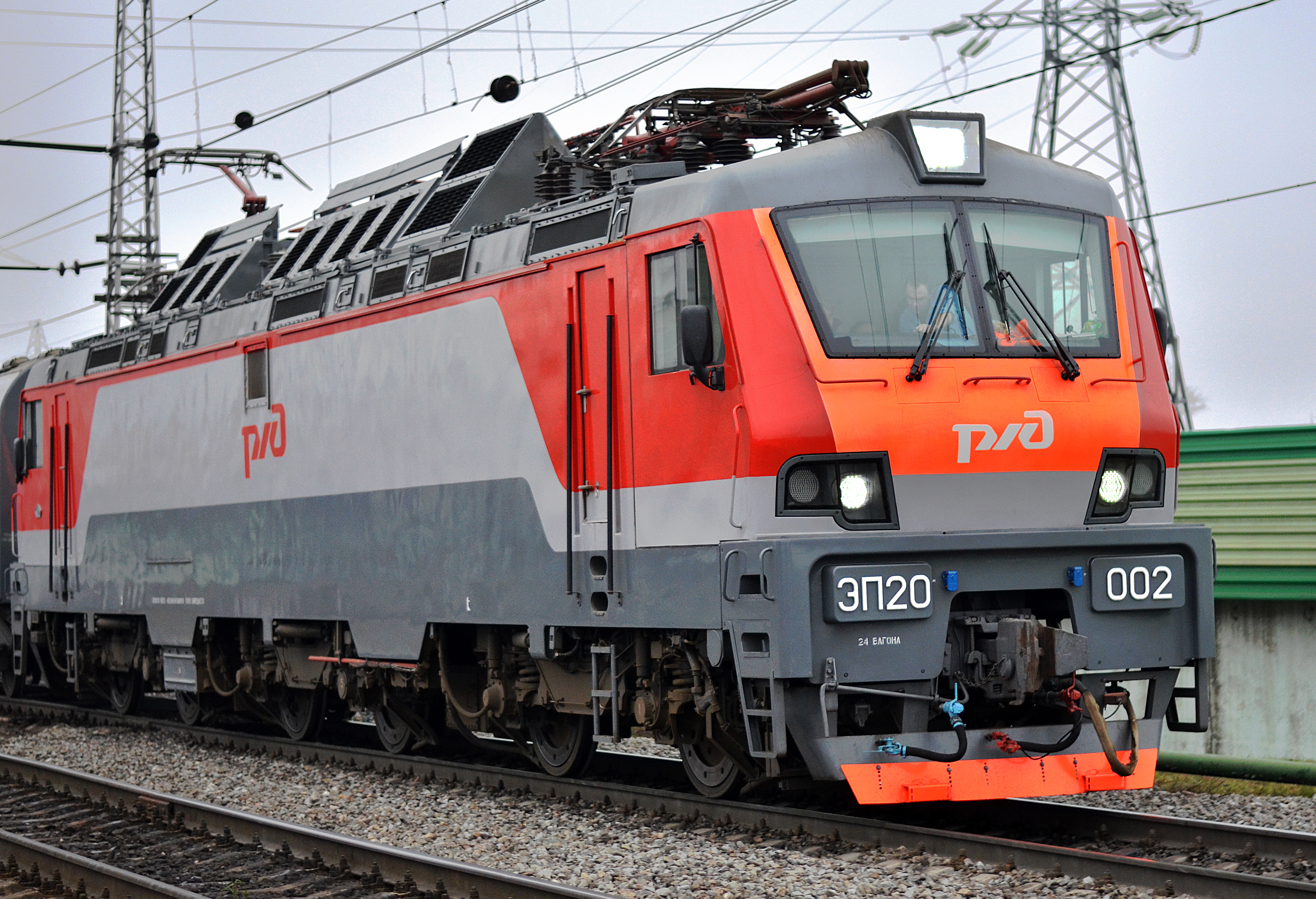
EP20-002

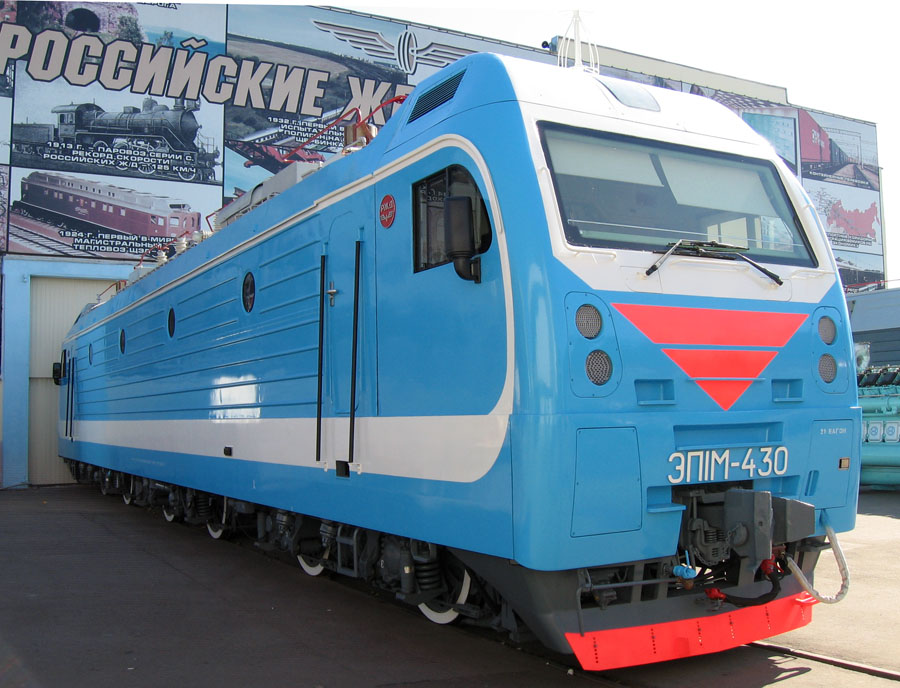
EP1M
