= EP10 =

ЭП10 EP10
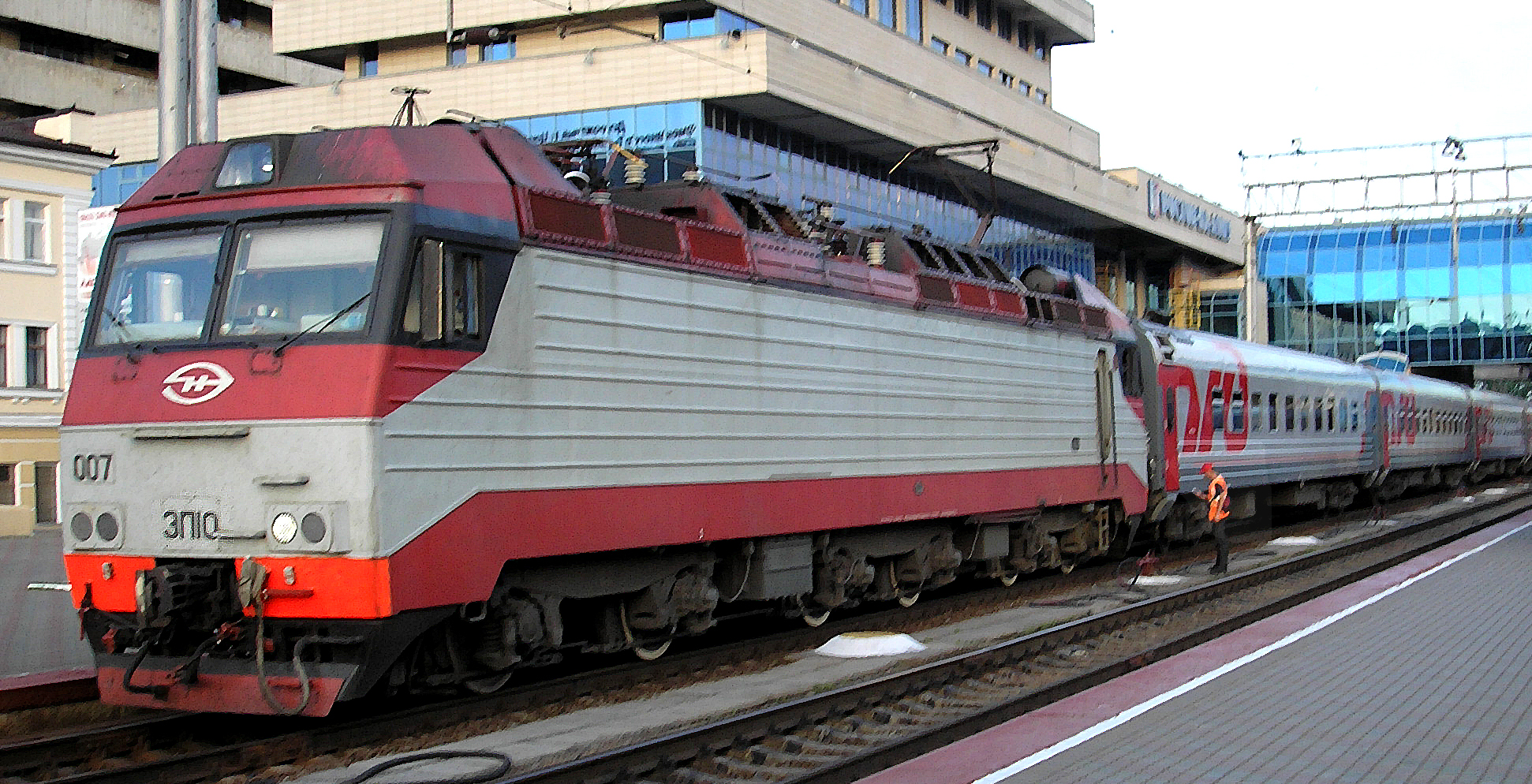
- EP10-007 at the front of a passenger train in 2010
Type and origin
- Power type: Electric
- Builder: NEVZ, Adtranz/Bombardier Transportation
- Build date: 1998*, 2005–2006
- Total produced: 12
Specifications
- Configuration
  - UIC: Bo-Bo-Bo
- Gauge: 1,520 mm (4 ft 11 27/32 in) Russian gauge
- Wheelbase: 6.765 m (22 ft 2 3/8 in) (bogie centre distance); 2.850 m (9 ft 4 1/4 in) (bogie axle distance, ends)
- Length: 22.532 m (73 ft 11 1/8 in) (over couplers)
- Width: 3.100 m (10 ft 2 in)
- Loco weight: 135 t (133 long tons; 149 short tons)
- Electric system/s: 3 kV DC/25 kV 50 Hz AC Catenary
- Current pickup: Pantograph
- Traction motors: SТА-1200
- Head end power: >1,200 kW (1,600 hp)
Performance figures
- Maximum speed: 160 km/h (99 mph)
- Power output: 7,000 kW (9,400 hp) (continuous); 7,200 kW (9,700 hp) (hourly)
- Tractive effort: 375 kN (84,000 lb_{f}) (starting); 300 kN (67,000 lb_{f}) @ 80 km/h (22 m/s)
Career
- Operators: RŽD
- Sources: except where noted; * refers to prototype

The EP10 (Russian: ЭП10) is a type of dual voltage six axle electric locomotive built for Russian Railways (RŽD) by NEVZ in association with Adtranz/Bombardier for passenger use. The design was considered costly, and only 12 units were acquired.

== History ==
Prior to the collapse of the Eastern Bloc and the breakup of the Soviet Union, passenger locomotives used in Russia had been sourced from Czechoslovakia. Afterwards these sources were considered too expensive and the Russian state sought to develop indigenous production of passenger rolling stock.

Decree number 1400 (23 November 1996) of the Government of the Russian Federation "Development and production of new generation passenger rolling stock at Russian enterprises", (Note: Russian: Разработка и производство пассажирского подвижного состава нового поколения на предприятиях России, romanized: Razrabotka i proizvodstvo passazhirskogo podvizhnogo sostava novogo pokoleniya na predpriyatiyakh Rossii) allocated funding from the state to develop and manufacture passenger rail vehicles, including the development of a type ЭП10, specified as a six axle, dual voltage locomotive, of 6.6MW power with asynchronous traction motors and regenerative and rheostatic braking, and an operating speed of 120 to 160 km/h. The machine was to be designed by OJSC VELNII and OJSC NEVZ, in association with a foreign company, and manufactured by VELNII with an expected schedule of prototype delivery in 1997 and series production in 1999.

The prototype was unveiled at Novocherkassk Electric Locomotive Plant (NEVZ) on 20 November 1998.

Initially it was expected that DC and AC only versions EP2 (Russian: ЭП2) and EP3 (Russian: ЭП3) would be developed based on the asynchronous traction technology introduced in the EP10.

Certification testing was complete in February 2005. An order for 11 locomotives was placed in 2005 with Transmashholding and Bombardier Transportation; locomotives No.2 & 3 began production in 2005. The order was valued at 450 million rubles; RZhD initially refused to place an order for the type, citing the high unit price.

In 2006 RZhD chief engineer Valentin Gapanovich stated that only 12 of the class would be procured, and described it as a not a very promising locomotive (Russian: не слишком перспективный локомотив, romanized: ne slishkom perspektivnyy lokomotiv), though the railway had increased it requirement for dual system locomotives. Instead he announced that Transmashholding would be seeking a foreign company to create a joint venture to manufacture a new design - the EP20 (Russian: ЭП20), with an expected order of 230 units or more.

== Design ==
The body and bogies of the prototype locomotives were designed by VELNII and NEVZ, who based it on the VL65 locomotive. Meanwhile, the electrical components (semiconductor converters, control system, transformer, etc.) was based on designs by Adtranz, including the Swiss 460 series and the DB Class 145 and 146 in Germany. The locomotives operate from both 3 kV DC and 25 kV 50 Hz AC using asynchronous motors for traction. Main design features included frame supported traction motors, supply conversion using a four-quadrant rectifier, with intermediate DC link to a GTO based inverter, and microprocessor based control and diagnostic equipment.

The locomotives use water (60% ethylene glycol) cooled MITRAC TC3100 type inverters,) rated at 2500 kW. Each converter supplies two parallel connected traction motors; The traction motors are three phase induction designs with two sets of 'half' windings for each phase: an individual traction unit includes 8 four-quadrant converters (4QC), and two asynchronous motors. Under DC supply (3 kV, up to 4 kV peak) two three-phase inverter blocks are connected in series; each inverter block supplies one set of 'half' windings on two parallel connected motors. When under 25 kV AC the high voltage supply is stepped down to 2.8 kV, and rectified by four-quadrant converters to an intermediate DC link, which supplies an inverter block powering two parallel connected motors, with the 'half' windings connected in series.

The design has an efficiency of up to 86% on AC supply, 88% on DC supply. Operating temperature range is −50 to 60 °C (−58 to 140 °F).

== Operations ==
The locomotives were used (2006) on Moscow-Minsk-Brest, Moscow-St. Petersburg-Vainikkala (service to Helsinki, Finland.), and on trains from Moscow to Nizhny-Novgorod and Rostov-on-Don, the locomotives were also used on trains from Moscow to Kazan (2006).

EP10 locomotives have also been used to pull the Capitals Express (Russian: Столичний експрес, romanized: Stolychnyy ekspress) night train between Moscow and Kyiv.

== See also ==
- History of rail transport in Russia

== Sources ==
- Лещев, А.И.; Матекин, С.С.; Усвицкий, С.А.; Кириллов, В.С. (1999), Электровоз двойного питания ЭП10: особенности конструкции и электрических схем, Локомотив (in Russian) (7): 8–19
