= PKP class EP05 =

Class of Polish electric locomotive

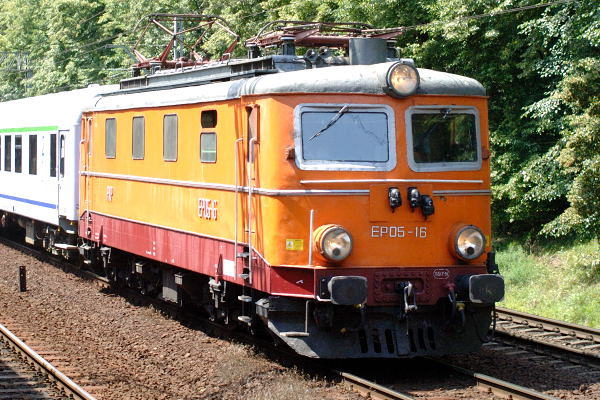
- EP05-16 at Warszawa Ochota station, 2007.
Type and origin
- Power type: Electric
- Rebuilder: PKP (Rebuilt from PKP class EU05)
- Rebuild date: 1973-1977
- Number rebuilt: 27
Specifications
- Configuration
  - UIC: Bo′Bo′
- Gauge: 1,435 mm (4 ft 8 1/2 in) standard gauge
- Wheel diameter: 1,250 mm (49.21 in)
- Length: 16,140 mm (52 ft 11 in)
- Width: 2,950 mm (9 ft 8 in)
- Height: 3,987 mm (13 ft 1 in)
- Axle load: 20.6 tonnes (20.3 long tons; 22.7 short tons)
- Loco weight: 82.5 tonnes (81.2 long tons; 90.9 short tons)
- Electric system/s: 3,000 V DC Catenary
- Current pickup: Pantograph
- Traction motors: 3AL4846ZT, 77:44 gear ratio
- Loco brake: Oerlikon
Performance figures
- Maximum speed: 160 km/h (99 mph)
- Power output: 2,032 kW (2,720 hp)
Career
- Operators: PKP
- Nicknames: Piątka, Czesio

The EP05 (also manufactured as ZNTKiM Gdańsk 44E) is a Polish modification of Czech electric locomotive EU05 used by Polish railway operator (PKP).

== History ==
The locomotive was produced in the years 1957–1960 in three types: 20E1, the prototype, 30E1 and 30E2. In need of modern electric locomotives for passenger trains, and unable to get timely delivery of EU06 locomotives from England, Poland bought 30 locomotives from its southern neighbours.

In 1969, PKP started testing several changes to enable EU05 locomotives to achieve speeds up to 160 km/h (99 mph). First trials were made with the EU05-29 locomotive, and soon it became clear that it was possible to safely achieve speeds up to 170 km/h (106 mph) after changing the transmission rate. The decision was made to rebuild all locomotives of EU05 class during first servicing. As a result, by 1977 almost all locomotives had been rebuilt to EP05 class, except for locomotives 09, 12 and 19, which had been scrapped earlier. To distinguish the new series from its predecessor, the color scheme was changed from two-tone green to orange. All modifications were conducted in Zakłady Naprawcze Taboru Kolejowego in Gdańsk.

In the beginning of the 1980s, EP05 was being prepared for pulling express trains. Most of the engines had had multiple steering and pneumatic devices installed, which allowed them to pull trains with two connected locomotives and operate automatic fixtures. First express train, Górnik (En.: miner) led by EP05 locomotive run in 1984 on Centralna Magistrala Kolejowa, achieving a top speed of 138.2 km/h (86 mph). In the second half of the 1980s the top speed on Centralna Magistrala Kolejowa rose to 160 km/h (99 mph) and as a result EP05 could run at top speed. Some of those engines later had their clutch changed from Secheron to Skoda.

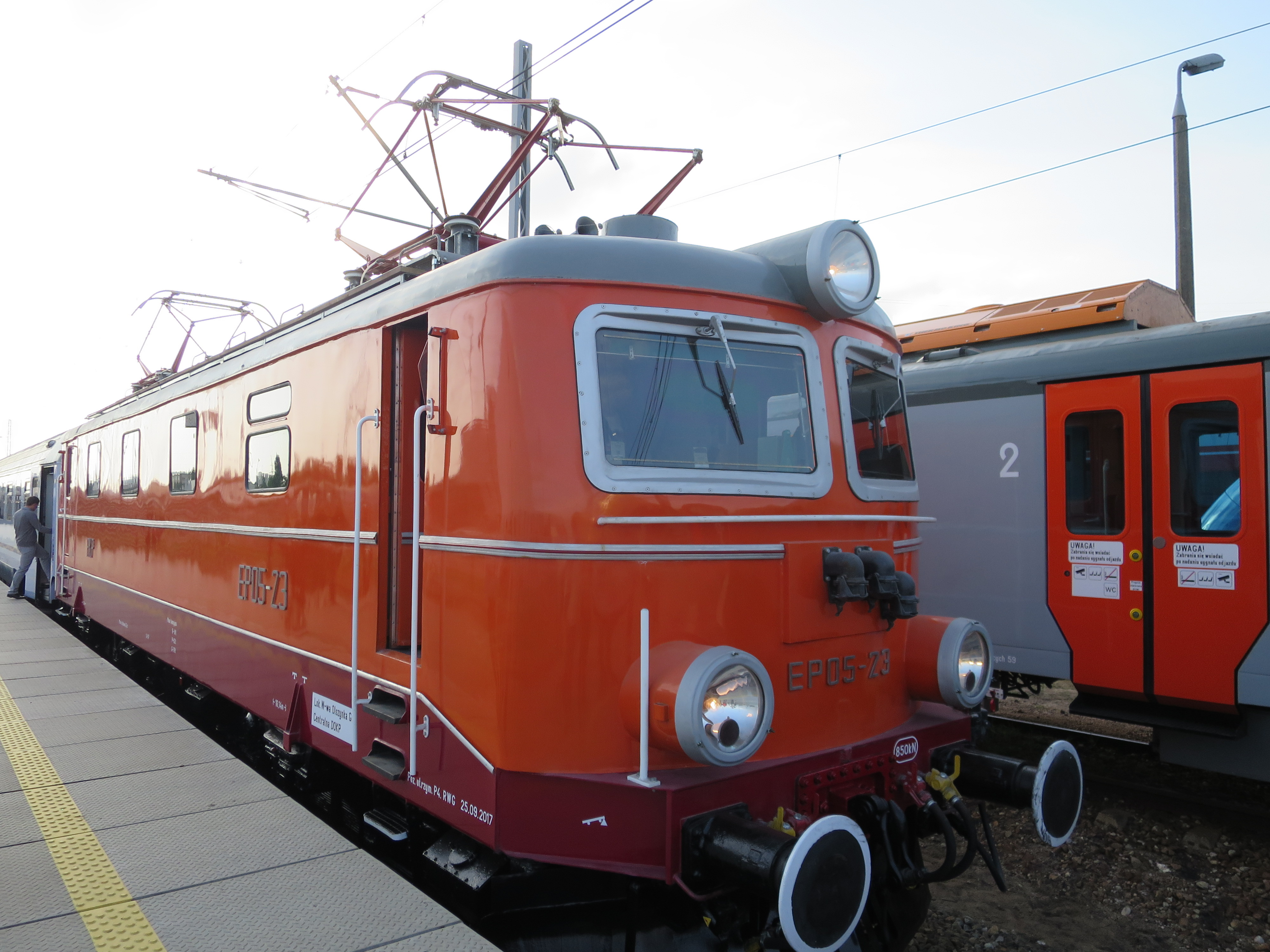
EP05-23

=== Present day ===
Following the introduction of EP09 locomotives, the EP05 started to be withdrawn from service, but remained in service due to several EP09 break downs. Today, one unit (EP05-23) is operated by PKP Cargo, pulling InterCity trains. There is also one EU05 left in service, which is in fact EP05-22 engine, which was repainted in 2003. It served as an exhibit in Kraków. As of 2018, it has been restored and it re-entered regular service at top speeds of 160 km/h. EP05-23 re-entered regular service as an heritage unit in 2017. EP05-23, which was repainted in its original orange livery in the same year, is owned by PKP Intercity.

== Technical data ==
EP05 series locomotive is an electric locomotive which is designed for the haulage of passenger trains. It has driving compartments on either end of the locomotive. It is designed to pull a 600 tonne passenger train at its top speed of 160 km/h on a straight and horizontal railway line.

== Nicknames ==
- Piątka (eng. The Five) - from locos number
- Czesio (eng. The Czech) - from name of country where was produced (Czech Republic)

== See also ==
- EU05
- ChS3
