= VL10 =

Class of 2881 Soviet electric locomotives

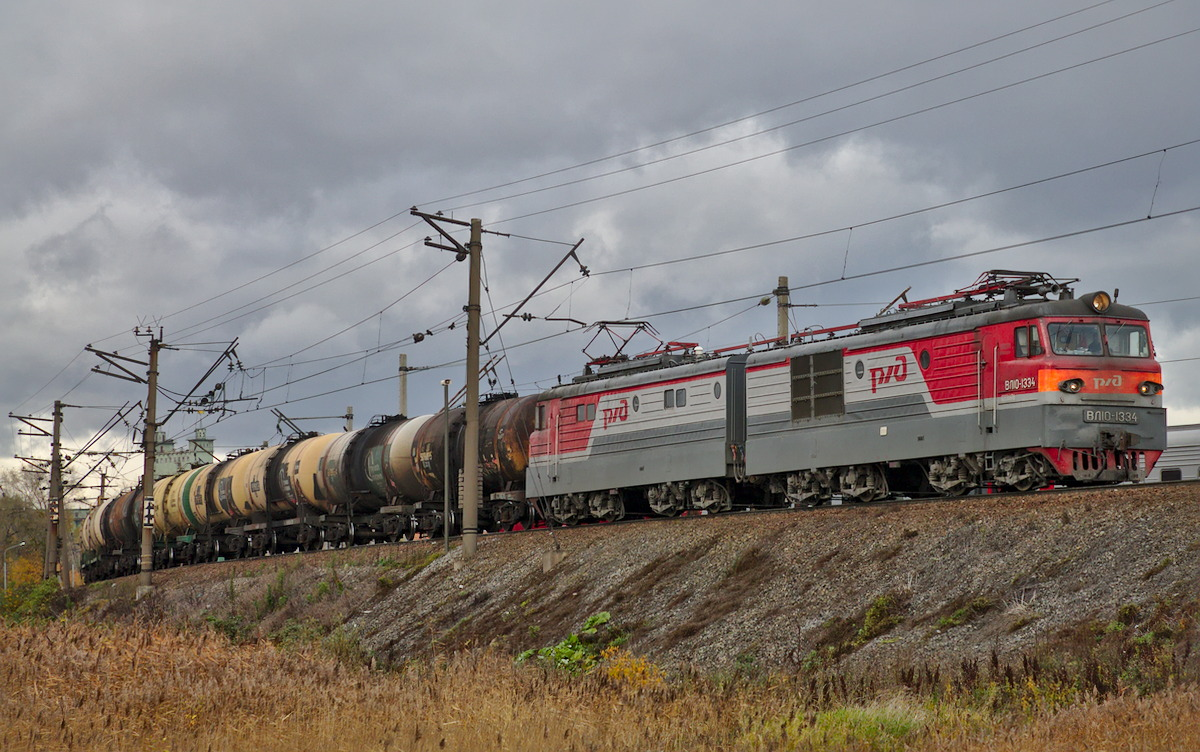
- RŽD ВЛ10-1334 in October 2013 in Saint Petersburg
Type and origin
- Power type: Electric
- Builder: Soviet Union; Tbilisi Electric Locomotive Works, Novocherkassk Electric Locomotive Plant
- Build date: 1961–2005
- Total produced: 2,881
Specifications
- Configuration
  - AAR: B-B + B-B
  - UIC: Bo′Bo′+Bo′Bo′
- Gauge: 1,520 mm (4 ft 11 27/32 in) Russian gauge
- Wheel diameter: 1,250 mm (49.21 in)
- Length: 2×16,420 mm (53 ft 10 1/2 in)
- Width: 3,160 mm (10 ft 4 3/8 in)
- Height: 5,121 mm (16 ft 9 5/8 in)
- Loco weight: VL10: 184 tonnes (181 long tons; 203 short tons); VL10U: 200 tonnes (200 long tons; 220 short tons)
- Electric system/s: 3 kV DC Catenary
- Current pickup: Pantograph
- Traction motors: 8×TED TL-2
- Transmission: Electric
- Loco brake: Regenerative, Railway air brake
- Train brakes: Railway air brake
Performance figures
- Maximum speed: 100 km/h (62 mph)
- Power output: 6,165 hp (4,597 kW)
Career
- Operators: РЖД (RZhD), Ukrainian Railways, Georgian Railway, Abkhazian Railway
- Locale: SUN Soviet Union; RUS Russia; Ukraine; Armenia; Georgia; Azerbaijan; Abkhazia

The VL10 (Russian: ВЛ10) is an electric two-unit mainline DC freight locomotive used in the Soviet Union and is still operated today by the state owned Russian rail company RZhD, Ukrainian Railways, Georgian Railway and Abkhazian Railway The initials VL are those of Vladimir Lenin (Russian: Владимир Ленин), after whom the class is named.

== History ==
The VL10 series was built as a replacement for the ageing VL8 which, by 1960, no longer met Soviet rail requirements. The VL10s were manufactured at the Tbilisi Electric Locomotive Works (ТЭВЗ) between 1961–1977, as well as the Novocherkassk Electric Locomotive Plant (НЭВЗ) during 1969 and 1976. It was also there that all the mechanical components for the series were produced. The first prototype of the VL10 series was built in the Tbilisi works under the designation Т8-001. It was built in 1961 to coincide with the 40th anniversary of Soviet rule in Georgia.

== In popular culture ==
The VL10-792 was in the train simulator Trainz in 2012. In 2024, Polish developer PlayWay released Trans-Siberian Railway Simulator in early access. The protagonist of the story mode operates a VL10 along a section of the Trans-Siberian Railway from Novosibirsk to Krasnoyarsk.

== See also ==
- Novocherkassk Electric Locomotive Plant
- Russian Railway Museum
- Museum of the Moscow Railway (Moscow Rizhsky station)
- History of rail transport in Russia
