= ČSD Class E 499.1 =

Czechoslovak electric locomotive

ČSD class E 499.1 ČD class 141
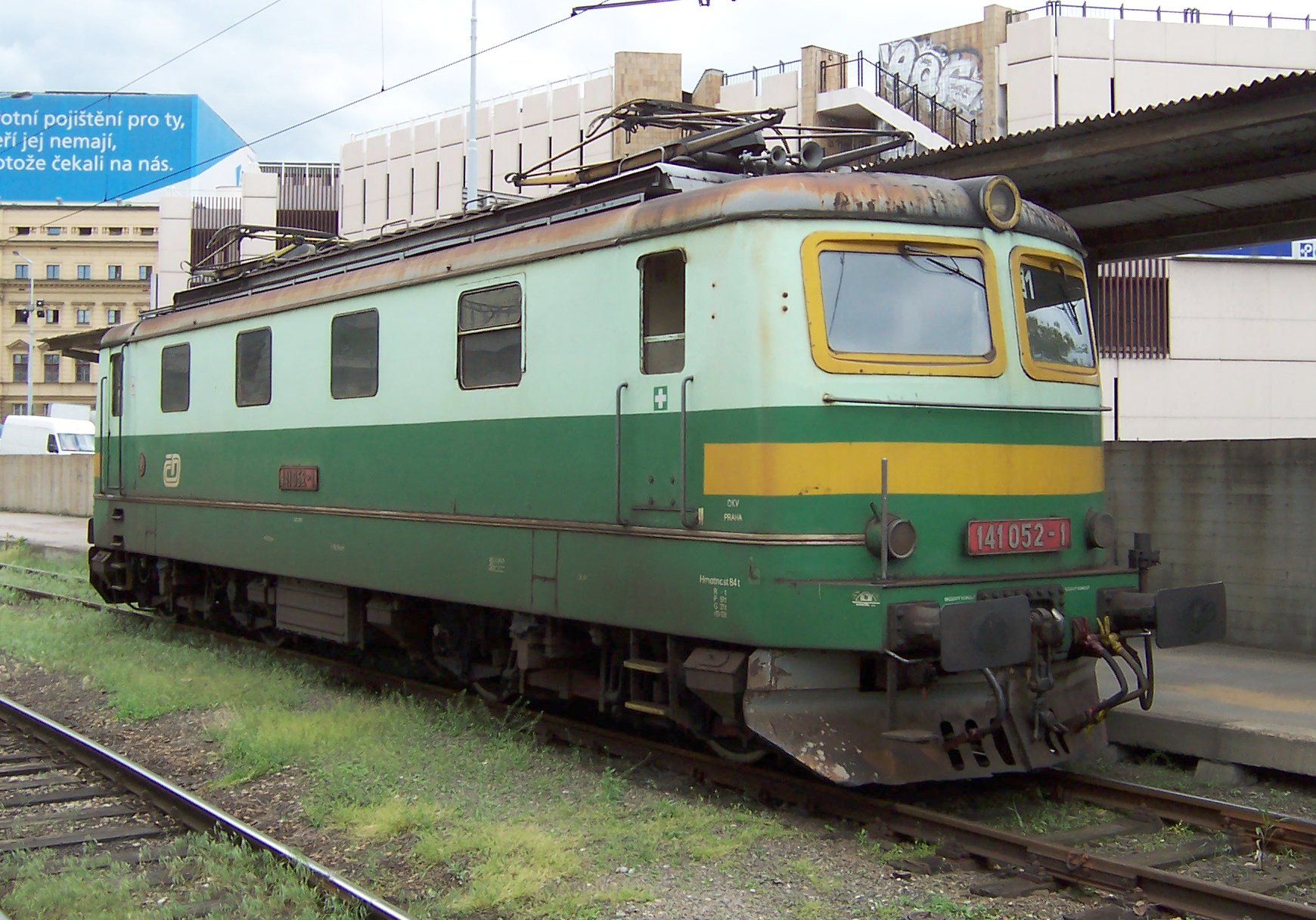
- 141.052 in Prague
Type and origin
- Power type: Electric
- Builder: Škoda Works
- Model: 30E
- Build date: 1957–1961
- Total produced: 148
Specifications
- Configuration
  - UIC: Bo′Bo′
- Gauge: 1,435 mm (4 ft 8 1/2 in) standard gauge or 1,520 mm (4 ft 11 27/32 in)
- Wheel diameter: 1,250 mm (49 in)
- Length: 16,140 mm (52 ft 11 in)
- Width: 2,950 mm (9 ft 8 in)
- Height: 3,987 mm (13 ft 1 in)
- Axle load: 20.6 tonnes (20.3 long tons; 22.7 short tons)
- Loco weight: 82.5 tonnes (81.2 long tons; 90.9 short tons)
- Electric system/s: 3000 V DC Overhead lines
- Current pickup: Pantograph
- Traction motors: 3AL4846ZT, 4 off
- Loco brake: Oerlikon
- Train brakes: Westinghouse W-GP; DAKO DK-GP
Performance figures
- Maximum speed: 120 km/h (75 mph) (84:37 gear ratio)
- Power output: 2,032 kW (2,725 hp)
Career
- Operators: ČD, PKP, Russian Railways
- Class: 141 CZE; EU05 POL; ЧС3 (ChS3) RUS
- Nicknames: Czech (Poland); Bobina (Czech Republic)
- Delivered: 1959 (ČD); 1960 (Russian Railways); 1961 (PKP)
- First run: 1957

Class E 499.1 was an electric locomotive constructed and built by Škoda Works in Plzeň for use in Czechoslovakia by the Czechoslovak State Railways (ČSD). They were also used outside Czechoslovakia in Poland as class EP05 and in the Soviet Union as ЧС3 (ChS3). In North Korea, licence built copies were used (100 series).

After the fall of the iron curtain and consequent upheavals in railway operations they remain in use with a number of railways. Still in the 1980s ČSD locomotives were renumbered to the class 141. After dividing Czechoslovakia in 1993 all locos of this class have remained in Czech Republic.

== History ==
The locomotive was produced in the years 1957–1960 in three types. 20E_{1}, the prototype, different from serial production, 30E_{1} and 30E_{2}. 61 engines were built in those series.

The prototype (E499.101) came into service on February 29, 1959. Most of locomotives stationed in Prague, but some of them were sent to Ústí nad Labem and Česká Třebová. Currently the whole series is being systematically withdrawn with last units used in Prague, Olomouc and Ústí nad Labem.

== Technical data ==
Class E499.1 electric locomotives are used to pull both passenger and freight trains. They have driving cabs on either end of the box. This engine was not suited for multiple steering and shunting purposes. On a straight, horizontal track it could pull 600 t. passenger trains with the speed of up to 120 km/h and 1000 t. freight trains with the speed of 80 km/h.

== Service in other countries ==
=== Poland ===
==== EU05 ====
In need of modern electric locomotives for passenger trains, and unable to get timely delivery of EU06 locomotives from England, Poland bought 30 locomotives Type 44E from its southern neighbours. In 1961 it was the most modern locomotive running on Polish rail tracks. EU05 locomotives pulled fast passenger trains and were based in Warszawa Odolany and later in Warszawa Olszynka Grochowska depots. Those locomotives serviced chiefly connections from Warsaw to Poznań and Katowice.

==== EP05 ====
In 1969 PKP started testing several changes to enable EU05 locomotives to achieve speeds up to 160 km/h. It appeared to be possible thanks to changing the transmission and as a result by 1977 almost all locomotives had been rebuilt to EP05 class, except for locomotives 09, 12 and 19 which had been scrapped earlier. To distinguish the new series from its predecessor, the color scheme was changed from two-tone green to orange.

==== Present day ====
There are two units of EU05/EP05 left in service, which are in fact EP05-22 engine repainted in 2003. It serves as an exhibit in Kraków. And EP05-23 which was obtained by PKP Intercity and repainted into orange livery in 2017. EP05-23 is in planned service as an active exhibit

=== Soviet Union and Russia ===
==== ЧС3 (ChS3) ====
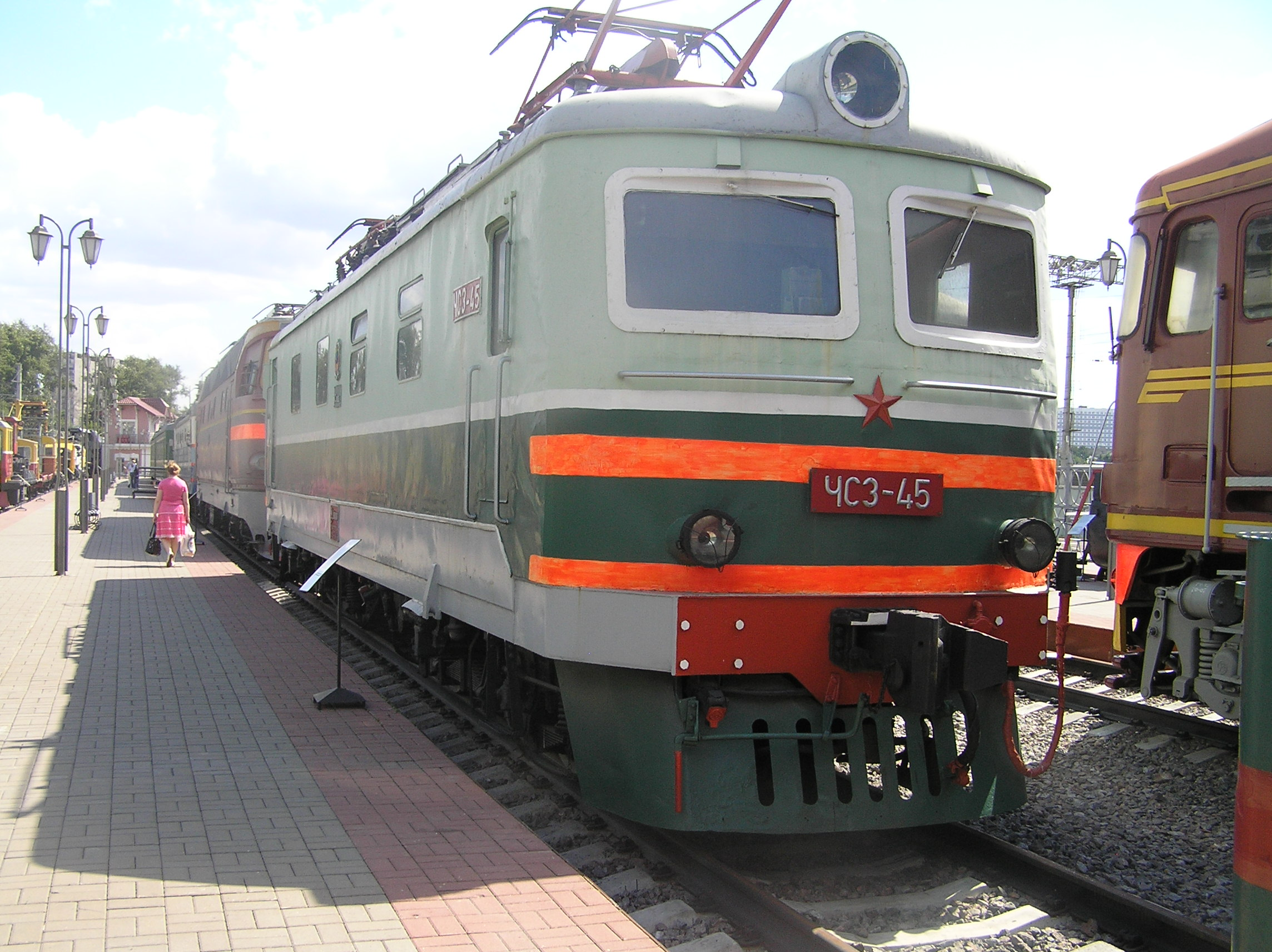
ChS3-45 at the Moscow Railway Museum, Rizhsky Rail Terminal

In 1960 and 1961 87 units of similar type 29E were built for the Soviet Union railways. They were suited to run on the broad gauge rails and received ЧС3 (ChS3) designation. Several units of this locomotive were kept in service by the Russian Railways pulling mostly passenger trains. In Russia ЧС3 were very often used in pairs. The last operational units were converted to maintenance railcars (designated as EM or PEM) and retired by 2012.

=== North Korea ===
After buying a number of Czechoslovak-built Škoda Type 22E_{2} type locomotives to expand its electric locomotive fleet, the Korean State Railway of North Korea obtained a licence, including technology transfer, to produce the Type 30E_{2}. Several of Type 30E_{2} were built by the Kim Chong-t'ae Electric Locomotive Works to gain experience with the design in preparation for the production of the Red Flag 1 class, whose design was based on that of the Type 30E_{2}.

Although the total number of North Korean-built Type 30E_{2}, which were numbered in the 100 series, is unknown, at least one (number 114) is still operational.

== Nicknames ==
- Czech in Polish - from nation of origin
- Piątka (Eng. The Five) in Poland - from locos number
- Bobina in the Czech Republic - from wheel arrangement Bo'Bo'

== See also ==
- List of České dráhy locomotive classes
