= PKP class ET40 =

Locomotive class

ET40
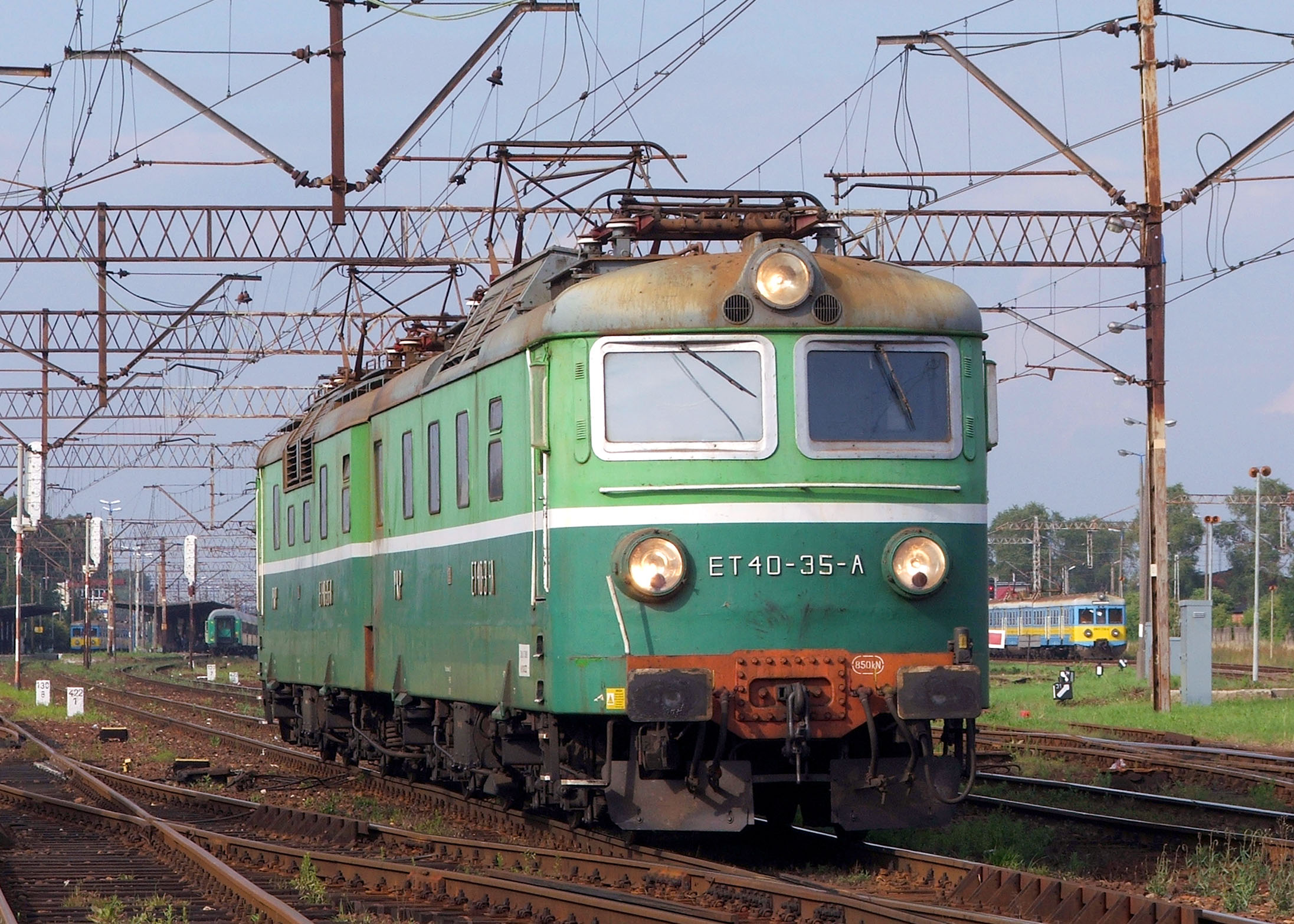
- ET40-35 locomotive in Laskowice Pomorskie, Poland
Type and origin
- Power type: Electric
- Builder: Škoda Works
- Model: 77E1 (first 30 locomotives); 77E2 (last 30 locomotives)
- Build date: 1975–1978
- Total produced: 60
Specifications
- Configuration
  - UIC: Bo′Bo′+Bo′Bo′
- Gauge: 1,435 mm (4 ft 8 1/2 in) standard gauge
- Wheel diameter: 1,250 mm (49.21 in)
- Length: 34,420 mm (112 ft 11 1/8 in)
- Width: 2,950 mm (9 ft 8 1/8 in)
- Height: 3,987 mm (13 ft 1 in)
- Axle load: 20.5 tonnes (20.2 long tons; 22.6 short tons)
- Loco weight: 164 tonnes (161 long tons; 181 short tons)
- Electric system/s: 3000 V DC overhead line
- Current pickup: Pantograph
- Traction motors: 7AL484ZT, 4 off
- Loco brake: Oerlikon
- Train brakes: Air
- Safety systems: SHP
Performance figures
- Maximum speed: 90 km/h (56 mph) (84:27 gear ratio)
- Power output: 4,080 kW (5,470 hp)
- Tractive effort: 490 kN (110,000 lbf)
Career
- Operators: PKP
- Class: ET40
- Number in class: 60
- Nicknames: Bomba, Bombowiec (the Bomb, Bomber)
- Delivered: 1975

ET40 is the name for Bo′Bo′+Bo′Bo′ two-unit freight electric locomotive in service of Polish national rail operator, PKP. The locomotive was produced by Škoda Works in the Czechoslovakia.

== History ==
During the 1960s and 1970s, a massive increase in freight transport was seen in Poland, especially on the routes between Silesian coal mines and Polish Baltic ports. In the beginning of the 1970s, the whole Trunk Coal Line (Pl: Magistrala Węglowa), which was the main route for exporting Polish coal, had been electrified. This situation caused an urgent need for suitable locomotives able to pull heavy freight trains. As a result,` negotiations with Škoda Works in Plzeň started. Poland sent an order for 60 articulated freight locomotives, based on the EU05, which was currently in service at the time.

As of 2007, ET40 locomotives work mostly for Bydgoszcz engine shed, but in 2000 several units were sent to Wrocław in order to serve on the highland Wrocław-Jelenia Góra line, where they are intended to replace ET21 locomotives.

=== Further innovations ===
One locomotive from the series - ET40-41 was rebuilt in 1990 into EP40 standard for high-speed passenger trains (up to 160 km/h), but as the result was not satisfactory, PKP resigned from further modernisations and the only EP40 was rebuilt back to ET40 standard in 1993.

== Technical data ==
As a development of EU05 locomotive the ET40 technical features are in many ways similar to its predecessor, this refers mostly to the electric installation. The main differences are in the transmission and cooling system. The locomotive consists of two mechanically and electrically identical sections. Each part has a crew compartment on one end and doors on the other, which enable moving between sections. It is possible to drive sections separately after they have been disconnected. Sections are distinguished by an additional letter A and B added to the locomotive's designation.

ET40 is a Bo′Bo′+Bo′Bo′ locomotive, meaning it is an articulated engine with two cabs fixed to the frames placed on two bogies. Each bogie has two driving axles and each axle is propelled separately by 7AL-484ZT traction motor with 510 kW constant power. Its parameters allow the machine to pull freight trains of approximately 4,000 t. weight.

Crew compartments provide convenient driving of the machine in both directions. Entrance is possible through the doors on both sides of the locomotive. Crew compartments are heated with a fan powered electrically; windscreens are equipped with de-freezers and wipers. On the rear side of the crew section a locker for clothes and electric devices is mounted. Entry to the mechanical compartment is possible through two doors. The right one leads to high voltage section, whilst the left provide access to the other crew compartment through a corridor running along the whole locomotive.

The mechanical compartment is divided into three parts. Auxiliary fixtures, like traction motors cooling systems, resistors and main compressor are located in the rear part of the section. Refrigerator, washbasin and cooker occupied the front part of the corridor.

The ET40 locomotive is equipped with an electro-pneumatic device to level otherwise unequal load on the track. The machine is equipped with two pneumatic brakes - one automatic Oerlikon and additionally, braking only one section. Locomotives numbered from 01 to 30 had one pantograph per section, whilst those numbered from 31 to 60 had two pantographs per section. Traction motors are connected with a series connection with voltage for each motor being 1500 V. They are cooled by two fans (one fan for two engines) with the air supplied by two intakes in the roof of the locomotive. Air for braking systems is provided by two compressors (one for each section) with nominal power of 140 m^{3}/h.

== Nicknames ==
- Bombowiec (The Bomber)
- Bomba (The Bomb)
