= China Railways SL6 =

4-6-2 steam locomotive

China Railways SL6 (胜利6) South Manchuria Railway Pashiro class (パシロ) Manchukuo National Pashiro class (パシロ) North China Transport Pashiro class (パシロ) Central China Railway KC100 class Korean State Railway Pasiyu class (바시유)
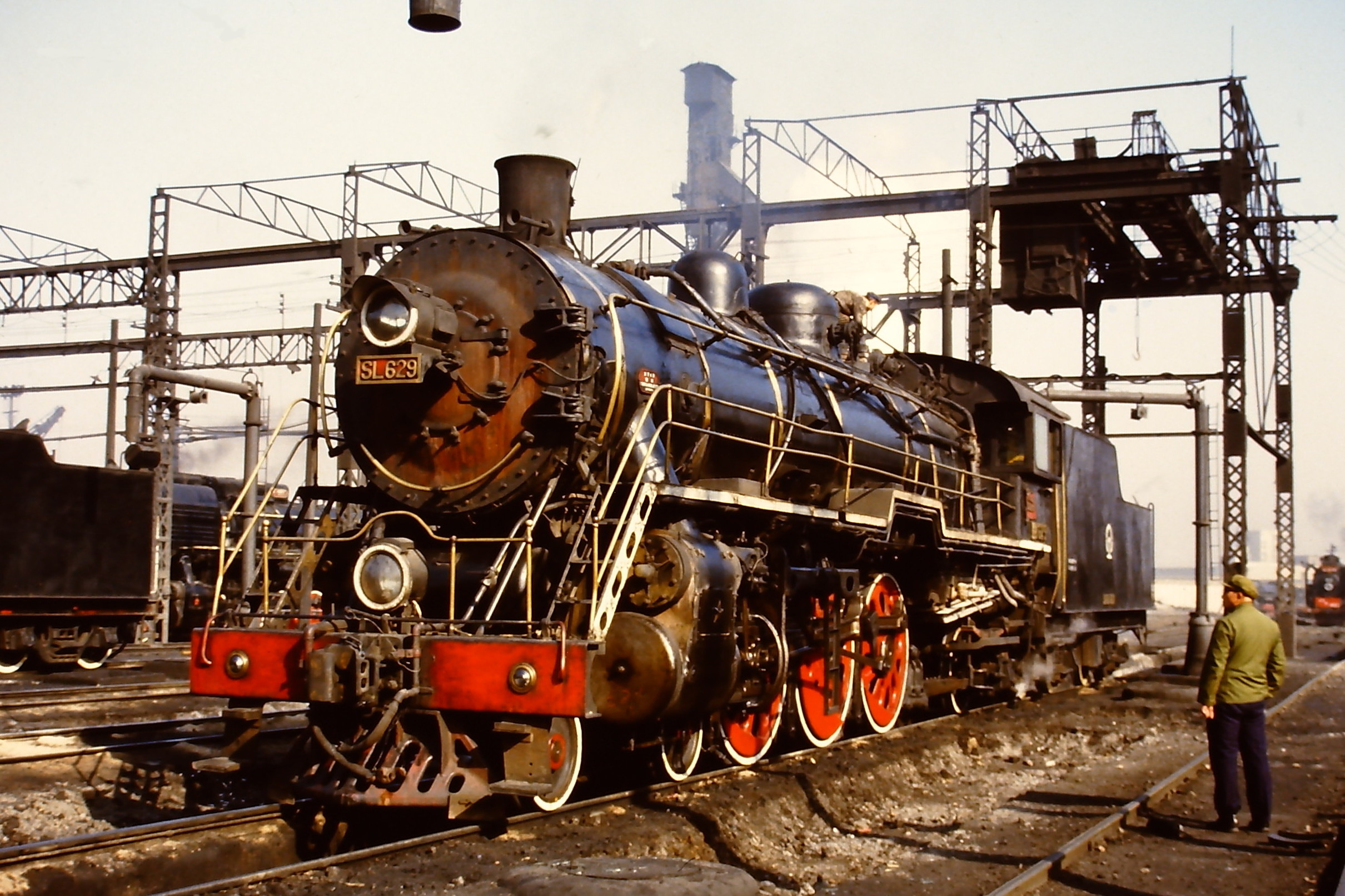
- China Railways SL6-629 at Shenyang
Type and origin
- Power type: Steam
- Builder: Kawasaki, Kisha Seizō, Hitachi, Shahekou, Nippon Sharyō, Sifang
- Build date: 1933-1958
- Total produced: 422
Specifications
- Configuration
  - Whyte: 4-6-2
- Gauge: 1,435 mm (4 ft 8 1/2 in) standard gauge
- Fuel type: Coal
- Cylinders: Two, outside
Career
- Operators: China Railway
- Delivered: 1933
- Preserved: Two
- Disposition: Two preserved, remainder scrapped

The China Railways SL6 (勝利6, Shènglì, "victory") is the People's Republic's designation for a class of 4-6-2 "Pacific" superheated two-cylinder passenger steam locomotives operated by the China Railway. Originally built for the South Manchuria Railway (Mantetsu), the Manchukuo National Railway, the Central China Railway and the North China Transportation Company by several Japanese manufacturers between 1934 and 1940, they were the most numerous class of steam passenger locomotive in China, with 422 eventually built.

== History ==
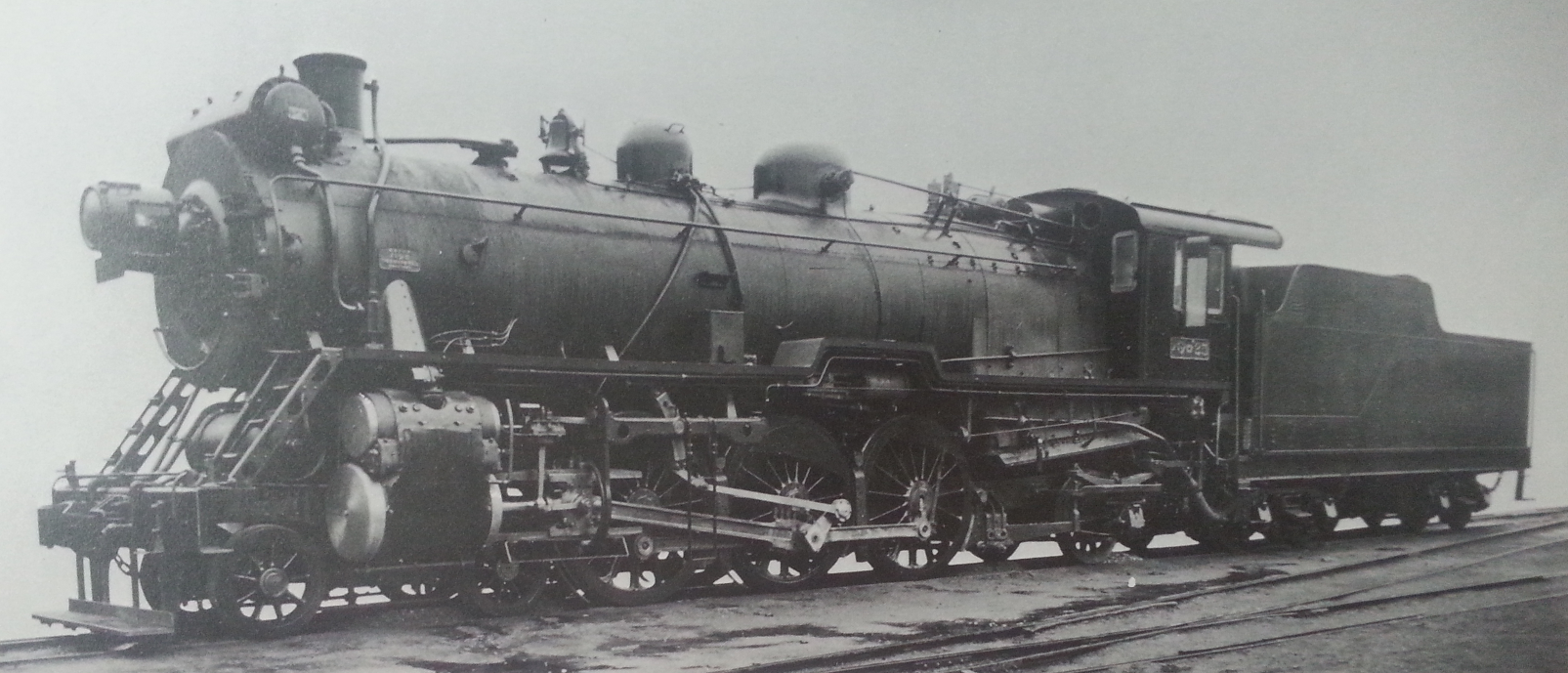
Mantetsu パシロ25 (Pashiro-25)

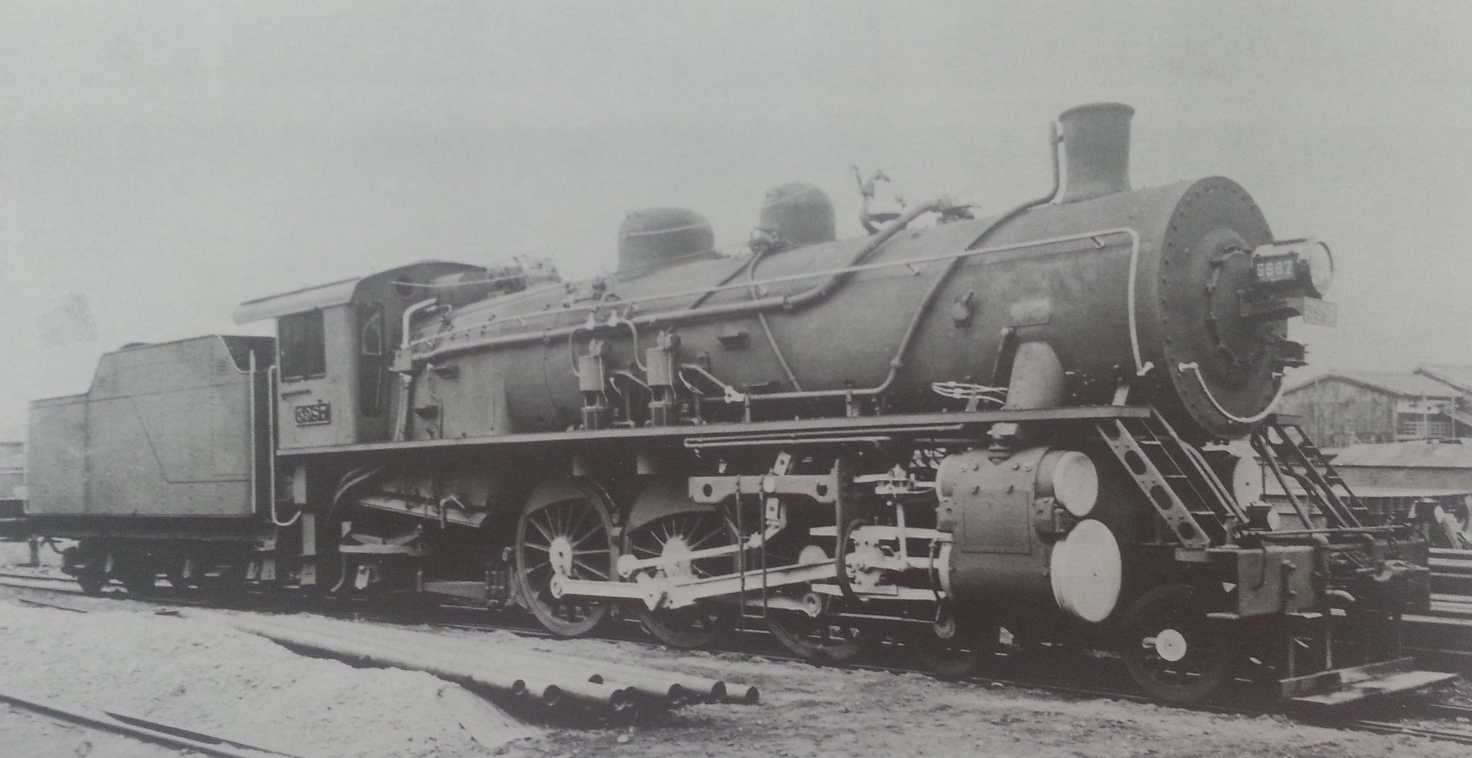
Manchukuo National パシク5987 (Pashiku-5987)

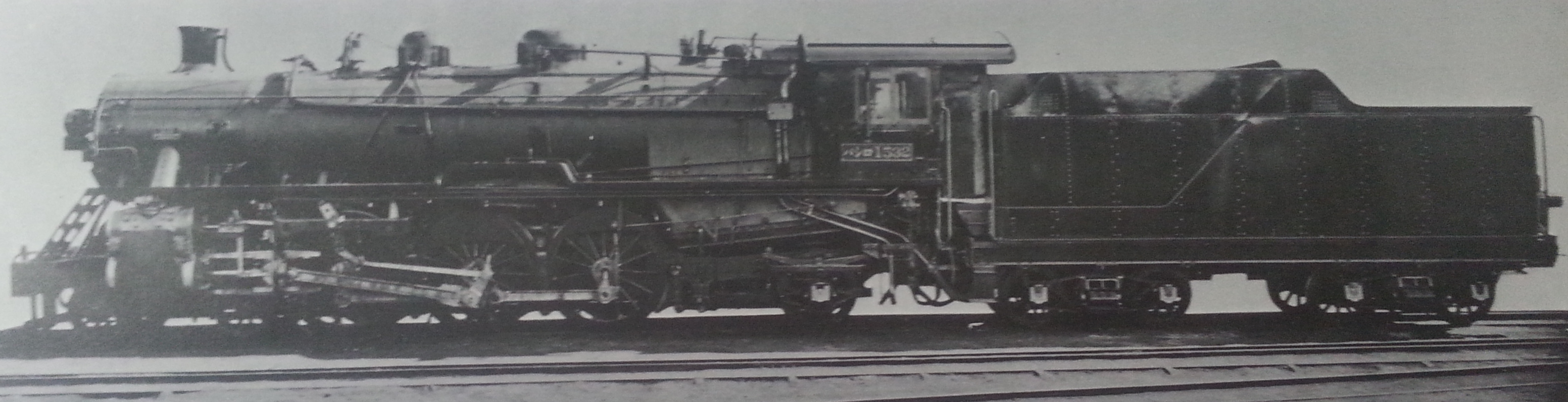
North China Transport パシロ1532 (Pashiro-1532)

The "National Large Pashi", also called the "Duntu Pashi" (敦圖パシ), were ordered in 1933 for use on the newly opened Jingtu Line between Xinjing (Changchun) and Tumen and connecting to Hoeryeong in Korea. A total of nineteen, classified "Pashi" (パシ) class, were built by Kawasaki, Kisha Seizō and Hitachi, fourteen for use on both express and ordinary passenger trains on the Jingtu Line, and five for use on the Haike (Keshan–Bei'an) and Taike lines (Tai'an–Keshan) at the same time. In September 1933 they were reclassified "Pashiku" (パシク) class.

The "New National Large Pashi" was a variant of the earlier subclass which omitted the feedwater heater and had a smaller tender, in order to fit some of the shorter turntables in use by the Manchukuo National. A total of 125 units were built by Kawasaki, Hitachi, and Nippon Sharyō between 1937 and 1944.

Needing to make up for the shortage of locomotives for ordinary passenger trains after the transfer of Pashii and Pashisa class locomotives to the Manchukuo National Railway, Mantetsu ordered fourteen locomotives similar to the Manchukuo National's "National Large Pashi" (國大パシ), also known as "Duntu Pashi" (敦圖パシ). The first twelve, designated Pashiro class, were built by Hitachi in 1934. Another eight came from Hitachi, Kawasaki and Mantetsu's Shahekou Works in 1936–1938, followed by 25 more from Kawasaki between 1940 and 1943. These engines were an intermediate stage between the Pashishi and Pashiko classes. The Pashiko class had been the first Mantetsu class equipped with a combustion chamber firebox; the Pashiro class included this feature, and also was the first class of Mantetsu steam locomotives fitted with a feedwater heater. They also had the largest tenders of any Mantetsu steam locomotive.

Both the Mantetsu Pashiro class and the Manchukuo National Pashiku class locomotives were used for hauling the Asia Express between Xinjing and Harbin after the track was upgraded. They were also used on the "Kōa" and "Tairiku" limited express trains that travelled between Beijing and Busan, Korea, as well as for other regular express and ordinary passenger trains.

With the introduction of the unified classification system of 1938, the Mantetsu Pashiro class and the Manchukuo National and North China Transport Pashiku class locomotives were grouped together under the Pashiro designation.

In 1938, twelve Manchukuo National Pashiku class engines (numbers 566–569 and 571–578, all of the "New Large" type) were transferred to North China Transport, and in 1941 North China Transport ordered another 57 identical units from Kawasaki, numbered 1533–1589.

In 1941, eight were built by Kawasaki for the Central China Railway, which designated them KC100 class, numbered KC1001 through KC1008.

The Chosen Government Railway operated 25 that it received on loan from the Manchukuo National.

Owner	Class and numbers (1933–1938)	Class and numbers (1938–1945)	Builder	Years Built	Total	Notes
Mantetsu	パシロ900–パシロ911	パシロ1–パシロ12	Hitachi	1934	12	
Mantetsu	パシロ912–パシロ919	パシロ13–パシロ20	Hitachi, Kawasaki, Shahekou	1936–1938	8	
Mantetsu	-	パシロ21–パシロ45	Kawasaki	1940–1943	25	
Manchukuo National	パシ800–パシ813 (to 9/33) パシク5950–パシク5963	パシロ501–パシロ514	Kawasaki, Kisha Seizō, Hitachi	1933	14	"National Large Pashi" (國小パシ), for Jingtu Line
Manchukuo National	パシ814–パシ818 (to 9/33) パシク5964–パシク5968	パシロ515–パシロ519	Kawasaki, Kisha Seizō, Hitachi	1933	5	"National Large Pashi" (國小パシ), for Haike & Taike Lines
Manchukuo National	パシク5969–パシク5999	パシロ520–パシロ550	Kawasaki, Kisha Seizō, Hitachi	1935–1937	31	"New National Large Pashi" (新國小パシ)
Manchukuo National	パシク15900–パシク15914	パシロ551–パシロ565	Kawasaki, Nippon Sharyō, Hitachi	1937	15	"New National Large Pashi" (新國小パシ)
Manchukuo National	パシク15915–パシク15918	パシロ566–パシロ569 (1st)	Kawasaki, Nippon Sharyō	1937	4	"New National Large Pashi" (新國小パシ), to North China Traffic パシロ1501–パシロ1504
Manchukuo National	パシク15919	パシロ570	Kawasaki	1937	1	"New National Large Pashi" (新國小パシ)
Manchukuo National	パシク15920–パシク15927	パシロ571–パシロ578 (1st)	Kawasaki, Nippon Sharyō, Hitachi	1937	8	"New National Large Pashi" (新國小パシ), to North China Traffic パシロ1505–パシロ1512
Manchukuo National	-	パシロ566–パシロ569 (2nd)	Hitachi	1938	4	"New National Large Pashi" (新國小パシ), replaced transferred units
Manchukuo National	-	パシロ571–パシロ578 (2nd)	Hitachi	1938	8	"New National Large Pashi" (新國小パシ), replaced transferred units
Manchukuo National	-	パシロ579–パシロ632	Hitachi, Kawasaki	1938–1944	54	"New National Large Pashi" (新國小パシ)
North China	-	パシロ1533–パシロ1589	Kawasaki	1941–1944	57	"New National Large Pashi" (新國小パシ)
Central China	-	KC1001–KC1008	Kawasaki	1941	8	"New National Large Pashi" (新國小パシ)
Total					254	

== Postwar ==
=== China Railways SL6 (胜利6) ===
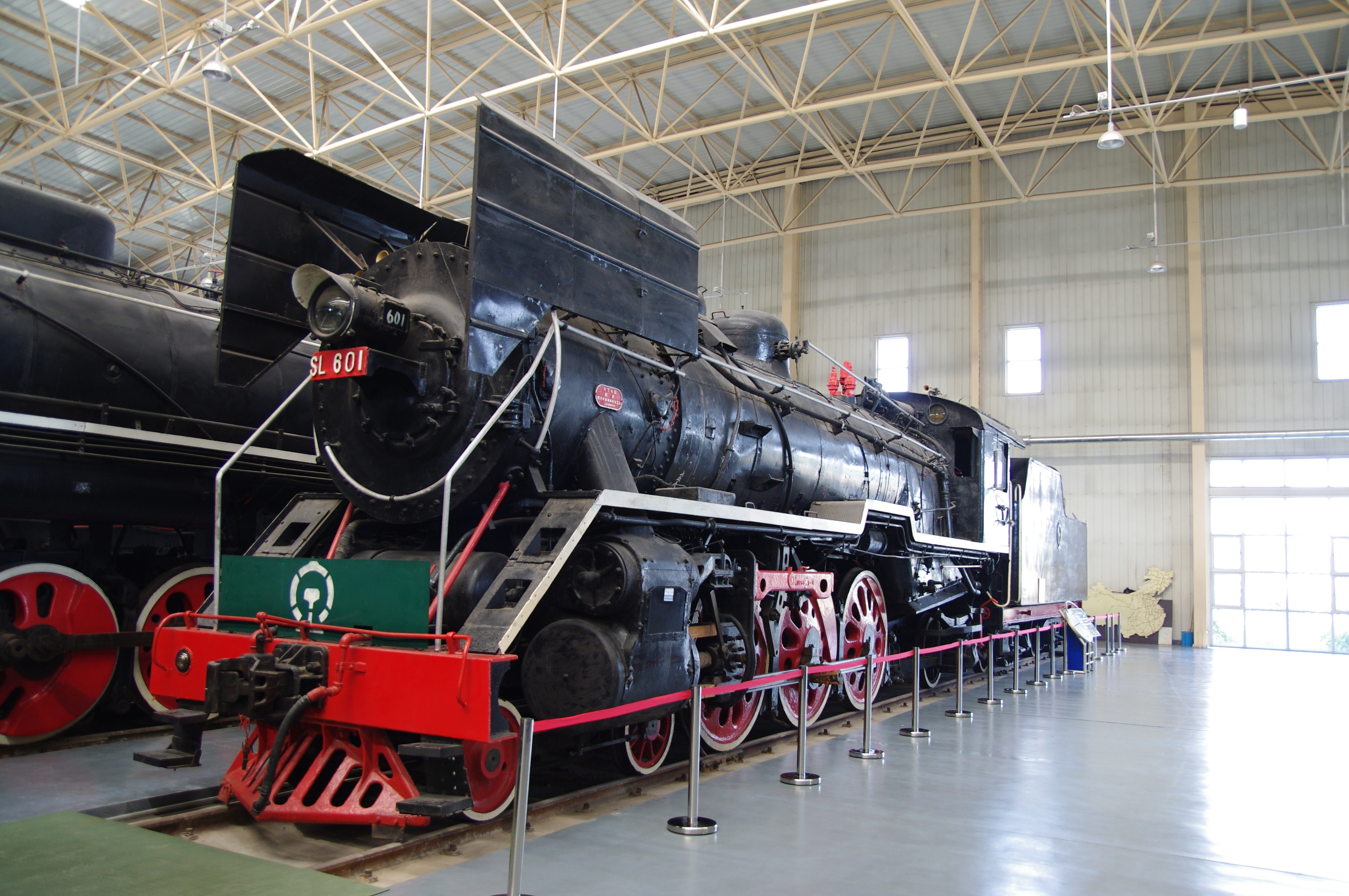
SL6-601

At the end of the Second Sino-Japanese War, a total of 272 Pashiro class locomotives were taken over by the Republic of China Railway - 177 from Mantetsu and the Manchukuo National, 69 from North China Transport, 8 from the Central China Railway, plus another 18 from other railways. After the establishment of the People's Republic and the creation of the current China Railway, these locomotives were designated class ㄆㄒ陸 (PX6) in 1951, and in 1959 they were renamed class SL6 (胜利, Shènglì, "victory") and numbered 301-572. In common with many steam classes, the cabside number often didn't include the suffix, so SL6 631 would have SL631 painted on the loco.

Between 1956 and 1958, the China Railway's Sifang Locomotive Works in Qingdao built a further 151 units, numbered 601-750 and 771, passing over the numbers used by the SL7 (formerly Pashina) class locomotives. They were the mainstay of the China Railway's passenger transportation for many years, being used all over China including places as diverse as Nanning, Nanjing, Hailar and Shizuishan. However, as the weight of passenger trains increased in the 1970s and 1980s, they were progressively relegated to secondary duties. By 1990, most of the survivors were concentrated in Manchuria, at Dashiqiao, Jilin and Baicheng depots, whilst at the other end of the country, a few remained in use at Chengdu. The final three, Sifang-built engines SL6 631, 635, and 680, remained in service at Jilin until 1991.

=== Korean State Railway 바시유 (Pasiyu) class ===
Of the 25 Pashiro-class locomotives which had been loaned to the Chosen Government Railway and were still in Korea at the end of the Pacific War likely all ended up with the Korean State Railway in North Korea, as no record of them being operated in South Korea exists. In the north, they were designated 바시유 (Pasiyu) class, and were likely retired by the end of the 1960s.

== Preservation ==
- SL6-601: is preserved at the Beijing Railway Museum.
- SL6-724: was plinthed at the driver training school at Hohhot.

== Class Specifications ==
	Pashiro (Mantetsu)	Pashiku (MNR Large Pashi)	Pashiku (New MNR Large Pashi)	SL6
Builder	Hitachi, Kawasaki, Shahekou	Kawasaki, Hitachi, Nippon Sharyō, Kisha Seizō	Kawasaki, Hitachi, Nippon Sharyō	Sifang
Build date	1934–1943	1933	1936–1940	1956–1958
Driver diameter	1,750 mm (68 7/8 in)	1,750 mm (68 7/8 in)	1,750 mm (68 7/8 in)	1,750 mm (68 7/8 in)
Length	23,768 mm (77 ft 11 3/4 in)	22,390 mm (73 ft 5 1/2 in)	22,424 mm (73 ft 6 7/8 in)	22,618 mm (74 ft 2 1/2 in)
Width	3,074 mm (10 ft 1 in)	3,074 mm (10 ft 1 in)	3,074 mm (10 ft 1 in)	
Height	4,547 mm (14 ft 11 in)	4,547 mm (14 ft 11 in)	4,547 mm (14 ft 11 in)	
Loco Weight	102.03 t (100.42 long tons; 112.47 short tons)	100.67 t (99.08 long tons; 110.97 short tons)	100.67 t (99.08 long tons; 110.97 short tons)	100.23 t (98.65 long tons; 110.48 short tons)
Tender Weight	83.23 t (81.92 long tons; 91.75 short tons)	71.00 t (69.88 long tons; 78.26 short tons)	73.01 t (71.86 long tons; 80.48 short tons)	72.34 t (71.20 long tons; 79.74 short tons)
Adhesive weight	61.75 t (60.77 long tons; 68.07 short tons)	62.21 t (61.23 long tons; 68.57 short tons)	62.21 t (61.23 long tons; 68.57 short tons)	62.21 t (61.23 long tons; 68.57 short tons)
Valve gear	Walschaerts	Walschaerts	Walschaerts	Walschaerts
Tractive effort	144.0 kN (32,400 lb_{f})	142.99 kN (32,150 lb_{f})	142.99 kN (32,150 lb_{f})	165.5 kN (37,200 lb_{f})
Cylinder size	570 mm × 660 mm (22.44 in × 25.98 in)	570 mm × 660 mm (22.44 in × 25.98 in)	570 mm × 660 mm (22.44 in × 25.98 in)	570 mm × 660 mm (22.44 in × 25.98 in)
Boiler pressure	14.0 kgf/cm^{2} (199 psi)	14.0 kgf/cm^{2} (199 psi)	14.0 kgf/cm^{2} (199 psi)	14.0 kgf/cm^{2} (199 psi)
Firegrate area	4.82 m^{2} (51.9 sq ft)	4.82 m^{2} (51.9 sq ft)	4.82 m^{2} (51.9 sq ft)	4.84 m^{2} (52.1 sq ft)
Heating surface	266.80 m^{2} (2,871.8 sq ft)	266.80 m^{2} (2,871.8 sq ft)	266.80 m^{2} (2,871.8 sq ft)	
Superheater area	67.20 m^{2} (723.3 sq ft)	67.20 m^{2} (723.3 sq ft)	67.20 m^{2} (723.3 sq ft)	
Tube area	177.00 m^{2} (1,905.2 sq ft)	177.00 m^{2} (1,905.2 sq ft)	177.00 m^{2} (1,905.2 sq ft)	
Firebox area	22.60 m^{2} (243.3 sq ft)	22.60 m^{2} (243.3 sq ft)	22.60 m^{2} (243.3 sq ft)	
Small tubes (Number x diameter)	125 x 51 mm (2.01 in)	125 x 51 mm (2.01 in)	125 x 51 mm (2.01 in)	
Large tubes (Number x diameter)	36 x 137 mm (5.39 in)	36 x 137 mm (5.39 in)	36 x 137 mm (5.39 in)	
Water capacity	35.00 m^{3} (1,236 cu ft)	25.00 m^{3} (883 cu ft)	30.00 m^{3} (1,059 cu ft)	30.00 m^{3} (1,059 cu ft)
Fuel capacity	15.00 t (14.76 long tons; 16.53 short tons)	17.00 t (16.73 long tons; 18.74 short tons)	14.00 t (13.78 long tons; 15.43 short tons)	14.00 t (13.78 long tons; 15.43 short tons)
Operator	South Manchuria Railway; China Railway	Manchukuo National Railway; China Railway	Manchukuo National Railway; North China Transport; Central China Railway; Chosen Government Railway; China Railway	China Railway
Numbers in class	45	19	190	151
