= China Railways RM =

Class of Chinese steam locomotives

RM 人民
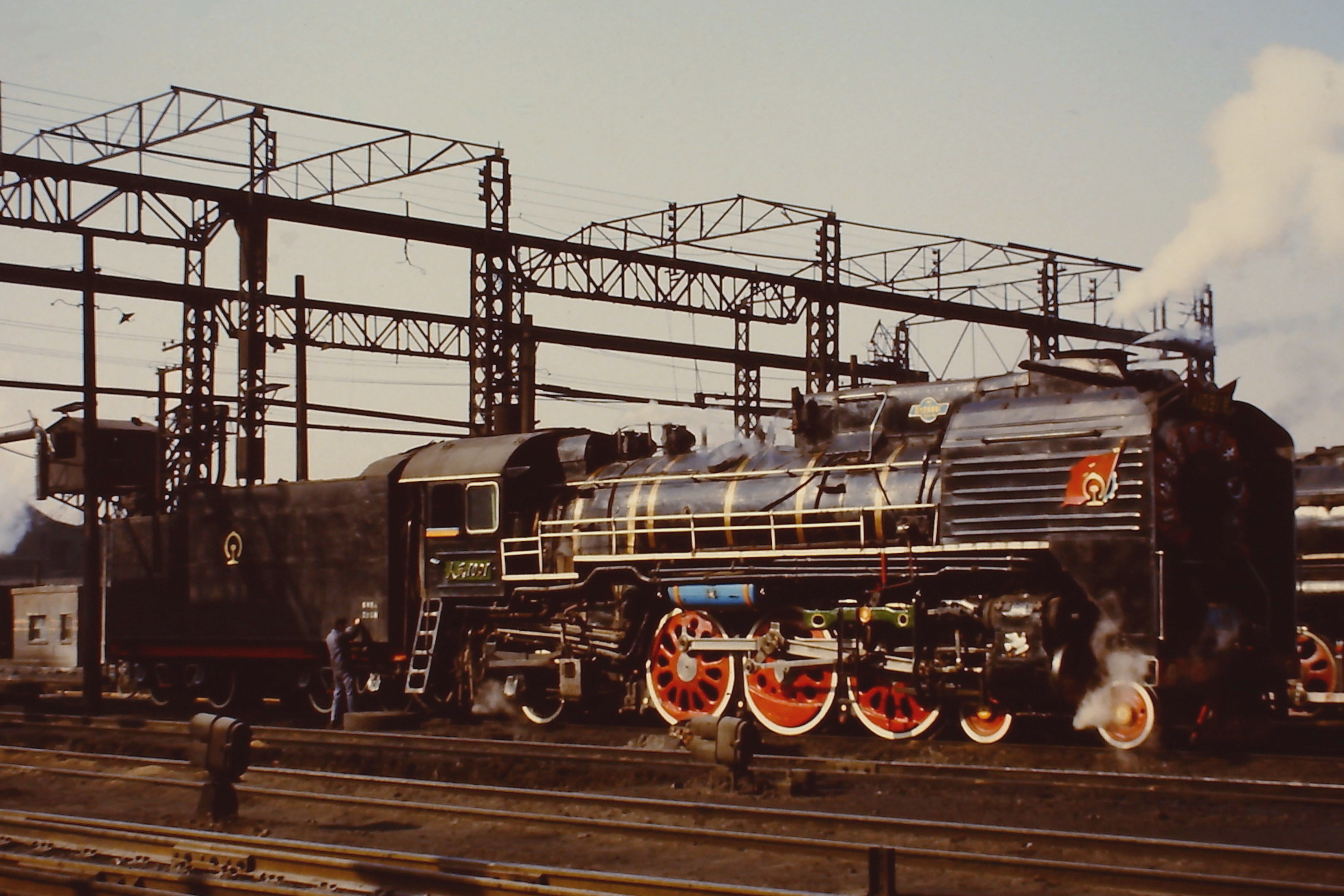
- RM–1091
Type and origin
- Power type: Steam
- Builder: CSR Sifang Co Ltd.
- Serial number: RM 1001–1258
- Build date: 1958–1966
- Total produced: 258
Specifications
- Configuration
  - Whyte: 4-6-2
- Gauge: 1,435 mm (4 ft 8 1/2 in)
- Driver dia.: 1,750 mm (68.9 in)
- Length: 23.2 m (76 ft 1.4 in)
- Fuel type: Coal
- Tender cap.: 15 t (14.8 long tons; 16.5 short tons) (coal), 25 m^{3} (883 cu ft) (water)
- Cylinders: Two, outside
- Cylinder size: 570 mm × 660 mm (22.441 in × 25.984 in) bore x stroke
- Valve gear: Walschaerts
- Loco brake: Air
- Train brakes: Air
- Couplers: Knuckle
Performance figures
- Maximum speed: 110 km/h (68 mph)
- Power output: 1,397 hp (1,042 kW) (at wheels)
Career
- Operators: China Railway
- Number in class: 258
- Numbers: 1001–1258
- Delivered: 1958
- First run: 1958
- Last run: 1999
- Retired: 1980–1999
- Preserved: 2
- Scrapped: 1982–2005
- Disposition: 2 preserved, remainder scrapped

The China Railways RM (Chinese: 人民; pinyin: rén mín; lit. 'people') type steam locomotive was a type of 4-6-2 "Pacific" mainline general purpose type steam locomotives. They were built from 1958–1966 with a total of 258 built they were numbered 1001–1258. The locomotives pulled both passengers and freight trains all over the Railway during the Maoist and Dengist Era but were later withdrawn and scrapped starting in the 1980s, with the last ones withdrawn between 1990 and 1999.

== Preservation ==
- RM-1001 is preserved at the China Railway Museum.
- RM-1247 is preserved at Shenyang Railway Museum.
- RM-1163 is preserved in Hyōgo, Japan, but only the front half is preserved after the locomotive was scrapped in 2006.
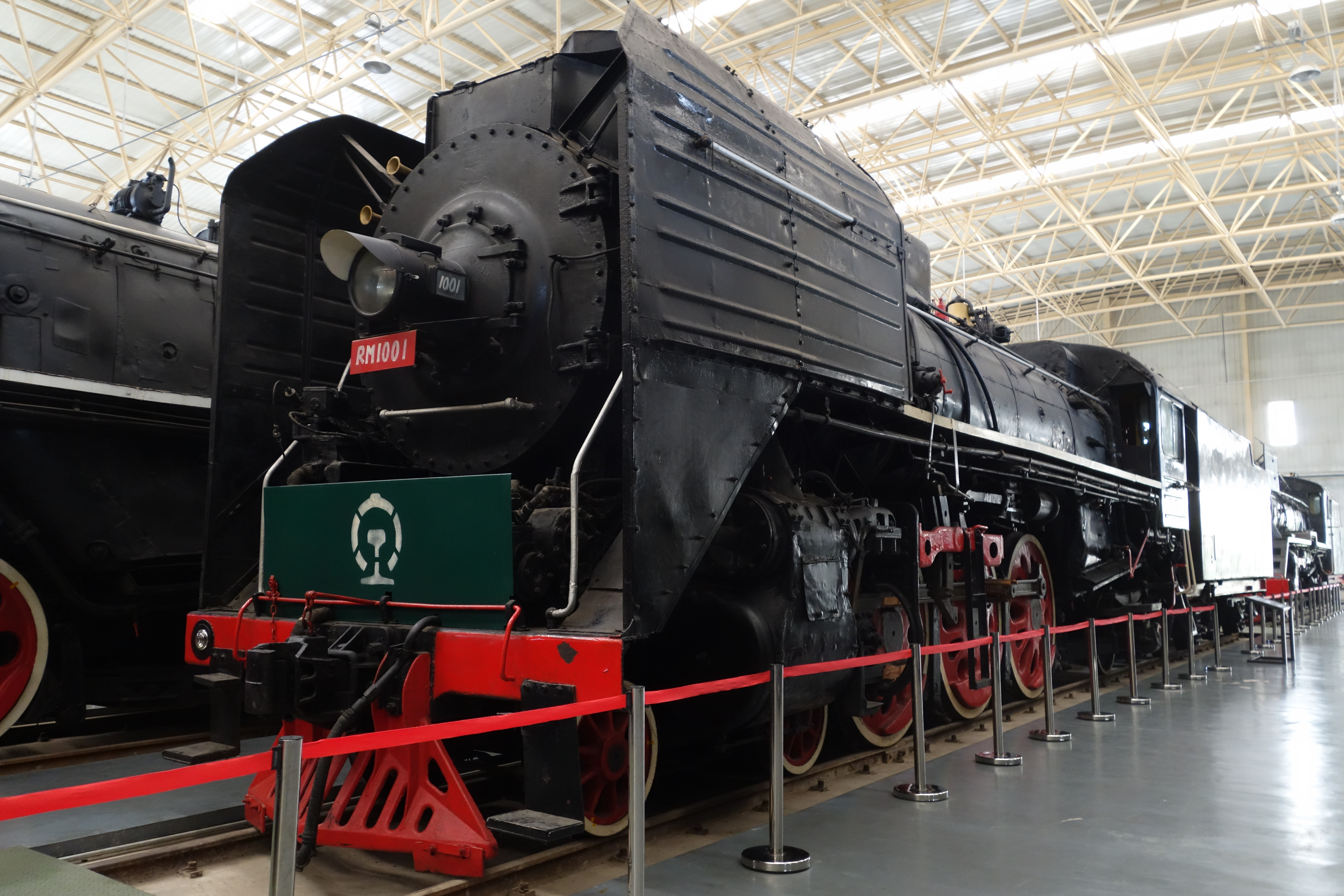
RM-1001

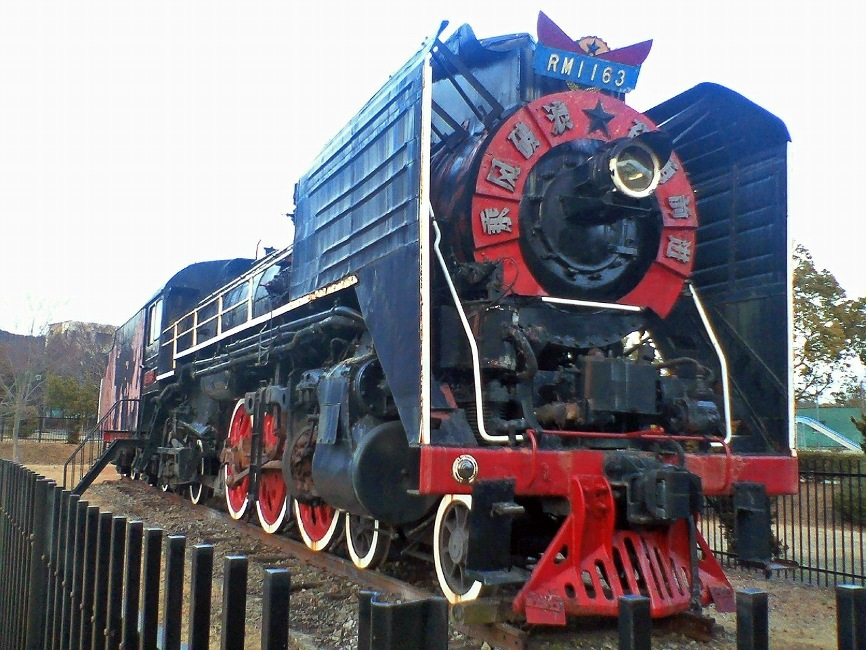
RM-1163

== In fiction ==
In the 2016 animated film Thomas & Friends: The Great Race, the 2018 animated film Thomas & Friends: Big World! Big Adventures! and Thomas & Friends Series 22, 23 and 24, a Chinese character named Yong Bao is based on the RM Class Locomotive .

== See also ==
- China Railways JS
- China Railways SL6
- China Railways SL7
