= SL4 =

SL4 may refer to:

- London Buses route SL4, a bus route in London, United Kingdom
- Route SL4 (MBTA), a bus route in Boston, Massachusetts, United States
- SL4, a postcode district in the SL postcode area in the United Kingdom
- China Railways SL4, a type of steam locomotive
- Jackson Soloist SL4, a model of electric guitar
