= China Railways SL5 =

Class of 4-6-2 passenger steam locomotives

China Railways SL5 (勝利5) Mantetsu Pashiko class (パシコ)
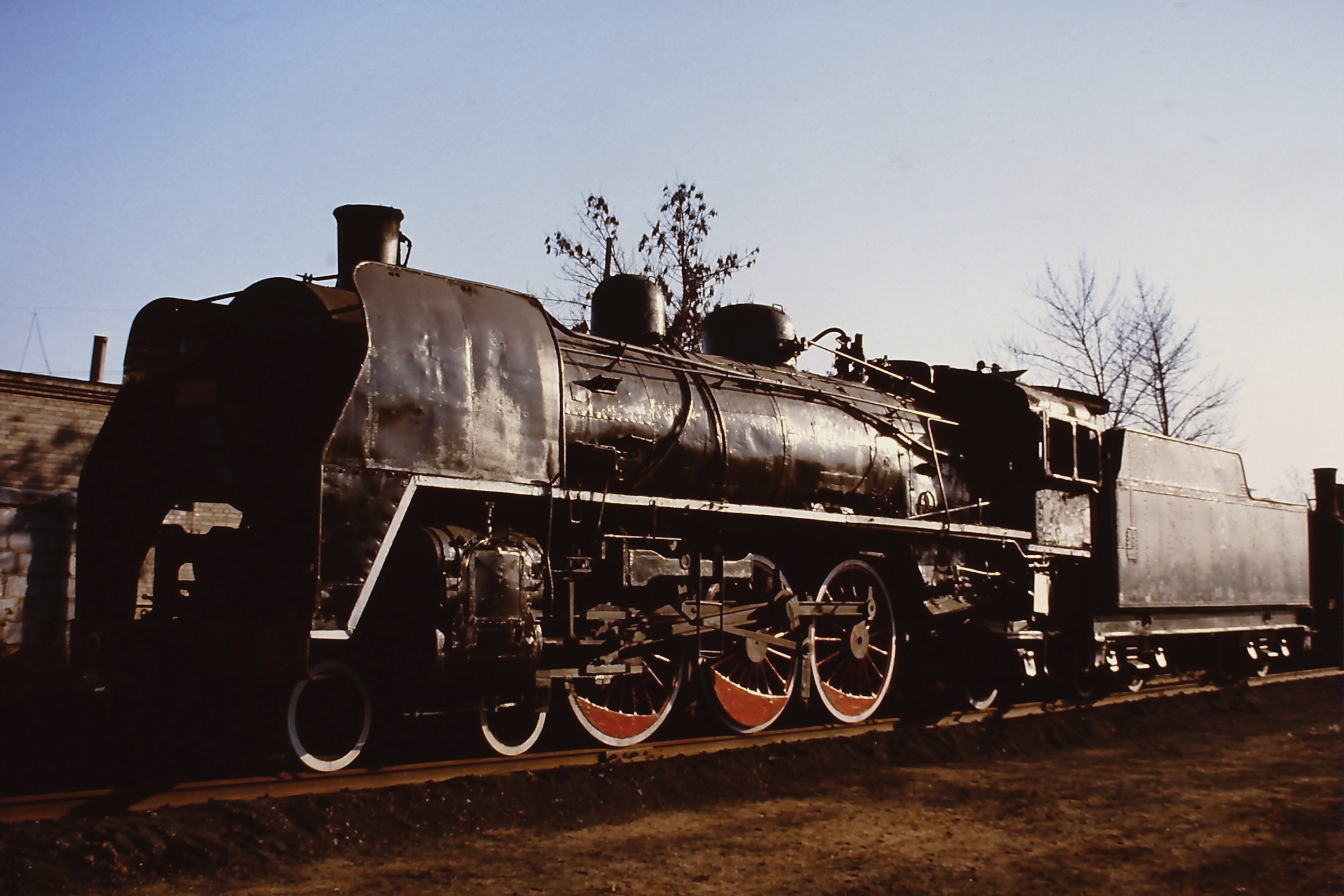
- SL5-292 at Shenyang Railway Museum
Type and origin
- Power type: Steam
- Designer: Nobutarō Yoshino (吉野信太郎)
- Builder: Shahekou Works
- Build date: 1927–1928
- Total produced: 11
Specifications
- Configuration
  - Whyte: 4-6-2
- Gauge: 1,435 mm (4 ft 8 1/2 in)
- Driver dia.: 1,850 mm (73 in)
- Adhesive weight: 63.93 t (62.92 long tons)
- Loco weight: 102.34 t (100.72 long tons)
- Fuel type: Coal
- Firebox
  - Grate area: 4.82 m^{2} (51.9 sq ft)
- Boiler pressure: 14.1 kgf/cm^{2} (201 psi)
- Cylinders: Two, outside
- Cylinder size: 584 mm × 710 mm (23.0 in × 28.0 in)
- Valve gear: Walschaerts
Career
- Operators: South Manchuria Railway; China Railway
- Class: SMR: G1 (1927–1938); CR: ㄆㄒ伍 (1951–1959); CR: 勝利5 (1959–)
- Number in class: 11
- Numbers: SMR: パシコ950–960 (1927–1938); SMR: パシコ1–11 (1938–1945)
- Preserved: SL5-292
- Disposition: 1 preserved, remainder scrapped

The China Railways SL5 (勝利5, Shènglì, "victory") steam locomotive was a class of 4-6-2 "Pacific" type passenger steam locomotives operated by the China Railway. They were originally built for the South Manchuria Railway in 1927 and 1928.

== History ==
As speeds increased and trains got heavier with the introduction of steel passenger carriages, the Pashishi class became inadequate, and the Pashiko class was ordered as a replacement. It was the first locomotive designed by Nobutarō Yoshino (吉野信太郎), who had returned to Japan in 1927 after two and a half years of studying at the American Locomotive Company, and who went on to be involved in the design of most subsequent Mantetsu locomotives. To boost the performance, cylinder size was increased and the fire grate was made larger. The Pashiko class was the first Mantetsu locomotive to be equipped with a combustion chamber firebox, and the first passenger locomotive to be fitted with an automatic stoker. With the introduction of the Pashiko class, of which eleven were built by the Shahekou Works in 1927 and 1928, the travel time of the Dalian–Changchun "Hato" express train dropped from 12 hours 30 minutes in 1929 to 10 hours 30 minutes in 1933. In 1934 they were used for high-speed tests of the "Asia Express" between Dalian and Fengtian. Until the arrival of the streamlined Pashina class, these locomotives were the most emblematic of Mantetsu passenger service.

Owner	Class & numbers (1927–1938)	Class & numbers (1938–1945)	Builder
Mantetsu	パシコ950–パシコ960	パシコ1–パシコ11	Shahekou Works

=== Postwar ===
All eleven survived the war, with five having been assigned to the Dalian Railway Bureau, and six to the Fengtian Bureau at the end of the war, and were taken over by the Republic of China Railway. In 1951, the China Railway designated them class ㄆㄒ伍 (PX5), subsequently becoming class SL5 (勝利, Shènglì, "victory") in 1959, and were numbered in the 281–300 range. They were used by CR primarily around Shenyang on passenger trains.

SL5 281-283, and 292 were noted to be in dump around Sujiatun Locomotive Depot in April 1984. SL5 296 was noted to be in service around Sujiatun Locomotive Depot in October 1980. SL5-292 is preserved at the Shenyang Railway Museum.
