= China Railways SL3 =

4-6-2 steam locomotive

China Railways SL3 (勝利3) South Manchuria Railway Pashisa class (パシサ) Manchukuo National Pashisa class (パシサ) North China Transport Pashisa class (パシサ) Korean State Railway Pasisŏ class (바시서)
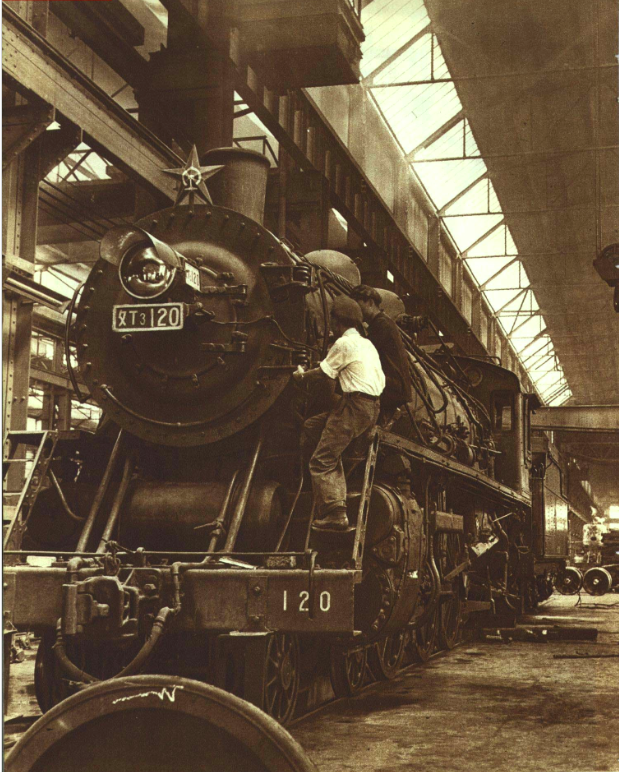
- China Railway PX3 class ㄆㄒ3 120 in October 1952
Type and origin
- Power type: Steam
- Builder: Hitachi, Kisha Seizō
- Build date: 1934–1940
- Total produced: 96
Specifications
- Configuration
  - Whyte: 4-6-2
- Gauge: 1,435 mm (4 ft 8 1/2 in)
- Fuel type: Coal
- Cylinders: Two, outside
Career
- Operators: China Railway
- Retired: 1960s
- Preserved: SL3 152
- Disposition: 1 preserved, remainder scrapped

The China Railways SL3 (勝利3, Shènglì, "victory") class steam locomotive was a class of 4-6-2 "Pacific" type steam locomotives operated by the China Railway. They were originally built for the South Manchuria Railway, the Manchukuo National Railway and the North China Transportation Company by several Japanese manufacturers between 1934 and 1940. They were designed in 1933 based on the design of the first Pashisa class locomotives (later reclassified Pashishi class); the first order was placed by Mantetsu in March of that year.

== History ==
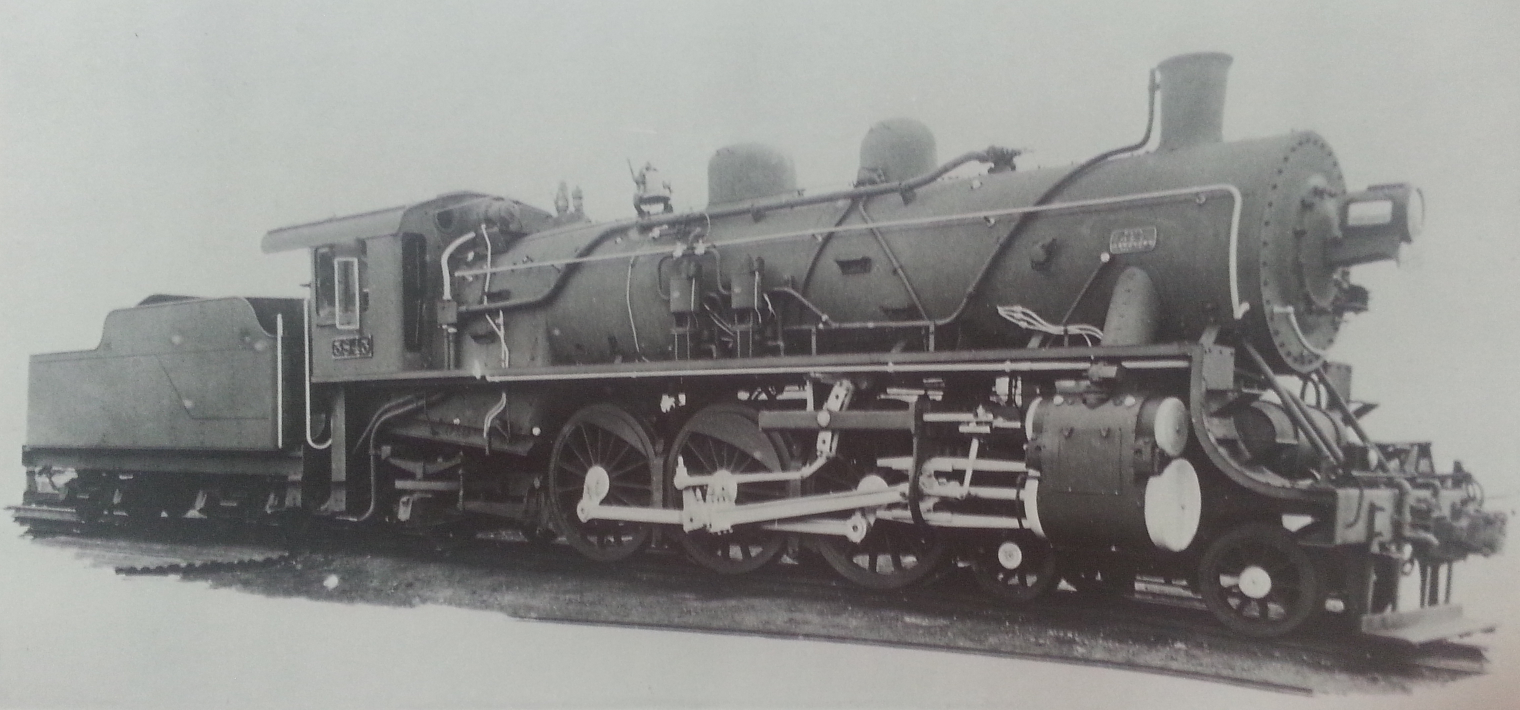
Builder's photo of Manchukuo National Railway locomotive パシシ5845

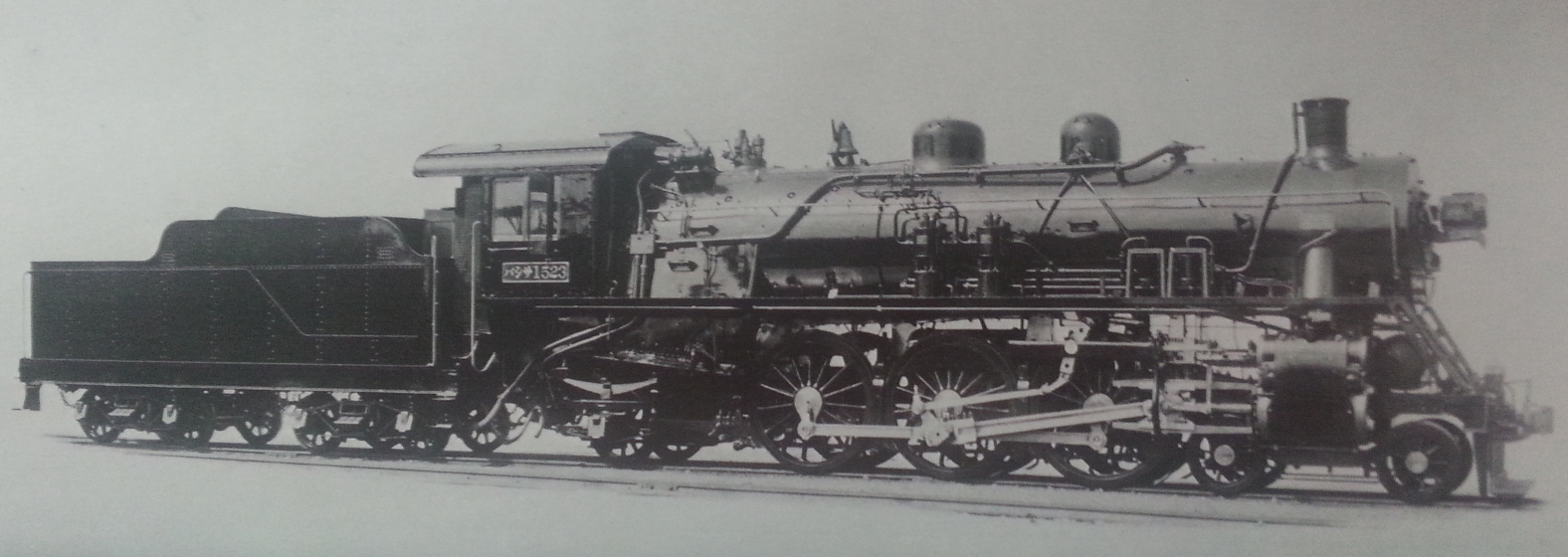
Builder's photo of North China Transport locomotive パシサ1523

After the Chosen Government Railway Bureau entrusted the management of the North Chosen Line between Cheongjin and Unggi in Korea to the South Manchuria Railway (Mantetsu), Mantetsu ordered sixteen of these locomotives, which were built in 1934 and 1935 by Hitachi and Kisha Seizō of Japan. These were designated Pashisa (パシサ) class, after the previous class of locomotives with that designation were reclassified Pashiha class in 1933. Care was taken during the design process to maximise the commonality of parts between these engines and those of the MNR Mikaro, Mantetsu Mikasa and Mantetsu Mikaro class freight locomotives.

The Mantetsu Pashisa class was identical to the Manchukuo National's Pashishi (パシシ) class, which were built to use lignite fuel. The first ten of these were built by Hitachi in 1934, these were called the "National Small Pashi" (國小パシ). After the acquisition of the Chinese Eastern Railway in March 1935 and the conversion of its mainline from Harbin to Xinjing from 1,520 mm (4 ft 11 27/32 in) Russian gauge to standard gauge, they were used to pull express trains, including the Asia Express, on that section. At the end of 1935, when the emperor of Manchukuo, Puyi, visited Harbin for the first time, his train was hauled by one of these locomotives.

The firegrate on the MNR Pashishis proved to be too small and so were increased by 0.5 m^{2} (5.4 sq ft), and at the same time, the firebox area was also enlarged by 0.4 m^{2} (4.3 sq ft). This new design, dubbed "New National Small Pashi" (新國小パシ), were 2.60 t (2.56 long tons; 2.87 short tons) heavier than the National Small Pashi, and twenty were built for the Manchukuo National in 1936 by Hitachi and Kisha Seizō.

In the unified classification scheme of 1938, the Mantetsu Pashisa and Manchukuo National Pashishi classes were combined as the Pashisa class.

Twenty were built by Hitachi in 1939 for North China Transport, numbered 1501 through 1520, followed by another 30 in 1939–1940 from Kisha Seizō, numbered 1521 through 1550.

Owner	Class & numbers (1934–1938)	Class & numbers (1938–1945)	Builder	Years Built	Notes
Mantetsu	パシサ860–パシニ875	パシサ1–パシサ16	Hitachi, Kisha Seizō	1934–1935	North Chosen Line
Manchukuo National	パシシ5830–パシシ5834	パシサ501–パシサ505	Kisha Seizō	1934	"National Small Pashi" (國小パシ)
Manchukuo National	パシシ5835–パシシ5839	パシサ506–パシサ510	Hitachi	1934	"National Small Pashi" (國小パシ)
Manchukuo National	パシシ5840–パシシ5842	パシサ511–パシサ513	Kisha Seizō	1936	"New National Small Pashi" (新國小パシ)
Manchukuo National	パシシ5843–パシシ5844	パシサ514–パシサ515	Hitachi	1936	"New National Small Pashi" (新國小パシ)
Manchukuo National	パシシ5845–パシシ5849	パシサ516–パシサ520	Kisha Seizō	1936	"New National Small Pashi" (新國小パシ)
Manchukuo National	パシシ5850–パシシ5859	パシサ521–パシサ530	Hitachi	1936	"New National Small Pashi" (新國小パシ)
North China	-	パシサ1501–パシサ1520	Hitachi	1939	"New National Small Pashi" (新國小パシ)
North China	-	パシサ1521–パシサ1550	Kisha Seizō	1939–1940	"New National Small Pashi" (新國小パシ)

== Postwar ==
=== China Railways SL3 (勝利3) ===
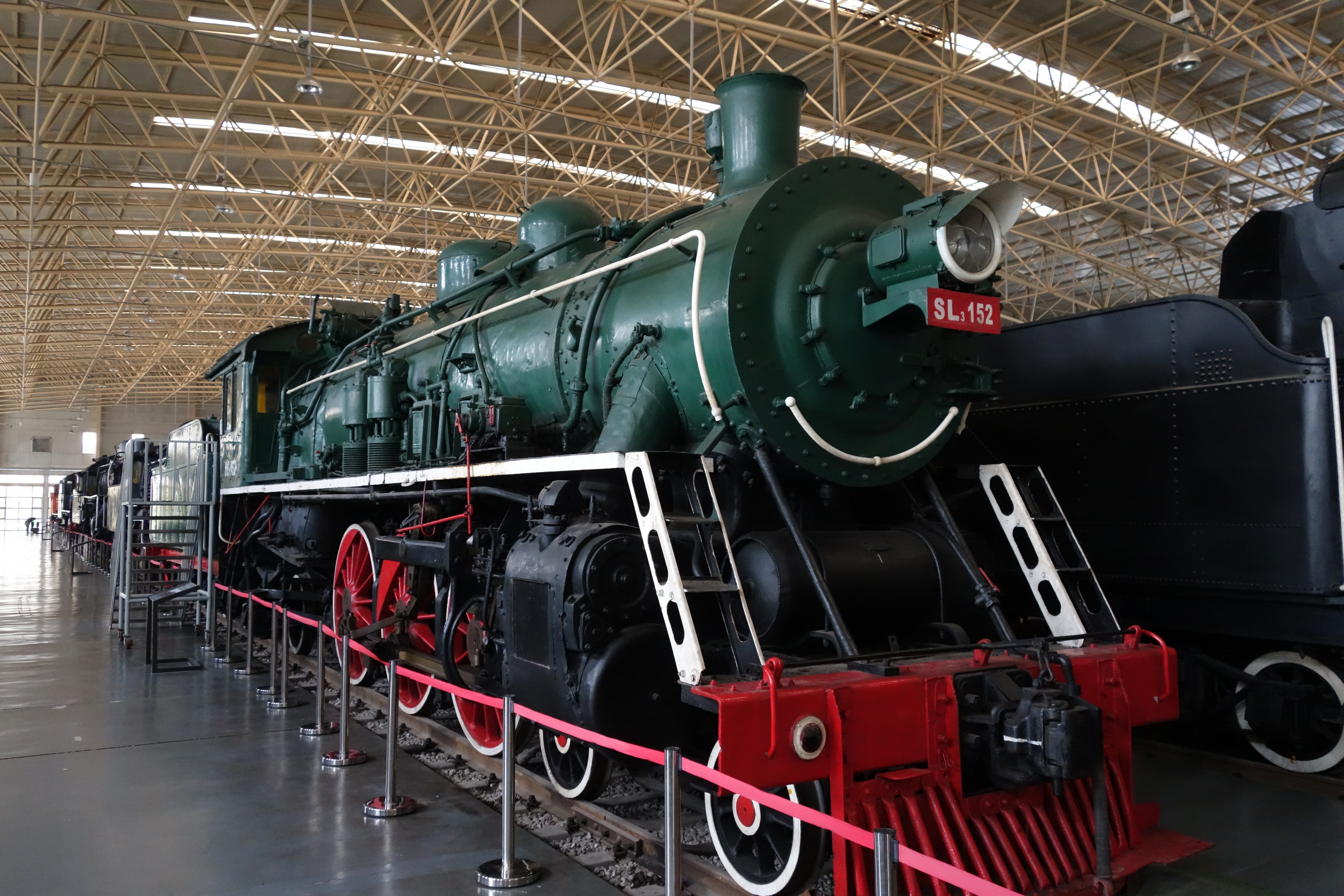
China Railways SL3-152 at the China Railway Museum

The thirty Pashisa-class locomotives belonging to the Manchukuo National were assigned to the Fengtian (1), the Jilin (5), the Mudanjiang (7), and the Qiqihar Railway Bureaus (11), and six were out on loan to other railways. These, along with the thirty belonging to North China Transport, were taken over by the Republic of China Railway. In 1951, they were classified class ㄆㄒ3 (PX3) by the China Railway, becoming class SL3 (勝利, Shènglì, "victory") in 1959; they were initially numbered in the 101–270 range (other sources say 101–188). In 1980, twelve locomotives with numbers ranging from 114 to 264 were seen in service around China, including in Shanghai, Beijing, Zhengzhou and Guangzhou. SL3 152 is preserved at the China Railway Museum in Beijing.

=== Korean State Railway 바시서 (Pasisŏ) class ===
At the end of the Pacific War, all of Mantetsu's Pashisa-class locomotives were in northern Korea: eleven were assigned to the Rajin Railway Bureau for operations on Mantetsu's North Chosen Line, whilst the remaining five were out on loan to the Chosen Government Railway (Sentetsu). These were taken over by the Korean State Railway in North Korea, where they were designated 바시서 (Pasisŏ) class (not to be confused with the Pashisa-class inherited from Sentetsu). Little is known about their service lives in North Korea, but they were likely retired by the late 1960s.

== Class Specifications ==
	Pashisa (Mantetsu)	Pashisa (MNR Small Pashi)	Pashisa (New MNR Small Pashi)
Builder	Hitachi, Kisha Seizō	Hitachi	Hitachi, Kisha Seizō
Build date	1934–1935	1934	1936–1940
Driver diameter	1,750 mm (69 in)	1,750 mm (69 in)	1,750 mm (69 in)
Length	21,498 mm (846.4 in)	21,498 mm (846.4 in)	21,498 mm (846.4 in)
Width	2,995 mm (117.9 in)	2,995 mm (117.9 in)	2,995 mm (117.9 in)
Height	4,434 mm (174.6 in)	4,434 mm (174.6 in)	4,434 mm (174.6 in)
Loco weight	89.40 t (87.99 long tons; 98.55 short tons)	91.10 t (89.66 long tons; 100.42 short tons)	91.00 t (89.56 long tons; 100.31 short tons)
Tender weight	58.48 t (57.56 long tons; 64.46 short tons)	57.52 t (56.61 long tons; 63.40 short tons)	58.48 t (57.56 long tons; 64.46 short tons)
Adhesive weight	55.60 t (54.72 long tons; 61.29 short tons)	57.70 t (56.79 long tons; 63.60 short tons)	56.00 t (55.12 long tons; 61.73 short tons)
Valve gear	Walschaerts	Walschaerts	Walschaerts
Tractive effort	123.7 kN (27,800 lb_{f})	123.7 kN (27,800 lb_{f})	123.7 kN (27,800 lb_{f})
Cylinder size	533 mm × 660 mm (21.0 in × 26.0 in)	533 mm × 660 mm (21.0 in × 26.0 in)	533 mm × 660 mm (21.0 in × 26.0 in)
Boiler pressure	14.0 kgf/cm^{2} (199 psi)	14.0 kgf/cm^{2} (199 psi)	14.0 kgf/cm^{2} (199 psi)
Firegrate area	4.07 m^{2} (43.8 sq ft)	4.07 m^{2} (43.8 sq ft)	4.57 m^{2} (49.2 sq ft)
Heating surface	220.60 m^{2} (2,374.5 sq ft)	220.60 m^{2} (2,374.5 sq ft)	221.00 m^{2} (2,378.8 sq ft)
Superheater area	44.60 m^{2} (480.1 sq ft)	44.60 m^{2} (480.1 sq ft)	44.60 m^{2} (480.1 sq ft)
Tube area	156.10 m^{2} (1,680.2 sq ft)	156.10 m^{2} (1,680.2 sq ft)	156.10 m^{2} (1,680.2 sq ft)
Firebox area	19.90 m^{2} (214.2 sq ft)	19.90 m^{2} (214.2 sq ft)	20.30 m^{2} (218.5 sq ft)
Small tubes (Number x diameter)	131 x 51 mm (2.0 in)	131 x 51 mm (2.0 in)	131 x 51 mm (2.0 in)
Large tubes (Number x diameter)	26 x 137 mm (5.4 in)	26 x 137 mm (5.4 in)	26 x 137 mm (5.4 in)
Water capacity	24.00 m^{3} (848 cu ft)	24.00 m^{3} (848 cu ft)	24.00 m^{3} (848 cu ft)
Fuel capacity	9.60 t (9.45 long tons; 10.58 short tons)	9.60 t (9.45 long tons; 10.58 short tons)	9.60 t (9.45 long tons; 10.58 short tons)
Operator	South Manchuria Railway; Korean State Railway	Manchukuo National Railway; China Railway	Manchukuo National Railway; North China Transport; China Railway
Numbers in class	16	10	70
