= China Railways SL4 =

Class of 4-6-2 passenger steam locomotives

China Railways SL4 Mantetsu Pashishi class (パシシ) Manchukuo National Pashishi class (パシシ)
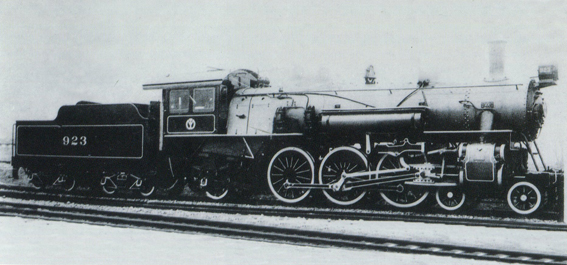
- Builder's photo of Mantetsu G3 923
Type and origin
- Power type: Steam
- Builder: G2: Baldwin; G3: Shahekou Works
- Build date: G2: 1919 (6); G3: 1921 (23)
- Total produced: 29
Specifications
- Configuration
  - Whyte: 4-6-2
- Gauge: 1,435 mm (4 ft 8 1/2 in)
- Driver dia.: 1,750 mm (69 in)
- Adhesive weight: G2: 59.33 t (58.39 long tons); G3: 59.33 t (58.39 long tons)
- Loco weight: G2: 90.63 t (89.20 long tons); G3: 95.80 t (94.29 long tons)
- Fuel type: Coal
- Firebox
  - Grate area: G2: 4.09 m^{2} (44.0 sq ft); G3: 4.67 m^{2} (50.3 sq ft)
- Boiler pressure: 14.1 kgf/cm^{2} (201 psi)
- Cylinders: Two, outside
- Cylinder size: 533 mm × 660 mm (21.0 in × 26.0 in)
- Valve gear: Walschaerts
Career
- Operators: South Manchuria Railway; Manchukuo National Railway; China Railway
- Class: SMR: G2 (1919–1920); SMR: パシサ (1920–1933); SMR: パシハ (1933–1934); SMR: パシシ (1938–1945); MNR: パシナ (1934–1938); MNR: パシシ (1938–1945); SMR: G3 (1921); SMR: パシシ (1921–1945); CR: ㄆㄒ4 (1951−1959); CR: 勝利4 (1959−)
- Number in class: 29
- Numbers: SMR: G2 900–905 (1908–1920); SMR: パシサ900–905 (1920–1933); SMR: パシハ5920–5925 (1933–1934); MNR: パシナ5920–5925 (1934–1938); MNR: パシシ501–506 (1938–1945); SMR: G3 920–942 (1921); SMR: パシシ920–942 (1921–1938); SMR: パシシ1–23 (1938–1945)
- Disposition: All scrapped

The China Railways SL4 (勝利4, Shènglì, "victory") class steam locomotive was a class of 4-6-2 "Pacific" type steam locomotives operated by the China Railway. They were originally built for South Manchuria Railway (Mantetsu), where they were designated Pashishi (パシニ) class. Mantetsu's 1938 "Pashishi" classification was made up of two distinct classes of locomotive, the former G2 and G3 classes, built in 1919 and 1921 respectively, for Mantetsu and for the Manchukuo National Railway.

== Original Class G2 ==
In anticipation of the resumption of express passenger trains after the end of the First World War, Mantetsu imported six G2 class locomotives from Baldwin of the United States in 1919. These services were resumed between Dalian and Changchun in June 1921, and between Busan, Korea and Fengtian in July 1923. Initially used for express trains on the main line, they eventually began working on the Anfeng Line as well, moving express and ordinary passenger trains between Manchuria and Korea.

Initially designated class G2, in 1920 they were reclassified as Pashisa (パシサ) class. In 1933, the entire class was redesignated as Pashiha (パシハ) class, with the Pashisa class designation given to a class of locomotives built in Japan in the following year (the second Pashisa class). In 1934, all six units were transferred to the Manchukuo National Railway, becoming MNR class Pashina (パシナ) until the introduction of the unified classification system in 1938, when they became Pashishi (パシシ) class.

| Owner | Class & numbers (pre-1920) | Class & numbers (1920–1938) | Class & numbers (1938–1945) | Builder |
|---|---|---|---|---|
| Mantetsu | G2 900–905 | パシサ900–パシサ905 (1920–1933) | - | Baldwin |
| Manchukuo National | | パシナ5920–パシナ5925 (1934–1938) | パシシ501–パシシ506 | Baldwin |

== Original Class G3 ==
Like the G2 class, the G3 class was built in anticipation of the restoration of express services after the end of the First World War. Like the Pashini class, these were built by Mantetsu's Shahekou Works, and were based on the earlier class, but with a design upgraded using new equipment imported from the United States, and had a larger tender to allow use over longer distances without needing to refuel. A total of 23 were built between 1921 and 1927. During the era of wooden passenger equipment, the G3 class became one of Mantetsu's signature locomotives, but they proved inadequate for use with express trains once heavier, all-steel passenger equipment was introduced. Replaced on those trains by the Pashiko class, the Pashishi class was relegated for use with ordinary passenger trains.

| Owner | Class & numbers (1921) | Class & numbers (1921–1938) | Class & numbers (1938–1945) | Builder |
|---|---|---|---|---|
| Mantetsu | G3 920–942 | パシシ920–パシシ942 | パシシ1–パシシ23 | Shahekou Works |

== China Railway ==
At the end of the Second World War, the 29 locomotives of the Pashisa class (both former G2 and G3 classes) survived, and were assigned to the Dalian (7), Fengtian (11), Harbin (6) and Qiqihar Railway Bureaus (5). They were taken over by the Republic of China Railway in 1945; after the establishment of the People's Republic of China, they were classified class ㄆㄒ4 (PX4) by the China Railway in 1951, becoming class SL4 (勝利, Shènglì, "victory") in 1959.

== Bibliography ==
- Whitehouse, Patrick Bruce (1988). China By Rail. London: Stanley Paul. ISBN 9780091737092 – via Internet Archive.
