= Asia Express =

Express passenger train in Manchukuo

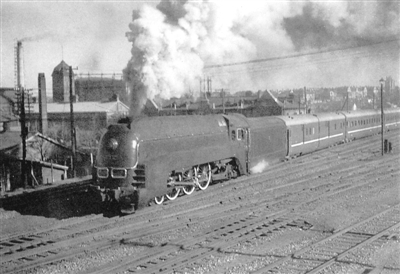
- The Asia Express

Overview
- Service type: Super express
- Status: Discontinued
- Locale: Japanese Empire - Manchukuo
- First service: November 1934
- Last service: 28 February 1943
- Former operator: South Manchuria Railway

Route
- Termini: Dalian; Harbin
- Stops: 9
- Distance travelled: 943.3 km (586.1 mi)
- Average journey time: 13 hours, 5 minutes

On-board services
- Classes: 1st, 2nd, 3rd
- Catering facilities: Dining car
- Observation facilities: Tail-end observation carriage
- Other facilities: Lounge

Technical
- Rolling stock: Pashina class locomotive; One baggage/mail carriage; Two 3rd class carriage(s); One dining car; One 2nd class carriage; One 1st class observation carriage
- Track gauge: 1,435 mm (4 ft 8 1/2 in)
- Operating speed: Max: 135 km/h (84 mph); Avg: 80 km/h (50 mph)

Asia Express

Chinese name
- Traditional Chinese: 亞細亞號
- Simplified Chinese: 亚细亚号
Transcriptions
Standard Mandarin
- Hanyu Pinyin: Yàxìyà hào

Japanese name
- Kanji: 亜細亜号
- Hiragana: あじあごう
- Katakana: アジアゴウ
Transcriptions
- Romanization: Ajia-gō

The Asia Express (Japanese: あじあ号, romanized: Ajia-gō, simplified Chinese: 亚细亚号; traditional Chinese: 亞細亞號; pinyin: Yàxìyà hào) was a super express passenger train operated by the South Manchuria Railway (Mantetsu) from 1934 until 1943. This limited express, which began operation in November 1934 and was Mantetsu's most iconic train, operated in Manchukuo between Dalian and Changchun, and was extended to Harbin in 1935.

The Asia Express featured several world firsts, such as fully enclosed, air-conditioned carriages, and was envisioned as being the first step in building a network of high-speed trains extending as far as Singapore. In addition to showcasing Japanese technology, it served as a symbol of technology and modernism in Manchukuo, and was used to demonstrate the success of Japan's imperial project. It was featured prominently on fliers, posters, and even postage stamps, and Manchukuo children's textbooks included passages about it. Reporters from the United States rode the inaugural train, complimenting it on its speed and luxurious comfort, and praised Mantetsu's efforts at developing Manchukuo.

== History ==
When Manchukuo was established in 1932, a railway line owned by the South Manchuria Railway (Mantetsu), the Renkyō Line, connected the capital, Xinjing, to the major port city of Dalian, where ferries connected to Japan; to bring service on this line up to the world standard, the Asia Express service was devised. Planning and development was carried out in a relatively short period of time between 1933 and 1934. A contest was held to name the new train, and Asia Express was selected from amongst 30,066 submitted entries.

An accident on 30 October 1938 at Taipingshan killed one crew member and seriously injured two, but there were only slight injuries amongst the passengers.

In July 1941, the Kwantung Army ordered the temporary suspension of the Asia Express due to special exercises. Service was resumed in December of the same year, but on 28 February 1943, due to Japan's deteriorating situation in the Pacific War, the Asia Express was discontinued, and the equipment was reassigned to other duties; some of the passenger carriages were converted to hospital cars. After the war, some of the passenger carriages were taken to the Soviet Union, but the locomotives and remainder of the carriages were taken over by the China Railway. Some of the locomotives and carriages are still in existence today.

== Service ==
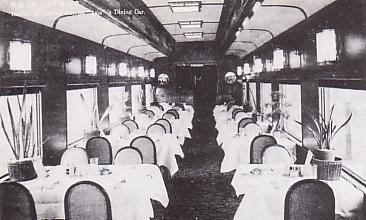
Interior of a Shi8 (シ8) type dining car.

The Asia Express was the fastest train in Asia, reaching maximum speeds of up to 120 km/h (75 mph), with an average speed of 82.5 km/h (51.3 mph) - faster than the Japanese Government Railways' limited express trains in Japan. At the time the "Asia" entered service, the fastest train in Japan, the Tsubame, had a maximum speed of 95 km/h (59 mph) and an average speed of 69.55 km/h (43.22 mph), and even after the war, the fastest trains in Japan reached only 110 km/h (68 mph) until the introduction of the Shinkansen. Travel time between Dalian and Xinjing was 8 hours 30 minutes, the service was extended from Xinjing to Harbin in September 1935, and travel time over the 943.3 km (586.1 mi) was 13 hours, an average of 72.5 km/h (45.1 mph).

The level of service on the Asia Express was high. The carriages were air conditioned and had on-board refrigerators. The dining car featured meals prepared aboard the train, and employed Russian waitresses, who, amongst their other duties, prepared the "Asia Cocktail" devised especially for the Asia Express. There were two variants of the Asia Cocktail, the Green based on vodka with peppermint liqueur added, and the Scarlet, made with Cognac and grenadine syrup.

== Rolling stock ==
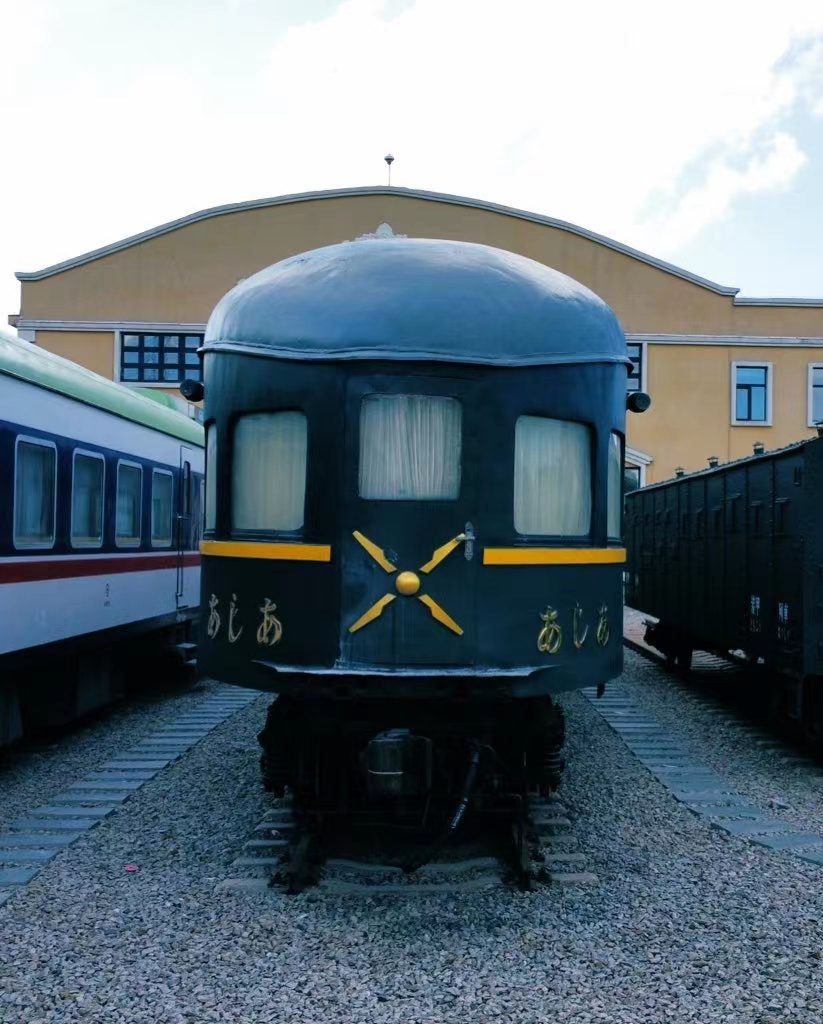
Sightseeing carriage of Asia Express

The locomotives used to haul the trains were known as the Pashina (パシナ) class. They were designed by 37-year old engineer Nobutaro Yoshino, who had also designed the Pashiko class locomotive and constructed by Kawasaki and Mantetsu's Shahekou Works in 1934 and 1936. The Kawanishi Aircraft Company provided assistance in the design of the streamlining. As the Pashina class was too heavy for use on the line north of Xinjing, the Asia Express was hauled by Pashiro class locomotives between Xinjing and Harbin.

The consist was made up of lightweight, streamlined passenger carriages designed expressly for use with this train and built at the Shahekou Works. Trains were generally made up of six carriages - following the locomotive, one Teyu8 (テユ8) type baggage/mail car, two Ha8 (ハ8) type third-class coaches, one Shi8 (シ8) type dining car, one Ro8 (ロ8) type second-class coach, and one Ten'i8 (テンイ8) type first class observation carriage. Occasionally, longer trains were run, adding equipment such as an I8 (イ8) type first-class coaches or an additional Ha8 coach as required. In order to minimise weight, these carriages made extensive use of aluminium and magnesium fittings, and the semi-monocoque bodies were made using sheet steel of high tensile strength imported from Germany.

These carriages featured sealed windows and were fitted with skirts to reduce wind resistance, and they were welded instead of riveted, further reducing their weight, and they rode on 3-axle roller bearing bogies. All the carriages, with the exception of the baggage/postal car, were also equipped with air-conditioners copied from one unit imported from Carrier in the United States. Although the issues were eventually solved, the air conditioners were initially problematic, with one newspaper commenting that the heat in the train in the summer was "more like Africa than Asia". Mantetsu achieved a world first through the use of lightweight, streamlined, air-conditioned carriages with sealed windows on the Asia Express - it wasn't until 1938 that such cars entered service in the United States, on the New York Central's 20th Century Limited and the Pennsylvania Railroad's Broadway Limited express trains; although the Baltimore and Ohio Railroad's Columbian was the first in the world to use air conditioned stock from 24 May 1931, followed by the B&O's Capitol Limited and the Chesapeake and Ohio Railway's George Washington in 1932, these earlier trains used refurbished, heavyweight cars. In addition to the air-conditioning, the luxurious carriages featured on-board refrigerators, and the observation carriage contained a salon complete with leather chairs and bookshelves.

== Recognition and legacy ==
The popularity and name-recognition of the Asia Express was very high in Manchukuo and Japan, being one of the most recognisable symbols of Manchukuo and Mantetsu in the 1930s and early 1940s, and remains symbolic of the region and the time period to this day. In addition to a wide array of books and magazine articles written about Mantetsu in general and the Asia Express in particular, it is frequently mentioned in books about Manchukuo, and is often referenced in fiction, in both prose and manga; there are entire novels set aboard the train.

The Asia Express remains in Japanese consciousness even now, with items as diverse as USB memory sticks and Zippo lighters bearing its image being marketed. It has also been featured in video and DVDs, both those specifically about the railway and the train itself, and those more generally about the area or history, as well as in movies and anime. Models of the train have also been sold in both HO (by Katsumi) and N scales (by MicroAce).

== Gallery ==
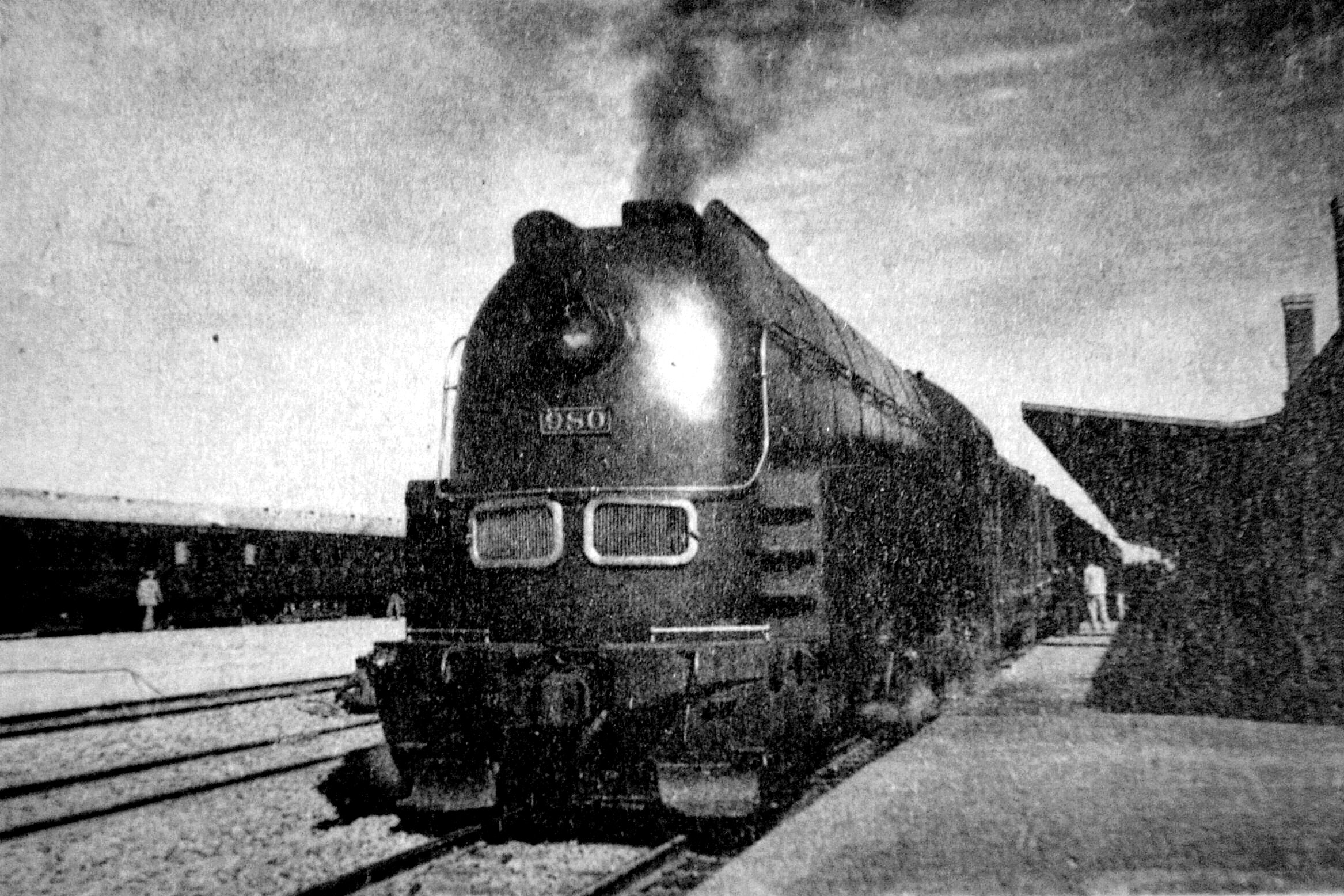
Asia Express engine

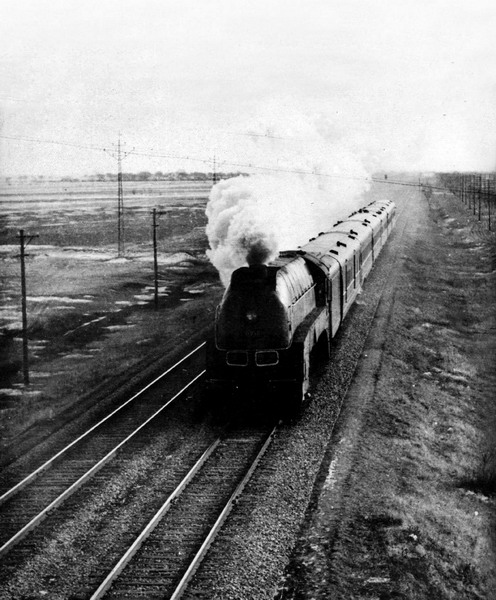
Asia Express

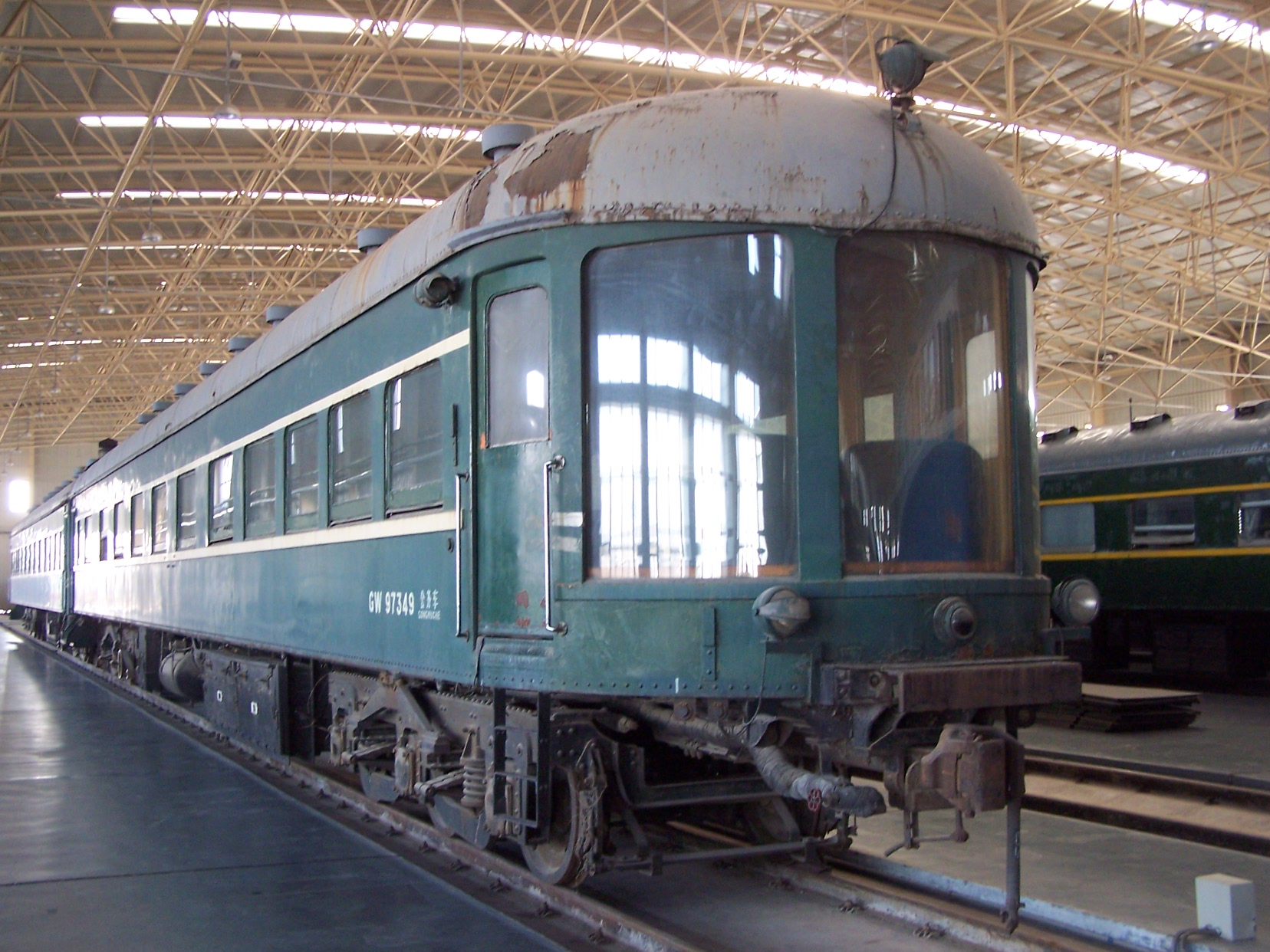
A Ten'ine2 type observation carriage on display in the China Railway Museum. This design was used on the Tairiku express train (Busan–Beijing), but is similar to the Ten'i8 type observation carriage used on the Asia Express. The primary difference is the shape of the observation window.

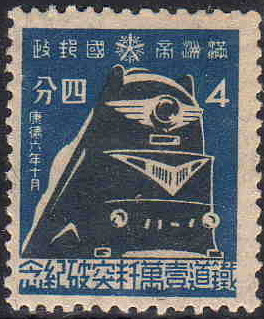
Manchukuo postage stamp featuring the locomotive パシナ981

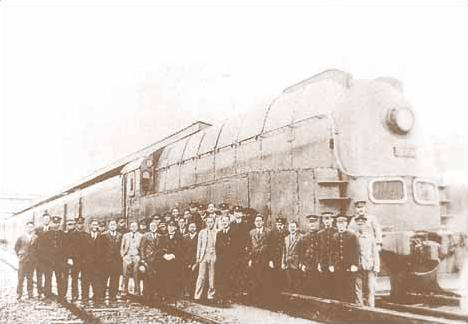
Mantetsu Pashina class locomotive パシナ973 at its trial run

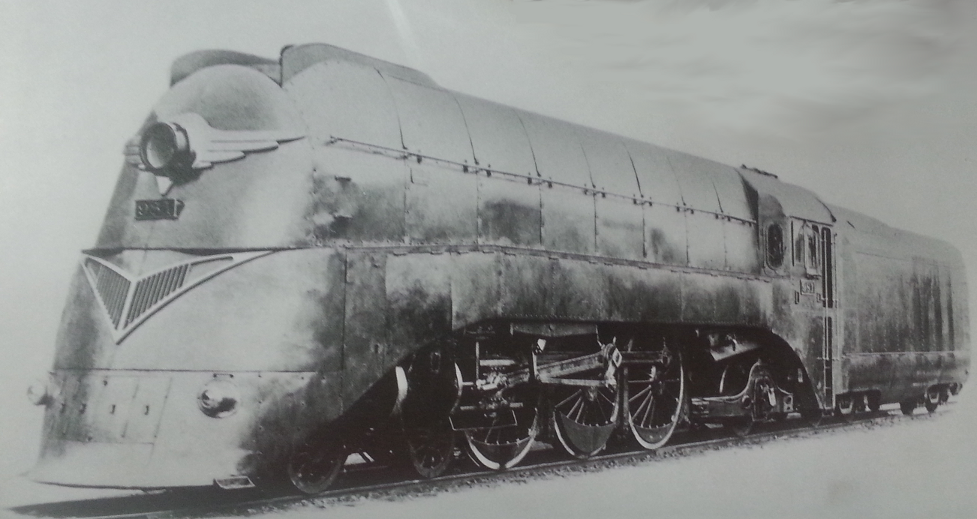
Mantetsu Pashina class locomotive パシナ981

== See also ==
- Harbin-Dalian high-speed railway
