= China Railways SL7 =

Class of 4-6-2 passenger steam locomotives

China Railways SL7 (勝利7) Mantetsu Pashina class (パシナ)
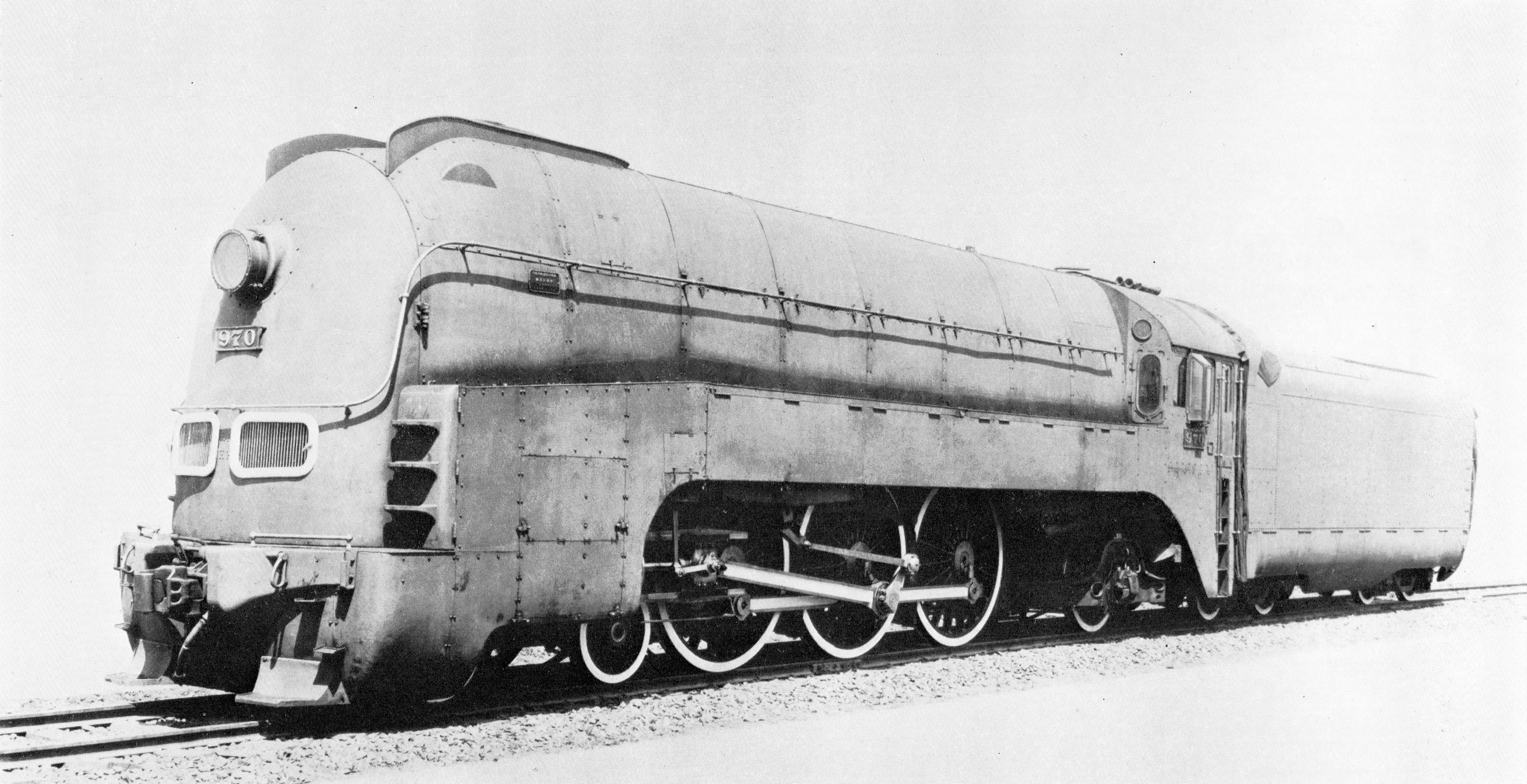
- Official builder's photo of Pashina 970.
Type and origin
- Power type: Steam
- Designer: Nobutarō Yoshino (吉野信太郎)
- Builder: Mantetsu Shahekou Works; Kawasaki
- Build date: 1934 (11), 1936 (1)
- Total produced: 12
Specifications
- Configuration
  - Whyte: 4-6-2
  - UIC: 2′C1′
- Gauge: 1,435 mm (4 ft 8 1/2 in)
- Driver dia.: 2,000 mm (79 in)
- Length: 25,675 mm (1,010.8 in)
- Width: 3,201 mm (126.0 in)
- Height: 4,800 mm (190 in)
- Adhesive weight: 71.83 t (70.70 long tons)
- Loco weight: 119.20 t (117.32 long tons)
- Tender weight: 84.11 t (82.78 long tons)
- Fuel type: Coal
- Water cap.: 37.00 m^{3} (1,307 cu ft)
- Tender cap.: 15.00 t (14.76 long tons)
- Firebox
  - Grate area: 6.25 m^{2} (67.3 sq ft)
- Boiler
  - Small tubes: 70 x 51 mm (2.0 in)
  - Large tubes: 90 x 132 mm (5.2 in)
- Boiler pressure: 15.5 kgf/cm^{2} (220 psi)
- Heating surface
  - Firebox: 29.29 m^{2} (315.3 sq ft)
  - Tubes: 248.15 m^{2} (2,671.1 sq ft)
  - Total surface: 379.64 m^{2} (4,086.4 sq ft)
- Superheater
  - Type: Schmidt type E
  - Heating area: 102.20 m^{2} (1,100.1 sq ft)
- Cylinders: Two, outside
- Cylinder size: 610 mm × 710 mm (24 in × 28 in)
- Valve gear: Walschaerts
Performance figures
- Maximum speed: 140 km/h (87 mph)
- Tractive effort: 155.4 kN (34,900 lb_{f})
Career
- Operators: South Manchuria Railway; China Railway
- Class: SMR: パシナ; CR: ㄆㄒ7 (1951–1959); CR: 勝利7 (1959–end)
- Number in class: 12
- Numbers: SMR: 970–981 (1933–1938); SMR: パシナ1–12 (1938–1945); CR: in 751-770 series
- Preserved: 751 & 757
- Current owner: China Railway Museum
- Disposition: Two preserved, remainder scrapped

The China Railways SL7 (Chinese: 勝利7; pinyin: Shènglì; lit. 'victory') was a class of 4-6-2 "Pacific" type steam locomotives operated by the China Railway. They were originally built for the South Manchuria Railway (Mantetsu) to pull the Asia Express - Mantetsu's signature train and most iconic locomotive, whose images were used on fliers, posters, postage stamps, and even children's school textbooks, as a symbol of technology and modernism in Manchukuo and was used to demonstrate the success of Japan's imperial project.

== History ==
After designing his first locomotive, the Pashiko class, at age 37 Nobutarō Yoshino (吉野信太郎), who had studied at the American Locomotive Company for two and a half years and, as the young star of Mantetsu's engineering division, nicknamed "King of Locomotives", designed the streamlined Pashina class was built with the specific purpose of hauling the long-distance, high-speed Asia Express limited express train between Dalian and Xinjing (Changchun), at speeds up to 120 km/h (75 mph). It was one of the world's first steam locomotives to be fully streamlined, which reduced air resistance by 30%, and they were painted a distinctive Prussian blue colour. Design and manufacture of the Pashina class took only seven months, using a novel process of simultaneous design and manufacture.

They were the first Mantetsu locomotives to be fitted with the Schmidt type E superheater, and were also equipped with a combustion chamber firebox, a feedwater heater, and an automatic stoker; the stoker was deemed essential, as it was calculated that human power could not supply the necessary quantities of coal fast enough. The tender bogies were fitted with Timken roller bearings. A Pashina class locomotive was used to pull Prince Chichibu's train when he visited Manchukuo in 1940. Following the suspension of the Asia Express in February 1943, they were used on ordinary express trains.

The first three were built by Mantetsu's Shahekou Works in 1934, with the next eight coming from Kawasaki in Japan, with パシナ979 (later パシナ10), completed on 21 October 1934, being the 1,500th steam locomotive to be built by Kawasaki. After experiments in the Kawanishi Aircraft Company's wind tunnel, the shape of the streamlining was redesigned, and the final unit, number 981 (later パシナ12) was built with the new design by Kawasaki in 1936.

Originally numbered パシナ970 through パシナ981, they were renumbered パシナ1–パシナ12 in Mantetsu's 1938 general renumbering.

| Owner | Class & numbers (1933–1938) | Class & numbers (1938–1945) | Builder |
|---|---|---|---|
| Mantetsu | パシナ970–972 | パシナ1–パシナ3 | Shahekou Works |
| Mantetsu | パシナ973–980 | パシナ4–パシナ11 | Kawasaki |
| Mantetsu | パシナ981 | パシナ12 | Kawasaki |

== Postwar ==
All twelve survived the Pacific War and at the end of the war were assigned to the Dalian depot, and were subsequently taken over by the Republic of China Railway. After the establishment of the People's Republic and the current China Railway, they were designated class ㄆㄒ7 (PX7) in 1951, becoming class SL7 (勝利, Shènglì, "victory") in 1959; they were numbered within the 751–770 range. They remained in use on the Shenda Line between Dalian and Shenyang into the 1980s. Several locomotives were converted to a standard type because the cover of the locomotives are obstructive to inspect.

SL7 751 was restored to fully working condition in 1984, and is displayed at the Shenyang Railway Museum. In 2001, the restoration of SL7 757 was completed in Dalian, and it has been on display at the Shenyang Railway Museum since 2013.

== Gallery ==
Pashina and SL7 Locomotives
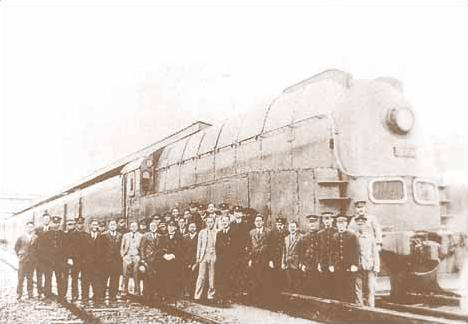
Mantetsu パシナ973 at delivery in 1934

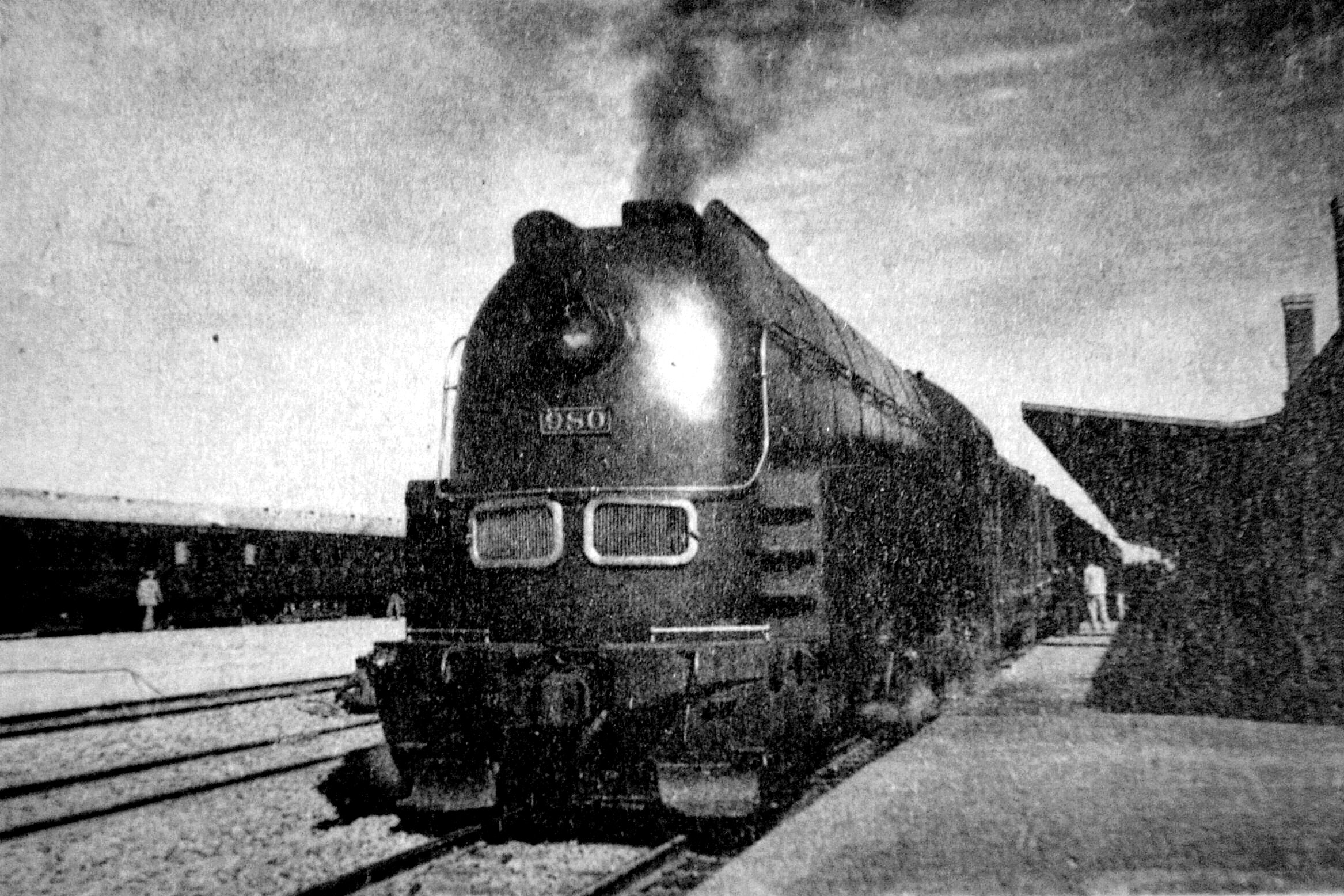
パシナ980 pulling the "Asia Express"

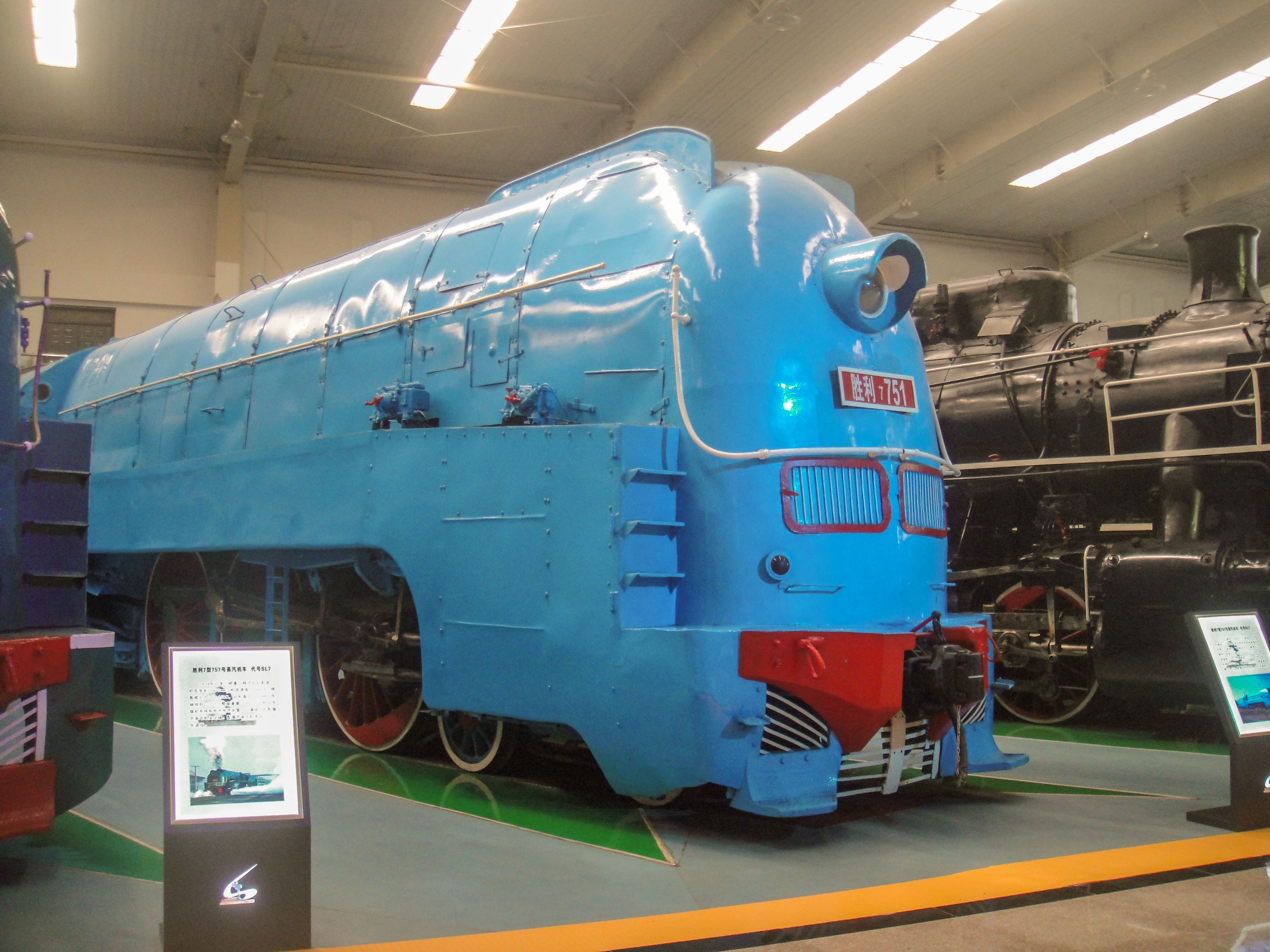
China Railways SL7-751 at the Shenyang Railway Museum

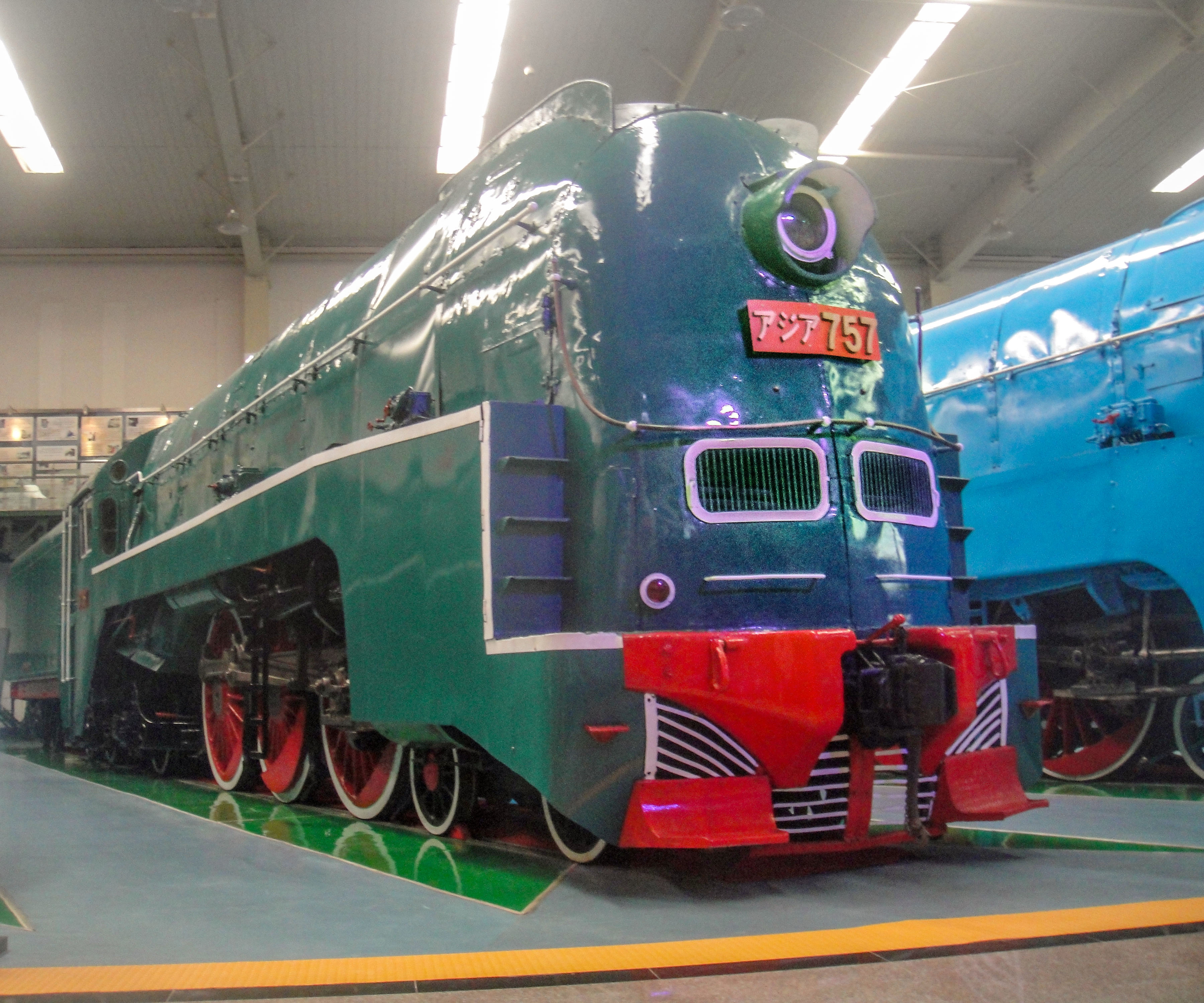
China Railways SL7-757 at the Shenyang Railway Museum

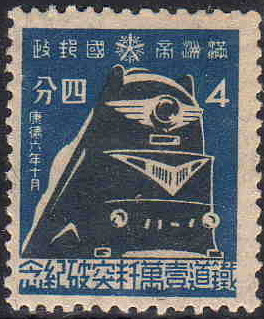
Manchukuo postage stamp featuring パシナ981
