= Shenyang Railway Museum =

Railway museum in Shenyang

Shenyang Railway Museum 沈阳铁路陈列馆
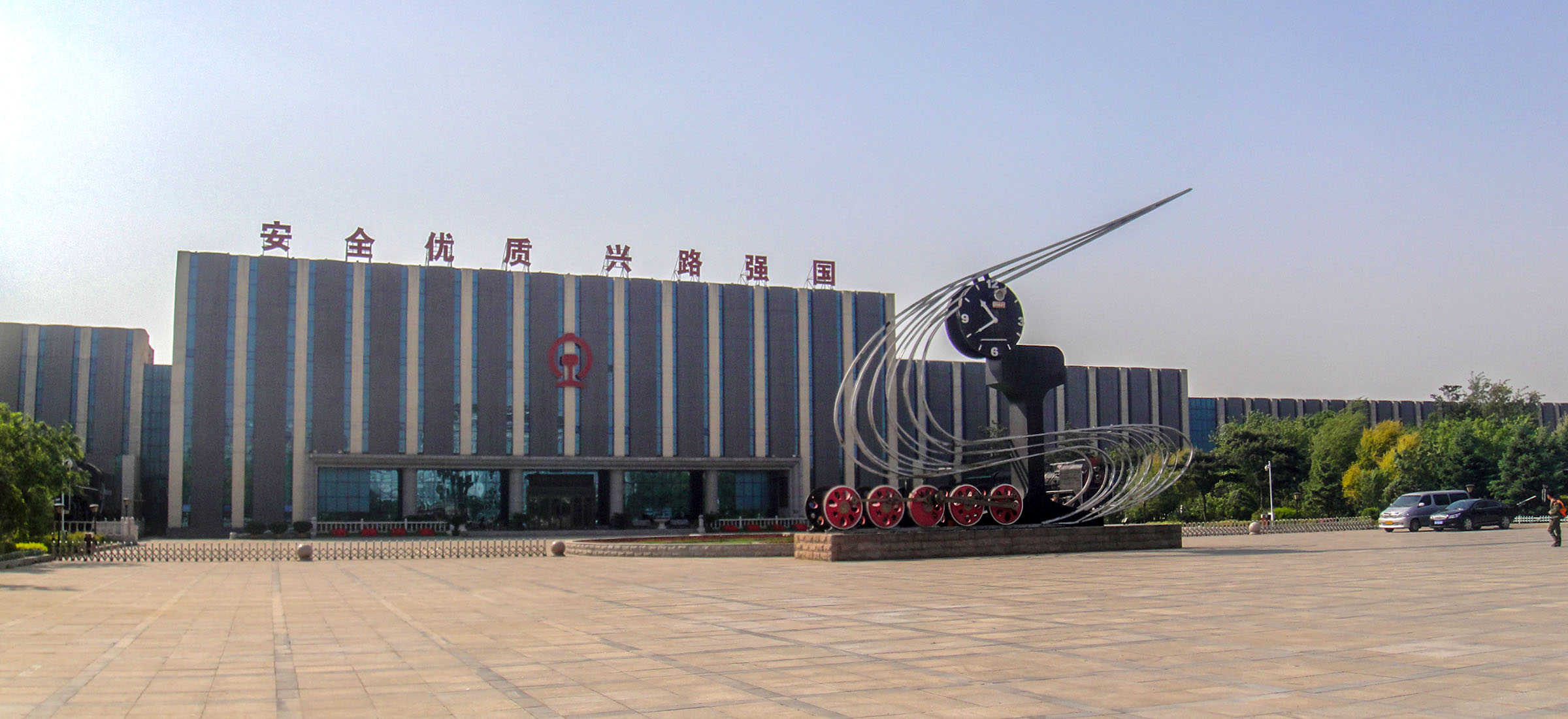
- Shenyang Railway Museum in 2017
- Former name: Shenyang Railway Steam Locomotive Exhibition Hall; Shenyang Steam Locomotive Museum
- Established: 22 September 1984
- Location: Shenyang, China
- Coordinates: 41.68°N 123.355°E
- Type: Railway museum
- Website: http://www.sytlj.com/wszg/expo

The Shenyang Railway Museum (Chinese: 沈阳铁路陈列馆; pinyin: Shěnyáng tiělù chénliè guǎn) is railway museum located at No. 8 Shandan Street, Sujiatun District, Shenyang, Liaoning Province, China, on the north side of the Sujiatun Locomotive Depot of the Shenyang Railway Bureau. The museum covers an area of 80,000 square meters and a building area of 19,000 square meters. It is the largest railway museum in Northeast China. Through more than 800 exhibits including dozens of railway locomotives and vehicles and more than 1,500 historical pictures, it shows the railway development process in Northeast China over the past 100 years.
