= CRRC Dalian =

Chinese railway rolling stock manufacturing company

Coordinates: 38.9190°N 121.5776°E

CRRC Dalian Co., Ltd.
- Native name: 中车大连机车车辆有限公司
- Formerly: Shahekou factory; Dalian Locomotive Works; CNR Dalian Locomotive & Rolling Stock Co., Ltd.
- Type: Subsidiary
- Industry: Manufacturing
- Founded: 1899; 127 years ago; 2003 (incorporation as company)
- Headquarters: Shahekou District, Dalian, Liaoning, China
- Area served: China; exported worldwide
- Products: Diesel locomotives; electric locomotives; electric multiple units; diesel engines; Light Rail Vehicles
- Owner: CRRC (100%)
- Number of employees: ~8000
- Parent: CRRC
- Website: crrcgc.cc/dlen

CRRC Dalian Co., Ltd. (Chinese: 中车大连机车车辆有限公司; lit. 'CRRC Dalian Locomotive & Rolling Stock Co.', 'Ltd.'), often abbreviated as DLoco, is a company located in Dalian, Liaoning Province, China, producing railway locomotives, multiple units and diesel engines.

The factory was established in 1899 during the period of construction of the Chinese Eastern Railway, as the Shahekou works, and was under Japanese control from 1905, and later part of the Manchukuo state. After the end of the Second World War the railway was under joint Chinese and Russian control until the 1950s when the Chinese Eastern Railroad and the city of Dalian were transferred to sole Chinese control. The factory was state owned, and controlled by the Ministry of Railways until 2001 when LORIC (China National Railway Locomotive & Rolling Stock Industry Corporation) was split into two groups (as part of CNR Group); it then became one of the constituent companies of listed company China CNR, and after June 1, 2015, CRRC, an unification of two listed companies that derived from 2001 split.

== History ==
=== 1899–1952 ===
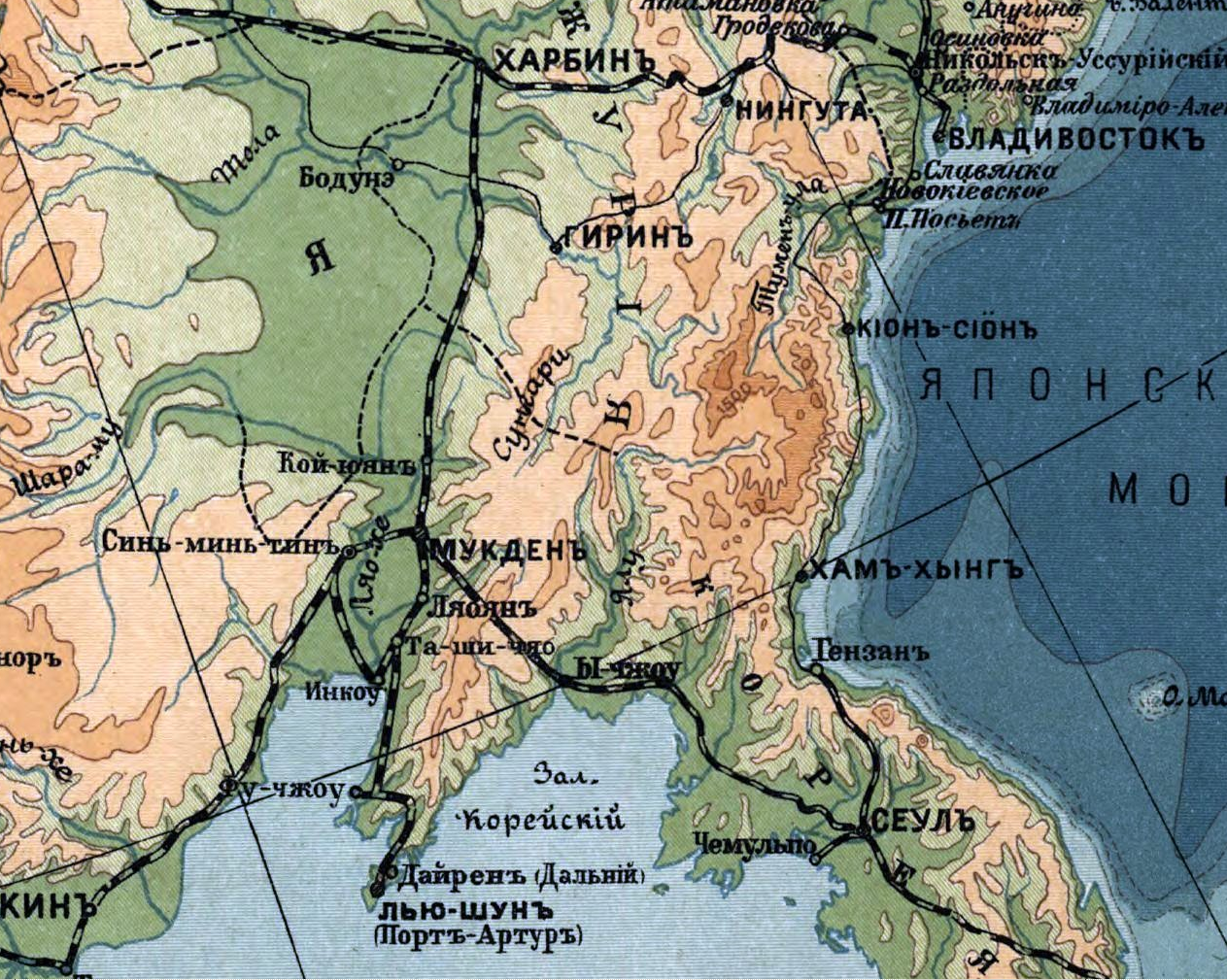
Dalian in relation to the South Manchurian branch (NE-SW) of the Chinese Eastern Railway (map draw in 1912).

The locomotive factory in Dalian was founded in 1899, contemporary with the construction of the southern branch of the Chinese Eastern Railway during the lease of the Liaodong Peninsula from China to the Russian Empire, (Note: The lease and railway construction rights were obtained in the Li–Lobanov Treaty of 1896) and to the development of Dalian as a port and town.

In 1905, the "Shahekou Plant" came under Japanese control as a result of the Treaty of Portsmouth, (Note: Treaty of Portsmouth, Article VI : "The Imperial Russian Government engages to transfer and assign to the Imperial Government of Japan, without compensation and with the consent of the Chinese Government, the railway between Chang-chunfu and Kuanchangtsu and Port Arthur, and all the branches, together with all the rights, privileges and properties appertaining thereto in that region ..") and in 1906 the railway from Dalian to Changchun became part of the Japanese controlled South Manchurian Railway.

In 1934 the factory together with Kawasaki Heavy Industries, manufactured the Asia Express high speed steam train for the South Manchuria Railway.

In 1945 at the end of the Second World War the city came under Soviet Russian control. The Changchun Railway was jointly operated by China and Russia until 1952, when control was passed entirely to the Chinese government. The Soviet administration of Dalian ended in 1950, however the USSR continued to station troops there until 1955.

=== 1952–2000 ===
In 1956 the company manufactured the China Railways HP (Note: abbreviation of Heping (Chinese: 和平; pinyin: Hé Píng; lit. 'Peace')) prototype 2–10–2 steam locomotive, and in 1957, the first China Railways JS class 2–8–2 locomotive, (Note: abbreviation of Jianshe (Chinese: 建设; pinyin: Jiàn Shè; lit. 'Construction')) of which 1916 were built at different plants. as well as other steam locomotives.

Diesel locomotives were developed and produced at the plant, a prototype diesel electric type "JuLong" (Chinese: 巨龙; pinyin: Jù Lóng; lit. 'grand dragon') was produced in 1958 based on the Russian ТЭ10 locomotive and Fairbanks-Morse FM38D opposed piston engine, which led to the DF class diesel electric locomotives (Note: abbreviation of Dongfeng (Chinese: 东风; pinyin: Dōng Fēng; lit. 'East Wind')) entered production in 1964.

The change from steam to diesel production began in 1965, and in 1969, the first of the China Railways DF4 class of locomotives was produced. The DF4 series of locomotive type became the main mainline diesel locomotive type in China, and developments were produced in the following decades; including the DF4B in 1984, the DF4D in 1996.

In the 1980s the company began a decade long research partnership with Ricardo plc into increasing the power output and efficiency of its DL240 diesel engine products. In 1997 it began working with Southwest Research Institute (USA) on the design of a new locomotive diesel engine.

The company first exported a mainline diesel locomotive in 1993 (to Myanmar), by the middle of the first decade of the 21st century the company had exported over 200 diesel locomotives.

By 2000 the company was producing half of China's internal supply of diesel locomotives, and manufactured 80% of the countries diesel locomotive exports.

=== 2000–present ===
Dalian locomotive works' parent company, state-owned China National Railway Locomotive & Rolling Stock Industry Corporation (LORIC), was split into the northern and southern groups in 2002; the locomotive works part of China Northern Locomotive & Rolling Stock Industry (Group) Corporation along with other rail vehicle manufacturers in China. The locomotive works was also incorporated as a limited company in 2003, known as CNR Group Dalian Locomotive & Rolling Stock (Chinese: 中国北车集团大连机车车辆有限公司) or just CNR Dalian.

In the first decade of the 21st century the plant began producing two new mainline locomotive product types; the China Railways HXD3 electric locomotives in association with Toshiba, a joint venture with Toshiba (Chinese: 大连东芝机车电气设备有限公司; lit. 'Dalian Toshiba Locomotive Electric Equipment Co.', 'Ltd.') was formed in 2002 to manufacture electric equipment for rolling stock. Also in the 2000s the diesel electric locomotives China Railways HXN3 were produced at Dalian in association with GM EMD.

As part of the initial public offering, the stake of CRN Dalian was transferred to an intermediate holding company China CNR in 2008.

In 2009 the company obtained its first export order to supply locomotives to a western country, an order for 20 New Zealand DL class locomotives.

In 2009 the groundbreaking ceremony took place for a new plant in the Lüshun economic development zone (Lushunkou District); the new facility was developed in conjunction with the municipal council of Dalian city. The facility, on a 2 km (1.2 mi) site, is designed to have a production of around 1000 locomotives, 1000 rail vehicles and 1000 diesel engines per year. The plant officially opened in August 2011, the first vehicles on the production line were metro passenger units for Line 2, Tianjin Metro.

In 2015, they delivered the prototype of the 8MLB light rail vehicle to Manila as part of the MRT Line 3 capacity expansion project. Being the first light rail vehicles made by the company, these faced several controversies, including weight and compatibility issues, as well as contractual restrictions involving the Department of Transportation (DOTr) and Sumitomo Corporation-Mitsubishi Heavy Industries-TES Philippines (TESP) consortium overseeing the line's rehabilitation. After 10 years of storage, and following technical audits by TÜV Rheinland and final safety checks by Sumitomo, the 8MLB LRVs officially entered regular revenue service on July 16, 2025.

One of the company's latest export orders came in January 2015 from the Lagos Metropolitan Area Transport Authority for 15 metro trains for the Lagos Rail Mass Transit system in Nigeria, with an option for 14 more. This order came about following a failed acquisition of old H-series carriages retired from the Toronto Subway. In the same year an order was placed for 14 eight car trains for Blue Line of the Kolkata Metro.

== Products and services ==
The company's primary products are railway rolling stock and related parts; it has a production capacity of ~600 locomotives and 300 metro rail vehicles per year.

- CKD8
- 8MLB LRV

== Sister companies and organizations ==
Sharing the same registered address in the Shahekou District, CRRC Dalian Dali Railway Transportation Equipment Co., Ltd. (Chinese: 大连大力轨道交通装备有限公司) was found in 2007. The company was not listed and remained in the unlisted portion of CRRC Group.

Another company, "Daqi company" or "Dalian Qiqihar Railway Rolling Stock Railway Transportation Equipment Co., Ltd." (Chinese: 大连齐车轨道交通装备有限责任公司) by CRRC Qiqihar Railway Rolling Stock in 2007. The company was based in Lüshun Economic Development Zone of Lüshunkou District. In 2016 it was renamed to Chinese: 大连中车大齐车辆有限公司; lit. 'Dalian CRRC Daqi Railway Rolling Stock'. It was part of CRRC (via CRRC Qiqihar Railway Rolling Stock), the listed portion of CRRC Group.

=== Research, development and education ===
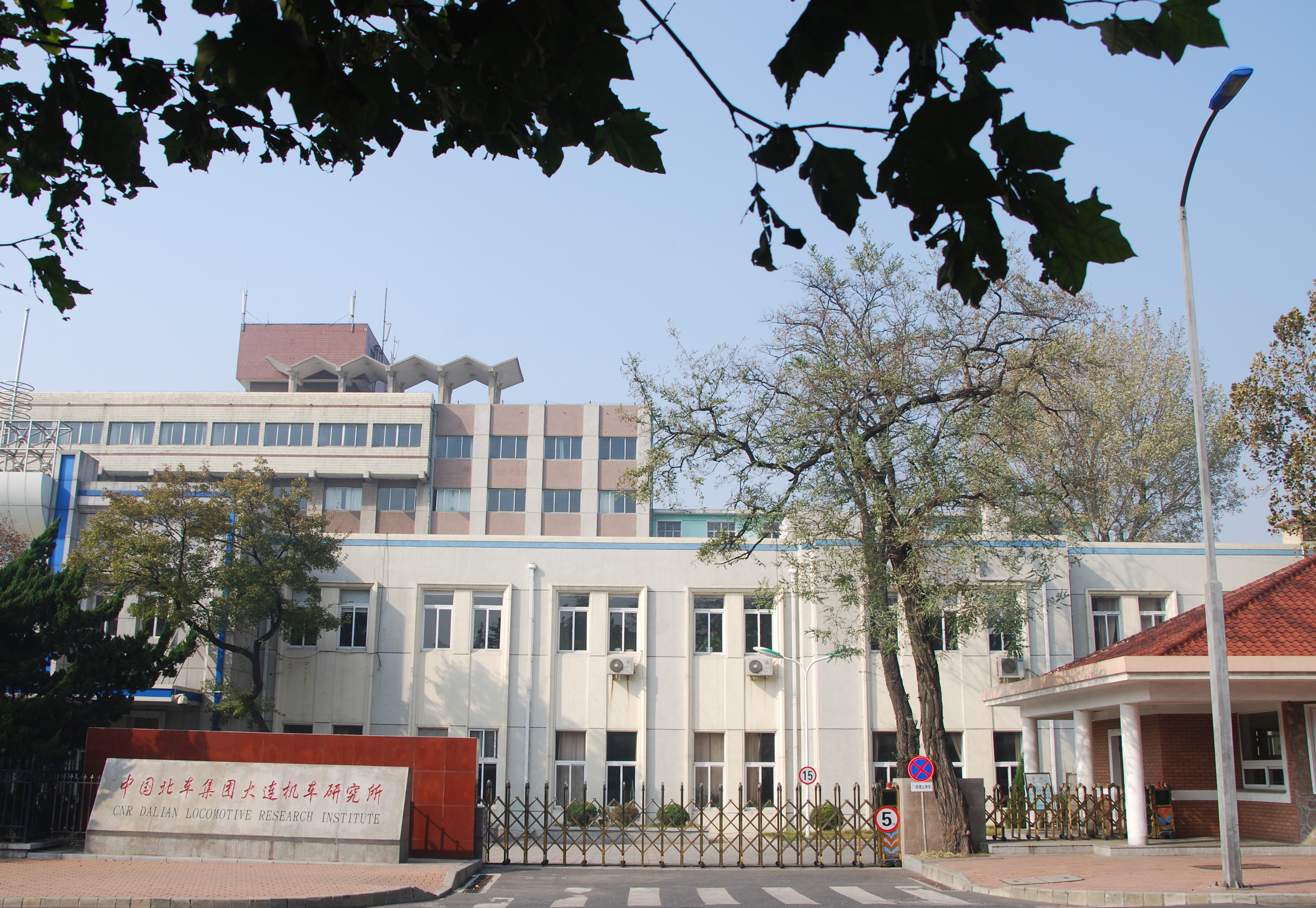
The Entrance to CRRC Dalian Research Institute on Zhongchang Street, Dalian.

In 1956, Dalian Locomotive and Rolling Stock Manufacturing School was established nearby on Huanghe Road, which became the Dalian Railway Institute (Chinese: 大连铁道学院) in 1958, and in 2004 Dalian Jiaotong University (Chinese: 大连交通大学).

Also located in Dalian, CRRC Dalian Locomotive Research Institute Co., Ltd. (Chinese: 中车大连机车研究所有限公司) was founded in 1922 by South Manchuria Railway Company as a closely associated institute of the railway and the locomotive works; the organisation was incorporated as a company and as a subsidiary of China CNR in 2007.

In 2001, another research institute, CRRC Dalian R&D (Chinese: 中车大连电力牵引研发中心), was founded. It was incorporated as a company in 2013.

== Gallery ==
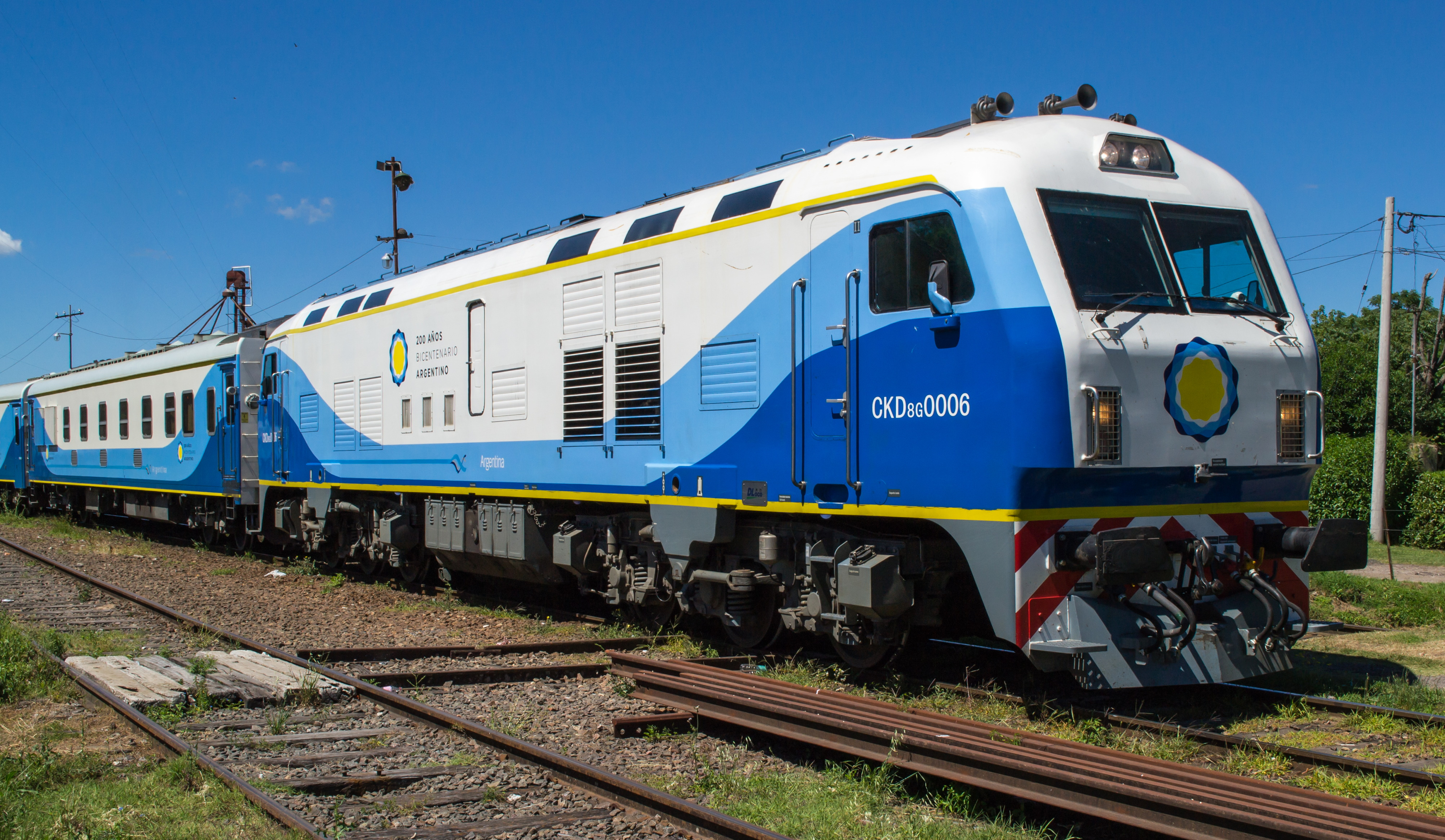
A CKD8 diesel-electric locomotive operating in Argentina for Trenes Argentinos.

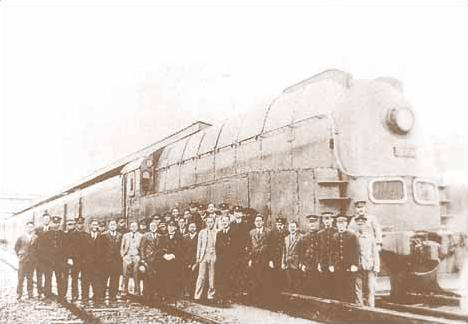
Pashina-class locomotive for Asia Express; trial run in year 1934.

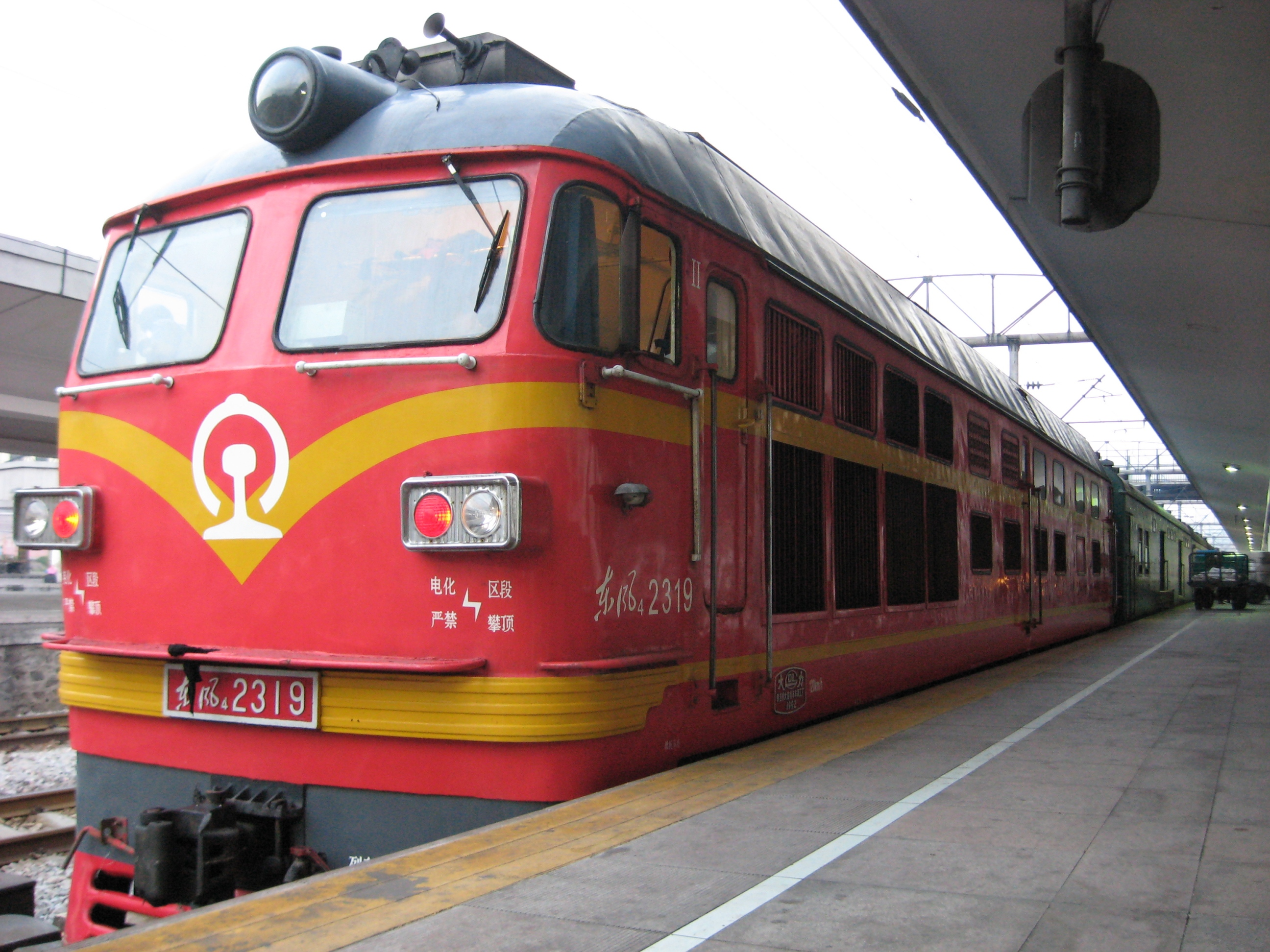
A DF4B Diesel Locomotive, serial number 2319.

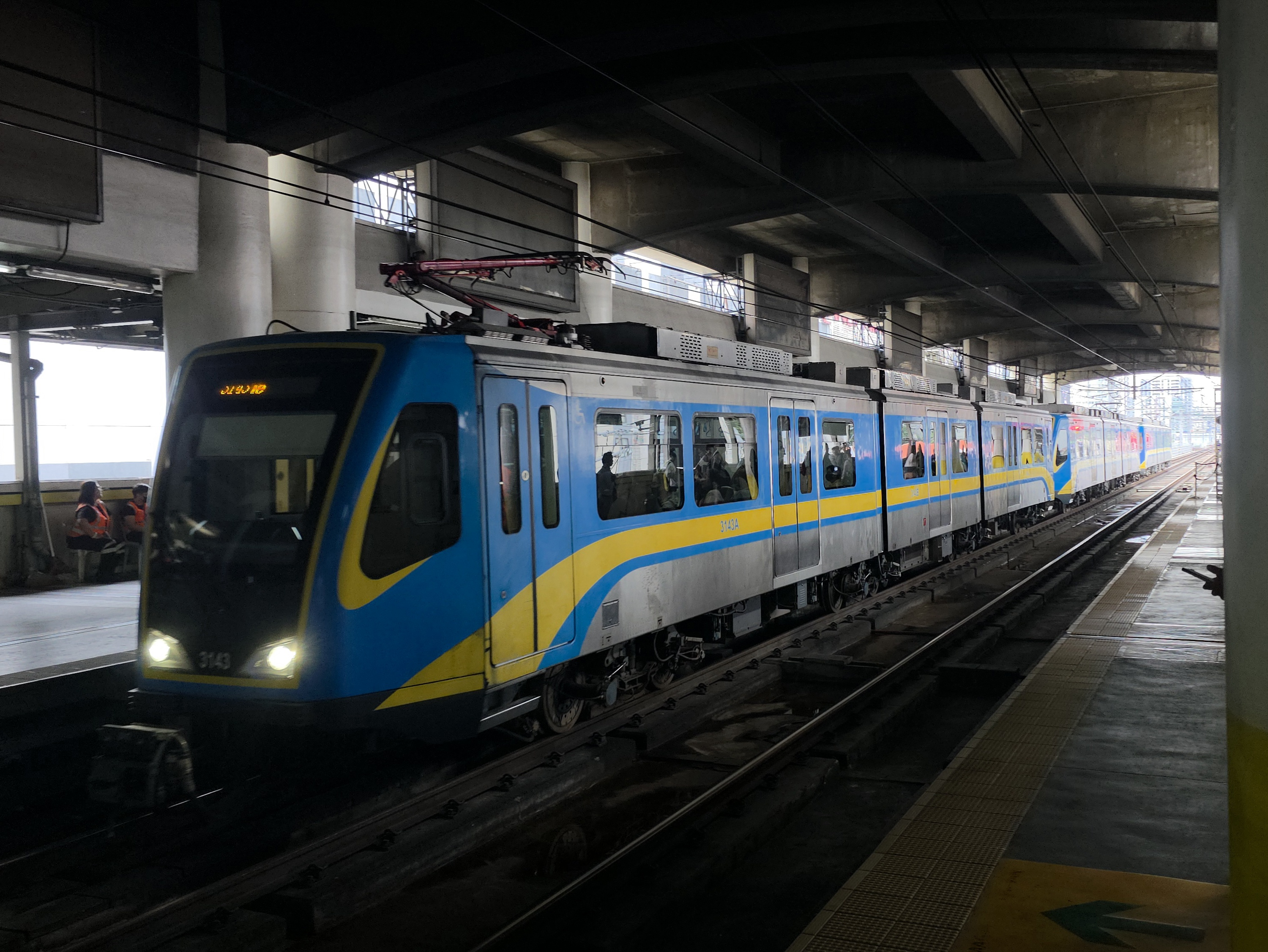
An 8MLB light rail vehicle operating in the Philippines.

== See also ==
- Ministry of Railways (China)
- Category:CRRC Dalian locomotives
