= Manchukuo National Railway =

1933–1945 railway now in Northeast China

Manchukuo National Railway 滿洲國有鐵道

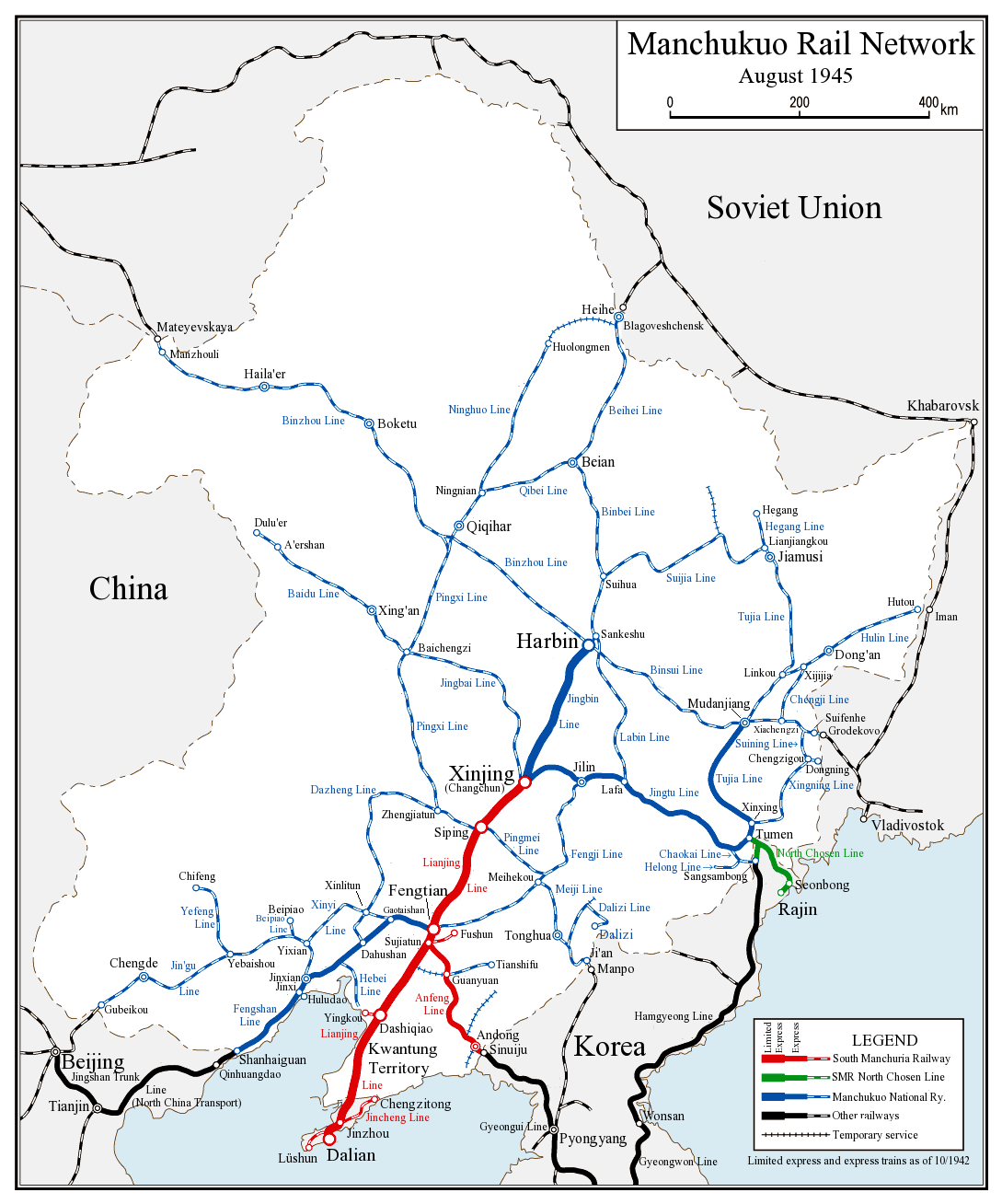

Overview
- Headquarters: Mukden, Manchukuo (1933–1943); Xinjing, Manchukuo (1943–1945)
- Locale: Manchukuo
- Dates of operation: 1933–1945
- Predecessor: Fengshan Railway; Huhai Railway; Jichang Jidun Railway; Jihai Railway; Qike Railway; Shenhai Railway; Sitao Railway; Taoang Railway; Taosuo Railway
- Successor: China Changchun Railway (1949–1952); China Railway (since 1952)

Technical
- Track gauge: 1,435 mm (4 ft 8 1/2 in) standard gauge
- Previous gauge: 1,520 mm (4 ft 11 27/32 in) Russian gauge ex CER

The Manchukuo National Railway (Traditional Chinese and Japanese kanji: 滿洲國有鐵道, Japanese romanization: Manshū Kokuyū Tetsudō) was the state-owned national railway company of Manchukuo. Generally called the "國線" ("National Line", Kokusen), it was controlled by the Manchukuo Ministry of Transportation and had its lines primarily in the central and northern parts of the country. In local newspapers it was simply referred to as "國鉄" (Japanese: Kokutetsu, "National Rail"). Although theoretically independent, it was managed by the South Manchuria Railway, a state-owned national railway company of the Empire of Japan, of which the Kwantung Army frequently intervened in its affairs.

== History ==
=== Sino-Japanese competition in railway construction ===
In Manchuria, the division of rights in mainland China manifested itself in the form of competition in railway construction. As a result, following the end of the Russo-Japanese War, railway rights in Manchuria were split between Russia, which operated the Chinese Eastern Railway, and Japan, which operated the South Manchuria Railway (Mantetsu). Meanwhile, in the western part of Manchuria there operated a Chinese-owned railway on the Beijing–Shanhaiguan–Fengtian route, the Jingfeng Railway, which had been built with a loan given by the British Hongkong Shanghai Bank. In 1913 and 1918, China and Japan concluded two railway agreements which strengthened Japanese rights in Manchuria, further increasing the dominance of the great powers in China. After the 1922 establishment of the Republic of China, political and military activities were undertaken to reclaim Chinese rights. In Manchuria this movement also reached the railways, in the form of attacks against Mantetsu and Japanese interests.

The Fengtian warlords were in effect governing Manchuria at the time, and its leader, Zhang Zuolin, was cooperative with Japan. Nevertheless, he exhibited an independent attitude regarding railways, and in 1924 he established the "3 Eastern Provinces Transportiation Committee" (東三省交通委員會), and began laying railway with Chinese capital. To counter this, Japanese interests opened five more rail lines. Zhang Zuolin accepted the Japanese right to build new lines, but the Fengtian clique continued to build railways as well. The Kwantung Army had for some time wanted to somehow divide the Fengtian warlords, and on 4 June 1928 they assassinated Zhang Zuolin. He was succeeded as leader of the Fengtian clique by his son, Zhang Xueliang, who in December of that year declared his allegiance to the Kuomintang, becoming fervently anti-Japanese.

After Zhang Xueliang's succession, he reorganised the 3 Provinces Transportation Committee into the "Northeastern Transportation Committee" (東北交通委員會), and undertook a strategy intended to surround and attack Mantetsu. The first step was the construction of a branch from the midpoint of the Jingfeng Railway to Huludao, where he built a new port. From then on, the Jingfeng Railway's network was planned with the goal of encircling and undermining the Japanese-owned railway. This was a severe blow to Mantetsu. The Jingfeng Railways new lines all ran parallel to the Mantetsu lines, several kilometres away, but shippers who previously had no choice but to use Mantetsu's service moved their business to the Chinese-owned company, even if its line was further away. The Japanese protested strongly on the basis of the Sino-Japanese Treaty concerning the Three Provinces (中日會議東三省事宜條約), in which it had been agreed that no railways running parallel to Mantetsu lines would be built. The Fengtian clique ignored this, and the conflict between the two railways intensified.

=== Establishment of Manchukuo and succession of rights ===
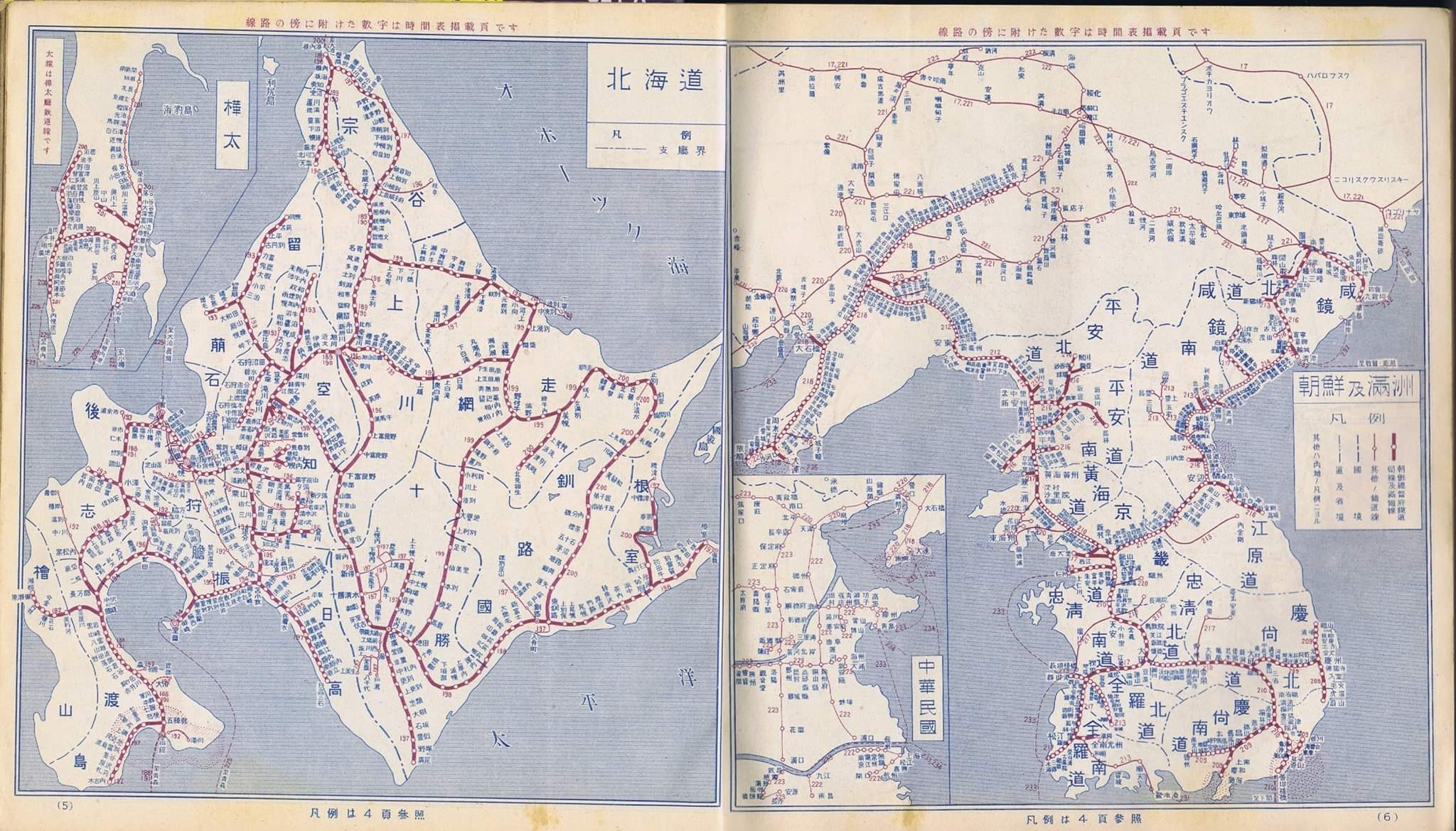
Japanese Government Railways map of Hokkaido, Chosen, Karahuto, and Manchukuo

In order to break the stalemate in the conflict between Japan and the Fengtian warlords, including the conflict over railways, the Kwantung Army took action, staging the Mukden Incident, in which a Japanese soldier detonated a small quantity of dynamite near a Mantetsu line on 18 September 1931; although no damage was inflicted, it was blamed on Chinese terrorists, and was used as a pretext for the Japanese invasion of Manchuria. The Fengtian clique, which effectively had been the government of Manchuria until that time, collapsed in October. As the Northeastern Transportation Committee was dissolved with the collapse of the Fengtian junta, the Kwantung Army established the "New Northeastern Transportation Committee" (新東北交通委員會) on 23 October, which temporarily took over management of the railways. By February 1932, the Kwantung Army had occupied all of Manchuria. To avoid international criticism, the Kwantung Army established the puppet state of Manchukuo on 1 March 1932. Consequently, the management of the railways was transferred from the Transportation Committee to the new Manchukuo Ministry of Transportation. Each railway company remained independent - no "state-owned" railway company was established at this time.

=== Creation of the Manchukuo National Railway ===
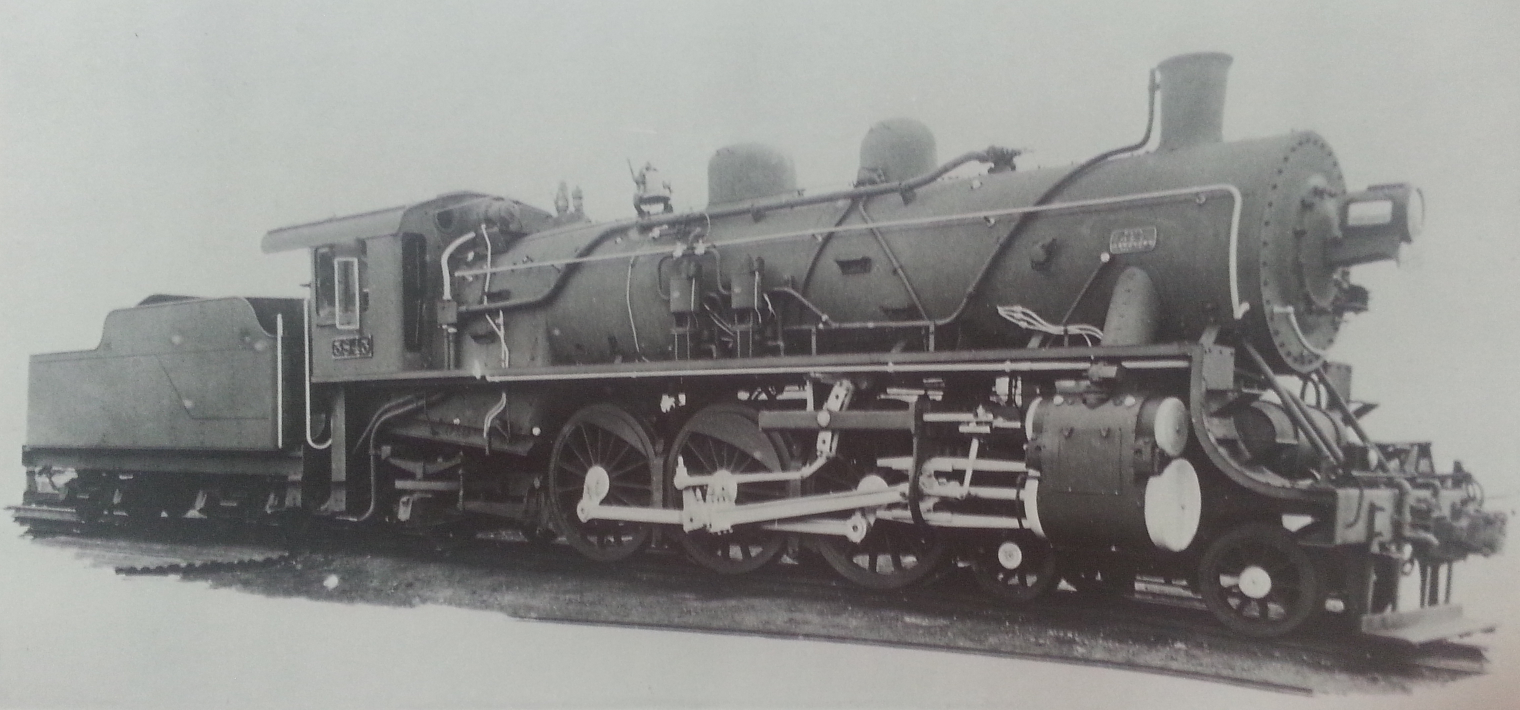
Builder's photo of locomotive Pashishi-5845, built for the National Railway by Kisha Seizō, 1936

Less than a year later, the "Railway Act" was passed on 9 February 1933, which nationalised all railways, and went into effect on the same day, establishing the Manchukuo National Railway. However, on the very same day as they were nationalised, all railway companies received a directive from the Ministry of Transportation instructing them to hand over their operations to the South Manchuria Railway. In effect, the Manchukuo Ministry of Transportation never managed "its" railway on its own, instead immediately outsourcing it to the Japanese-owned Mantetsu and removing itself entirely from the sector of business.

The Manchukuo National Railway was created out of nine companies.

- Fengshan Railway (奉山鉄路): Shanhaiguan–Fengtian, Huanggutun–Fengtian General Station, Dahushan–Tongliao, Goubangzi–Yingkou, Jinxian–Koubeiyingzi, Jinlingsi–Beipiao, Lianshan–Huludao. This was the oldest railway in Manchuria, established in 1899 as an extension of the Jingfeng Railway. The full network, including branch lines, was completed in 1927. Initially part of the Jingfeng Railway, it became an independent entity on 9 January 1932. This Yingkou Station was not the same as the Yingkou Station as Mantetsu's station of the same name.
- Huhai Railway (呼海鉄路): Machuankou–Hailun. This railway in Heilongjiang Province was originally planned during the Qing dynasty, but the Xinhai Revolution prevented it from being built. An agreement was subsequently made with Russia to build the line, but due to the October Revolution these plans also fell through. Construction finally began in 1925 as a joint venture between the government and private interests, and the line was completed in December 1928. The line ran north from Machuankou, which was on the opposite bank of the river from Harbin. As Harbin was a central point of the Chinese Eastern Railway, conflict arose with the CER, and the line remained isolated from the rest of Manchuria's rail network at the time of the nationalisation.
- Jichang Jidun Railway (吉長吉敦鉄路): Xinjing–Jilin, Jilin–Dunhua, Jiaohe–Naizishan. This was originally two companies, the Jichang Railway (吉長鉄路) and the Jidun Railway (吉敦鉄路), which were both joint ventures between Japan and the Republic of China. The Jichang Railway was completed in October 1912, and the Jidun Railway was completed in October 1928. Management of both railways was entrusted to Mantetsu. As the expenses for the short railways were too high, the two companies were merged in November 1931, as a cost-management measure.
- Jihai Railway (吉海鉄路): Chaoyangzhen–Jilin. Opened in August 1929, it operated in conjunction with the Shenhai Railway to connect Fengtian with Jilin City. It was one of the routes built parallel to Mantetsu as part of Zhang Xueliang's anti-Mantetsu efforts.
- Qike Railway (斉克鉄路): Qiqihar–Ang'angxi, Yushuntun–East Ang'angxi, Qiqihar–Taian, Ningnian–Laha. Initially, the Qike Railway had planned only to build north from Qiqihar; the line south from there was originally planned by the Taoang Railway. The Taoang Railway was unable to realise that plan due to problems getting permission to cross the Chinese Eastern Railway, but after an intervention by the Northeast Transportation Committee, the line was built - by the Qike Railway - in 1928. The first section to be built was the Qiqihar–Keshan section. At the North Manchuria Railway (Chinese Eastern Railway) Qiqihar Station this line connected with the narrow-gauge Qi'ang Light Railway.
- Shenhai Railway (瀋海鉄路): Fengtian–Hailong–Chaoyangzhen, Shahe–Xi'an. This was originally one of the routes that Japan received the right to build under the terms of the Sino-Japanese railway agreements of 1913 and 1918. As the construction never took place, the rights were given to Chinese interests in 1924. Construction was undertaken by the Fengtian clique's "Three Provinces Transportation Commission", and the line was completed in August 1928. Although it was originally a semi-private railway, in practical terms it was government-run at all times. It was originally called "Fenghai Railway" (奉海鉄路). It was one of the routes built parallel to Mantetsu as part of Zhang Xueliang's anti-Mantetsu efforts.
- Sitao Railway (四洮鉄路): Sipingjie–Zhengjiatun–Taonan, Zhengjiatun–Tongliao. This was originally one of the routes that Japan received the right to build under the terms of the Sino-Japanese railway agreements of 1913 and 1918. The entire network was completed in November 1923. An agreement to entrust management to Mantetsu was signed in 1931, but was not implemented until after nationalisation.
- Taoang Railway (洮昂鉄路): Taonan–Ang'angxi. This railway was established in 1924 as a joint venture between Mantetsu and the Fengtian clique, with construction of the line being completed in July 1926. It was originally planned to continue the line to Qiqihar, but permission to cross the Chinese Eastern Railway could not be secured. See the Qike Railway below for further information.
- Taosuo Railway (洮索鉄路): Baichengzi–Huaiyuanzhen. This is one of the five railways whose construction was ordered by the Fengtian clique in 1927. Planning and construction was undertaken by the Northeastern Transportation Committee, as part of the network intended to surround Mantetsu. By February 1931 it was not yet completed.

After the nationalisation and the creation of the Manchukuo National Railway, each former company was reformed as a "Railway Bureau", e.g. the Fengshan Railway became the "Fengshan Railway Bureau" (奉山鉄路局), and each former railway's lines were named as a group, e.g., the entire network of the Fengshan Railway was called the "Fengshan Line" (奉山線). Due to the fact that the various railways had been independent, in several cities it was the case that there were several separate railway stations, which left the National Railway with a complicated organisational structure.

=== Establishment of the General Railway Administration ===
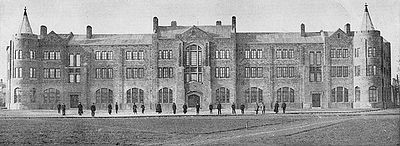
Railway headquarters in Xinjing (Changchun)

On 1 March 1933, just under a month after the operation and management of the National Railway was entrusted to Mantetsu, the "General Railway Administration" was established at Mukden and the "Railway Construction Bureau" at Dalian. As a result of this, lines owned by Mantetsu were called "Company Lines" (社線, Ch. shèxiàn, Ja. shasen), while those of the National Railway were called "National Lines" (國線, Ch. guóxiàn, Ja. kokusen). Although the General Railway Administration was officially a department of Mantetsu, in reality the Kwantung Army, which was secretly the power behind the Manchukuo government and wanting to take advantage of the railways of Manchuria, was deeply involved in its operation. When the General Railway Administration was set up, an "Agreement on the Management of Railways, Ports and Rivers" was signed. This gave the Kwantung Army extensive management rights over Mantetsu, and treated the Administration as if it were a department of the Kwantung Army.

However, this discomfited the Mantetsu side deeply, as according to another agreement, much of Mantetsu's profits were to be diverted to the Kwantung Army. In addition, many of the routes the Kwantung Army sought to build were planned with military interests in mind, which, from the point of view of the railway as a business, were regarded as having very little potential profit. Further, the General Administration intervened in route planning on several occasions, changing or rejecting planned lines as "not militarily important". Although Mantetsu were reluctant to accept these, there was little choice but to obey the Kwantung Army's directives. As a result of conflicts such as these, the relationship between Mantetsu and the Kwantung Army, which had initially been positive and cooperative, deteriorated rapidly, and each side grew more distrustful of the other.

Meanwhile, the General Administration and the Construction Bureau proceeded with the construction of new lines as planned. As lines were consolidated and redundancies eliminated, the "group naming" of railway lines ceased and lines received new names, but the stations remained as they had previously been. On 1 April 1934, the railway stations in Mukden, Xinjing, Harbin and Taonan were consolidated.

=== Acquisition of the North Manchuria Railway and the General Directorate of Railways ===
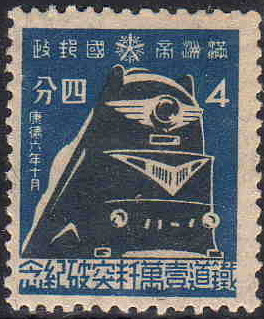
Manchukuo postage stamp commemorating the 10,000 km network

The biggest single event of the Railway General Administration period was the acquisition of the North Manchuria Railway - the former Chinese Eastern Railway. Although the Chinese share of the CER was nationalised when the National Railway was formed, the Russian share remained in Russian hands. However, due to the construction of new lines by the National Railway, the importance of the CER line was significantly reduced. Consequently, the Soviet government, which had become the owner after the establishment of the RSFSR and had found ownership of the railway an unnecessary burden, decided to accept the acquisition proposal, and on 23 March 1935 the Railway General Administration formally acquired the North Manchuria Railway and merged it into the Manchukuo National Railway.

As the NMR had been built to Russian 5 ft (1,524 mm) gauge, over the next two years the former NMR network was converted to standard gauge. Of particular note is the line between Xinjing and Harbin which a team of 2,500 workers regauged in its entirety in three hours on 31 August 1935. Following the acquisition of the North Manchuria Railway, all railways in Manchuria, with the exception of those with very small local-interest routes, were either National Lines or Company Lines.

Subsequently, the Railway General Administration, the Railway Construction Bureau and Mantetsu's Railways Department were merged, creating the "General Directorate of Railways" on 1 October 1936, leaving the Manchukuo National Railway even less "National" than before. This move to integrate Mantetsu and the National Railway served to frustrate the Kwantung Army, which had wanted free rein over the National Railway.

Meanwhile, construction of new lines continued, reaching a total of 10,000 km (6,200 mi) in 1939. Commemorative stamps were issued, and Mantetsu itself held a celebration and made a commemorative film. After reaching that milestone, expansion slowed, with new construction being limited to short branchlines.

It was at this peak state that the Pacific War began. After the outbreak of war, in order to improve wartime efficiency, organisational reforms were conducted to streamline operations. On 1 May 1943 the headquarters were moved to Xinjing, the General Directorate of Railways was abolished, and operations were entrusted to the headquarters. Through this reform, the National Railway and Mantetsu were completely merged in all but name, and remained so until the end of the war.

=== After 1945 ===
On 9 August 1945, the Soviet Union declared war on Japan and invaded Manchukuo. On 15 August, Japan accepted the Potsdam Declaration; this news reached Manchukuo two days later, on 17 August. As a result, the Emperor of Manchukuo, Puyi, abdicated on the 18th, and Manchukuo ceased to exist. Additionally, the Kwantung Army withdrew entirely, leaving Mantetsu virtually the governing body of the region. Because the owner disappeared literally overnight, the National Railway was no longer "national". Its management collapsed entirely, leaving Mantetsu to administer it as its own route.

On 20 August, Soviet troops occupied Mantetsu's head office, and on 22 September, with the establishment of the China Changchun Railway (中國長春鐵路), Mantetsu itself, along with the Manchukuo National Railway, ceased to exist.

== Routes ==
Line name					
Chinese	Japanese	Endpoints	Length (km)	Origin	Remarks
Baidu Line (zh)	Hakuto Line	Baichengzi–Duluer	376.5	ex Taosuo Railway (Baichengzi–Ningjiafan)	A'ershan–Duluer section closed.
Beihei Line	Hokkoku Line	Bei'an–Heihe	302.9		
Beipiao Line	Hokuhyō Line	Jinlingsi–Beipiao	17.9	ex Fengshan Railway	
Binbei Line	Hinboku Line	Sankeshu–Bei'an	326.1	ex Huhai Railway (Xinsongpu–Hailun) ex Haike Railway (Hailun–Bei'an)	
Binjiang Line	Hinkō Line	Harbin–Sankeshu	8.8	ex North Manchuria Railway (Harbin–Binjiang)	Now part of the Sankeshu Railway (zh)
Binzhou Line	Hinshū Line	Harbin–Manzhouli	934.8	ex North Manchuria Railway	
Binsui Line	Hinsui Line	Harbin–Suifenhe	546.4	ex North Manchuria Railway	
Chaokai Line	Chōkai Line	Chaoyangchuan–Sangsambong, Korea	60.6	ex Tiantu Railway	
Chengji Line (zh)	Jōkei Line	Xiachengzi–Xijijia	103.4	ex Muling Railway (Xiachengzi–Lishuzhen)	
Dalizi Line (zh)	Dairisshi Line	Yayuan–Dalizi	112.3		
Dazheng Line (zh)	Daitei Line	Dahushan–Zhengjiatun (zh)	366.2	ex Fengshan Railway (Dahushan–Tongliao), ex Sitao Railway (Tongliao–Zhengjiatun)	
Dongmen Connecting Line	Tōmon Connecting Line	Dongmen signal station–Xinxiangfang	6.2		Goods only. Now part of the Sankeshu Railway (zh)
Fengji Line (zh)	Hōkitsu Line	Fengtian–Jilin	447.4	ex Shenhai Railway (Fengtian–Chaoyangzhen), Jihai Railway (Chaoyangzhen–Jilin)	
Fengshan Line	Hōzan Line	Fengtian–Shanhaiguan	419.6	ex Fengshan Railway	Now part of the Jingha Railway
Fengyu Connecting Line	Hōyū Connecting Line	Fengtian–Yuguo (zh)	17.5		Goods only. Now part of the Huanggutun Railway.
Fushuncheng Connecting Line	Bushunjō Connecting Line	Fushun–Fushun City	4.5		goods only
Gaoxin Line (zh)	Kōshin Line	Gaotaishan–Xinlitun	60.6		
Hailin Line (zh)	Kairin Line	41.4	Aotou–Changtingzhen	Now Huolonggou Railway.	
Harbin Quay Line	Harubinfutō Line	Harbin–Harbin Quay	2.9	ex North Manchuria Railway (Harbin–Baqu)	
Hebei Line	Kahoku Line	Goubangzi–Hebei	91.1	ex Fengshan Railway	Closed.
Hegang Line (zh)	Kakkō Line	Lianjiangkou–Hegang	54.3		
Heihe Quay Line	Kokkafutō Line	Heihe–Heihe Quay	4.2		goods only
Helong Line (zh)	Waryū Line	Longjing–Helong	61.6		
Hengshan Line (zh)	Kōzan Line	Jining–Hengshan	12.4		
Heshui Connecting Line	Gōsui Connecting Line	Xiansui signal station–Heshui signal station			goods only
Huanggutun Connecting Line	Ōkuton Connecting Line	Huanggutun–North Fengtian	2.8		Goods only. Now part of the Huanggutun Railway.
Hulin Line	Korin Line	Linkou–Hutou	355.7		
Huludao Line	Korodō Line	Jinxi (zh)–Huludao Quay	12.1	ex Fengshan Railway	
Jiamusi Quay Line	Kamushifutō Line	Jiamusi–Jiamusi Quay	3.6		goods only
Jiangjunbao Connecting Line	Shōgunhō Connecting Line	Fushun–Jiangjunbao signal station	3.6		goods only
Jiangnan Connecting Line	Kōnan Connecting Line	Taipingqiao–Jiangnan signal station	2.2		Goods only
Jingbai Line (zh)	Kyōhaku Line	Xinjing–Baichengzi	332.6		
Jingbin Line	Kyōhin Line	Xinjing–Harbin	242.0	ex North Manchuria Railway	Now part of the Jingha Railway
Jingtu Line (zh)	Kyōto Line	Xinjing–Tumen	528.0	ex Jichang Jidun Railway (Xinjing–Dunhua), ex Duntu Railway (Dunhua–Haerbaling)	
Jin'gu Line	Kinko Line	Jinxian–Gubeikou	542.3	ex Fengshan Railway (Jinxian–Koubeiyingzi)	Now part of the Jincheng Railway (zh). Chengde–Gubeikou section dismantled in 1945.
Jinzhu Line	Kinshu Line	Jiangbei–Jinzhu	18.8	ex Jilin Railway (Xinjilin–Jinzhu)	Made part of the Longshu Line in 1941
Kaidaohui Line	Kaidaokai Line	Yabuluoni–Hengdaohezi	59.2		Now part of the Binsui Railway and the Yalin Railway (zh)
Labin Line	Rōhin Line	Sankeshu–Lafa	265.5		
Lianjiangkou Quay Line	Renkakō Connecting Line	Lianjiangkou–Lianjiangkou Quay	3.5		Goods only
Liaogong Line (zh)	Ryōkei Line	Liaoyang–Benxi	69.0		
Longli Line (zh)	Ryōrei Line	Longtanshan–Daliman	22.4		Now called Longfeng Railway
Longshu Line (zh)	Ryūjo Branch Line	Longtanshan–Shulan	86.0		
Meiji Line (zh)	Baishū Line	Meihekou–Manpo, Korea	255.5		
Meiyao Line		Shulan–Meiyao	30.4	ex Jilin Railway	Made part of the Longshu Line in 1941
Ninghuo Line	Neikaku Line	Ningnian–Huolongmen	284.0	ex Qike Railway (Ningnian–Laha)	
Pingqi Line (zh)	Heisei Line	Siping–Qiqihar	571.4	Sitao Railway (Siping–Taonan); Taoang Railway (Taonan–Sanjianfang); Qike Railway (Sanjianfang–Qiqihar)	
Qibei Line (zh)	Seihoku Line	Qiqihar–Bei'an	231.5	ex Qike Railway (Qiqihar–Tai'an) ex Taike Railway (Tai'an–Keshan) ex Haike Railway (Keshan–Bei'an)	
Sankeshu Quay Line	Sankajufutō Line	Binjiang–Sankeshu	4.0		goods only. Now part of the Sankeshu Railway (zh)
Shenyang Connecting Line	Shin'yō Connecting Line	Fengtian–Shenyang	10.7		Goods only. Now part of the Shenda Railway (zh)
Simei Line (zh)	Shibai Line	Siping–Meihekou	149.2	ex Shenhai Railway (Xi'an–Lianhe)	
Suijia Line (zh)	Suika Line	Suihua–Jiamusi	381.8		
Suining Line (zh)	Suinei Line	Hexi–Dongning	91.1		
Taoyu Line	Tōyu Line	Taolaizhao–Yushu	56.0		Now part of the Taoshu Railway.
Tujia Line (zh)	Toka Line	Tumen–Jiamusi	580.2		
Wangqing Connecting Line	Ōsei Connecting Line	Wangqing–Xiaowangqing	9.0		goods only
Xiangfang Connecting Line	Kōbō Connecting Line	Xiangfang–Dongmen signal station	5.1		goods only
Xiaoxin Connecting Line	Shōshin Connecting Line	Xiaogujia–Xinzhan	9.1		goods only
Xijian Line (zh)	Keikan Line	Gongyuan–Tianshifu	86.0	ex Xijian Railway (ja)	
Xingning Line	Shinnei Line	Xinxing–Chengzigou	216.1		Parts now part of the Binsui Railway
Xintonghua Line	Shintsūka Line	Tonghua–Xintonghua	4.2		
Xinyi Line (zh)	Shingi Line	Xinlitun–Yixian	131.5		
Yefeng Line (zh)	Yōhō Line	Yebaishou–Chifeng	146.9		
Yuhong Connecting Line	Ukō Connecting Line	Yuhong signal station–Dacheng signal station	4.6		goods only
Yushu Line	Yuju Line	Yushutun–Ang'angxi	6.4	ex Qike Railway	Now part of Pingqi Railway (zh)

== Differences between the National Railway and Mantetsu ==
The Manchukuo National Railway, called the "National Lines", freely operated over Mantetsu lines (called "Company Lines"), and vice versa, without distinguishing it by who owned the line. Most passenger services were completely integrated with Mantetsu. However, in certain aspects there was a strict distinction.

=== Rolling stock types ===
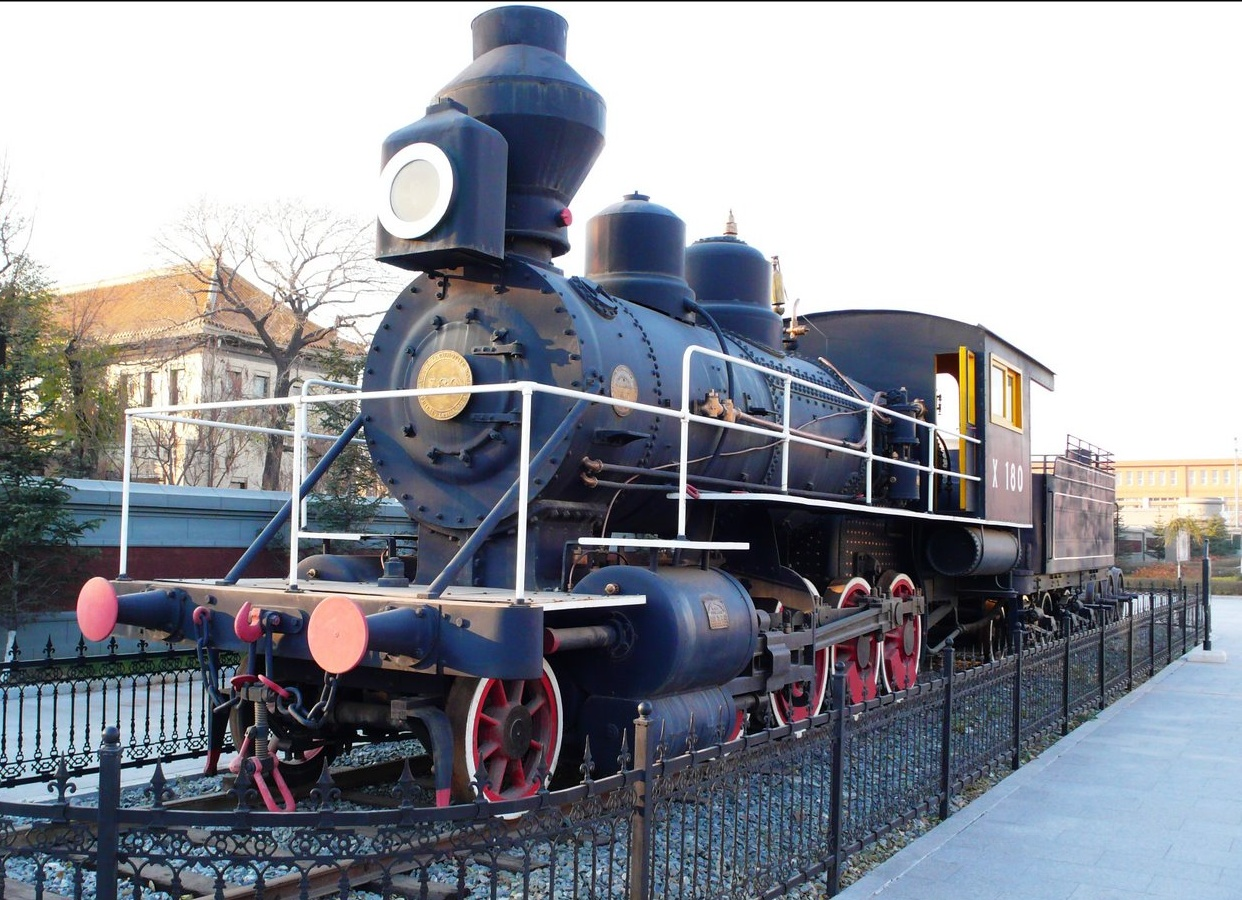
Russian class Kh (X) locomotive formerly of the Chinese Eastern Railway plinthed at Changchun. It was found buried, excavated, and restored in 2005. It is the only Chinese Eastern Railway locomotive left.

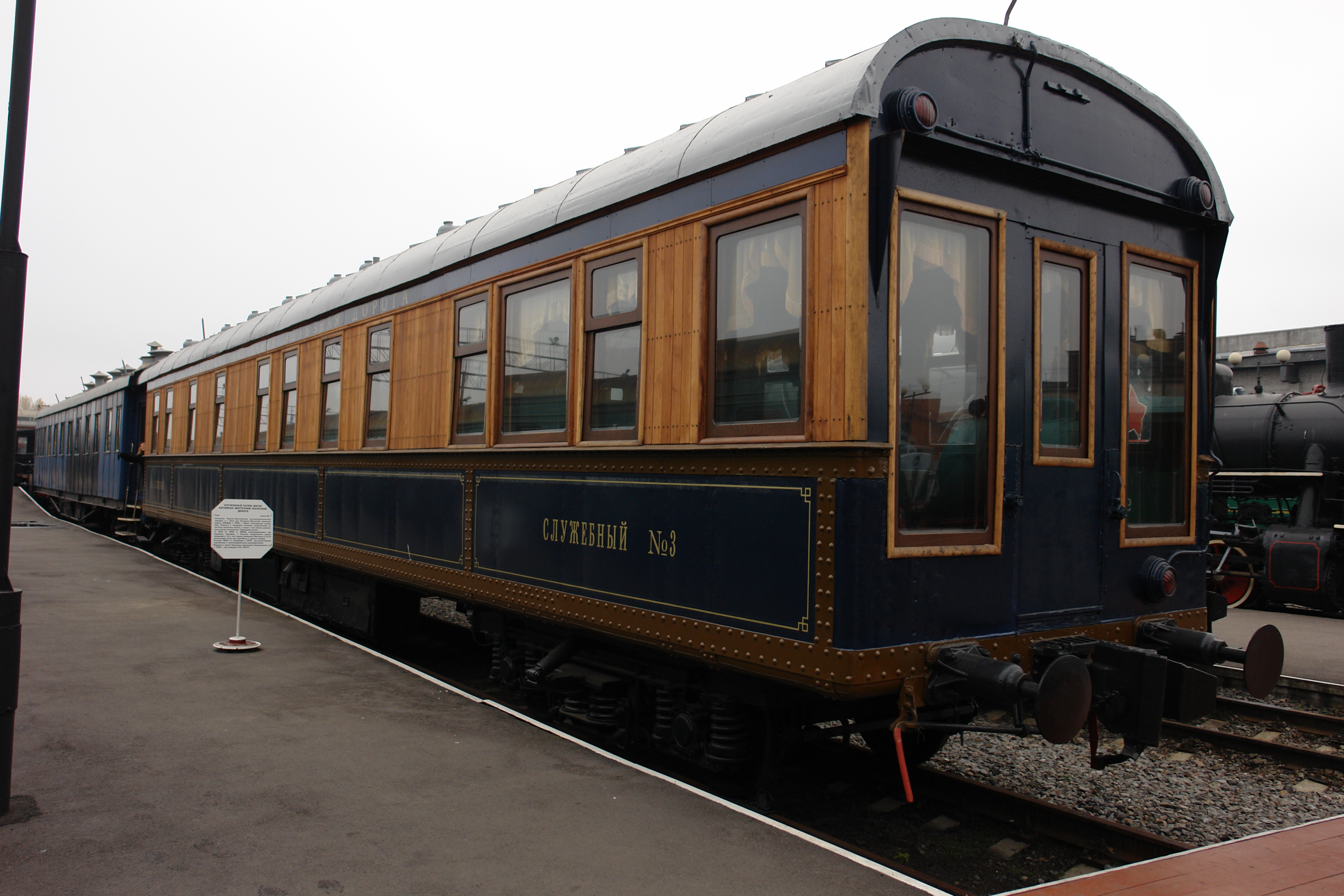
Saloon Coach formerly of the Chinese Eastern Railway at the Russian Railway Museum. It is the only piece of Chinese Eastern Railway rolling stock left.

The same types of rolling stock were used by both the National Railway and Mantetsu. However, the MNR also had equipment that had been inherited from the formerly private railways, which was different from the standard types. Although some locomotive types differed, in general they were similar, and those built by Mantetsu's factories were the same. As a result, from October 1933 the National Railway's locomotives were classified according to the Mantetsu classification system.

Conversely, passenger carriages differed significantly from those of Mantetsu, and there were many designs of which there were only a very few examples, or even only a single example. As a result, these miscellaneous types ended up being assigned class designations with "9" (e.g. Ha9, ハ9), or were classified with the old railway company's name plus the type designation, e.g. 瀋海ロネ1, Shenhai RoNe1; gradually, these types were scrapped.

With the acquisition of the North Manchuria Railway in 1935, equipment differences became much more marked. This was because the NMR was built to Russian broad gauge, and the equipment conformed to that standard; these were referred to as "broad vehicles" (広軌車輛) by the National Railway. This equipment all had old-style couplers and buffers, independent heaters in each passenger car, and were very different and much less modern than Mantetsu equipment. As a result, this equipment could not be used together with other equipment. Locomotives were classified with letters of the alphabet instead of numbers (e.g. テホA), and passenger equipment classifications were composed of the standard type designation plus オ ("o"), e.g. ハオ "HaO". Due to the fact that so much of the North Manchuria Railway's equipment was outdated, after the regauging of the NMR lines it was decided not to convert the rolling stock to standard gauge. Exceptions included some of the newest locomotives; 44 locomotives of the DekaA (デカA) class and six of the DabuA (ダブA) class were converted to standard gauge, becoming National Railway classes Dekani (デカニ) and Daburo (ダブロ, later Satai (サタイ)) respectively. A small number of passenger carriages were also converted and remained in use. However, only converted locomotives lasted until the end of the war; the last of the passenger cars were scrapped by 1943.

Not all of the unmodified locomotives were scrapped; after being withdrawn from service, nearly 100 locomotives were stored at the Harbin railway works; around 70 of these have been identified. Although the reason for storing locomotives that could not be used on Manchuria's standard gauge lines is unknown, Yoshizumi Ishihara speculated in his 1972 book, "南満洲鉄道 鉄道の発展と機関車" (The Development of the South Manchuria Railway and its Locomotives) that they were kept for use on Soviet lines, in case Japan ever invaded the Soviet Far East.

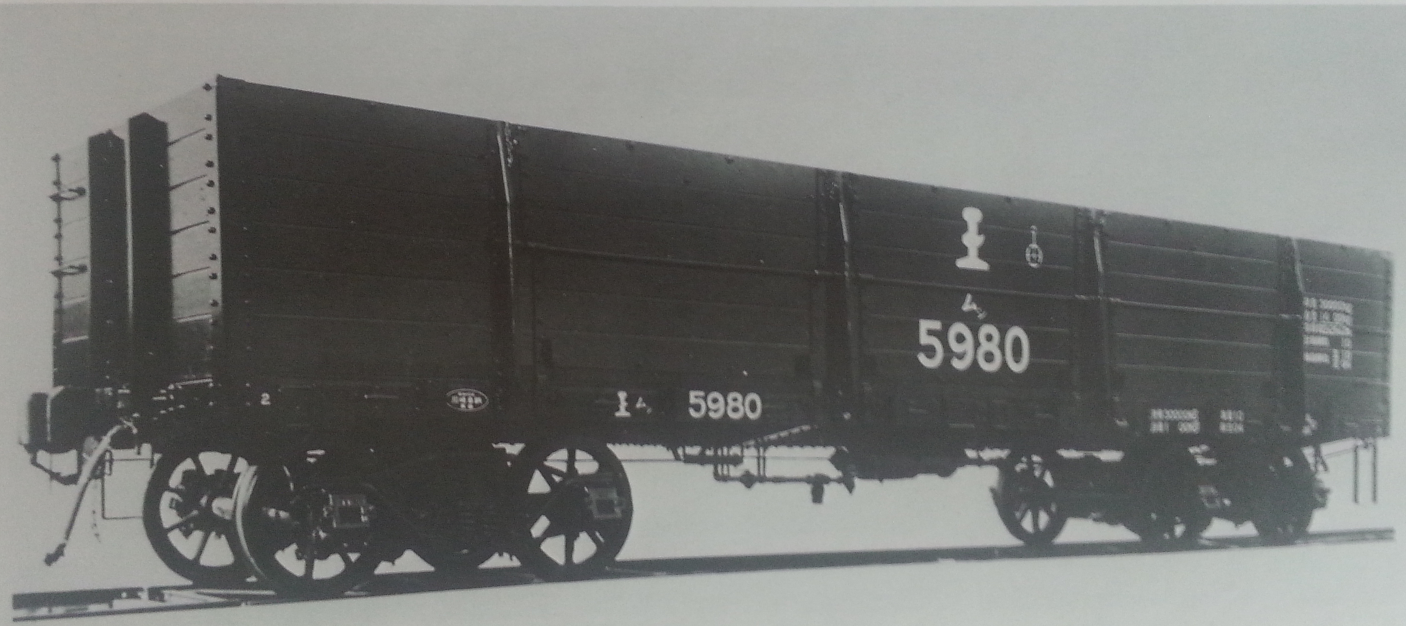
Builders photo of Manchukuo National Railway gondola Mu4-5980

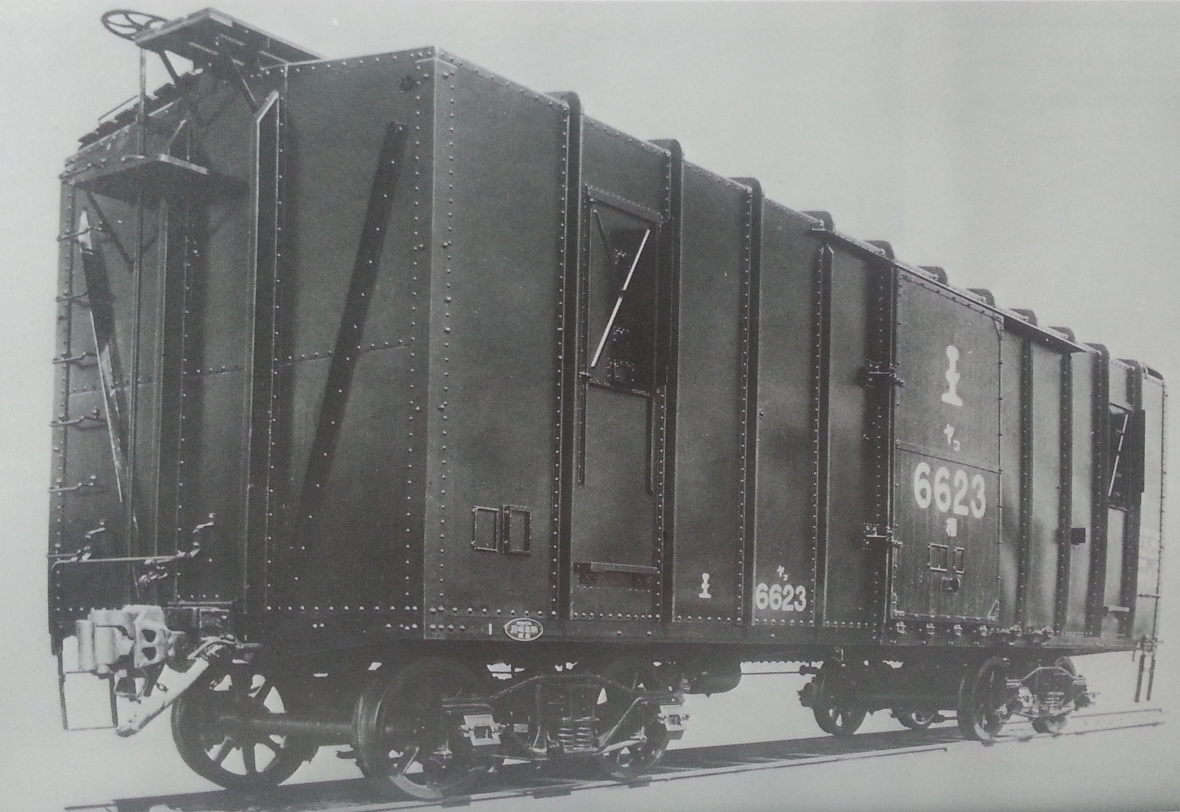
Builders photo of Manchukuo National Railway boxcar Ya5-6623

In addition to the rolling stock inherited from the nationalised private railways, the National Railway operated locomotives transferred from Mantetsu. A strict distinction was made between rolling stock belonging to the National Railway and that belonging to Mantetsu.

National Railway locomotives, even if they were of the same class as Mantetsu locomotives, were given a different class designation and numbered in the 5000 or 6000 series or higher, to distinguish them from those belonging to Mantetsu. Locomotives that were transferred from Mantetsu to the National Railway were reclassified and renumbered. However, as the number of locomotives increased, and the North China Transportation Company was established as a subsidiary, this method became too complex, so in April 1938 the classification and numbering system was overhauled. A uniform classification system was introduced for all three railways, with locomotives of the same type receiving the same class designation. Only the numbering indicated ownership, with locomotives of the National Railway being numbered in the 501-1000 range.

Passenger carriages, which had not been previously distinguished, were likewise renumbered. In the classification system of April 1938, 3rd class carriages were numbered in the 2001-4000 range. When powered railcars were introduced, a new classification system was introduced, with National Railway railcar classes - otherwise identical to the Mantetsu classes - having the class designation preceded by "國" (koku, "country"). Diesel railcars of the National Railway were numbered in the 2000 series. The April 1938 system changed this, introducing a new, unified classification system, and numbering petrol and diesel railcars belonging to the National Railway in the 200 series.

Freight equipment was distinctively American in appearance.

=== Fares and goods rates ===
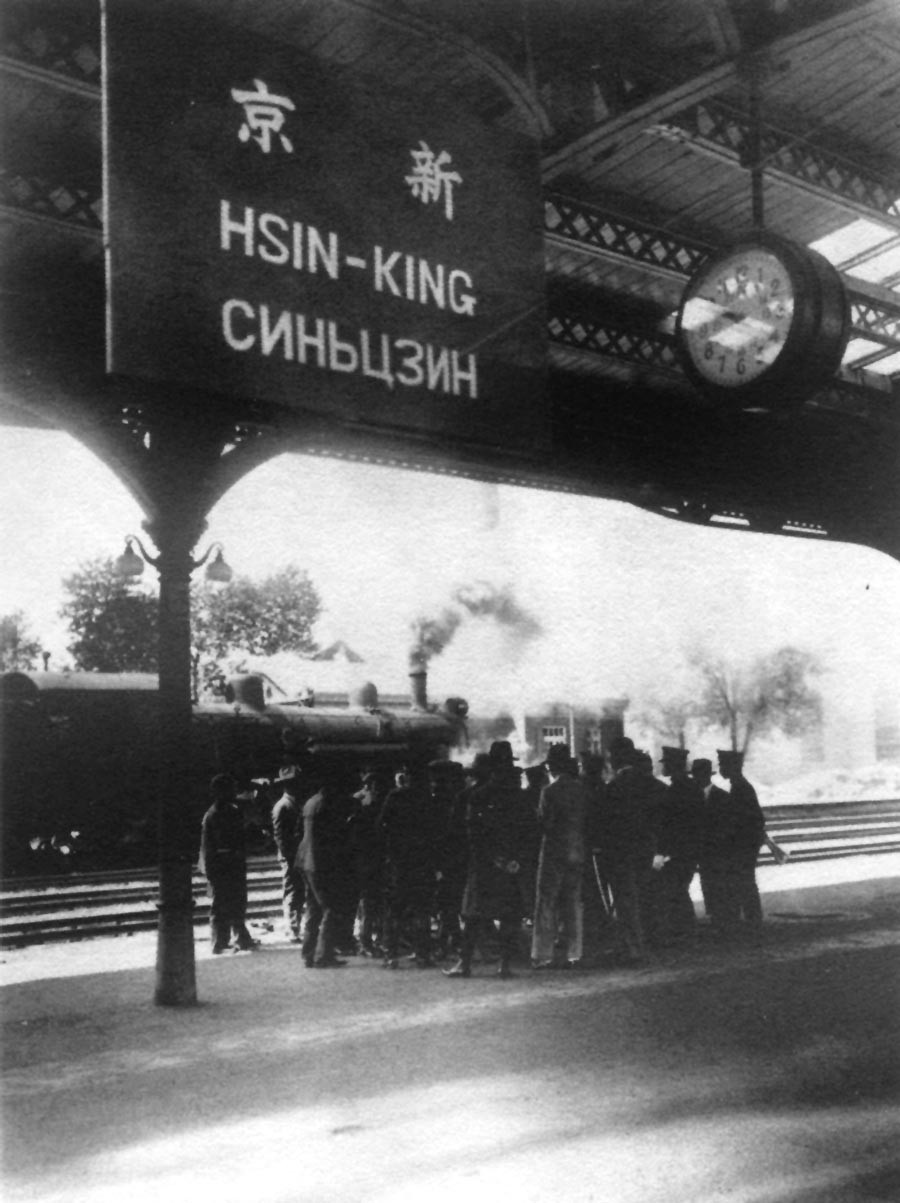
A view of the platform at Xinjing station

On the passenger system, most regulations were identical to those of Mantetsu, so there was no major difference between Mantetsu and the National Railway. However, due to the use of different currencies, passenger fares and goods rates varied. The method of calculating and collecting fares and goods charges when moving between company and national lines changed on several a number of occasions according to the needs of the time.

Immediately after the creation of the National Railway, in cases where connection was being made between the two railways, an "interchange ticket" was issued and the fare was collected. This was carried over from the time before the establishment of Manchukuo, when such interchange agreements had been made with the privately owned railways that were later nationalised. Mantetsu's official currency was the Korean yen, while the National Railway the used Haikwan tael. After calculating the fares for the sections on the company and national lines separately, they were converted to the currency used by the railway owning the station where the ticket was being bought, based on a standardised conversion rate, and the two fares were then added together to determine the final ticket price. For example, if a ticket was bought for a trip from Dalian to Jilin, the price was payable in Korean yen, as Dalian was on Mantetsu; if the ticket was for a trip from Jilin to Dalian, it was payable in taels, as Jilin was on the National Railway. The interchange agreement also limited where such interchange tickets could be bought, and so they were available for purchase only at major stations.

This system was continued after the establishment of the General Railway Administration, and for lines with which there had been no interchange agreement, new agreements were concluded. After the establishment of Manchukuo, the National Railway's official currency was changed to the new Manchukuo yuan, and aside from a necessary adjustment to the conversion rate, the system of calculating interchange fares remained unchanged.

From 1 April 1934 this system was abolished, and a unified system of fare calculation was introduced. Mantetsu continued to calculate fares in Korean yen and sen (1 yen = 100 sen), and the National Railway continued to use Manchukuo yuan/chiao/fen (1 yuan = 10 chiao = 100 fen). The fare for the entire ticket was calculated in the appropriate currency, and the ticket was marked in those units as well. Ticket purchasing was also made more convenient, by allowing sales of interchange tickets at all stations except for halts and certain special stations. However, as the Manchukuo yuan was silver-based, and the Korean yen was gold-based, the ticket fare was converted to the currency used by the railway owning the point of sale, based on conversion rates issued regularly by Mantetsu. Many complaints were received about the complexity and inconvenience of this system.

On 3 October 1935, the Manchukuo yuan was taken off the silver standard and was pegged to the Japanese yen, and from 5 October the Manchukuo yuan was treated as equivalent to the Korean yen for the purchase of tickets. As a result, one Manchukuo yuan at a National Railway station became equivalent to one Korean yen at a Mantetsu station, so tickets had the same face value regardless of which railway issued the ticket. Fares continued to be calculated separately according to the distance-based fare of the railway on which a given portion of the trip was to be made, then added up. From 1 January 1938 it was further simplified, with tickets for trips originating at a station of the National Railway being calculated for the entire trip according to the fare-kilometer distance of the National Railway and sold in yuan, and tickets for trips starting at a Mantetsu station being calculated according to Mantetsu fare schedules and sold in Korean yen.

The National Railway's fare rates were separate from those of Mantetsu, and initially were divided by railway district. When the Railway General Administration defined transport regulations on 1 April 1934 there were four districts. A unitary system was introduced on 1 February 1936, with fare rates fixed slightly higher than those of Mantetsu. On 1 December 1940 Mantetsu and National Railway fare rates were equalised. On 1 October 1941 a toll tax was introduced, which was calculated according to the distance to be travelled.

Express fares were based on a different system than on Mantetsu; initially, there was no surcharge for limited express tickets. When the surcharge was introduced, there were no express trains that travelled directly between national and company lines, so the surcharge applied only to the National Railway. Surcharges were also converted to the currency used at the point of sale.

As sleeping car fares were determined not by fare-kilometer but on a per-night basis, even in the case of a direct train between the two railways, the specified fare was simply collected in Korean yen at Mantetsu stations, and in Manchukuo yuan at National Railway stations. However, if a sleeper ticket was bought at a station of the railway other than the one from which the sleeping car was to depart from, the sleeper fare had to be paid in the currency used at the departure station.

== Rolling Stock ==
=== Steam Locomotives ===
==== Express Passenger Locomotives ====
Class	Numbers	Class	Numbers	Wheel arrangement	Builder	Total in class	Image	Notes
Pre-1938		1938-1945						
パシ Pashi (to 9/33) パシク Pashiku	800–818 (to 9/33); 5950–5968	パシロ; Pashiro	501–519	4-6-2	Kawasaki, Kisha Seizō, Hitachi	19		"National Large Pashi" (國小パシ). New to MNR in 1933
パシニ; Pashini	?	パシシ; Pashishi	507−510	4-6-2	Shahekou	4		Nationalised from Sitao Railway
パシシ; Pashishi	5830–5839	パシサ; Pashisa	501–510	4-6-2	Hitachi	10		"National Small Pashi" (國小パシ). New to MNR in 1934
パシシ; Pashishi	5840–5859	パシサ; Pashisa	511–530	4-6-2	Hitachi, Kisha Seizō	20		"New National Small Pashi" (新國小パシ). New to MNR in 1936
パシコ; Pashiko	5900–5905	パシイ; Pashii	501–506	4-6-2	ALCo	6		From Mantetsu 1933
パシナ; Pashina	5920–5925	パシシ; Pashishi	501–506	4-6-2	Baldwin	6		From Mantetsu 1934
パシク; Pashiku	5969–5999, 15900–15927	パシロ; Pashiro	520–632	4-6-2	Kawasaki, Kisha Seizō, Hitachi, Nippon Sharyō	113		"New National Large Pashi" (新國小パシ). New to MNR 1937–1944
-	-	パシハ; Pashiha	501	4-6-2	Shahekou	1		Boxpok wheels. New to MNR 1940.

==== Ordinary Passenger Locomotives ====
Class	Numbers	Class	Numbers	Wheel arrangement	Builder	Total in class	Image	Notes
Pre-1938		1938-1945						
テホイ; Tehoi	?	テホシ; Tehoshi	501−5xx	4-6-0	Bryansk, Kharkov	?		Nationalised from North Manchuria Ry, classes Г, Г^{ч}, as MNR デカA; Г^{ч} converted to standard gauge => テホイ
テホニ; Tehoni	5621–5622	テホニ; Tehoni	501–502	4-6-0	ALCo	2		Nationalised from Jichang Jidun Railway in 1933
テホサ; Tehosa	5650–5651	テホイ; Tehoi	501–502	4-6-0	ALCo	2		From Mantetsu 1933
テホコ; Tehoko	5700–5704	テホサ; Tehosa	501–505	4-6-0	Beyer, Peacock & Company	5		Nationalised from Fengshan Railway in 1933

==== Freight Locomotives ====
Class	Numbers	Class	Numbers	Wheel arrangement	Builder	Total in class	Image	Notes
Pre-1938		1938-1945						
デカ; Deka	6900–6914	デカイ; Dekai	501–515	2-10-0	ALCo, Shahekou	15		From Mantetsu 1935
デカニ; Dekani	?	デカニ; Dekani	501–544	2-10-0	ALCo, Baldwin	44		Nationalised from North Manchuria Ry, classes Е^{ф}, Е^{с}, Е^{л}, as MNR デカA; converted to standard gauge => デカニ
ミカイ; Mikai	?	ミカナ; Mikana	523−5xx	2-8-2	ALCo			
ミカニ; Mikani	?	ミカサ; Mikasa	501−519	2-8-2	Škoda	19		Nationalised from the Qike, Huhai, and Sitao Railways
ミカサ; Mikasa	?	ミカナ; Mikana	517−522	2-8-2	ALCo	6		Nationalised from the Jihai Railway
ミカコ; Mikako	?	(to NCTC)	-	2-8-2	Kawasaki	?		Nationalised from Jichang Railway; to NCTC as Mikako in 1938
ミカロ; Mikaro	6600–6647	ミカロ; Mikaro	501–548	2-8-2	Kawasaki, Kisha Seizō, Hitachi, Nippon Sharyō	91		501–526: "National Small Mika" (国小ミカ), 1934; 527–548: "New National Small Mika" (新国小ミカ), 1935
ミカロ; Mikaro	6648–6699; 16600–16638	ミカロ; Mikaro	549–639; 645–724	2-8-2	Kawasaki, Kisha Seizō, Hitachi, Shahekou, Nippon Sharyō, Dalian	171		"New National Small Mika" (新国小ミカ); New to MNR 1936–1944; 640–644 to NCTC
ミカ Mika (1st) ミカナ Mikana (2nd)	1500–1533 (1st); 6700–6773 (2nd)	ミカイ; Mikai	501–574	2-8-2	ALCo, Shahekou, Kisha Seizō, Kawasaki, Hitachi, Nippon Sharyō	74		"National Big Mika" (国大ミカ); New to MNR 1935–1945
ミカナ; Mikana	6774–6899	ミカイ; Mikai	575–1283	2-8-2	Shahekou, Kisha Seizō, Kawasaki, Hitachi	709		"New National Big Mika" (新国大ミカ); New to MNR 1935–1945
ミカハ; Mikaha	6540−6555	ミカナ; Mikana	501−516	2-8-2	Kawasaki, Kisha Seizō	16		Nationalised from Jichang Ry 500 class
-	-	ミカク; Mikaku	501	2-8-2	Dalian Machine or Mitsubishi	1		Experimental water-recycler for long-distance operation. In testing ran 1,600 km (990 mi) without taking on water
モガ; Moga	?	モガイ; Mogai	520; 521–524; 528–533	2-6-0	Tangshan Arsenal, Baldwin	11		520 from Shenhai Ry 51 in 1933 (built Tangshan 1921); 521–524 from Shenhai Ry 52–55 in 1933 (built Baldwin 1927); 528–533 from Jichang Jidun Ry 101–106 in 1933 (built Tangshan 1911)
ソリサ; Sorisa	?	ソリ_; Sori_	501−508~	2-8-0	ALCo	>8		
ソリシ; Sorishi	6050–6051	ソリロ; Soriro	505–506	2-8-0	ALCo	2		Nationalised from Jichang Jidun Ry in 1933
ソリナ; Sorina	6200–6214	ソリイ; Sorii	501–515	2-8-0	ALCo	15		From Mantetsu 1933
ソリク; Soriku	? (total 33)	ソリサ; Sorisa	501–533	2-8-0	Beyer, Peacock & Company	33		13 from Mantetsu 1933, 20 from Mantetsu 1935
ソリチ; Sorichi	6280–6292	ソリサ; Sorisa	534–546	2-8-0	Shahekou	13		From Mantetsu 1935
-	-	ソリサ; Sorisa	547–561	2-8-0	Baldwin, Altoona Works	15		From PRR in 1938

==== Shunting Locomotives ====
Class	Numbers	Class	Numbers	Wheel arrangement	Builder	Total in class	Image	Notes
Pre-1938		1938-1945						
ダブイ; Dabui	?	ダブコ; Dabuko	506−5xx	2-6-4T	Kitson & Co.			Nationalised from ?
ダブニ; Dabuni	5440−5444	ダブコ; Dabuko	501−505	2-6-4T	Baldwin	5		Nationalised from Jihai Ry 801−805; leased to East Manchuria Ry
ダブコ; Dabuko	? (total 49)	ダブイ; Dabui	501–549	2-6-4T	ALCo	49		From Mantetsu 1933
ダブロ; Daburo	? (total 7)	(to NCTC)	-	2-10-2T	Škoda (6x); Kawasaki (1x)	7		Nationalised from North Manchuria Ry, class Ь, as MNR ダブA; converted to standard gauge => ダブロ; transferred to NCTC as Satai
エトイ; Etoi	? (total 13)	エトニ; Etoni	501−513	0-8-0	Bryansk, Kharkov	13		Nationalised from North Manchuria Ry, class O^{д}, as MNR エトA; 13 converted to standard gauge => エトイ
プレサ; Puresa	? (total 1); 55−57	プレシ; Pureshi	501; 505–507	2-6-2	Baldwin; Tangshan/North British	4		501 from Jinghan Ry in 1933 (built Baldwin 1919); 505–507 from Beining Ry in 1933 (built by North British, assembled by Tangshan)
プレシ; Pureshi	? (total 3)	プレイ; Purei	501–503	2-6-2	ALCo	3		From Mantetsu 1933
シカイ; Shikai	?	シカイ; Shikai	501−5xx	0-6-0T	Baldwin, Kolomna	?		Nationalised from North Manchuria Ry, class Ь^{а} and Ь^{к}, as MNR シカA; some converted to standard gauge => シカイ

==== Broad Gauge (ex Chinese Eastern Railway) ====
Class	Numbers	Class	Numbers	Wheel arrangement	Builder	Total in class	Image	Notes
MNR		CER						
ダブA; DabuA	?	Ь	4001−4007	2-10-2T	Škoda (6x); Kawasaki (1x)	7		Converted to standard gauge => ダブロ (Daburo) transferred to NCTC as Satai
デカA; DekaA	?	Е^{ф} Е^{с} Е^{л}	1–250; 251−350, 401−406; 501−925, 1126−1175	2-10-0	Baldwin; ALCo; ALCo, Baldwin	44 (total to CER)		Converted to standard gauge => デカニ (Dekani)
エトA; EtoA	?	O^{д}	701−733	0-8-0	Bryansk, Kharkov	33		13 converted to standard gauge => エトイ (Etoi)
シカA; ShikaA	?	Ь^{а} Ь^{к}		0-8-0	Baldwin; Kolomna	27 ?		Some converted to standard gauge => シカイ (Shikai)
ソリA; SoriA	?	Х	151−271	2-8-0	Baldwin	121		Originally CER class Б, class Х after 1912. Retired by 1945.
ソリB; SoriB	?	Ш	301−350	2-8-0	Bryansk	50		Bryansk Type 20. Retired by 1945.
ソリC; SoriC	?	Ц	101−128; 129−140; 141−150; 501−530	2-8-0	Bryansk	50		Bryansk Type 20. Retired by 1945.
テホA; TehoA	?	Г Г Г^{ч}	601−640; 651−695; 301−3xx	4-6-0	Bryansk; Kharkov; Bryansk, Kharkov	40; 45 ?		Some class Г rebuilt with superheaters => class Г^{ч}; Some class Г^{ч} converted to standard gauge => テホイ (Tehoi)

=== Passenger Railcars ===
Class	Numbers	Class	Numbers	Builder	In service	Total in class	Capacity	Weight	Engine	Transmission	Image	Notes
Pre-1938		1938-1945										
ケハ2; KeHa-2	10–14	キハ1; KiHa-1	201–205	Nippon Sharyō	1930	5	50	15.32t	Waukesha 6SRL petrol	mech		From Mantetsu in 1935–36.
コヤク2; KoYaKu-2	10–13	?	201–203	Nippon Sharyō	1930	5	50	15.32t	Mercedes-Benz diesel	mech		2nd class railcar.
國ジハ1; KokuJiHa-1	2101–2104	ケハ3; KeHa-3	202–205	Nippon Sharyō	1936	4	84 (summer); 78 (winter)	25.5t	Mitsubishi; Diesel	?		3rd class railcar. Body similar to KiHa-3 100-series.
國ジハ2; KokuJiHa-2	2201–2206	ケハ5; KeHa-5	201–206	Nippon Sharyō	1936	6	92 (summer); 86 (winter)	26.3t	Mitsubishi or Niigata Tekkō; Diesel	?		3rd class railcar.
國ジハ3; KokuJiHa-3	2301–2302	ケハ7; KeHa-7	201–202	?	1938	2	92 (summer); 86 (winter)	34.5t	150 hp Mitsubishi; Diesel	Hoyt hydraulic		Streamlined 2-car 3rd class DMU.
國ケハ1; KokuKeHa-1	102–130	キハ3; KiHa-3	200–228	Nippon Sharyō	1933	29	84 (summer); 78 (winter)	21.5t	Kawasaki KW127 petrol	mech		3rd class railcars. Assignments: Jingtu Line: 8 Labin Line: 6 Taike Line: 13; Chaokai Line: 2
國ケハ2; KokuKeHa-2	71	キハ3; KiHa-3	201	Nippon Sharyō	1933	1	73 (summer); 68 (winter)	22.5t	Waukesha 6RB petrol	mech		3rd class railcars with 7-person VIP room.
國ケハ3; KokuKeHa-3	72–73	キハ2; KiHa-2	201–202	Nippon Sharyō	1933	2	84 (summer); 78 (winter)	22.5t	petrol	mech		3rd class railcars with baggage compartment.
國ケハ4; KokuKeHa-4	201–203	キハ5; KiHa-5	201–203	Nippon Sharyō?	1935	3	92 (summer); 86 (winter)	26.5t	Kawasaki KP170 petrol	mech		3rd class railcars.

== Other businesses ==
The General Railway Administration, later the General Directorate of Railways, had several other transportation-related businesses in addition to the railway. Although Mantetsu undertook non-transport-related infrastructure projects such as electricity and urban planning, as well as management of coal mines, most were transportation-related businesses.

=== Bus transport ===
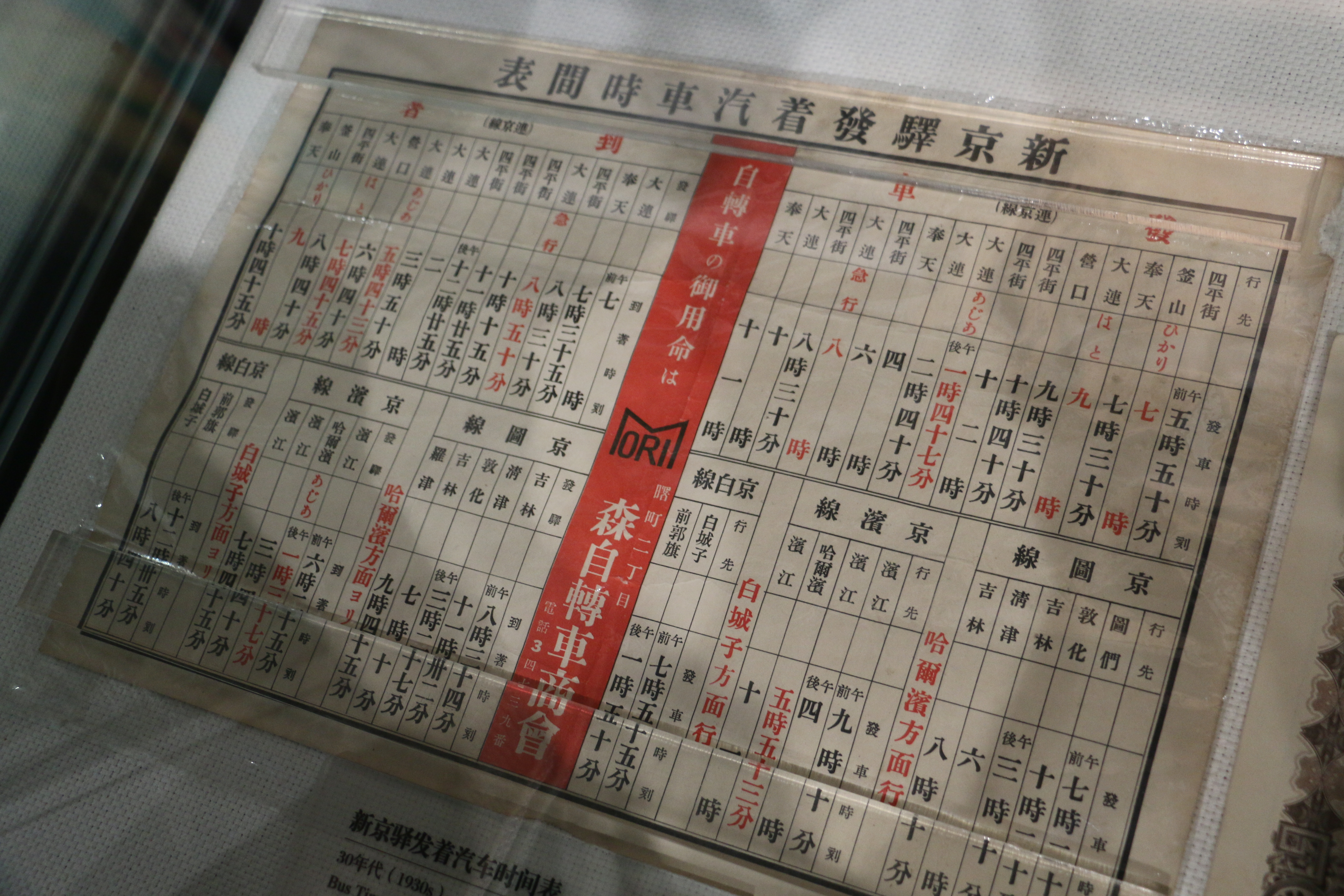
Xinjing Station bus timetable

When the National Railway was formed, there were no long-distance intercity bus services like the JNR Bus operations in Japan, only local city bus operations. However, both the Manchukuo government and the General Railway Administration felt it undesirable for private business to freely undertake transport services that might compete with the National Railway. As the railway had many economically unsound routes, it was felt that independently managed bus services could undermine the National Railway's promotional power and development capabilities, and this was considered detrimental to the country's interests. Therefore, when the Manchukuo government decided on its national highway plan in 1933, it determined which possible bus routes could potentially compete with the railway. It was decided that those routes, and those important to national security, would be managed by the National Railway, leaving the other, non-threatening, routes available for private undertakings. Consequently, each railway bureau launched intercity bus services on the national highways.

On 1 March of that year the General Railway Administration established its Bus Department, and on 20 March the Fengshan Railway Bureau launched the first National Railway intercity bus service between Beipiao and Chaoyang. The route network was gradually expanded, and by the end of September there were bus services all over Rehe Province. Following this expansion, on 19 September the Bus Department became an independent entity. As national road construction progressed, a nationwide network of intercity bus services was planned, which was to include the Kwantung Leased Territory.

However, expansion proved difficult. The first problem was that of poor roads. Although they were called "national highways", many of these roads were unpaved, becoming muddy and unpassable in times of heavy rain and during the spring thaw, while in dry periods they were very dusty and hard on tires. Also, due to the nature of Manchuria, the population was primarily clustered in cities, with the intervening areas being very sparsely populated, which made it difficult to increase earnings. Furthermore, for routes travelling through remote areas, security guards were needed on the busses and at stations, which incurred extra personnel expenses. However, by 1936 most railway stations also served as bus stations, and by 1939 there were over 20,000 km (12,000 mi) of bus routes.

=== Water transport and port operations ===
An unusual side business of the National Railway was water transport consisting of riverine ferries up and down the Songhua, Amur and Ussuri rivers. Trips could last anywhere from 3 to 11 days in duration. Following the Mukden Incident riverine transport was almost completely stopped, but in 1933 the General Railway Administration started a river ferry service between Harbin and Mohe, and others were subsequently added. The National Railway also operated a number of riverine ports related to its water transport operations, as well as sea ports at Huludao and Hebei.
