= Nihezi railway station =

Railway station in Jinzhou, Liaoning, China

Nihezi railway station is a level-four railway station located in Qianyang Township, Yi County, Jinzhou, Liaoning on the Jinzhou–Chengde railway. It is under the jurisdiction of China Railway Shenyang Group.
