= Yixian railway station =

Railway station in Yi County, Liaoning

Yixian 义县
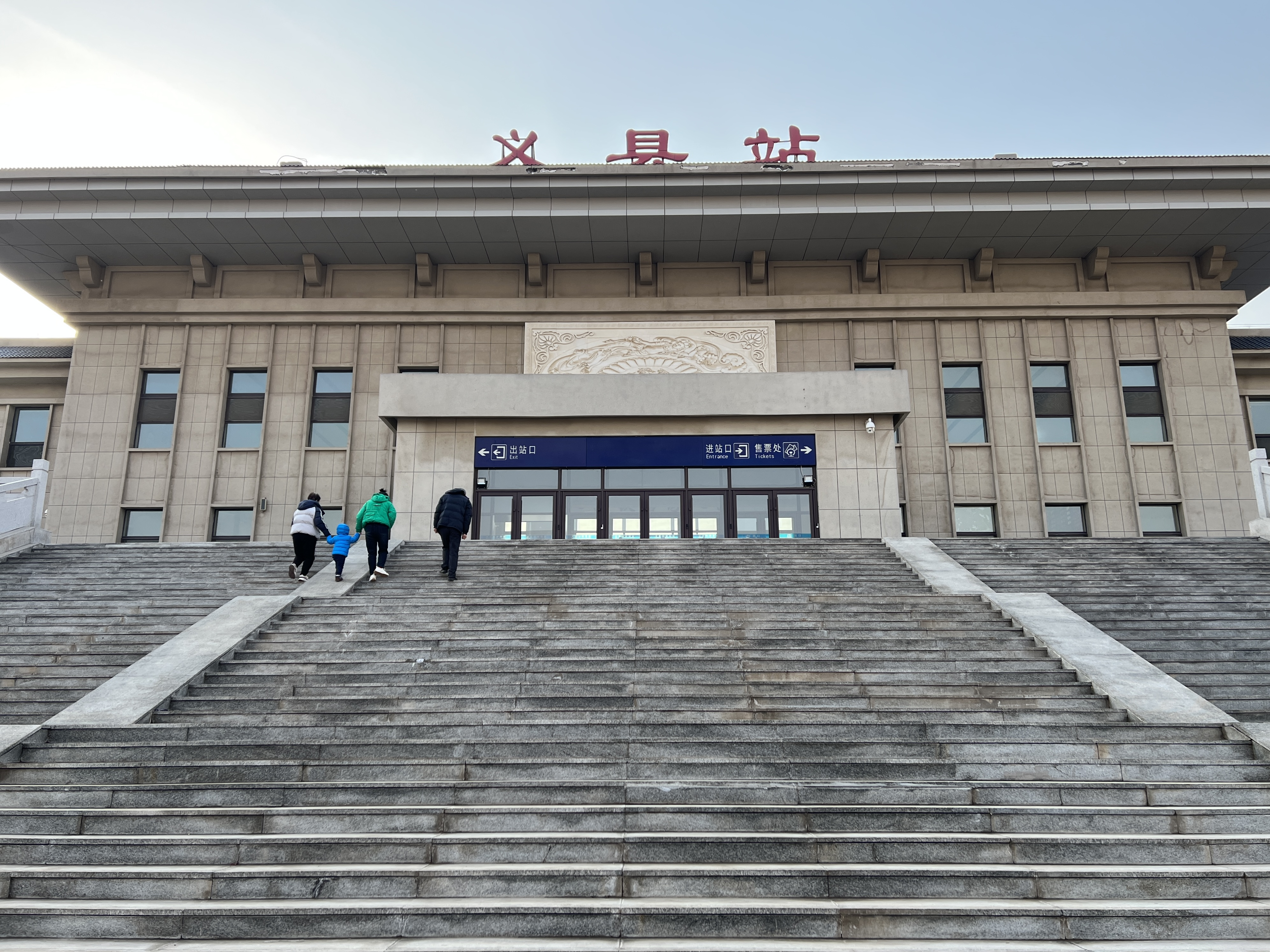

General information
- Location: Yizhou town, Yi County, Jinzhou, Liaoning; China
- Coordinates: 41.5201°N 121.2229°E
- Operator: China Railway Shenyang Group
- Lines: Xinlitun–Yixian railway; Jinzhou–Chengde railway

History
- Opened: 1921; 105 years ago
Location

Yixian railway station (Chinese: 义县) is a third-class railway station in Yizhou town, Yi County, Jinzhou, Liaoning. It is located on the Xinlitun–Yixian railway and Jinzhou–Chengde railway. It was built in 1921 and is under the jurisdiction of China Railway Shenyang Group.
