= Bajiaotai railway station =

Railway station in Linghai, China

Coordinates: 41.2859°N 121.2443°E

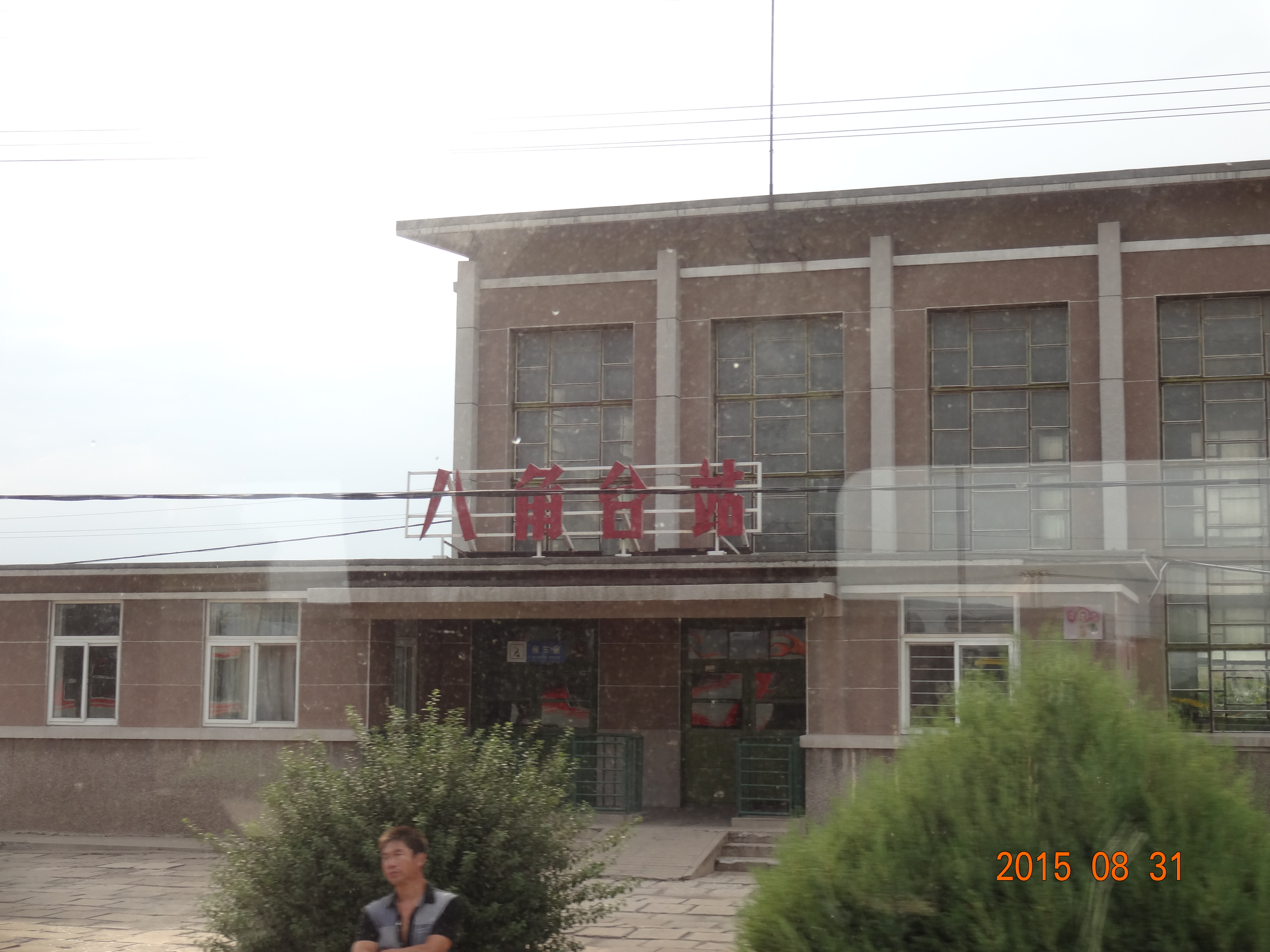
Bajiaotai railway station

Bajiaotai railway station is a third-class railway station in Xinlong Subdistrict, Linghai, Jinzhou, Liaoning on the Jinzhou–Chengde railway. It was built in 1921. It is under the jurisdiction of China Railway Shenyang Group.
