= SL-11 =

SL-11, SL11, or SL 11 may refer to:

- Schütte-Lanz SL 11, a German military dirigible
- Karosa ŠL 11, a Czech intercity bus, produced from 1970-1981
- Tsyklon-2, a Soviet and Russian rocket, used from 1969-2006
- Tsyklon, a Soviet rocket, used from 1967-1969
- London Buses route SL11
- China Railways SL11, a type of steam locomotive
- (35085) 1990 SL11, a minor planet
- SL 11 (TX), a highway loop in Texas
