= SL-8 =

SL-8 or SL8 may refer to:

- Kosmos 3 rocket, type 65S3, used from 1966-1968
- Kosmos 1 rocket, type 11K65, used from 1964-1965
- Heckler & Koch SL8, a semi-automatic rifle
- China Railways SL8, a class of steam locomotives operated from 1937-1980
- London Buses route SL8
- SL8, a postcode district in the SL postcode area in the United Kingdom
