= Russian locomotive class Kh =

Russian Railways class Х Chinese Eastern Railway class Х Manchukuo National SoriA Class(ソリA)
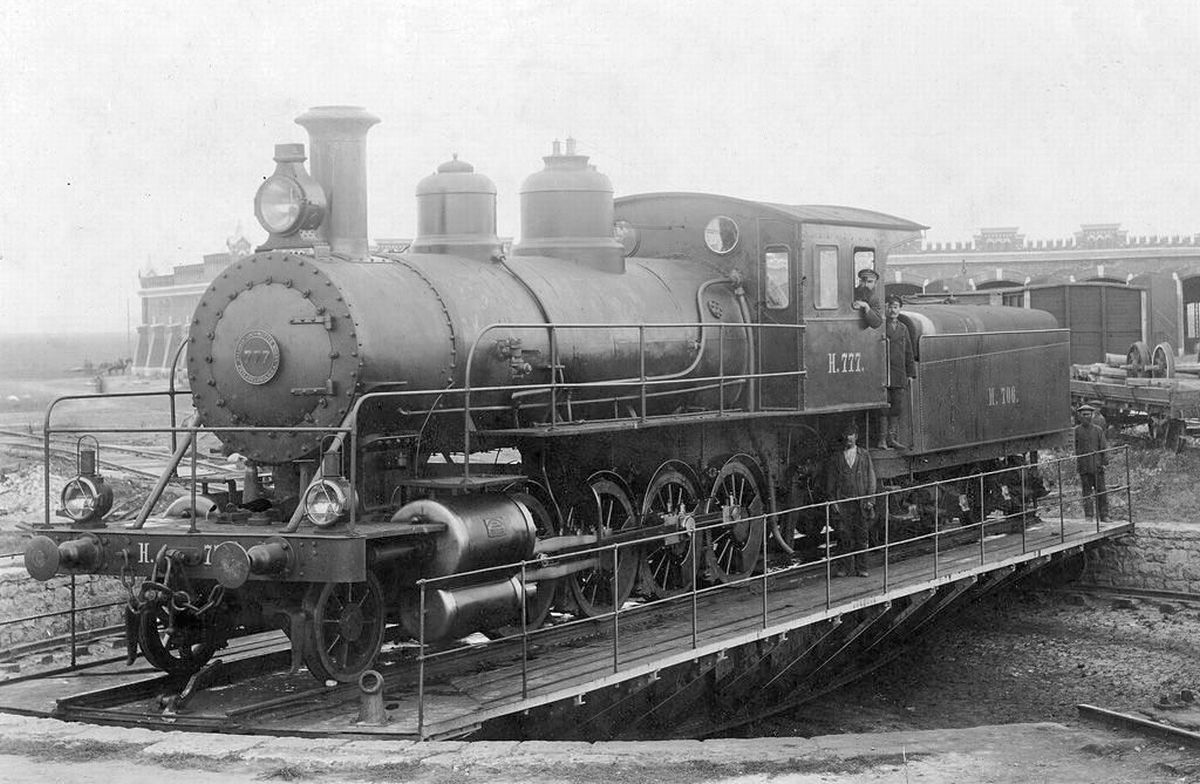
- A class Х steam locomotive on the Vladikavkaz Railway
Type and origin
- Power type: Steam
- Builder: Baldwin Locomotive Works
- Build date: 1895, 1898−1900
Specifications
- Configuration
  - Whyte: 2-8-0
  - UIC: 1'D h2g
- Gauge: 1,524 mm (5 ft 0 in)
- Leading dia.: 915 mm (3 ft 0 in)
- Driver dia.: 1,270 mm (50.000 in)
- Length: 10,443 mm (34 ft 3.14 in)
- Loco weight: 66,300 kg (146,200 lb)
- Fuel type: Coal
- Boiler pressure: 12 kg/cm^{2} (170 lbf/in^{2})
- Cylinders: Two, outside
Career
- Operators: Russian Railway; Chinese Eastern Railway; Manchukuo National Railway
- Class: RR: Х CER: Б → Х MNR: ソリA
- Number in class: 235(Russian Railway); 121(Chinese Eastern Railway)
- Withdrawn: 1955 (in USSR); 1945 (in China)
- Preserved: Х180 at Changchun, China
- Disposition: Most scrapped, one preserved

The Russian class Х (Kh) was an early type of Russian steam locomotive. Between 1895 and 1900, 235 were built by the Baldwin Locomotive Works of the United States. Some locomotives were modernized in the early 1900s, fitted with superheaters and compound cylinders. Russian Railways designated them Х^{п} class. (ru)

Engines of the Х^{м} (Murmansk) sub-class were built and sent to Russia during the Allied intervention in the Russian Civil War between 1915 and 1916, and transferred to the Murmansk Railway after the war. These engines were of the same wheel arrangement as the class X, and also built in the U.S. However, they were built by H.K. Porter, Inc. rather than Baldwin and were otherwise very different from the X class.

In 1923, there were still 127 steam locomotives of the Х series (including the Х^{м}) still in service. By 1940, the number was reduced to 26 engines, and the last of the class was retired in 1955.

== CER class Х and MNR ソリA (SoriA) class ==
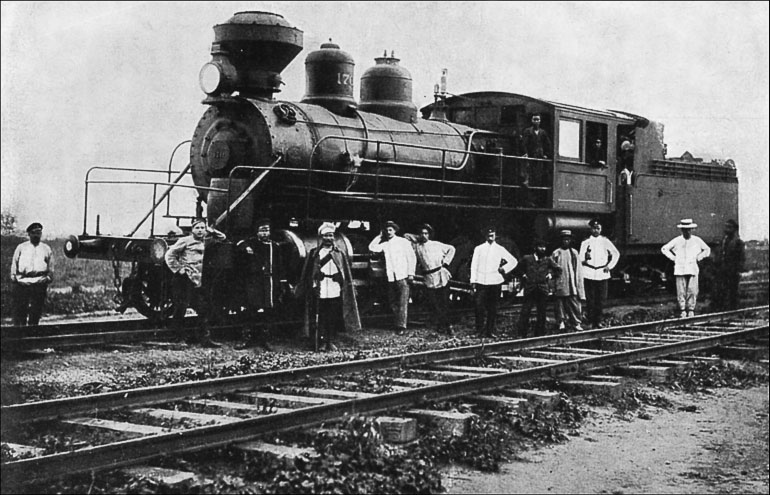
CER locomotive Х176

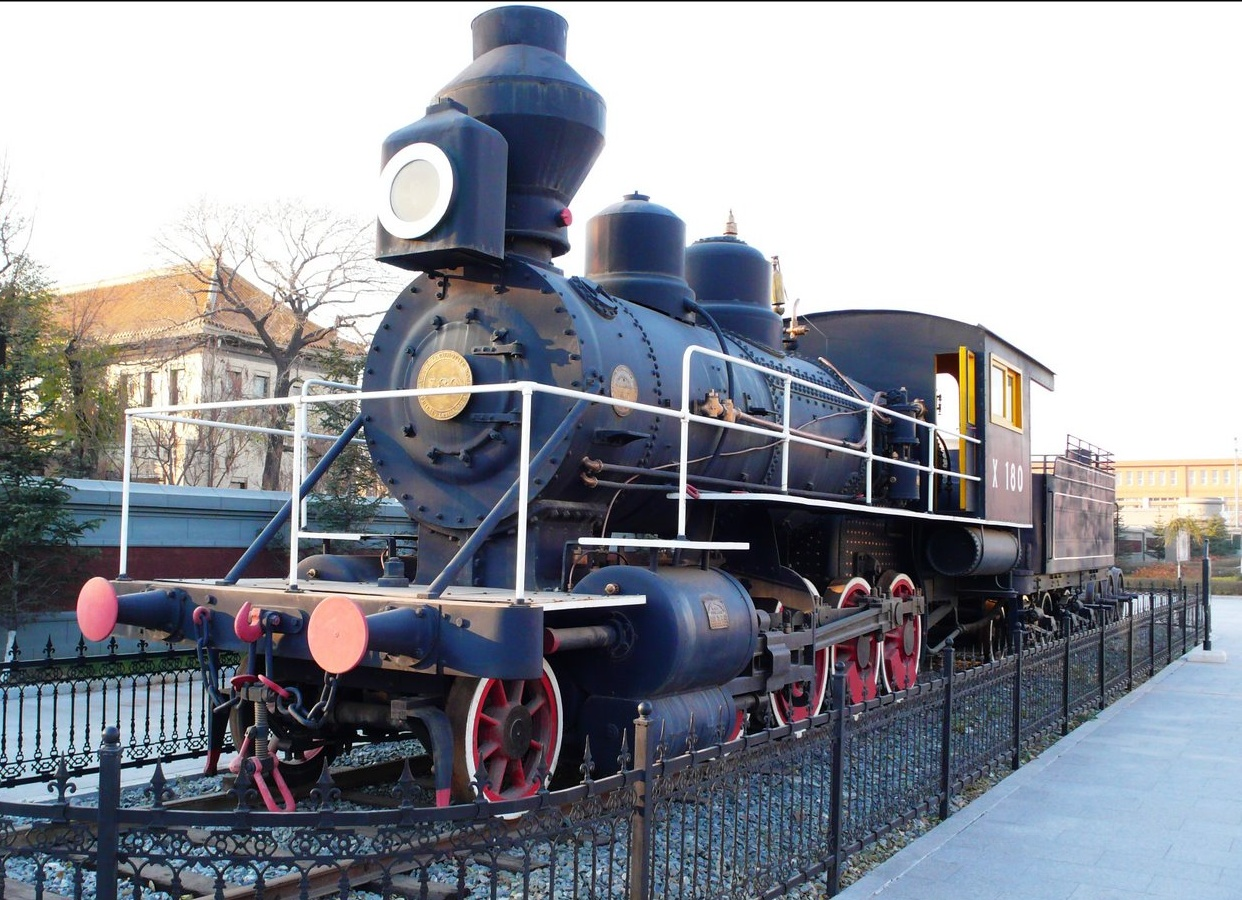
Preserved CER Х class no. 180 on display at the Imperial Palace.

The Chinese Eastern Railway also bought Baldwin-built locomotives identical to those of the Russian Railways' Х class; Baldwin's works designation for these locomotives was 10.22/42E. Originally designated class Б (B) by the CER, Baldwin in Philadelphia built fifty in 1898 (Б151-Б200), forty in 1899 (Б201-Б240), and a final batch of 31 in 1900 (Б241-Б271). They were redesignated class Х (Kh) in 1921 and numbered Х151 through Х271.

After the Japanese established the puppet state of Manchukuo, the Soviet Union sold its share of the North Manchuria Railway, as the CER had been renamed in 1932, to the new state's government on 23 March 1935, It was then merged into the state-owned Manchukuo National Railway, which designated these locomotives ソリA (SoriA) class. Not all of the CER's Х-class engines went to the MNR; some ended up in service in the USSR around Vladivostok. And retired 1945 in china.

In 2005, an X Locomotive was found buried in Lalin River, Jilin Province, China. This engine, no. 180, was excavated, restored, and is on display outside the Museum of the Imperial Palace of the Manchu State, Changchun.
