= China Railways JF15 =

China Railways JF15 (解放15) Manchukuo National Mikana class (ミカナ)
Type and origin
- Power type: Steam
- Builder: American Locomotive Company
- Build date: 1928−1929
- Total produced: 6
Specifications
- Configuration
  - Whyte: 2-8-2
- Gauge: 1,435 mm (4 ft 8 1/2 in)
- Driver dia.: 1,321 mm (4 ft 4.0 in)
- Length: 20,269 mm (66 ft 6.0 in)
- Total weight: 135.17 t (133.04 long tons)
- Fuel type: Coal
- Cylinders: Two, outside
- Cylinder size: 508 mm × 711 mm (20.0 in × 28.0 in)
Career
- Operators: Jihai Railway; Manchukuo National Railway; China Railway
- Class: MNR: ミカサ (1933−1938); MNR: ミカナ (1938−1945); CR: ㄇㄎ15 (1951−1959); CR: 解放15 (1959–end)
- Number in class: 6
- Numbers: MNR: ミカナ517−ミカナ522; CR: ?
- Retired: 1990
- Disposition: All scrapped

The China Railways JF15 (解放15, Jiěfàng, "liberation") class steam locomotive was a class of 2-8-2 "Mikado" type steam locomotives operated by the China Railway, built by the American Locomotive Company in the United States in 1928−1929.

These locomotives were originally built for the Jihai Railway. After the Japanese established the puppet state of Manchukuo, these and other privately owned railways in the territory of Manchukuo were nationalised to create the Manchukuo National Railway, which designated these the Mikasa (ミカサ) class, becoming Mikana (ミカナ) class after the classification reform of 1938.

After the end of the Pacific War, these locomotives were passed on to the Republic of China Railway. After the establishment of the People's Republic of China, China Railways designated them ㄇㄎ15 (MK15) class in 1951, and subsequently 解放15 (JF15) class in 1959. This class retired 1990.

== Bibliography ==
- Whitehouse, Patrick Bruce (1988). China By Rail. London: Stanley Paul. ISBN 9780091737092 – via Internet Archive.
