= China Railways JF5 =

Class of steam locomotives

China Railways JF_{5} (解放_{5}) Jichang Railway 500 class Manchukuo National Mikana class (ミカナ)
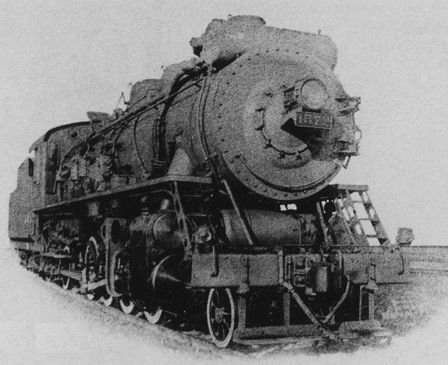
- North China Transport ミカコ1572
Type and origin
- Power type: Steam
- Builder: Kawasaki; Kisha Seizo
- Build date: 1923
Specifications
- Configuration
  - Whyte: 2-8-2
- Gauge: 1,435 mm (4 ft 8 1/2 in)
- Driver dia.: 1,370 mm (4 ft 6 in)
- Length: 19,965 mm (65 ft 6.0 in)
- Width: 3,150 mm (10 ft 4 in)
- Height: 4,315 mm (14 ft 1.9 in)
- Loco weight: 81.28 t (80.00 long tons)
- Tender weight: 50.80 t (50.00 long tons)
- Total weight: 132.08 t (129.99 long tons)
- Fuel type: Coal
- Firebox
  - Grate area: 3.92 m^{2} (42.2 sq ft)
- Boiler pressure: 12.7 kgf/cm^{2} (181 psi)
- Heating surface: 270.52 m^{2} (2,911.9 sq ft)
- Cylinders: Two, outside
- Cylinder size: 570 mm × 660 mm (22.441 in × 25.984 in)
Career
- Operators: Jichang Jidun Railway, Manchukuo National Railway; China Railway
- Class: MNR: ミカナ (1933−1938); MNR: ミカナ (1938−1945); CR: ㄇㄎ_{5} (1951−1959), CR: 解放_{5} (1959–end)
- Number in class: 16
- Numbers: Jichang: 501−516; MNR: ミカナ 6540−6555 (Mikana); MNR: ミカナ 501−516 (Mikana); CR: JF_{5} 2901−2916
- Retired: 1990
- Preserved: JF 5-522
- Disposition: 1 preserved, remainder scrapped

The China Railways JF_{5} (解放_{5}, Jiěfàng, "liberation") class steam locomotive was a class of 2-8-2 "Mikado" type steam locomotives operated by the China Railway, originally built by Kawasaki in Japan in 1923 for the Jichang Railway.

== History ==
In 1923, sixteen D50 class locomotives were exported to the Jichang Jidun Railway in Manchuria, which designated them class 500 and numbered 501 through 516. Ten were built by Kawasaki (works nos. 970−971, 1140−1170) and six by Kisha Seizō (w/n 965−970), and though very similar to the Japanese D50 class, there were some slight differences in dimensions due to the larger loading gauge on Chinese lines.

After the establishment of Manchukuo, the Jichang Jidun Railway was nationalised along with other private railways to form the Manchukuo National Railway. These locomotives were classified by MNR to Mikana (シカナ) class, numbered 6540−6555, renumbered 501−516 in 1938.

== Postwar ==
After the end of the Pacific War, these locomotives were passed on to the Republic of China Railway. After the establishment of the People's Republic of China, China Railways designated them ㄇㄎ_{5} (MK_{5}) class in 1951, and subsequently 解放_{5} (JF_{5}) class in 1959.

The last of these locomotives were retired in 1990.
