= China Railways JF18 =

China Railways JF18 (解放18) Manchukuo National Mikana class (ミカナ)
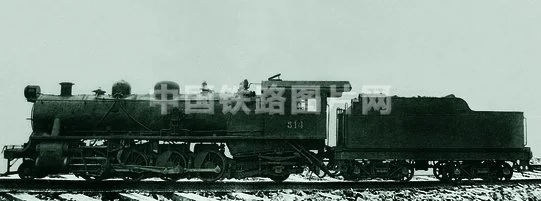
Type and origin
- Power type: Steam
- Builder: American Locomotive Company
- Build date: 1914
Specifications
- Configuration
  - Whyte: 2-8-2
- Gauge: 1,435 mm (4 ft 8 1/2 in)
- Driver dia.: 1,270 mm (4 ft 2 in)
- Length: 20,406 mm (66 ft 11.4 in)
- Fuel type: Coal
- Cylinders: Two, outside
Career
- Operators: Manchukuo National Railway; China Railway
- Class: MNR: ミカイ (1933−1938); MNR: ミカナ (1938−1945); CR: ㄇㄎ18 (1951−1959); CR: 解放18 (1959–end)
- Numbers: MNR: ミカナ523−ミカナ5xx
- Retired: 1975
- Disposition: All scrapped

The China Railways JF18 (解放18, Jiěfàng, "liberation") class steam locomotive was a class of 2-8-2 "Mikado" type steam locomotives operated by the China Railway, built by the American Locomotive Company in the United States in 1914.

The original owner of these locomotives is unknown. After the Japanese established the puppet state of Manchukuo, the privately owned railways in the territory of Manchukuo were nationalised to create the Manchukuo National Railway, which designated these the Mikai (ミカイ) class, becoming Mikana (ミカナ) class after the classification reform of 1938.

After the end of the Pacific War, these locomotives were passed on to the Republic of China Railway. After the establishment of the People's Republic of China, China Railways designated them ㄇㄎ18 (MK18) class in 1951. They were subsequently redesignated 解放18 (JF18) class in 1959, and were retired by 1975.

== Bibliography ==
- Whitehouse, Patrick Bruce (1988). China By Rail. London: Stanley Paul. ISBN 9780091737092 – via Internet Archive.
