= China Railways SL11 =

China Railways SL11 (勝利11) Mantetsu Pashii class (パシイ)
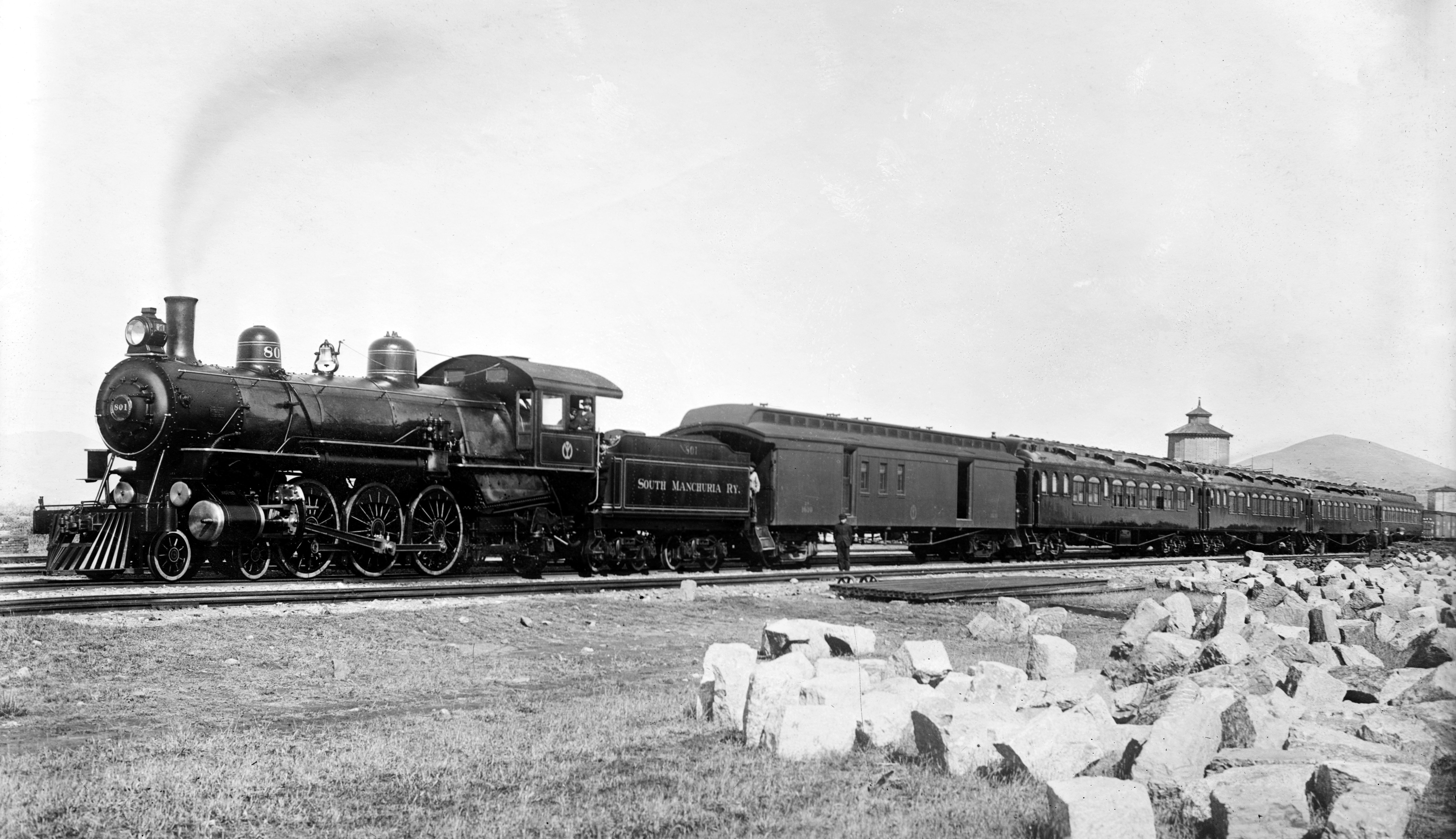
- パシイ-801
Type and origin
- Power type: Steam
- Builder: American Locomotive Company Richmond works
- Build date: 1908
- Total produced: 7
- Rebuilder: South Manchuria Ry. Shahekou Works
- Rebuild date: 1920–1926
Specifications
- Configuration
  - Whyte: 4-6-2
- Gauge: 1,435 mm (4 ft 8 1/2 in)
- Driver dia.: 1,753 mm (69.0 in) (orig.); 1,750 mm (69 in) (rebuilt)
- Adhesive weight: Original: 54.10 t (53.25 long tons); Rebuilt: 57.70 t (56.79 long tons)
- Loco weight: Original: 89.50 t (88.09 long tons); Rebuilt: 89.91 t (88.49 long tons)
- Fuel type: Coal
- Firebox
  - Grate area: Original: 5.11 m^{2} (55.0 sq ft); Rebuilt: 4.61 m^{2} (49.6 sq ft)
- Boiler pressure: Original: 14.0 kgf/cm^{2} (199 psi); Rebuilt: 14.1 kgf/cm^{2} (201 psi)
- Cylinders: Two, outside
- Cylinder size: 508 mm × 660 mm (20.0 in × 26.0 in)
Career
- Operators: South Manchuria Railway; Manchukuo National Railway; China Railway
- Class: SMR: G (1908–1920); SMR: パシイ (1920–1945); MNR: パシコ (1933–1938); MNR: パシイ (1938–1945); CR: ㄆㄒ11 (1951–1959); CR: 勝利11 (1959–)
- Number in class: 7
- Numbers: SMR: 800–806 (1908–1938); SMR: パシイ1 (1938–1945); MNR: 5900–5906 (1933–1938); MNR: パシコ501-506; CR: ?

The China Railways SL11 (勝利11, Shènglì, "victory") class steam locomotive was a class of 4-6-2 "Pacific" type steam locomotives operated by the China Railway. They were originally built for the South Manchuria Railway and the Manchukuo National Railway by ALCO of the United States in 1908, and have the distinction of being part of the first group of standard gauge locomotives to operate in northeastern China.

== History ==
The first Pacifics to be delivered to Mantetsu were the seven class "G" locomotives built by ALCO at their Richmond works. These were part of the first group of locomotives bought by Mantetsu after conversion to standard gauge. They entered service in 1908, hauling express trains made up of Pullman cars between Dalian and Changchun put into service that year. These trains originally ran twice weekly, but were later increased to three, then four, trips each week, though during the First World War service was reduced to one train per week. These locomotives were occasionally used for mixed trains on the Anfeng Line.

Between 1920 and 1926 they were rebuilt with superheaters, but with the arrival of newer types - and the increase in passenger traffic - they came to be used on all sorts of passenger trains on the trunk lines. Immediately after the Mukden Incident four were lent out to another railway. In 1933, six were transferred to the Manchukuo National Railway, where they were used on the construction of new lines, along with regular passenger duties. Due to the axleload of the Pashina class being too heavy for use on the mainline north of Xinjing (Changchun), after the extension of the Asia Express to Harbin in 1935, the Pashii class was used on the Xinjing–Harbin section, which was formally owned by the MNR.

In the 1920 classification system they were designated Pashii class (パシイ); those transferred to the MNR in 1933 were reclassified Pashiko (パシコ) class. In the unified classification scheme of 1938 they returned to the Pashii designation.

Owner	Class & numbers (pre-1920)	Class & numbers (1920–1938)	Class & numbers (1938–1945)	Builder
Mantetsu	G 800–806	パシイ800–パシイ806	パシイ1	ALCO
Manchukuo National		パシコ5900–パシコ5906 (from 1933)	パシイ501–パシイ506	ALCO

== Postwar ==
Of the seven Pashii class locomotives, at the end of the Pacific War six were assigned to the Jinzhou Railway Bureau and one was on loan to another railway. All seven eventually ended up with the China Railway, becoming class ㄆㄒ11 (PX11) in 1951, and class SL11 in 1959.

== Bibliography ==
- Whitehouse, Patrick Bruce (1988). China By Rail. London: Stanley Paul. ISBN 9780091737092 – via Internet Archive.
