= China Railways SL8 =

China Railways SL8 (勝利8) Mantetsu Pashiha class (パシハ)
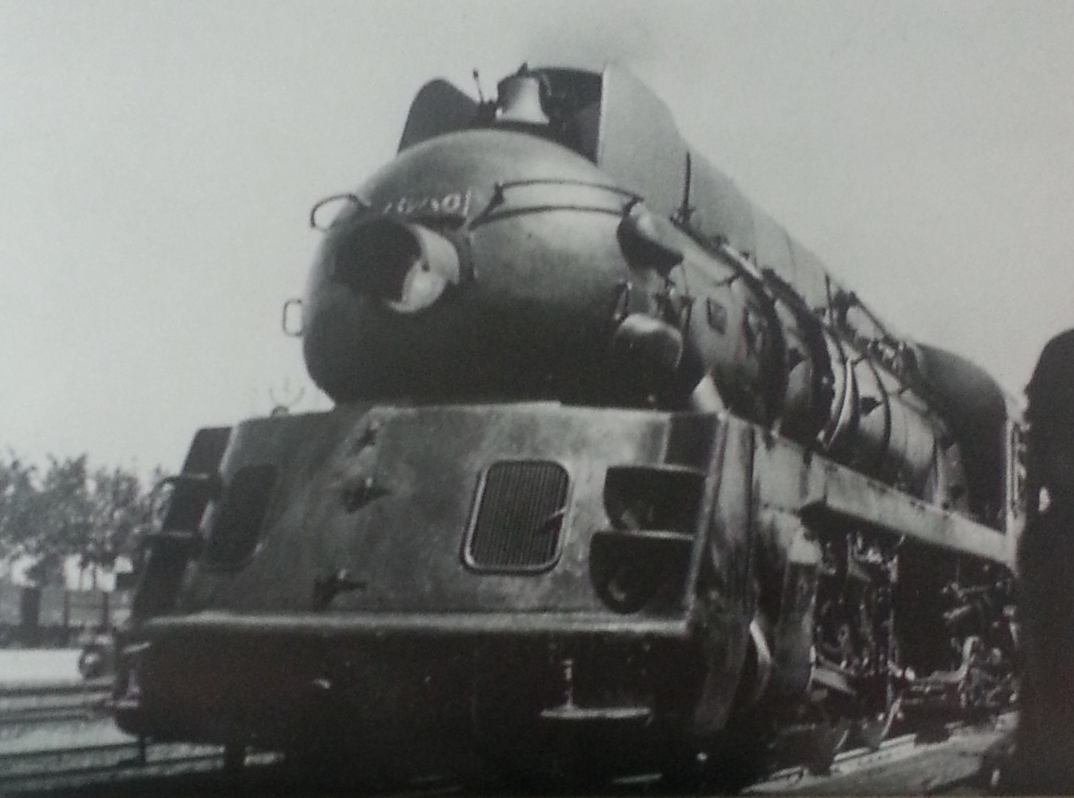
- South Manchuria Railway パシハ6 in 1938
Type and origin
- Power type: Steam
- Builder: South Manchuria Ry. Shahekou Works; Hitachi
- Build date: 1937–1940
- Total produced: 17
Specifications
- Configuration
  - Whyte: 4-6-2
- Gauge: 1,435 mm (4 ft 8 1/2 in)
- Driver dia.: 1,850 mm (73 in)
- Length: 24,705 mm (972.6 in)
- Width: 3,201 mm (126.0 in)
- Height: 4,789 mm (188.5 in)
- Adhesive weight: 68.57 t (67.49 long tons)
- Loco weight: 114.91 t (113.10 long tons)
- Tender weight: 85.00 t (83.66 long tons)
- Fuel type: Coal
- Fuel capacity: 15.00 t (14.76 long tons)
- Water cap.: 35.00 m^{3} (1,236 cu ft)
- Firebox
  - Grate area: 5.36 m^{2} (57.7 sq ft)
- Boiler
  - Small tubes: 93 x 51 mm (2.0 in)
  - Large tubes: 90 x 108 mm (4.3 in)
- Boiler pressure: 14.5 kgf/cm^{2} (206 psi)
- Heating surface
  - Firebox: 28.71 m^{2} (309.0 sq ft)
  - Tubes: 225.86 m^{2} (2,431.1 sq ft)
  - Total surface: 340.37 m^{2} (3,663.7 sq ft)
- Superheater
  - Type: Schmidt type E
  - Heating area: 85.80 m^{2} (923.5 sq ft)
- Cylinders: Two, outside
- Cylinder size: 600 mm × 710 mm (24 in × 28 in)
- Valve gear: Walschaerts
Performance figures
- Tractive effort: 167.0 kN (37,500 lb_{f})
Career
- Operators: South Manchuria Railway; Manchukuo National Railway; China Railway
- Class: SMR/MNR: パシハ; CR: ㄆㄒ八 (1951–1959); CR: 勝利8 (1959–end)
- Number in class: 17
- Numbers: SMR: 811–816 (1933–1938); SMR: パシハ1–16 (1938–1945); MNR: パシハ501; CR: 801–817
- Preserved: 815
- Current owner: Shenyang Railway Museum
- Disposition: One preserved, remainder scrapped

The China Railways SL8 (勝利8, Shènglì, "victory") class steam locomotive was a class of 4-6-2 "Pacific" type steam locomotives operated by the China Railway. They were originally built for the South Manchuria Railway (Mantetsu) and the Manchukuo National Railway between 1937 and 1940.

== History ==
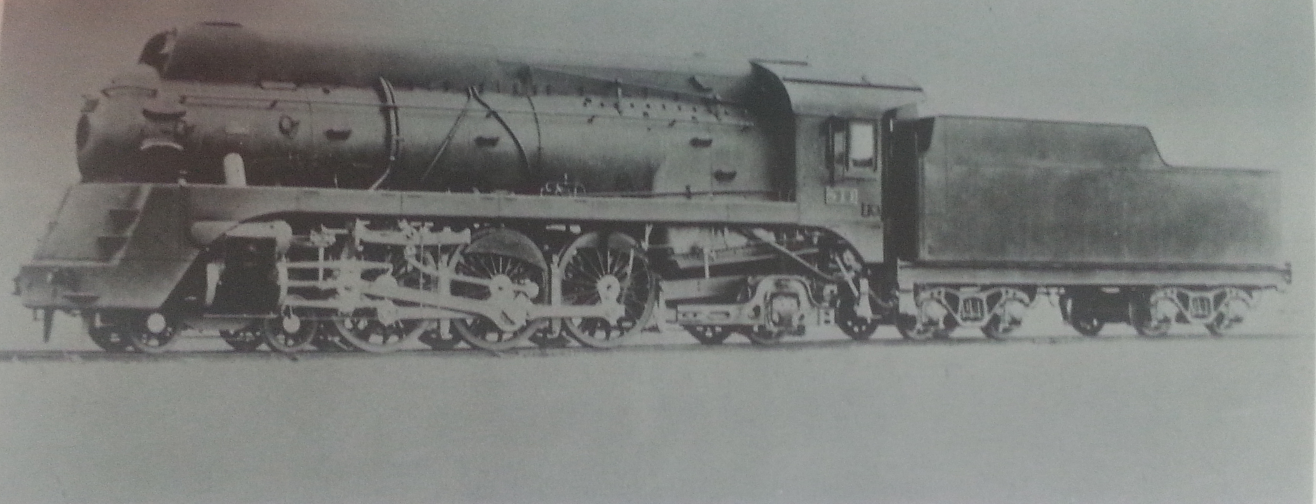
Builder's photo of South Manchuria Railway locomotive パシハ811

The Pashiha class locomotives were designed as a replacement for the Pashiko class on high-speed passenger trains. The most advanced steam locomotives in Manchuria, they had a semi-streamlined body, and used SKF roller bearings on all axles of both the locomotive and the tender, which improved both operational efficiency and ease of maintenance. They also had a combustion chamber firebox, a Schmidt type E superheater, a feedwater heater and an automatic stoker.

Initially used for pulling trains such as the "Hato" express between Dalian and Xinjing, they were later used to haul long-distance passenger trains between Xinjing and Andong on the Andong Line after its track was doubled. One unit was built for the Manchukuo National Railway for use with Emperor Puyi's train. The first six were built for Mantetsu by Hitachi in Japan in 1937, which were followed by another ten of an improved design from the Shahekou Works in 1940. Shahekou also built the single unit for the Manchukuo National in 1940.

Originally numbered パシハ811–パシハ816, they were renumbered パシナ1–パシナ6 in Mantetsu's 1938 general renumbering, and subsequent units were numbered in this sequence.

Owner	Class & numbers (1937–1938)	Class & numbers (1938–1945)	Builder	Year	Notes
Mantetsu	パシハ811–パシハ815	パシハ1–パシハ5	Hitachi	1937	
Mantetsu	パシハ816	パシハ6	Hitachi	1937	Boxpok wheels
Mantetsu	-	パシハ7–パシハ16	Shahekou Works	1940	Improved version; Boxpok wheels
Manchukuo National	-	パシハ501	Shahekou Works	1940	Boxpok wheels

== Postwar ==
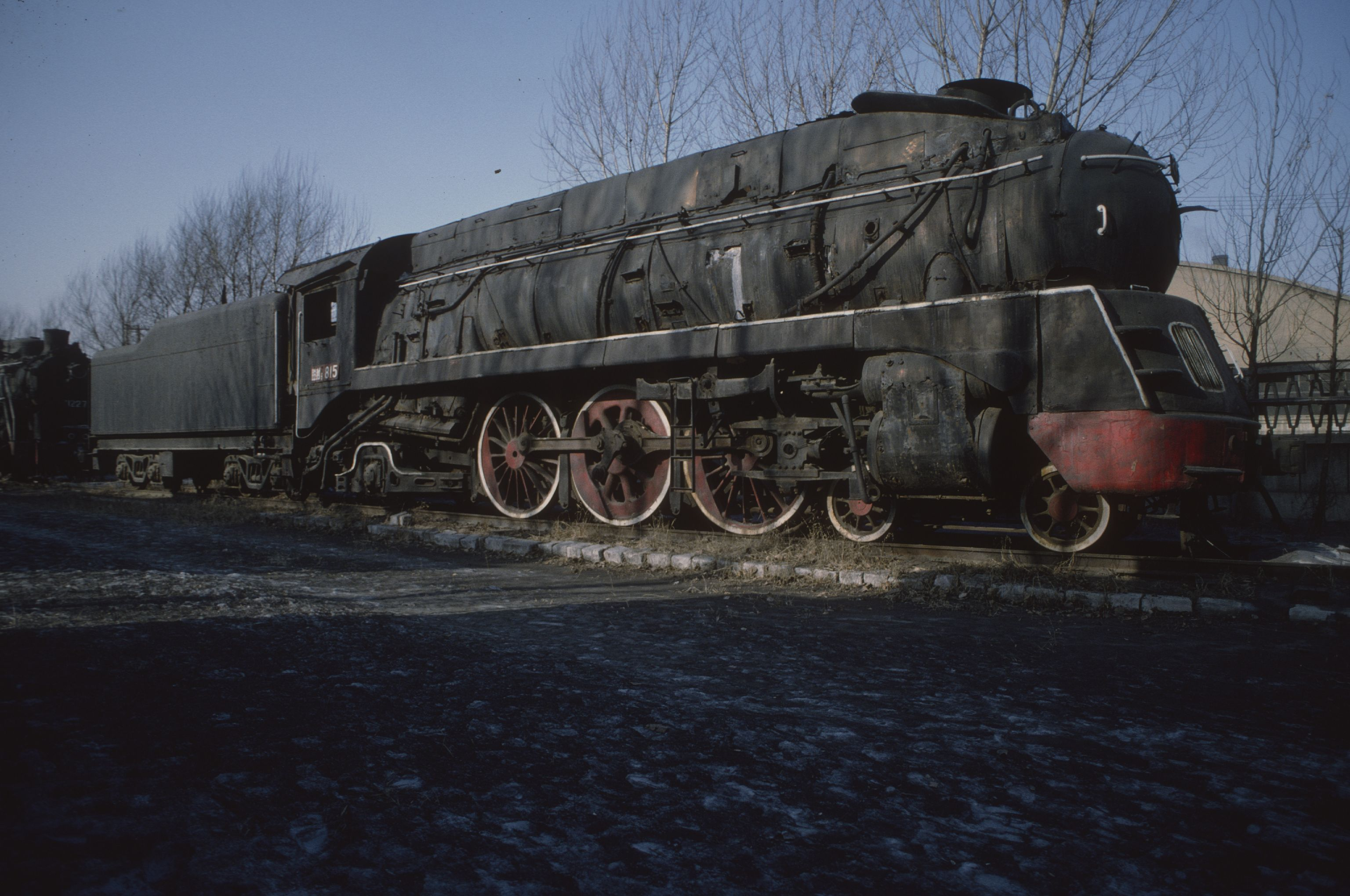
SL8-815 at the Shenyang Railway Museum

At the end of the Second Sino-Japanese War, the sixteen Mantetsu locomotives were assigned to the Dalian depot, while the Manchukuo National's single engine was assigned to the Fengtian Railway Bureau; all seventeen were passed on to the Republic of China Railway. After the establishment of the People's Republic and the current China Railway, they were designated class ㄆㄒ八 (PX8) in 1951, becoming class SL8 (勝利, Shènglì, "victory") in 1959; they were numbered 801 through 817. One SL8 was dedicated to pulling Mao Zedong's train. Five are known to have still been in service around 1980, around Beijing and Zhengzhou. SL8 815 is preserved at the Shenyang Steam Locomotive Museum.
