= Jinzhou–Chengde railway =

Railway line in China

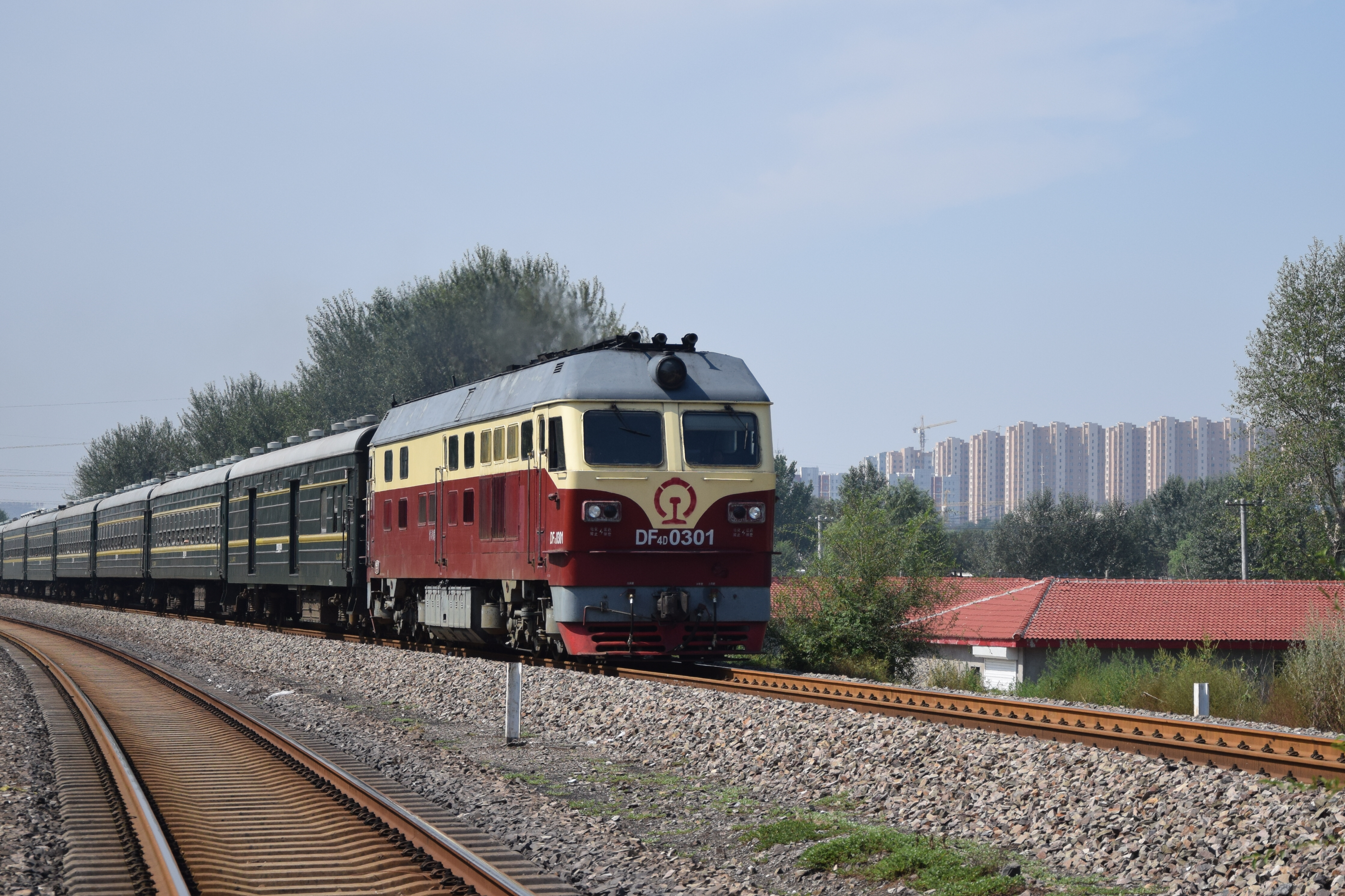

Overview
- Native name: 锦承铁路
- Status: Operational
- Termini: Shangbencheng; Jinzhou

Service
- Type: Heavy rail

Technical
- Track gauge: 1,435 mm (4 ft 8 1/2 in) standard gauge
- Electrification: 50 Hz 25,000 V
- Operating speed: 120 km/h (75 mph)

The Jinzhou–Chengde railway is a passenger and freight railway line in China. It is used by trains carrying coal from Inner Mongolia to ports in Liaoning for export.

== History ==
A new double-tracked section between Yebaishou station in Jianping County and Chaoyang South station in Shuangta District was opened on 24 December 2019, bypassing the original single-track alignment.

The section between Jinzhou and Chaoyang South was also upgraded. The intermediate stations Zhoujiatun, Nanling, Beipao South, Nenjia, Dayingzi, and Dongdadao were closed as part of the project, which saw the line speed increased from 100 kilometres per hour (62 mph) to 120 kilometres per hour (75 mph).

== Incident ==
On 12 April 2020, a passenger train travelling at 50 kilometres per hour (31 mph) from Chifeng South to Shanhaiguan derailed in Chaoyang City. No casualties were reported, and the line was reopened the following day.
