= Rolling stock of the South Manchuria Railway =

The South Manchuria Railway operated a wide variety of locomotives and powered railcars, as well as non-powered passenger and freight cars, initially of foreign (primarily American) manufacture, but later almost all equipment was manufactured in Japan and Manchukuo.

== Classification system ==
The Mantetsu main line was originally built by the Russians to 1,524 mm Russian gauge. During the Russo-Japanese War it was rebuilt by the Imperial Japanese Army to 1,067 mm Cape gauge as used in Japan, and rolling stock from Japan was used on the line. Additionally, the Anpo Line from Andong on the Korea-Manchuria border to Fengtian was also initially a narrow-gauge railway built by the army during the Russo-Japanese War. Thus, after the South Manchuria Railway began operation in 1907, it used the narrow-gauge equipment already on these lines, even as work to convert the lines to standard gauge took place.

The vehicle classification system used by Mantetsu was changed several times over its years of operation. These can be divided into four periods:

- Period 1: 1907 (from start of operation until completion of the regauging of lines)
- Period 2: 1907–1920
- Period 3: 1920–1938
- Period 4: 1938–1945

The Manchukuo National Railway also used the Mantetsu classification system, as did the North China Transportation Company. The Chosen Government Railway used a classification system very similar to the Mantetsu system.

=== Locomotives ===
==== Period 1 ====
The numbering system is unclear for Period 1. Some locomotives – the 2-6-4 tank locomotives later designated Dabui-class, the 2-8-0 tender locomotives that became Sorii-class, and the 2-8-0 tender locomotives that became Sorini class – were numbered starting at 1, but there was no system of type classification.

==== Period 2 ====
The first system of type classification for locomotives consisted of a letter of the Roman alphabet to indicate the wheel arrangement based on the American names used for the given arrangement. If a second class of locomotive of the same wheel arrangement was introduced, this was indicated by a class number, which followed the type indicator letter. This class designator was then followed by the road number, counted starting at 1.

| Class | Wheel arrangement (Whyte) | Wheel arrangement (UIC) | American name |
|---|---|---|---|
| A | 4-4-0 | 2′B | American |
| B | 0-6-2T | C1′t | Branchliner |
| C | 0-8-0 | D | Eight-Coupled |
| D | 2-6-2 | 1′C1′ | Prairie |
| E | 4-4-4; 2-6-4 | 2′B2′ 1′C2′ | Double-Ender |
| F | 4-6-0 | 2′C | Ten-Wheeler |
| G | 4-6-2 | 2′C1′ | Pacific |
| H | 2-8-0 | 1′D | Consolidation |
| K | 0-4-2 | B1′ | Crane Locomotive |
| M | 2-8-2 | 1′D1′ | Mikado |
| P | 2-10-0 | 1′E | Decapod |

==== Period 3 ====
===== Steam locomotives =====
As in Period 2, the American-style wheel arrangement was used as the basis for the classification system introduced in 1920. However, in the new system, the American name was used as the basis for the class name, using two syllables of the American name as the new class name. The class name was made up of three katakana, of which the first two indicated the wheel arrangement, and the third indicated the class number – i.e. first, second, third, etc. of a given wheel arrangement. This was followed by a unit serial number in Roman numerals.

The first two katakana indicated the wheel arrangement, derived from the American naming system:

| Class | Former Class | Wheel arrangement (Whyte) | Wheel arrangement (UIC) | American name | In katakana |
|---|---|---|---|---|---|
| シグ; Shigu | - | 2-2-0 | 1′A | Single | シングル (shinguru) |
| アメ; Ame | A | 4-4-0 | 2′B | American | アメリカン (Amerikan) |
| エト; Eto | C | 0-8-0 | D | Eight-Coupled | エイトホイールカップルド (Eito hoīru kappurudo) |
| サタ; Sata | - | 2-10-2 | 1′E1′ | Santa Fe | サンタフェ (Santafe) |
| シカ; Shika | - | 0-6-0 | C | Six-Coupled | シックスホイールカップルド (shikkusu hoīru kappurudo） |
| プレ; Pure | D | 2-6-2 | 1′C1′ | Prairie | プレーリー (Purērī) |
| ダブ; Dabu | E | 4-4-4T; 2-6-4T | 2′B2′t; 1′C2′t | Double-Ender | ダブルエンダー (Daburu endā) |
| テホ; Teho | F | 4-6-0 | 2′C | Ten-Wheeler | テンホイーラー (Ten Hoīrā) |
| パシ; Pashi | G | 4-6-2 | 2′C1′ | Pacific | パシフィック (Pashifikku) |
| ソリ; Sori | H | 2-8-0 | 1′D | Consolidation | コンソリデーション (Konsoridēshion) |
| マテ; Mate | - | 4-8-2 | 2′D1′ | Mountain | マウンテン (Maunten) |
| モガ; Moga | - | 2-6-0 | 1′C | Mogul | モーガル (Mōgaru) |
| ミカ; Mika | M | 2-8-2 | 1′D1′ | Mikado | ミカド (Mikado) |
| デカ; Deka | P | 2-10-0 | 1′E | Decapod | デカポッド (Dekapoddo) |
| リク; Riku | - | 2-8-4 | 1′D2′ | Berkshire | タイリク (Tairiku) |

===== Other powered rolling stock =====
Self-moving rolling stock powered by something other than steam used a different system, which indicated the type of powerplant. Railway cranes were also classified like this.

| Class | Type | Source of Name |
|---|---|---|
| デセ; Dese | Diesel-powered | ジーゼル, "Diesel" (to 1934) |
| ジキ; Jiki | Diesel-powered | ジーゼル, "Diesel" (after 1934) |
| ケキ; Keki | Kerosene-powered | ケロシン, "Kerosene" |
| デキ; Deki | Electric-powered | 電気, Denki, "Electric" |
| レキ; Reki | Crane | "Recovery" |

The third katakana in the class name was the class number, derived from the first syllable of the corresponding Japanese number:

- 1 – i (イ), from イチ, "ichi"
- 2 – ni (ニ), from ニ, "ni"
- 3 – sa (サ), from サン, "san"
- 4 – shi (シ), from シ, "shi"
- 5 – ko (コ), from ゴ, "go"
- 6 – ro (ロ), from ロク, "roku"
- 7 – na (ナ), from ナナ, "nana"
- 8 – ha (ハ), from ハチ, "hachi"
- 9 – ku (ク), from ク, "ku"
- 10 – chi (チ), from ヂウ, "jyu"

==== Period 4 ====
When the operation and management of the Manchukuo National Railway and of the North China Transportation Company were transferred to Mantetsu, their rolling stock was incorporated into the Mantetsu classification system.

The naming system of Period 3 remained in use, but a new numbering system was introduced for road numbers. Numbers 1–500 were allocated to Mantetsu, numbers 501–1500 to the Manchukuo National, and numbers above 1501 to North China Transportation. Thus, パシニ37, パシニ508, and パシニ1523 would all be locomotives of the same class, but the number indicates their ownership.

=== Passenger cars ===
The type of car was indicated with one or two katakana, followed by a road number of one to four digits which indicated ownership and serial number. Mantetsu 3rd class coaches were numbered in the 1–2000 range, whilst 3rd class coaches of the Manchukuo National were numbered in the 2001–4000 range. Passenger cars of other types belonging to Mantetsu were numbered in the 1–200 range, and those belonging to the Manchukuo National were numbered in the 201–400 range.

| Class | Type | Class | Type | Class | Type |
|---|---|---|---|---|---|
| イ I | 1st class | キヒ; KiHi | VIP car | イア; IA | "Comfort" (brothel) car |
| ロ Ro | 2nd class | トク; ToKu | Special car | シヤ; ShiYa | Work car |
| ハ Ha | 3rd class | エレ; ERe | Memorial car | ケヒ; KeHi | Guards car |
| シ Shi | Dining car | テン; Ten | Observation car | ムテ; MuTe | Car without electricity |
| キ Ki | Kitchen car | ネ Ten | Sleeping car | シケ; ShiKe | Test vehicle |
| テ Te | Baggage car | セリ; SeRi | Medical car | - | - |
| ユ Yu | Mail car | キヨ; KiYo | School car | - | - |

Suffixes were used to express certain specific features of a given car type. オ ("O") indicated cars with independent heating, フ ("Fu") indicated that the car had a cabin for a train attendant, and フセ ("FuSe") indicated that the car had a control cabin for a train attendant.

=== Freight cars ===
The type of car was indicated with one or two katakana, followed by a road number.

| Class | Type | Class | Type | Class | Type |
| Closed cars | | Open cars | | Tank cars | |
|---|---|---|---|---|---|
| ヤ Ya | Boxcar | ム Mu | Gondola | ミ Mi | Water tank car |
| ホ Ho | Insulated boxcar | ツ Tsu | Sand car | ア A | Oil tank car |
| レ Re | Refrigerator car | タ Ta | Coal car (hopper) | ケ Ke | Light oil tank car (Kerosene, diesel) |
| フ Fu | Ventilated boxcar | コ Ko | Ore car | オ O | Heavy oil tank car |
| ウ U | Livestock car | チ Chi | Flatcar | マ Ma | Bean oil tank car |
| カ Ka | Caboose | アシ; AShi | Cinder car | ル Ru | Tar tank car |
| ヒ Hi | Emergency vehicle | - | - | リ Ri | Sulphuric acid tank car |
| エセ; ESe | Sanitation car | - | - | ヨ Yo | Nitric acid tank car |
| キケ; KiKe | Inspection car | - | - | ラ Ra | Paraffin tank car |
| コハ; KoHa | Construction Generator car | - | - | - | - |
| シク; ShiKu | Camp car | - | - | - | - |
| ユキ; YuKi | Camp car | - | - | - | - |

=== Railcars ===
==== Period 2 ====
The only powered railcars in use during Period 2 were inspection cars. There was no separate classification system for these; instead, they were classified the same way as locomotives, using the type designation "I" (from "Inspection").

==== Period 3 ====
The first railcars for passenger use appeared during this time. Passenger railcars were classified into two types based on the ignition method of the engine. Passenger railcars and inspection railcars used a different numbering system. Inspection railcars used a katakana type symbol, a class designation number if needed, and a road number. Passenger railcars added a marker to indicate passenger class. Railcars owned by the Manchukuo National Railway were indicated by prefixing 國 ("nation") to the designation.

| Class | Type |
|---|---|
| スペ; Supe | Steam-powered inspection railcars |
| モタ; Mota | Petrol-powered inspection railcars |
| ケ Ke | Kerosene-powered passenger railcars |
| ジ Ji | Diesel-powered passenger railcars |

==== Period 4 ====
The system used in Period 3 was continued, with some modifications. The use of 國 to mark railcars owned by the Manchukuo National was abolished.

| Class | Type |
|---|---|
| スペ; Supe | Steam-powered inspection railcars |
| スペキ; Supeki | Petrol-powered inspection railcars |
| モタ; Mota | Petrol-powered inspection railcars |
| キ Ki | Petrol-powered passenger railcars |
| ケ Ke | Kerosene-powered passenger railcars |
| ジ Ji | Diesel-powered passenger railcars |

== Locomotives ==
Through Periods 1 and 2, locomotives imported from the United States dominated, as prior to the construction of the JGR Class 9550 Japan did not have the capability to build large steam locomotives for trunk lines. From about the middle of Period 3, such locomotives built in Japan and at Mantetsu's Shahekou Works began to appear, eventually eliminating imports entirely.

=== Steam locomotives ===
==== Express passenger locomotives ====
| Class (Period 1) | Class (Period 2) | Class (Period 3) | Class (Period 4) | Postwar | Wheel arr. | Builder | In service (SMR+MNR) | Total in class | Image | Notes |
|---|---|---|---|---|---|---|---|---|---|---|
| | SMR: G 800–806 | SMR: パシイ 800–806 (Pashii); MNR: パシコ 5900–5905 (Pashiko) | SMR: パシイ 1 MNR: パシイ 501–506 | CR SL11 | 4-6-2 | ALCo | 1908 | 7 | | 6 to MNR in 1933 |
| | SMR: G1 850–855 | SMR: パシニ 850–855 (Pashini) | SMR: パシニ 1–6 | CR SL2 | 4-6-2 | Shahekou | 1916, 1921 | 6 | | |
| | SMR: G2 900–905 | SMR: パシサ 900–905 (Pashisa; to 1933); SMR: パシハ 5920–5925 (Pashiha; 1933–34); MNR: パシナ 5920–5925 (Pashina; 1934–38) | MNR: パシシ 501–506 | CR SL4 | 4-6-2 | Baldwin | 1919 | 6 | | All to MNR in 1933 |
| | SMR: G3 920–942 | SMR: パシシ 920–942 (Pashishi) | SMR: パシシ 1–23 | CR SL4 | 4-6-2 | Shahekou | 1921–1927 | 23 | | |
| | | SMR: パシコ 950–960 (Pashiko) | SMR: パシコ 1–11 | CR SL5 | 4-6-2 | Shahekou | 1927–1928 | 11 | | |
| | | SMR: パシサ 860–875 (Pashisa); MNR: パシシ 5830–5859 | SMR: パシサ 1–16; MNR: パシサ 501–530; NCTC: パシサ 1501–1550 | CR SL3; KSR 바시서 | 4-6-2 | Hitachi; Kisha Seizō | 1934–1940 | 46 | | All 16 Mantetsu units to DPRK in 1945 |
| | | SMR: パシロ 900–919 (Pashiro); MNR: パシ 800–818 (Pashi; to 9/33); MNR: パシク 5950–5999 (Pashiku); MNR: パシク 15900–15927 | SMR: パシロ 1–45; MNR: パシロ 501–632; NCTC: パシロ 1501–1512; NCTC: パシロ 1533–1589 | CR SL6 | 4-6-2 | Hitachi, Kawasaki; Shahekou, Kisha Seizō; Nippon Sharyō | 1933–1944 | 77 | | 566–569 & 571–578 to NCTC, replaced 1938 same nums |
| | | SMR: パシナ 970–981 (Pashina) | パシナ 1–12 | CR SL7 | 4-6-2 | Shahekou, Kawasaki | 1934–1936 | 12 | | |
| | | SMR: パシハ 811–816 (Pashiha) | SMR: パシハ 1–16; MNR: パシハ 501 | CR SL8 | 4-6-2 | Hitachi, Shahekou | 1937, 1940 | 17 | | |

==== Ordinary passenger locomotives ====
| Class (Period 1) | Class (Period 2) | Class (Period 3) | Class (Period 4) | Postwar | Wheel arr. | Builder | In service (SMR+MNR) | Total in class | Image | Notes |
|---|---|---|---|---|---|---|---|---|---|---|
| SMR: 50−53 | SMR: A 50–53 | SMR: アメ 50–53 (Ame) | SMR: アメイ 1–4 | CR AM1 | 4-4-0 | ALCo | 1907 | 4 | | |
| SMR: 100–101 | SMR: F 600–601 (to 1918) | MNR: テホニ 5621–5622 (Tehoni) | MNR: テホニ 501–502 | CR TH10 | 4-6-0 | ALCo | 1906 | 4 | | to Jichang Jidun Railway in 1918; to MNR 1933 |
| | SMR: F1 602–619 | SMR: テホイ 602–619 (Tehoi); MNR: テホサ 5650–5651 (Tehosa; from SMR 1933) | SMR: テホイ 1–15; MNR: テホイ 501–502 | CR TH1 | 4-6-0 | ALCo | 1908 | 17 | | |
| | SMR: F1 620–624 | SMR: テホニ 620–624 (Tehoni) | SMR: テホイ 16–20 | CR TH1 | 4-6-0 | ALCo | 1912 | 5 | | |
| | SMR: F2 700–704 | SMR: テホサ 700–704 (Tehosa; to 1931); MNR: テホコ 5700–5704 (Tehoko; from 1933) | MNR: テホサ501–505 | CR ? | 4-6-0 | Beyer, Peacock & Company | 1931 | 5 | | |
| | | SMR: ダブサ 500–501 (Dabusa) | SMR: ダブサ 1–2 | CR LD1 | 4-4-4T | Kawasaki | 1936 | 2 | | |

==== Express freight locomotives ====
| Class (Period 1) | Class (Period 2) | Class (Period 3) | Class (Period 4) | Postwar | Wheel arr. | Builder | In service (SMR+MNR) | Total in class | Image | Notes |
|---|---|---|---|---|---|---|---|---|---|---|
| | | SMR: マテイ 1800–1806 (Matei) | SMR マテイ 1–7 | CR MT1 | 4-8-2 | Kawasaki, Hitachi | 1936 | 7 | | |
| | | SMR: ミカニ 1600–1640 (Mikani) | SMR: ミカニ 1–41 | CR JF2 | 2-8-2 | ALCo, Shahekou, Kawasaki, Kisha Seizō | 1924–1932 | 41 | | |
| | | SMR: ミカシ 1650–1664 (Mikashi) | SMR: ミカシ 1–15 | CR JF4 | 2-8-2 | Kawasaki (1–11), Kisha Seizō (12–15) | 1935 | 15 | | |

==== General freight locomotives ====
| Class (Period 1) | Class (Period 2) | Class (Period 3) | Class (Period 4) | Postwar | Wheel arr. | Builder | In service (SMR+MNR) | Total in class | Image | Notes |
|---|---|---|---|---|---|---|---|---|---|---|
| SMR: ? | SMR: B6 various | -- | -- | -- | 0-6-2T | various | 187 | 1905 (to SMR) | | 1067 mm gauge. 12 to Taiwan Government Railway, rest returned to Japan in 1908. |
| SMR: 1–2 | SMR: H 1000–1001 (to 1918) | MNR: ソリシ 6050–6051 (Sorishi) | MNR: ソリロ 505–506 (Soriro) | CR KD23 | 2-8-0 | ALCo | 1906 | 2 | | to Jichang Ry. in 1918; to MNR in 1933 |
| SMR: 3–7 | SMR: H1 1002–1047 | SMR: ソリイ 1002–1047 (Sorii); MNR: ソリナ 6200–6214 (Sorina) | SMR: ソリイ 1–26; MNR: ソリイ 501–515 | CR KD1 | 2-8-0 | ALCo | 1907–1908 | 41 | | 15 to MNR in 1933 |
| SMR: 34–53 | SMR: H2 1048–1067 | SMR: ソリニ 1048–1067 (Sorini) | SMR: ソリニ 1–20 | CR KD11 | 2-8-0 | Baldwin | 1907 | 20 | | |
| | SMR: H3 1068–1107 | SMR: ソリサ 1068–1107 (Sorisa); MNR: ソリク (Soriku) | SMR: ソリサ 1–7; MNR: ソリサ 501–533 | CR KD3 | 2-8-0 | Beyer, Peacock & Company | 1910–1911 | 40 | | 13 to MNR in 1933, 20 to MNR in 1935 |
| | SMR: H4 1200–1212 | SMR: ソリシ 1200–1212 (Sorishi); MNR: ソリチ 6280–6292 (Sorichi) | MNR: ソリサ 534–546 | CR KD3 | 2-8-0 | Shahekou | 1914–1920 | 13 | | to MNR in 1933 |
| | | | SMR: ソリサ 8–22 (Sorisa); MNR: ソリサ 547–561 | CR KD10 | 2-8-0 | Baldwin, Altoona Works | 1905–1907 | 30 | | From PRR in 1938 |
| | SMR: M 1500–1524 | SMR: ミカイ 1500–1569 (Mikai); MNR: ミカ 1500–1533 (Mika; 1st); MNR: ミカナ 6700–6773 (Mikana; 2nd) | SMR: ミカイ 1–70; MNR: ミカイ 501–574 | CR JF1 | 2-8-2 | ALCo, Shahekou, Kisha Seizō, Kawasaki, Hitachi, Nippon Sharyō | 1918–1935 | 144 | | |
| | | SMR: ミカサ 1400–1442 (Mikasa); MNR: ミカロ 6600–6647 (Mikaro) | SMR: ミカロ 1–43; MNR: ミカロ 501–548 | CR JF6 | 2-8-2 | Kawasaki, Kisha Seizō, Hitachi, Nippon Sharyō | 1934 | 91 | | |
| | | SMR: ミカコ 1570–1587 (Mikako); MNR: ミカナ 6774–6899 (Mikana); MNR: ミカナ 16700–16717; MNR: ミカナ 16737–16738 | SMR: ミカイ 71–341 (Mikai); MNR: ミカイ 575–1283; NCTC: ミカイ1501–1769 | CR JF1 | 2-8-2 | Shahekou, Kisha Seizō, Kawasaki, Hitachi | 1935–1945 | 980 | | 20 from MNR to NCTC in 1938 |
| | | SMR: ミカロ 1480–1499 (Mikaro); SMR: ミカロ 11400–11401; MNR: ミカロ 6648–6699; MNR: ミカロ 16600–16638 | SMR: ミカロ 44–101; MNR: ミカロ 549–639; MNR: ミカロ 645–724; NCTC: ミカロ 1501–1620 (?) | CR JF6 | 2-8-2 | Kawasaki, Kisha Seizō, Hitachi, Shahekou, Nippon Sharyō, Dalian | 1935−1944 | 228 | | MNR 640–644 to NCTC |
| | SMR: P 1700–1761 | SMR: デカ 1700–1761 (Deka); MNR: デカ 6900–6914 | SMR: デカイ 1–47 (Dekai); MNR: デカイ 501–515 | CR DK1 | 2-10-0 | ALCo, Shahekou | 1919 | 62 | | 15 to MNR in 1935 |

==== Shunting locomotives ====
| Class (Period 1) | Class (Period 2) | Class (Period 3) | Class (Period 4) | Postwar | Wheel arr. | Builder | In service (SMR+MNR) | Total in class | Image | Notes |
|---|---|---|---|---|---|---|---|---|---|---|
| | SMR: 300-317 | SMR: エト; 1300-1317 (Eto) | SMR: エトイ; 1-18 (Etoi) | CR ET6 | 0-8-0 | Baldwin Locomotive Works | 1919 | 18 | | Imported as a more powerful shunting locomotive type in preparation for increasing freight train lengths at the time. |
| | SMR: D 200-234 | SMR: プレ xxx (Pure); MNR: プレシ (x)–(x+3) (Pureshi) | SMR: プレイ 1–? (Purei); MNR: プレイ 501–503 | CR PL1 | 2-6-2 | ALCo | 1908 | 35 | | 3 to MNR 1933 |
| | | | SMR: プレニ 1–20 (Pureni) | CR PL2 | 2-6-2 | Nippon Sharyō | 1935 | 20 | | |
| | | | SMR: プレサ 1–18? (Puresa) | CR PL3 | 2-6-2T | Gyeongseong | 1946 | >18 | | from Sentetsu after 1938 |
| SMR: 1-33 | SMR: E 400-468 | SMR: ダブ 4xx (Dabu); MNR: ダブコ xxx (Dabuko) | SMR: ダブイ 1–? (Dabui); MNR: ダブイ 501–549 | CR DB1 | 2-6-4T | ALCo | 1907 | 69 | | 15 to Army 1931–33; 40 to MNR 1933 |
| | | SMR: ダブニ460-474 (Dabuni) | SMR: ダブニ; 1-15 (Dabuni) | CR DB2 | 2-6-4T | Hitachi; Kisha Seizō | 1934 | 15 | | Manafactured as replacements for the Dabui Types that were sold off to the MNR. |

==== Diesel Locomotives ====
| Class (Period 1) | Class (Period 2) | Class (Period 3) | Class (Period 4) | Postwar | Builder | In service | Total in class | Image | Notes |
|---|---|---|---|---|---|---|---|---|---|
| | | SMR: ジキイ; 2000 (Ziki) | SMR: ジキイ; 1 (Jikii) | ? | Sulzer | 1931 | 1 | | Imported on a trial basis for shunting purposes. |
| | | SMR: ジキニ; 2001 (Jikini) | SMR: ジキニ; 1 (Jikini) | ? | Esslingen Mann | 1931 | 1 | | Imported experimentally alongside the Jikii 1 Type for shunting purposes. |
| | | SMR: ジキイ; 7000-7001 (Ziki) | SMR: ジキイ; 501-502 (Jikii) | ? | Hitachi | 1935 | 2 | | Domestically produced for use in the construction of new national railway lines, particularly in the water-scarce northern Manchuria region. |

==== Electric Locomotives ====
| Class (Period 1) | Class (Period 2) | Class (Period 3) | Class (Period 4) | Postwar | Builder | In service | Total in class | Image | Notes |
|---|---|---|---|---|---|---|---|---|---|
| | | SMR: デキ; 3000-3004 (Deki) | SMR: デキイ; 1-5 (Dekii) | ? | Kawasaki | 1930 | 5 | | A special-purpose shunting locomotive for Amajiko Wharf, which could operate from either conventional overheard wires or off of a 3rd rail system. |

==== Miscellaneous ====
| Class (Period 1) | Class (Period 2) | Class (Period 3) | Class (Period 4) | Postwar | Builder | In service | Total in class | Image | Notes |
|---|---|---|---|---|---|---|---|---|---|
| | SMR: K xxx | SMR: クレ xxx (Kure) | SMR: クレイ xxx (Kurei) | to CR | Borsig | 1909 | 4 | | Railway cranes for shop and emergency use |
| | | SMR: クレ xxx (Kure) | SMR: クレ xxx (Kure) | ? | Kisha Seizō | 1931 | 1 | | 80-ton railway crane; proved too large for efficient use. |
| | | SMR: クレ xxx (Kure) | SMR: クレ xxx (Kure) | ? | Kisha Seizō | 1933 | ? | | 45-ton railway cranes |
| | | | MNR: ミカク 501 (Mikaku) | - | Dalian | 1941 | 1 | | Experimental water-recycler for long-distance operation. In testing ran 1,600 km (990 mi) without taking on water |
| | | | SMR: リクイ (Rikui) | - | - | - | 0 | | 2-8-4 derivative of Mikai class, incomplete |
| | | | SMR: リクニ (Rikuni) | - | - | - | 0 | | 2-8-4 derivative of Mikaro class, incomplete |
| | | SMR: シカ; 5064 (Shika) | SMR: シカイ; 505* (Shikai) | ? | Rogers | 1898 | 1 | | ex Jinghan Railway; used at Shahekou Works, not for revenue service |

== Powered railcars ==
=== Inspection railcars ===
| Class (Period 1) | Class (Period 2) | Class (Period 3) | Class (Period 4) | Postwar | Builder | In service | Total in class | Notes |
|---|---|---|---|---|---|---|---|---|
| | SMR: I xxx | SMR: スペ xxx (SuPe) | SMR: スペ1 1–2 (SuPe1) | - | Baldwin | 1907 | 2 | Steam railcars. Passenger compartment converted to office space for inspection crew. |
| | | SMR: モタ 1–2 (MoTa) | SMR: モタ2 1–2 (MoTa2) | ? | ? | 1910–1911 | 2 | 2-axle petrol-powered railcars made in the UK for track maintenance. |
| | | SMR: モタ1 1 (MoTa1) | SMR: スペキ1 1 (SuPeKi1) | ? | Shahekou | 1931 | 1 | All-steel railcar with two 135 hp (101 kW) Mack petrol engines and electric transmission. |

=== Passenger railcars ===
Due to the inefficiencies of mixed trains for passenger services due to the long station stops needed for the shunting of freight cars to their destinations, Mantetsu opted to begin using passenger railcars on routes with lower passenger demand, for school shuttles, and the like. These railcars were somewhat different in character from those found in Japan, where they were introduced primarily as a competitive measure against the arrival of busses.

As a result of experimentation with different technologies and fuel types (diesel, petrol, heavy oil, kerosene, etc.), there were a comparatively large number of classes of railcar operated over a relatively short period of time. Eventually, Mantetsu settled on railcars with petrol engines and mechanical transmission, and such railcars became the most numerous. Aside from a number built by the Shahekou Works, these railcars were for the most part built by Nippon Sharyō in Japan.

Although most were introduced in Period 3, due to the overlap in the Mantetsu and Manchurian National classifications of railcars, the list below is presented in the order of the unified classification scheme of 1938 (Period 4).

==== Petrol railcars ====
| Class (Period 3) | Class (Period 4) | Postwar | Builder | In service | Total in class | Capacity | Weight | Engine | Transmission | Notes |
|---|---|---|---|---|---|---|---|---|---|---|
| SMR: ケハ1 1 (KeHa-1) | - | - | ? | 1930 | 1 | ? | ? | Petrol | ? | 2-axle 3rd class railcar. Retired by 1938. |
| SMR: ケハ2 10–14 (KeHa-2) | MNR: キハ1 201–205 (KiHa-1) | ? | Nippon Sharyō | 1930 | 5 | 50 | 15.32t | Waukesha 6SRL petrol | mech | To MNR in 1935–36. |
| SMR: ケハ3 101–112 (KeHa-3) | SMR: キハ2 101–112 (KiHa-2) | ? | Nippon Sharyō | 1930 | 12 | 110 | 22.6t | Waukesha 6RB petrol | mech | 3rd class railcars. |
| MNR: 國ケハ3 72–73 (KokuKeHa-3) | MNR: キハ2 201–202 | ? | Nippon Sharyō | 1933 | 2 | 84 (summer); 78 (winter) | 22.5t | petrol | mech | 3rd class railcars with baggage room. |
| SMR: ケハ4 201–202 (KeHa-4) | SMR: キハ3 101–103 | ? | Nippon Sharyō | 1932 | 3 | 84 (summer); 78 (winter) | 21.5t | petrol | mech | 3rd class railcars. |
| SMR: ケハ4 203–210 | SMR: キハ3 104–111 | ? | ? | 1933 | 8 | 84 (summer); 78 (winter) | 21.5t | petrol | mech | 3rd class railcars. |
| SMR: ケハ4 211–213 | SMR: キハ3 112–114 | ? | Nippon Sharyō | 1934 | 3 | 84 (summer); 78 (winter) | 21.5t | petrol | mech | 3rd class railcars. |
| SMR: ケハ4 214–221(?) | SMR: キハ3 115–222 | ? | ? | 1935 | 8 | 84 (summer); 78 (winter) | 21.5t | petrol | mech | 3rd class railcars. |
| MNR: 國ケハ2 71 (KokuKeHa-2) | MNR: キハ3 201 | ? | Nippon Sharyō | 1933 | 1 | 73 (summer); 68 (winter) | 22.5t | Waukesha 6RB petrol | mech | 3rd class railcars with 7-person VIP room. |
| MNR: 國ケハ1 102–130 (KokuKeHa-1) | MNR: キハ3 200–228 | ? | Nippon Sharyō | 1933 | 29 | 84 (summer); 78 (winter) | 21.5t | Kawasaki KW127 petrol | mech | 3rd class railcars. |
| SMR: ケハ4 222–225? | SMR: キハ3 123–126 | ? | Nippon Sharyō? | 1937 | 4 | 84 (summer); 78 (winter) | 21.5t | Waukesha 6WRB petrol | mech | 3rd class railcars. |
| - | SMR: キハ3 127–129 | ? | Nippon Sharyō? | 1938 | 3 | 84 (summer); 78 (winter) | 21.5t | Waukesha 6WRB petrol | mech | 3rd class railcars. |
| - | SMR: キハ3 130–135 | ? | Nippon Sharyō? | 1939 | 6 | 84 (summer); 78 (winter) | 21.5t | Waukesha 6WRB petrol | mech | 3rd class railcars. |
| - | SMR: キハ3 136–145 | ? | Nippon Sharyō? | 1940 | 10 | 84 (summer); 78 (winter) | 21.5t | Waukesha 6WRB petrol | mech | 3rd class railcars. |
| SMR: ケハ5 301–302 (KeHa-5) | SMR: キハ4 101–102 (KiHa-4) | ? | Nippon Sharyō? | 1937 | 2 | 82 | | petrol | mech | 3rd class railcars. |
| MNR: 國ケハ4 201–203 (KokuKeHa-4) | MNR: キハ5 201–203 (KiHa-5) | ? | Nippon Sharyō? | 1935 | 3 | 92 (summer); 86 (winter) | 26.5t | Kawasaki KP170 petrol | mech | 3rd class railcars. |

==== Diesel railcars ====
| Class (Period 3) | Class (Period 4) | Postwar | Builder | In service | Total in class | Capacity | Weight | Engine | Transmission | Notes |
|---|---|---|---|---|---|---|---|---|---|---|
| SMR: ジハ2 1 (JiHa-2) | SMR: ケハ3 101 (KeHa-3) | ? | Nippon Sharyō | 1934 | 1 | 84 (summer); 78 (winter) | 21.5t | 130 hp AEC; Diesel | ? | 3rd class railcar for high-speed testing. Body based on KiHa-3 100-series. Streamlined front end. |
| MNR: 國ジハ1 2101–2104 (KokuJiHa-1) | MNR: ケハ3 202–205 | ? | Nippon Sharyō | 1936 | 4 | 84 (summer); 78 (winter) | 25.5t | Mitsubishi; Diesel | ? | 3rd class railcar. Body similar to KiHa-3 100-series. |
| MNR: 國ジハ2 2201–2206 (KokuJiHa-2) | MNR: ケハ5 201–206 | ? | Nippon Sharyō | 1936 | 6 | 92 (summer); 86 (winter) | 26.3t | Mitsubishi or Niigata Tekkō; Diesel | ? | 3rd class railcar. |
| SMR: ジハ4 101–102 (JiHa-4) | SMR: ケハ6 101–102 | ? | ? | 1937 | 2 | 82 (summer); 76 (winter) | 34.47t | Kobe Mitsubishi; 8T13.5/T Diesel | Sinclair TC-50 hydraulic | Streamlined 3rd class railcars. |
| MNR: 國ジハ3 2301–2302 (KokuJiHa-3) | MNR: ケハ7 201–202 | ? | ? | 1938 | 2 | 92 (summer); 86 (winter) | 34.5t | 150 hp Mitsubishi; Diesel | Hoyt hydraulic | Streamlined 2-car 3rd class DMU. |

==== Heavy oil railcars ====
| Class (Period 3) | Class (Period 4) | Postwar | Builder | In service | Total in class | Capacity | Weight | Engine | Transmission | Notes |
|---|---|---|---|---|---|---|---|---|---|---|
| SMR: ジハ1 1–2 (JiHa-1) | SMR: ジハ1 1–2 (JiHa-1) | ? | Dalian Machinery | 1931 | 2 | 65 (summer); 59 (winter) | 49.23t | 250 hp Sulzer; Diesel | electric | 3rd class power car. |
| SMR: ハト2 1–2 (HaTo-2) | SMR: ハフ2 1–2 (HaFu-2) | ? | Shahekou | 1931 | 2 | 104 (summer); 92 (winter) | 24.2t | - | - | 3rd class trailer for JiHa-1. |
| SMR: ジテ1 1–6 (JiTe-1) | SMR: ジテ1 1–6 (JiTe-1) | ? | Nippon Sharyō | 1935 | 6 | 4t baggage | 40.0t | First four: Sulzer 6VL25; Last two: Niigata K6D | ? | Streamlined power car with baggage room. Usual trainset ジテ1+ロハフ1+ハフ1+ハフセ1 or ジテ1+ロハフ1+2x ハフ1+ロハフ1+ジテ1. Used by CR around Fushun after the war, derivatives also built and used until recently. |
| SMR: ロハフ1 1–6 (RoHaFu-1) | SMR: ロハフ1 1–6 | ? | Nippon Sharyō | 1935 | 6 | 28+58& (2nd/3rd) | - | - | - | 2nd+3rd class trailer for JiTe-1. Also used as passenger cars behind Dabusa classlocomotives during oil shortage. Total train weight: ジテ1+ロハフ1+ハフ1+ハフセ1 133t. |
| SMR: ハフ1 1–6 (HaFu-1) | SMR: ハフ1 1–6 | ? | Nippon Sharyō | 1935 | 6 | 102 | - | - | - | 3rd class trailer for JiTe-1. Also used as passenger cars behind Dabusa class locomotives during oil shortage. Total train weight: ジテ1+ロハフ1+ハフ1+ハフセ1 133t. |
| SMR: ハフセ1 1–6 (HaFuSe-1) | SMR: ハフセ1 1–6 | ? | Nippon Sharyō | 1935 | 6 | 98 | - | - | - | 3rd class driving trailer for JiTe-1. Also used as passenger cars behind Dabusa class locomotives during oil shortage. Total train weight: ジテ1+ロハフ1+ハフ1+ハフセ1 133t. |

== Passenger cars ==
Like with locomotives, in Periods 1 and 2 most passenger cars were imported from the US.

=== Coaches (seat cars) ===
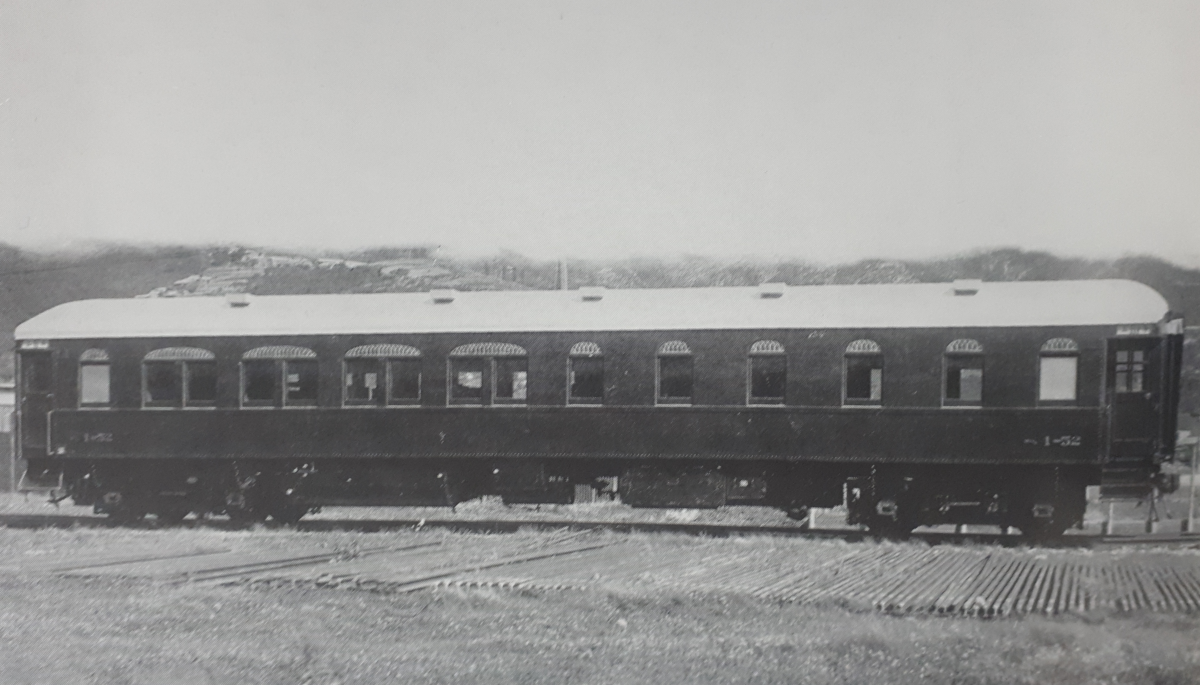
Builder's photo of RoHa3 1-52 mixed 2nd and 3rd class carriage; Kisha Seizō, 1934

- イ形 - I class – 1st class coaches. Five 66-passenger coaches imported from the US. Four converted to combined 1st/2nd class coaches in 1917. The fifth car was converted to a hearse after the Mukden Incident.
- イ1形 - I-1 class – 1st class coaches (couchettes). Five built. Capacity 64 people. Seats convertible to beds (capacity 32 people). Because they were convertible to sleepers, three of the five were converted to イネ5 class 1st class sleepers in 1923.
- イ2形 - I-2 class – 1st class coaches (couchettes). Ten built by Shahekou Works (three in 1917, two in 1918, two in 1919, three in 1920). Capacity 63 people. Seats convertible to beds (capacity 16 people). Eight converted to イネイ2 class combined 1st class sleeper/coaches in 1923.
- イ3形 - I-3 class – 1st class coaches. Two converted to イネ6 class 1st class sleepers in 1923.
- イ5形 - I-5 class – 1st class coaches. Two converted to イネイ1 class combined 1st class sleeper/coaches in 1922.
- unknown class – two 1st class coaches made in 1935 for special express trains.
- イ8形 - I-8 class – 1st class coaches for the Asia Express. Two built at Shahekou Works in 1935. Weight 56.5 t (55.6 long tons; 62.3 short tons), capacity 60 people in 2+2 bench seats.
- イロ1形 - IRo-1 class – 1st/2nd class coaches. Ten built. Some transferred to Manchukuo National, some scrapped.
- イロ2形 - IRo-2 class – 1st/2nd class coaches. Some transferred to Manchukuo National, some scrapped.
- イロ3形 - IRo-3 class – 1st/2nd class coaches. Some transferred to Manchukuo National, some scrapped.
- イロ4形 - IRo-4 class – 1st/2nd class coaches. Some transferred to Manchukuo National, some scrapped.
- イロ5形 - IRo-5 class – 1st/2nd class coaches. Some transferred to Manchukuo National, some scrapped.
- ロ1形 - Ro-1 class – 2nd class coaches. Nineteen built. Some converted to 3rd class in 1917.
- ロ2形 - Ro-2 class – 2nd class coaches. Some converted to 3rd class in 1917.
- ロ3形 - Ro-3 class – 2nd class coaches. Five built in 1934 for special express trains.
- ロ8形 - Ro-8 class – 2nd class coaches for the Asia Express. Five built at Shahekou Works in 1934. Weight 56.5 t (55.6 long tons; 62.3 short tons), capacity 68 people in 2+2 bench seats.
- ロハ1形 - RoHa-1 class – 2nd/3rd class coaches. Two converted from 2nd class cars in 1916. Some (total six cars of all ロハ classes) transferred to Manchukuo National.
- ロハ2形 - RoHa-2 class – 2nd/3rd class coaches. Five converted from 1st/2nd class cars in 1918. Some (total six cars of all ロハ classes) transferred to Manchukuo National.
- ロハ3形 - RoHa-3 class – 2nd/3rd class coaches. Some (total six cars of all ロハ classes) transferred to Manchukuo National.
- ロハ5形 - RoHa-5 class – 2nd/3rd class coaches. Two cars built new. Some (total six cars of all ロハ classes) transferred to Manchukuo National.
- ハ1形 - Ha-1 class – 3rd class coaches. Converted from boxcars in 1907 for the start of Mantetsu operations.
- ハ2形 - Ha-2 class – 3rd class coaches.
- ハ3形 - Ha-3 class – 3rd class coaches.
- ハ5形 - Ha-5 class – 3rd class coaches. Built from 1922, first Japanese-made all-steel cars. Used on Dalian–Changchun express trains.
- ハ6形 - Ha-6 class – 3rd class coaches.
- ハ8形 - Ha-8 class – 3rd class coaches for the Asia Express. Eight built at Shahekou Works in 1934. Weight 57.0 t (56.1 long tons; 62.8 short tons), capacity 88 people in 2+2 bench seats.
- ハオ1形 - HaO-1 class – 3rd class coaches with independent heating for use on mixed trains. Converted from 3rd class coaches in 1923 by the addition of a boiler to heat the car in the winter. After the arrival of diesel railcars rendered them superfluous, they were used as regular 3rd class coaches.
- ハテ1形 - HaTe-1 class – combination 3rd class coach with baggage compartment. Thirty ハテ1 and ハテ2 class built by Kisha Seizō from 1912. Some transferred to Manchukuo National between 1933 and 1935.
- ハテ2形 - HaTe-2 class – combination 3rd class coach with baggage compartment. Thirty ハテ1 and ハテ2 class built by Kisha Seizō from 1912. Three converted to combination baggage/mail cars in 1927. Some transferred to Manchukuo National between 1933 and 1935.
- ハテ4形 - HaTe-4 class – combination 3rd class coach with baggage compartment. 2 built by Mantetsu in 1916.
- ハテ5形 - HaTe-5 class – combination 3rd class coach with baggage compartment. Five built between 1929 and 1934.
- ハテユ3形 - HaTeYu-3 class – combination 3rd class coach with baggage and mail compartments.

=== Sleeping cars ===
- イネ1形 - INe-1 class – 1st class sleepers imported from the US in 1908.
- イネ2形 - INe-2 class – 1st class sleepers imported from the US.
- イネ4形 - INe-4 class – 1st class sleepers imported from the US.
- イネ5形 - INe-5 class – 1st class sleepers. Three converted from イ1 class 1st class coaches in 1923.
- イネ6形 - INe-6 class – 1st class sleepers. Two converted from イ3 class 1st class coaches in 1923.
- イネ7形 - INe-7 class – 1st class sleepers. First passenger cars with three-axle bogies designed by Mantetsu, built by Shahekou Works in 1924. Capacity of 48 people in the 1st class compartment (24 as beds), and 6 people in the special room (2 as bedroom). Beds of open Pullman type. There were three lavatories (men, women, VIP), as well as a smoking room adjacent to the men's lavatory. Originally, six were to be built, but as most of the Dalian–Changchun were daytime trains, only three were built as planned, the other three were built as observation cars.
- イネイ1形 - INeI-1 class – combined 1st class sleeper/coach. Two converted from イ5 class 1st class coaches in 1922, and two converted from イネイ2 class in 1926.
- イネイ2形 - INeI-2 class – combined 1st class sleeper/coach. Eight converted from イ2 class 1st class coaches in 1923. In 1926, two were converted into イネイ1 class.
- イロネ1形 - IRoNe-1 class – 1st/2nd class sleepers. Seven built in 1916.
- イロネ2形 - IRoNe-2 class – 1st/2nd class sleepers.
- イロネ6形 - IRoNe-6 class – 1st/2nd class sleepers.
- ロネ1形 - RoNe-1 class – 2nd class sleepers. All-steel with two-axle bogies. Capacity 56 people (28 as beds). 2nd class version of the イネ7 class. Four built in 1925 and five in 1926, all by Shahekou Works.
- ロネ2形 - RoNe-2 class – 2nd class sleepers.
- ロネテ1形 - RoNeTe-1 class – 2nd class sleepers with baggage compartment. Seven built in 1916.
- ロネテ2形 - RoNeTe-2 class – 2nd class sleepers with baggage compartment.
- ロハネ1形 - RoHaNe-1 class – 2nd/3rd class sleepers.
- ハネ1形 - HaNe-1 class – 3rd class sleepers. All-steel with two-axle bogies. Capacity 80 people (64 as beds). Five built in 1925; bodies built by Dalian Machine Works, final assembly and finishing at Shahekou Works.
- ハネ2形 - HaNe-2 class – 3rd class sleepers.
- イネシ1形 - INeShi-1 class – combined 1st class sleeper/diner. Three converted from unknown cars in 1923.

=== Dining cars ===
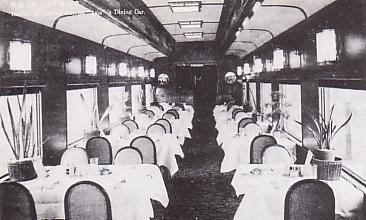
Interior of シ8 class dining car

- シ1形 - Shi-1 class – The suspension of express services in 1918 led to greater numbers of passengers on ordinary trains; consequently, more dining cars were needed, so twelve were built by Shahekou Works, eight in 1919 and four in 1920. Capacity 50 people.
- シ2形 - Shi-2 class – Seven cars. Three imported from the United States in 1908 from Pullman; these were similar to the Pullman diners in use on long-distance trains in the US at the time. Originally built with wooden underframes, they were rebuilt with steel underframes in 1930. A further four were built by Shahekou works, two each in 1913 and 1915. Capacity 30 people.
- シ3形 - Shi-3 class – Reclassified from シ2 class in 1938.
- シ4形 - Shi-4 class – All-steel cars with round roof for use on express trains, three built in 1934. Interior layout was the same as the シ8 class used on the Asia Express. Capacity 36 people.
- シ5形 - Shi-5 class – Built for use on express trains to Beijing. These had larger kitchens than the シ4 class. Capacity 30 people.
- シ6形 - Shi-6 class – Twelve built from 1939. Air-conditioned version of シ4 class, used to replace older dining cars.
- シ8形 - Shi-8 class – Dining cars for the Asia Express. Four built at Shahekou Works in 1934. Weight 59.0 t (58.1 long tons; 65.0 short tons), capacity 36 people with four-seater tables on one side of the aisle and two-seater tables on the other side. There was a smoking room at one end of the car, a service counter, pantry and kitchen at the other end.
- イシ形 - IShi class – combination 1st class/dining car. Three built in 1911. Converted to ロシ3 class combination 2nd class/dining cars in 1927.
- ロシ1形 - RoShi-1 class – combination 2nd class/dining car. Four converted from シ1 class diners in 1922. Capacity 20 people in the dining area, plus 36 in the 2nd class compartment.
- ロシ2形 - RoShi-2 class – combination 2nd class/dining car. Four converted from シ1 class diners in 1926. Capacity 32 people in the 2nd class compartment.
- ロシ3形 - RoShi-3 class – combination 2nd class/dining car. Three converted from イシ class combination 1st class/dining cars in 1927.
- ロシ4形 - RoShi-4 class – combination 2nd class/dining car. 47 built between 1937 and 1939. Capacity 24 people in the dining area, plus 20 in the 2nd class compartment.
- ハシ1形 - HaShi-1 class – combination 3rd class/dining car. Four converted from ハ1 class 3rd class coaches in 1922. Capacity 12 people in the dining area, plus 49 in the 3rd class compartment.
- ハキ3形 - HaKi-3 class – combination 3rd class/kitchen car.

=== Observation cars ===
- テンイ1形 - TenI-1 class – 1st class observation cars designed and built by Shahekou Works in 1924, the first entirely domestic passenger cars. 1st class seating compartment seated 32 people, the special VIP room seated 6 people, the observation room seated 12. Wood car on steel frame with three-axle bogies. Used on the Dalian–Changchun express train that started operation in 1924.
- テン81形 - TenI-8 class – 1st class observation cars for the Asia Express; four built by the Shahekou Works in 1934. Weight 57 t (56 long tons; 63 short tons). In addition to the observation lounge, there was a 1st class seating compartment and a special VIP room. The observation lounge seated 12 people in armchairs, the special room seated five people in a sofa and an armchair, and the 1st class compartment had bench seating for 30 people; total capacity of the car was 35 people. These cars carried special "Asia Express" markings - "あじあ" on the sides, and a red and white rectangular emblem on the rear central door.

=== Special cars ===
- 特別車1 – Special Car 1 – VIP car converted from a 2nd class passenger car in 1908. After the arrival of トク202 the following year, it was downgraded to a regular 1st/2nd class car.
- トク202 – ToKu 202 – VIP car converted from an American-made 1st class passenger car in 1909. Transferred to the Manchukuo National in 1935.
- トク1 – ToKu 1 – Made in 1911 by Metropolitan Amalgamated of the UK.
- 特別車4 – Special Car 4 – Built by Shahekou Works in 1935 to replace トク202
- トク2 – ToKu 2 – Built in 1936 by Mantetsu's Dalian shops for use on Mantetsu lines. Similar to the テンイ8 observation car of the Asia Express, with a streamlined body and air conditioning. Exterior paint was dark green with a gold stripe and a white roof.

=== Other cars ===
- テ1形 - Te-1 class – baggage cars. Three converted from 3rd class coaches in 1916.
- テ2形 - Te-2 class – baggage cars.
- テ3形 - Te-3 class – baggage cars.
- テ4形 - Te-4 class – baggage cars.
- テ5形 - Te-5 class – baggage cars.
- テユ1形 - TeYu-1 class – combination baggage and mail cars. Nineteen imported from the US.
- テユ2形 - TeYu-2 class – combination baggage and mail cars.
- テユ5形 - TeYu-5 class – combination baggage and mail cars.
- テユ7形 - TeYu-7 class – combination baggage and mail cars.
- テユ8形 - TeYu-8 class – combination baggage/mail cars for the Asia Express. Four built at Shahekou Works in 1934. Weight 54.0 t (53.1 long tons; 59.5 short tons), capacity 7.6 t (7.5 long tons; 8.4 short tons) luggage and 6.6 t (6.5 long tons; 7.3 short tons) mail.
- テユ9形 - TeYu-9 class – combination baggage and mail cars.
- イア形 - IA class - "comfort" cars. Dedicated brothel cars introduced in 1934; prior to then, ordinary passenger cars were used. Two ordinary cars, one "comfort sleeper" converted from a 3rd class coach, one "comfort pleasure" car converted from a 2nd class coach, one "comfort diner" converted from a combination 3rd class coach/dining car.
- シケ1形 - ShiKe-1 class – Test cars. Three cars, used for technical research/testing on tracks, bridges, etc.
- シヤ1形 - ShiYa-1 class – Work car. One built.

== Freight cars ==
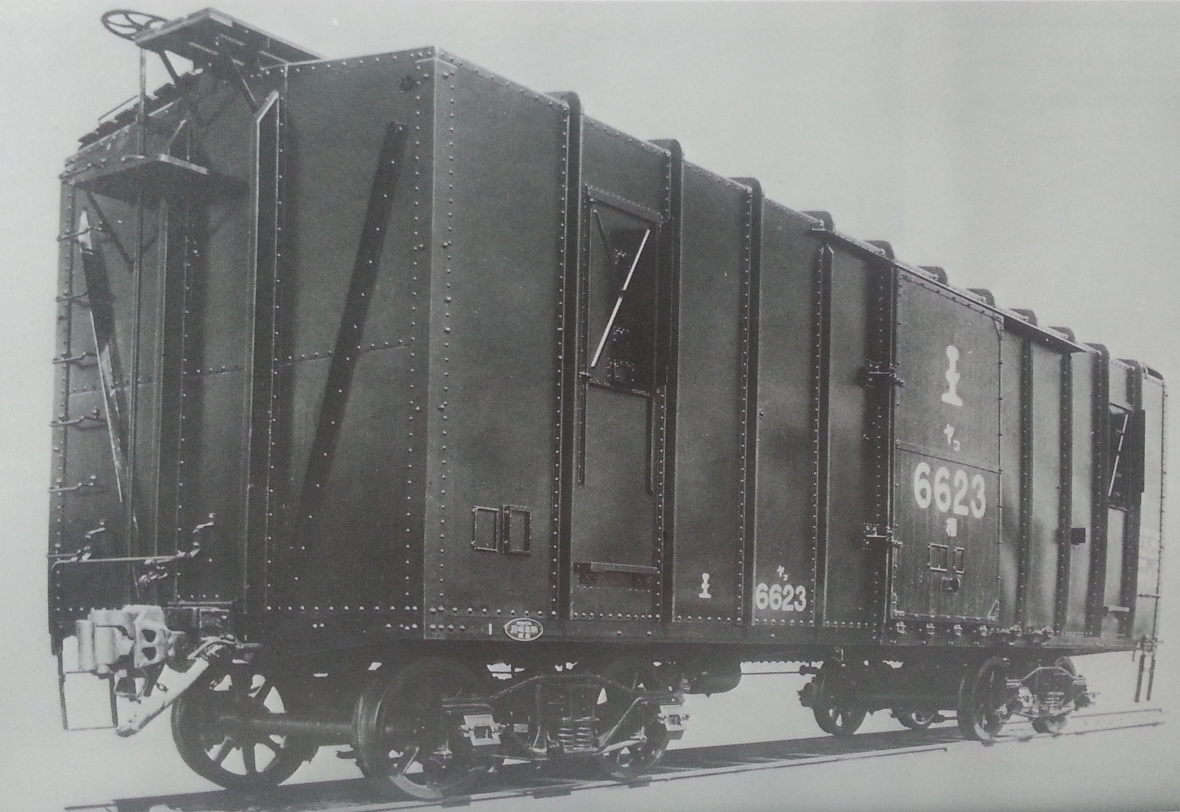
ヤ_{コ} (Ya5) class boxcar of the Manchukuo National Railway

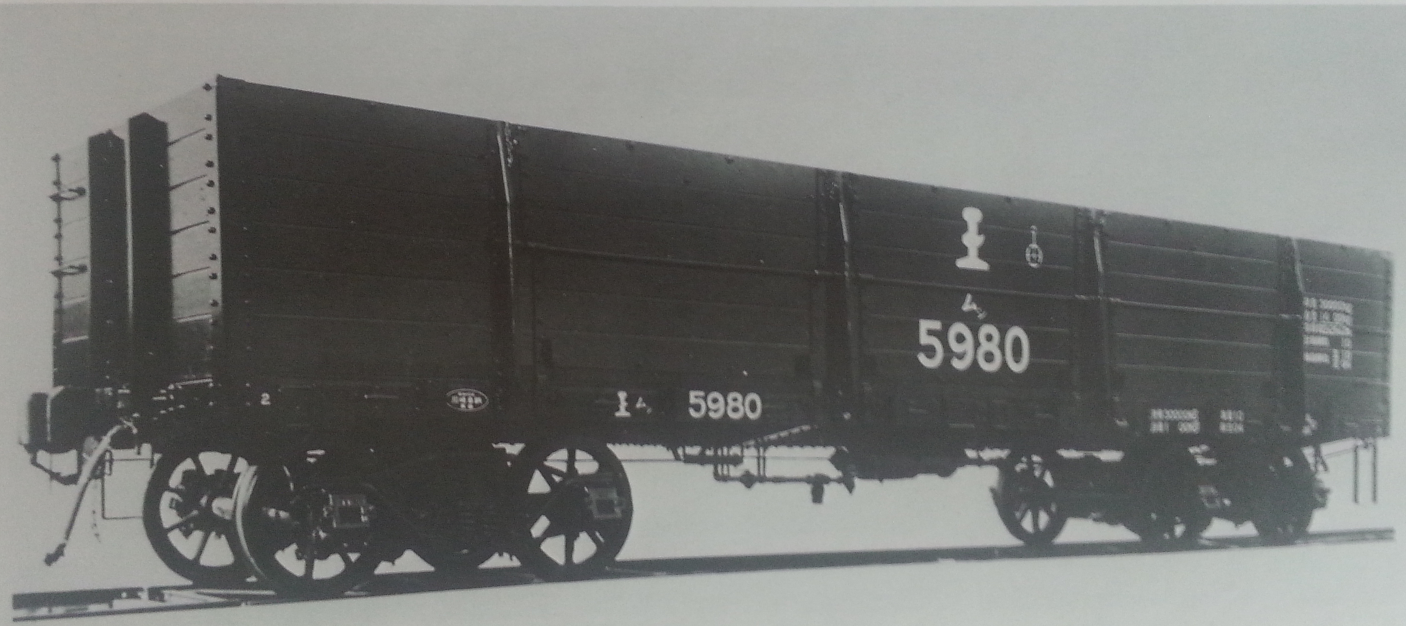
ム_{シ} (Mu4) class gondola of the Manchukuo National Railway

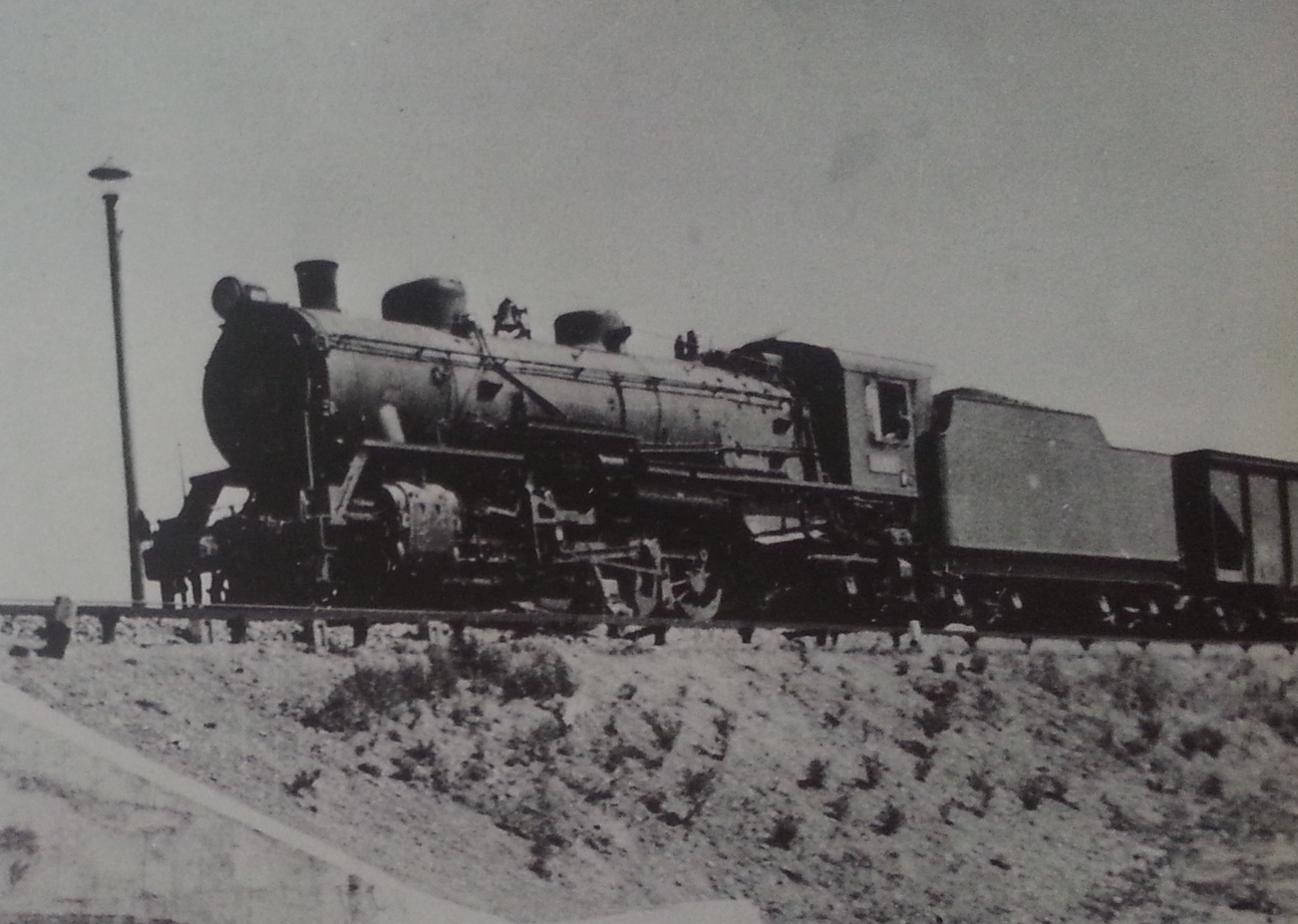
A タ_{ロ} (Ta6) class coal hopper is the first car behind the locomotive

- Boxcars: ヤ_{イ} (Ya1), ヤ_{ニ} (Ya2), ヤ_{サ} (Ya3), ヤ_{シ} (Ya4), ヤ_{コ} (Ya5), ヤ_{ロ} (Ya6), ヤ_{ク} (Ya9) classes. A Ya1 class boxcar, ヤ_{イ}463, is on display at the Pyongyang Railway Museum.
- Ventilated boxcars: フ_{イ} (Fu1), フ_{ニ} (Fu2) class.
- Insulated boxcars: ホ_{イ} (Ho1) class.
- Refrigerator cars: _{イ} (Re1), レ_{ニ} (Re2), レ_{サ} (Re3) classes.
- Livestock cars: ウ_{イ} (U1), ウ_{ニ} (U2) classes.
- Gondolas: ム_{イ} (Mu1), ム_{ニ} (Mu2), ム_{サ} (Mu3), ム_{シ} (Mu4) classes.
- Flatcars: チ_{イ} (Chi1)、チ_{コ} (Chi5), チ_{ロ} (Chi6). The Chi6 class were heavy-duty cars with a depressed centre.
- Coal hoppers: タ_{イ} (Ta1), タニ_{ニ} (Ta2), タ_{サ} (Ta3), タ_{シ} (Ta4), タ_{コ} (Ta5), タ_{ロ} (Ta6), タ_{ナ} (Ta7) classes. The Ta5 class cars were a gondola with drop doors on the bottom and upwards-opening sides; the Ta6 class were true hopper cars, visually similar to the USRA standard design open hopper.
- Ore cars: コ_{イ} (Ko1), コ_{ニ} (Ko2) classes.
- Sand cars: ツ_{イ} (Tsu1), ツ_{ニ} (Tsu2) classes.
- Cinder cars: アシ_{イ} (AShi1) class.
- Bean oil tank cars: マ_{イ} (Ma1), マ_{ニ} (Ma2) classes.
- Heavy oil tank cars: オ_{イ} (O1) class.
- Kerosene tank cars: ケ_{イ} (Ke1) class.
- Paraffin tank cars: ラ_{イ} (Ra1), ラ_{ニ} (Ra2) classes.
- Petroleum tank cars: ア_{イ} (A1), ア_{ニ} (A2) classes.
- Sulphuric acid tank cars: リ_{イ} (Ri1), リ_{ニ} (Ri2) classes
- Tar tank cars: ル_{イ} (Ru1), ル_{ニ} (Ru2) classes.
- Water tank cars: ス_{イ} (Su1), ス_{ニ} (Su2) classes.
- Camp cars: シク_{イ} (ShiKu1) class.
- Cabooses: カ_{イ} (Ka1), カ_{ニ} (Ka2), カ_{サ} (Ka3) classes.
- Inspection cars: キケ_{イ} (KiKe1) class.
- Emergency vehicles: ヒ_{イ} (Hi1), ヒ_{ニ} (Hi2), ヒ_{サ} (Hi3), ヒ_{ハ} (Hi8) classes.
