= China Railways TH1 =

China Railways TH1 Mantetsu Tehoi class (テホイ)
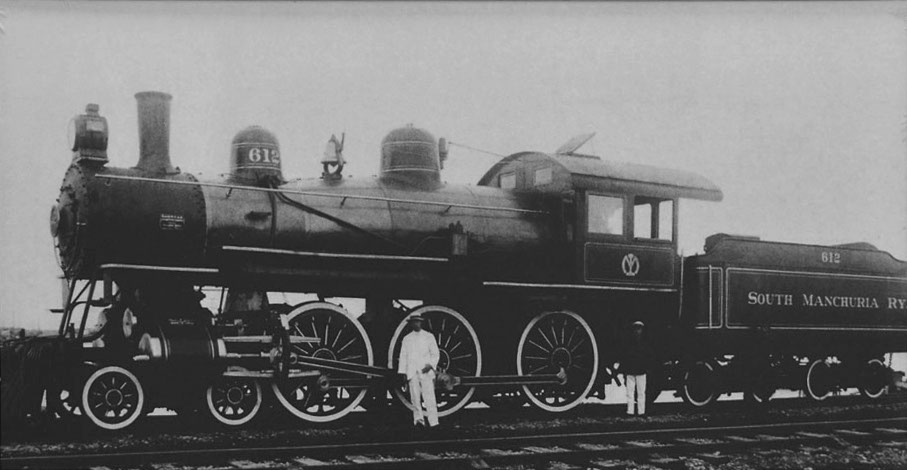
- Mantetsu F1-612 as built.
Type and origin
- Power type: Steam
- Builder: ALCO
- Model: TH1
- Build date: 1908, 1912
- Total produced: 22
Specifications
- Configuration
  - Whyte: 4-6-0
- Gauge: 1,435 mm (4 ft 8 1/2 in)
- Driver dia.: 1,750 mm (5 ft 9 in)
- Fuel type: Coal
- Cylinders: Two, outside
- Cylinder size: 482 mm × 610 mm (19.0 in × 24.0 in)
Career
- Operators: China Railway
- Numbers: 602–619, 620–624, 5650, 5651, 1–15, 501, 502, 16–20
- Disposition: All scrapped

The China Railways TH1 class steam locomotive was a class of 4-6-0 steam locomotives operated by the China Railway. Originally built for the South Manchuria Railway (Mantetsu), some were also operated by the Manchukuo National Railway. The "Teho" name came from the American naming system for steam locomotives, under which locomotives with 4-6-0 wheel arrangement were called "Ten-Wheeler".

== History ==
The Tehoi class can be subdivided into two distinct subclasses, the Tehoi class and the Mantetsu Tehoni class, which should not be confused with the Manchukuo National Tehoni class.

=== Tehoi class (テホイ) ===
In 1908, Mantetsu ordered seventeen locomotives from ALCo in the United States for express and ordinary passenger train duties on the mainline. Built at ALCo's Schenectady works and designated class F1, from 1911 they were used also on express trains on the Dalian–Lüshun line, and on the Anfeng Line between Fengtian and Andong. With the introduction of a new classification system in 1920 they became class Tehoi (テホイ), and between then and 1926 they were rebuilt with superheaters. In 1927, one engine was leased to the Sitao Railway, which in 1933 was nationalised along with several other private railways to create the Manchukuo National Railway, and in the same year, four were transferred to the Fushun Coal Mine, which was under Mantetsu's control. In 1931 three of the locomotives sent to Fushun were returned in exchange for a Sorii class engine, and in that year some were loaned to the Jinfu Railway. With the establishment of the Manchukuo National Railway in 1933, two were transferred to the MNR, where they were designated Tehosa (テホサ) class.

Owner	Class & numbers (1907–1920)	Class & numbers (1920–1938)	Class & numbers (1938–1945)	Notes
Mantetsu	F1 602–F1 619	テホイ602–テホイ619	テホイ1–テホイ15	
Manchukuo National	-	テホサ5650, テホサ5651	テホイ501, テホイ502	Transferred from Mantetsu in 1933

=== Tehoni class (テホニ) ===
After the reconstruction of the Anfeng Line in 1911, a thrice-weekly international express train between Fengtian and Gyeongseong, Korea was introduced. As the existing locomotives insufficient in quantity, Mantetsu ordered five new engines from ALCo in 1912 to augment the fleet. Built at ALCO's Richmond, Virginia plant, they were designated class F1 like the 1908 units, though they were not identical to those, and in the 1920 reclassification they became Tehoni (テホニ) class. Between 1920 and 1926 they were rebuilt with superheaters. Used on both express and ordinary passenger trains, some were loaned to the Jinfu Railway in 1931.

Owner	Class & numbers (1912–1920)	Class & numbers (1920–1938)	Class & numbers (1938–1945)
Mantetsu	F1 620–F1 624	テホニ620–テホニ624	テホイ16–テホイ20

Under the new unified classification system introduced in 1938, the Mantetsu Tehoi class, the Mantetsu Tehoni class, and the Manchukuo National Tehosa class locomotives were collectively designated Tehoi class.

== Postwar ==
All 22 engines of both subclasses survived the Second Sino-Japanese War, and at the end of the war were assigned to the Dalian (9), Fengtian (5), Jinzhou (5) and Qiqihar (3) depots, and were taken over by the Republic of China Railway. Following the establishment of the People's Republic and the current China Railway, they were designated class ㄊㄏ一 (TH1) in 1951, becoming class TH1 (written in Pinyin instead of Zhuyin) in 1959. Retired at 1990.

== Class Specifications ==
	Tehoi (as built)	Tehoi (rebuilt)	Tehoni (as built)	Tehoni (rebuilt)
Builder	ALCO (Schenectady)		ALCO (Richmond)	
Build date	1908	1920–1926	1912	1920–1926
Driver diameter	1,753 mm (69.0 in)	1,750 mm (69 in)	1,753 mm (69.0 in)	1,750 mm (69 in)
Loco Weight	72.00 t (70.86 long tons)	72.84 t (71.69 long tons)	72.00 t (70.86 long tons)	71.53 t (70.40 long tons)
Adhesive weight	55.10 t (54.23 long tons)	56.23 t (55.34 long tons)	55.10 t (54.23 long tons)	54.87 t (54.00 long tons)
Cylinder size	483 mm × 610 mm (19.0 in × 24.0 in)	483 mm × 610 mm (19.0 in × 24.0 in)	483 mm × 610 mm (19.0 in × 24.0 in)	483 mm × 610 mm (19.0 in × 24.0 in)
Boiler pressure	14.0 kgf/cm^{2} (199 psi)	14.1 kgf/cm^{2} (201 psi)	14.0 kgf/cm^{2} (199 psi)	14.1 kgf/cm^{2} (201 psi)
Firegrate area	3.01 m^{2} (32.4 sq ft)	2.94 m^{2} (31.6 sq ft)	3.01 m^{2} (32.4 sq ft)	2.95 m^{2} (31.8 sq ft)
Operator	South Manchuria Railway; Manchukuo National Railway; China Railway		South Manchuria Railway; China Railway	
Numbers in class	17		5	

== Bibliography ==
- Whitehouse, Patrick Bruce (1988). China By Rail. London: Stanley Paul. ISBN 9780091737092 – via Internet Archive.
