= Zhongxing railway station =

Zhongxing railway station may refer to:

- Zhongxing railway station (Dujiangyan), a planned railway station of Chengdu–Dujiangyan Intercity Railway in Chengdu, Sichuan, China
- Zhongxing railway station (Fengcheng), a railway station of Shenyang–Dandong Railway in Fengcheng, Liaoning, China
