= TH10 =

TH10 may refer to:

== Places ==
- Uttaradit (Thai: อุตรดิตถ์; FIPS code TH10), a province of Thailand
- TH 10 (MN) (Truck Highway 10), Minnesota, USA; a state road

== Products ==
- China Railways TH10, a steam locomotive class
- CaseLabs TH10, a computer case fan from CaseLabs
- Hino TH10, a truck in the Hino TH-series
- Taurus TH10, a bullet in 10mm Auto ammunition size

== Other uses ==
- T^{H}_{10}, a chemical compound, a hydrogen silsesquioxane
- TH10 pretectal thalamic neuron, used for vision in toads
- Th10 paraplegia, see H3 (classification)
- Mountain of Faith, often abbreviated as 'TH10', a 2007 bullet hell video game

== See also ==
- THX (disambiguation)
