= Renkyō Line =

Railway line in China

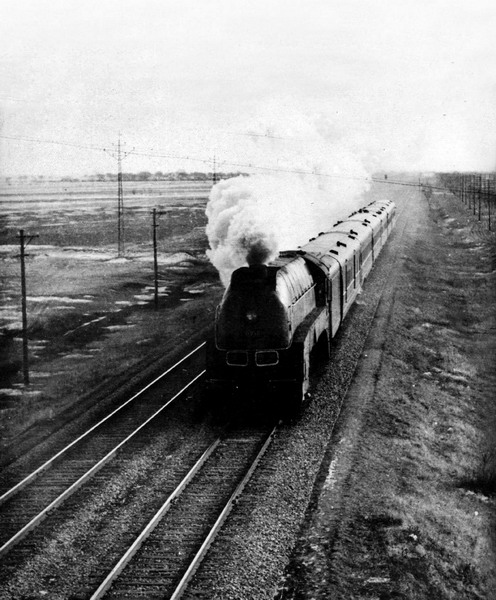
- The "Asia Express" running on the Renkyō Line.

Overview
- Native name: 連京線 (Renkyōsen, Liánjīngxiàn)
- Status: see article
- Owner: South Manchuria Railway
- Locale: Manchukuo, Kwantung Leased Territory
- Termini: Dairen; Xinjing

Service
- Type: Heavy rail, Regional rail

History
- Opened: 1 September 1907 (see article)
- Closed: 1955 (see article)

Technical
- Line length: 701.4 km (435.8 mi)
- Track gauge: 1,435 mm (4 ft 8 1/2 in) standard gauge
- Old gauge: 1,520 mm (4 ft 11 27/32 in) Russian gauge

The Renkyō Line (連京線; in Chinese Lianjing Line, Liánjīng Xiàn) was the primary trunk line of the South Manchuria Railway from 1907 to 1945. The 701.4 km (435.8 mi) line ran between Dalian (Dairen) and Changchun (Xinjing).

The rights to manage this railway line was one of the main concessions that Japan acquired from Russia after the Russo-Japanese War. It played an important role in Japan's control of Manchuria, as a key connection in traffic between east Asia and Europe and as a means of conveying resources mined inland to the coast. The line's importance to freight traffic decreased somewhat after the opening of the shorter North Chosen Line via the Korean port of Rajin. It remained important to passenger traffic, however, as the "Asia Express" Dalian–Harbin limited express train, inaugurated in 1943, operated on this line between Dalian and Xinjing. In August 1945, after Japan's defeat in the Pacific War, control of this and all other Mantetsu lines was passed to the Sino-Soviet China Changchun Railway.

== History ==
The Renkyō Line began as the "South Manchuria Line" of the Russian-owned Chinese Eastern Railway running from Harbin to Port Arthur. Russia obtained the rights to build this line from Qing China; work began on 27 March 1898, and the 1,524 mm (5 ft 0 in) broad gauge line was opened to traffic in July 1903. Following Russia's defeat in the Russo-Japanese War, Japan gained the rights to operate the Harbin–Lüshun (Ryojun) section of the CER; the line was then converted from Russian broad gauge to the 1,067 mm (3 ft 6.0 in) Cape gauge used in Japan, to allow the use of rolling stock from Japan. The line was operated by the Imperial Japanese Army until it was taken over by the South Manchuria Railway Company (Mantetsu), established on 26 November 1906. Mantetsu immediately set to regauging the line again, this time from Cape gauge to 1,435 mm (4 ft 8.5 in) standard gauge.

Mantetsu created the Renkyō Line - then called the Manchu Main Line (満洲本線, Manshū Honsen, Mǎnzhōu Běnxiàn) - between Dairen and Mengjiatun (Mōkaton) on 1 April 1907, and extending it to Changchun (Chōshun) on 1 September 1907. Regauging of the entire line was completed in 1908, and on 27 May of that year through service between Dairen and Chōshun began on the all-standard gauge line. The Anpō Line, which connected to the Renkyō Line at Fengtian (Hōten) and was initially built as a 762 mm (2 ft 6.0 in) narrow-gauge line, was converted to standard gauge in November 1911, and from 15 June 1912 direct operation between Busan and Changchun began, via the Chosen Government Railway's Gyeongbu and Gyeongui Lines, the Anpō Line, and the Renkyō Line from Fengtian to Changchun. Double-tracking of the line from Sujiatun (Sokaton) to Dairen was completed on 27 October 1908, but it wasn't until 30 November 1918 that the section from Sujiatun to Fengtian was doubled. Between 1919 and 1926 the entire line was relaid with 100-lb/yd (50 kg/m) rail. The first colour light signals for automatic block signalling were installed on the Dalian–Jinzhou (Kinshū) and Fengtian–Sujiatun sections on 12 February 1924, and the entire section from Dalian to Fengtian received automatic blocking by 5 November 1933. On 15 July 1927, the line's name was changed from Manchu Main Line to Renchō Line (連長線; "Lianchang Line", Liáncháng Xiàn, in Chinese).

Using the Mukden Incident as a pretext to invade Manchuria, Japan created the puppet state of Manchukuo in March 1932; Changchun was designated the capital city, and was renamed Xinjing (Shinkyō), and the line was renamed once again, becoming the Renkyō Line at that time. The "Asia Express", a world-class limited express train, was introduced on 26 September 1934 between Dalian and Xinjing. The Manchukuo National Railway, which had taken over the remainder of the Chinese Eastern Railway, finished the conversion of the Jingbin Line from Xinjing to Harbin from broad gauge to standard gauge on 31 August 1935, and from 1 September the Asia Express service was extended to Harbin.

Japan's deteriorating situation in the Pacific War affected the line significantly. The Asia Express was suspended at the end of February 1943. The loss of air and sea superiority led to a drastic reduction in freight traffic to the port at Dalian, being instead redirected to Korean ports, via the North Chosen Line to the ports of Rajin and Unggi, and via the Anpō Line and the Chosen Government Railway to Busan. Between 1 August and 3 November 1944, the second track of the 180.3 km (112.0 mi) section between Sanshilibao (Sanjūrihō) and Dashiqiao (Daisekikyō) was removed, with the railways being used to upgrade Mantetsu's Anpō Line and the Manchukuo National Railway's Fengshan Line from Fengtian to Shanhaiguan.

On 9 August 1945, the Soviet Union invaded Manchukuo, and on the 14th, the USSR and the Republic of China signed a treaty of friendship; the signing of the treaty was announced on the 27th. Under the terms of this treaty, a Sino-Soviet joint enterprise was formed, called the China Changchun Railway, to operate the Renkyō Line (known as the Changda Line after Xinjing reverted to its original name, Changchun) and a number of lines formerly owned by the Manchukuo National Railway, including the Xinjing–Harbin Jingbin Line and the Harbin–Manzhouli Binzhou Line. Mantetsu was formally dissolved on 30 September 1945. The China Changchun Railway was transferred to China Railway in 1955, after which the Changda Line was split up, with the Dalian–Shenyang section becoming the Shenda Railway, and the Shenyang–Changchun section becoming part of the Beijing–Harbin Jingha Railway.

== Services ==
In addition to many freight trains and local passenger trains, a number of domestic and international express and limited express trains operated on this line. Most important of these was the flagship "Asia Express", running between Dalian and Harbin from 1934 to 1943, which was comparable to the most prestigious European and American express trains of the day, which featured several world firsts, such as fully enclosed, air-conditioned carriages. The "Hato" express operated from 1932 to 1945, running between Dalian and Xinjing. There were two international express services serving Korea and Manchukuo: the "Hikari" between Busan and Harbin, which operated from 1934 to 1945, and the "Nozomi", which ran between Busan and Xinjing.

== Route ==
In the "Stops" columns, ● indicates a stop made by all trains of that category, ▲ indicates a stop made only by some trains of that category, ○ indicates a stop made by all trains of that category after October 1939, and | indicates that trains of that category did not stop at that station. Ordinary passenger trains stopped at all stations except signal stops.

Distance		Station name			Stops			
Total; km	S2S; km	Japanese	Chinese	Post-1945	Exp.	Ltd.	Opened	Connections
0.0	0.0	Dairen 大連	Dalian	Dalian	●	●	1903	Gusai Line
4.0	4.0	Shakakō 沙河口	Shahekou	Shahekou	▲	｜	1909	Futō Line, Nyūzen Line
8.9	4.9	Shūsuishi 周水子	Zhoushuizi	Zhoushuizi	▲	｜	1907	Ryojun Line
15.5	6.6	Nankanrei 南関嶺	Nanguanling	Nanguanling	｜	｜		
23.2	7.7	Entō 塩島	Yandao	Yandao	｜	｜	1911	
27.7	4.5	Daibōshin 大房身	Dafangshen	Dafangshen	｜	｜	1903	
32.5	4.8	Kinshū 金州	Jinzhou	Jinzhou	●	｜	1903	Kinjō Line (zh)
46.4	13.9	Nijūridai 二十里台	Ershirlitai	Ershirlitai	｜	｜		
55.8	9.4	Sanjūrihō 三十里堡	Sanshilibao	Sanshilibao	｜	｜		
66.1	10.3	Sekika 石河	Shihe	Shihe	｜	｜		
77.2	11.1	Furanten 普蘭店	Pulandian	Pulandian	●	｜	1903	
94.1	6.9	Tenka 田家	Tianjia	Tianjia	｜	｜		
105.0	10.9	Gabōten 瓦房店	Wafangdian	Wafangdian	●	｜	1903	
112.7	7.7	Ōka 王家	Wangjia	Wangjia	｜	｜		
124.1	11.4	Tokuriji 得利寺	Delisi	Delisi	｜	｜		
130.7	6.6	Shōshu 松樹	Songshu	Songshu	｜	｜		
146.3	15.6	Bankarei 万家嶺	Wanjialing	Wanjialing	｜	｜		
160.5	14.2	Kyokaton 許家屯	Xujiatun	Xujiatun	｜	｜	1938	
168.0	7	Kyūsai 九寨	Jiuzhai	Jiuzhai	｜	｜		
173.9	5.9	Rizan 梨山	Lishan	-	｜	｜		Closed 1 April 1944
178.2	4.3	Ugakujō 熊岳城	Xiongyuecheng	Xiongyuecheng	●	｜	1903	
188.2	10.0	Rokaton 芦家屯	Lujiatun	Lujiatun	｜	｜		
199.0	10.8	Sakō 沙崗	Shagang	Shagang	｜	｜		
209.6	11	Kaihei 蓋平	Gaiping	Gaizhou	▲	｜	1903	
218.3	8.7	Hakuki 白旗	Baiqi	-	｜	｜		Closed 1 April 1944
228.3	10.0	Taiheizan 太平山	Taipingshan	Taipingshan	｜	｜		
239.5	11.2	Daisekikyō 大石橋	Dashiqiao	Dashiqiao	●	●	1900	Eikō Line
247.1	7.6	Funsui 分水	Fenshui	Fenshui	｜	｜		
255.1	8.0	Tazan 他山	Tashan	Tashan	｜	｜		
263		Tōōzan 唐王山	Tangwangshan	Tangwangshan	｜	｜	1935	
271.6	~8	Kaijō 海城	Haicheng	Haicheng	●	｜	1903	
280.7	9.1	Nantai 南台	Nantai	Nantai	｜	｜	1907	
285.5	4.8	Kansenfu 甘泉鋪	Ganquanpu	-	｜	｜		Closed 1 September 1944
292.8	7.3	Tōkōshi 湯崗子	Tanggangzi	Tanggangzi	●	｜	1907	
302.2	9.4	Senzan 千山	Qianshan	Jiupu	｜	｜	1905	
307.3	5.1	Anzan 鞍山	Anshan	Anshan	●	○	1918	
312.6	5.3	Rissan 立山	Lishan	Lishan	｜	｜		
		Dairakuton-shingōsho 大樂屯信号所	Daletun signal stop		｜	｜		
317.6	5.0	Reizan 霊山	Lingshan	Lingshan	｜	｜	1907	
321.7	4.1	Shuzan 首山	Shoushan	Shoushan	｜	｜	1907	
332.3	10.6	Ryōyō 遼陽	Liaoyang	Liaoyang	●	｜	1899	Liaogong Line (zh)
339.0	6.7	Taishika 太子河	Taizihe	-	｜	｜	1931	Closed 1 September 1944
345.2	6.2	Chōdaishi 張台子	Zhangtaizi	Zhangtaizi	｜	｜	1907	
354.6	9.4	Endai 煙台	Yantai	Dengta	｜	｜	1903	Endai Colliery Line
362.9	8.3	Jūrika 十里河	Shilihe	Shilihe	｜	｜	1919	
371.7	8.8	Shaka 沙河	Shahe	Linshengpu	｜	｜	1911	
381.0	9.3	Sokaton 蘇家屯	Sujiatun	Sujiatun	●	｜	1903	Anpō Line, Bushun Line (zh)
388.0	7.0	Konga 渾河	Hunhe	Hunhe	｜	｜	1902	Anpō Line, Kon'yu Connecting Line, MNR Fengshan Line
392.1	4.1	Minami-Hōten 南奉天	South Fengtian	Shenyang South	｜	｜		
396.6	4.5	Hōten 奉天	Fengtian	Shenyang	●	●	1899	Anpō Line, MNR Fengshan Line, MNR Fengji Line (zh)
398	~3	Kita-Hōten 北奉天	North Fengtian	Shenyang North	｜	｜	1911	MNR Huanggutun Connecting Line
409.7	~11	Bunkanton 文官屯	Wenguantun	Wenguantun	｜	｜	1907	
417.2	7.5	Kosekidai 虎石台	Hushitai	Hushitai	｜	｜	1901	
422.1	4.9	Tōsanka 唐三家	Tangsanjia	-	｜	｜		Closed 1 September 1944
429.3	7.2	Shinseiji 新城子	Xinchengzi	Xinchengzi	｜	｜	1908	
441.3	12.0	Shindaiji 新台子	Xintaizi	Xintaizi	｜	｜	1899	
448.8	7.5	Ransekizan 乱石山	Luanshishan	Luanshishan	｜	｜	1907	
458.5	9.7	Tokushōdai 得勝台	Deshengtai	Deshengtai	｜	｜	1907	
468.0	9.5	Tetsurei 鐵嶺	Tieling	Tieling	●	｜	1900	
478.7	10.7	Heichōho 平頂堡	Pingdingbao	Pingdingbao	｜	｜	1907	
482.6	3.9	Santōhō 山頭堡	Shantoubao	-	｜	｜		Closed 1 September 1944
489.5	6.9	Chūko 中固	Zhonggu	Zhonggu	｜	｜	1907	
501.5	12.0	Kaigen 開原	Kaiyuan	Kaiyuan	●	｜	1901	Kaifeng Railway (ja) Kaifeng Line
512.3	10.8	Kinkōji 金溝子	Jingouzi	Jingouzi	｜	｜	1909	
522.4	10.1	Bachūka 馬仲河	Mazhonghe	Mazhonghe	｜	｜	1909	
532.6	10.2	Shōto 昌圖	Changtu	Changtu	▲	｜	1901	
540.0	7.4	Mansei 満井	Manjing	Manjing	｜	｜	1907	
547.0	7.0	Sentō 泉頭	Quantou	Quantou	｜	｜	1911	
557.6	10.6	Sōbyōji 雙廟子	Shuangmiaozi	Shuangmiaozi	｜	｜	1901	
566.7	9.1	Enkōji 垣勾子	Maojiadian	Maojiadian	｜	｜	1911	
573.2	6.5	Bōgyūshō 虻牛哨	Mengniushao	Mengniushao	｜	｜	1911	
585.9	12.7	Shihei 四平; Shiheigai 四平街 (to 1941)	Siping	Siping	●	●	1902	MNR Shibai Line (zh), MNR Heisei Line (zh)
592.4	6.5	Yōmokurin 楊木林	Yangmulin	Yangmulin	｜	｜	1919	
601.5	9.1	Jūkahō 十家堡	Shijiabao	Shijiabao	｜	｜	1909	
612.3	10.8	Kakukaten 郭家店	Guojiadian	Guojiadian	｜	｜	1901	
623.0	10.7	Saika 蔡家	Caijia	Caijia	｜	｜	1911	
631.5	8.5	Daiyuju 大楡樹	Dayushu	Dayushu	｜	｜	1908	
639.4	7.9	Kōshurei 公主嶺	Gongzhuling	Gongzhuling	●	｜	1901	
650.2	10.8	Rubōshi 劉房子	Liufangzi	Liufangzi	｜	｜	1908	
661.0	10.8	Tōkaton 陶家屯	Taojiatun	Taojiatun	｜	｜	1916	
671.2	10.2	Hankaton 范家屯	Fanjiatun	Fanjiatun	｜	｜	1901	
681.6	10.4	Daiton 大屯	Datun	Datun	｜	｜	1907	
692.7	11.1	Mōkaton 孟家屯	Mengjiatun	Mengjiatun	｜	｜		
696.4	3.7	Minami-Shinkyō 南新京	South Xinjing	Changchun South	▲	｜	1906	
		Sensō-shingōba 千早信号場	Qianzao signal stop		｜	｜		
701.4	5.0	Shinkyō 新京	Xinjing	Changchun	●	●	1907	MNR Jingbai Line (zh), MNR Jingbin Line, MNR Jingtu Line (zh),
