= China Railways AM1 =

China Railways AM1 Mantetsu Amei class (アメイ)
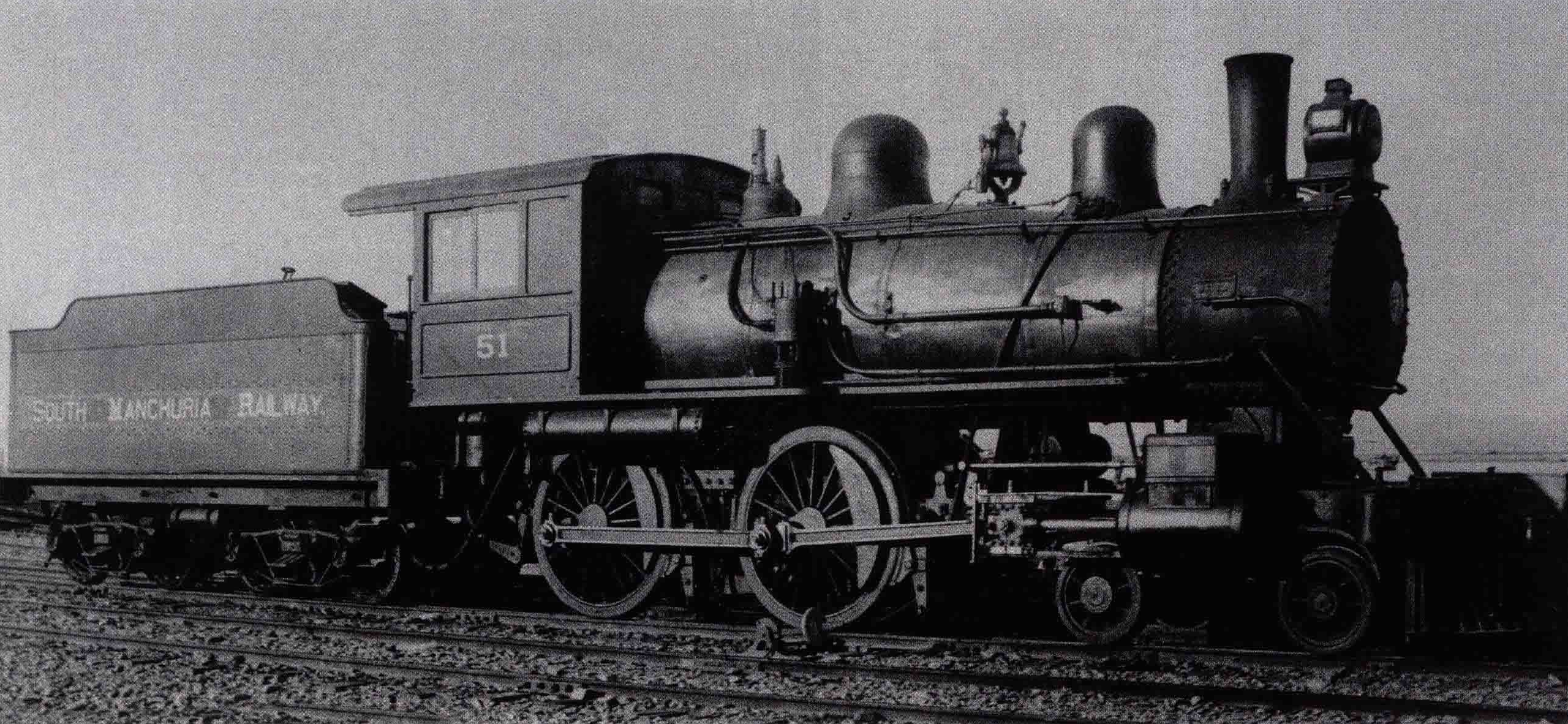
- Mantetsu アメ (Ame) Type, No. 51
Type and origin
- Power type: Steam
- Builder: American Locomotive Company
- Build date: 1906
- Total produced: 4
Specifications
- Configuration
  - Whyte: 4-4-0
- Gauge: 1,435 mm (4 ft 8 1/2 in) standard gauge
- Driver dia.: 1,727 mm (67.99 in)
- Adhesive weight: 40.30 t (39.66 long tons; 44.42 short tons)
- Loco weight: 58.30 t (57.38 long tons; 64.26 short tons)
- Fuel type: Coal
- Firebox
  - Grate area: 2.42 m^{2} (26.0 sq ft)
- Boiler pressure: 12.7 kgf/cm^{2} (181 psi; 1,245 kPa)
- Cylinders: Two, outside
- Cylinder size: 457 mm × 660 mm (18.0 in × 26.0 in)
Career
- Operators: South Manchuria Railway; China Railway
- Class: SMR: A (1916–1920); SMR: アメ (1920–1938); SMR: アメイ (1938–1945); CR: AM1
- Number in class: 4
- Numbers: SMR: 50–53 (1908–1938); SMR: アメイ1–4 (1938–1945); CR: AM1

The China Railways AM1 class locomotives were a class of 4-4-0 "Eight-Wheeler" type passenger steam locomotives operated by China Railways, originally built for the South Manchuria Railway (Mantetsu). The "Ame" name came from the American naming system for steam locomotives, under which locomotives with 4-4-0 wheel arrangement were called "American".

== History ==
The Amei class was part of the first group of locomotives ordered by Mantetsu after the conversion to standard gauge. They were bought from ALCO of the United States, setting a precedent of importing locomotives - primarily from the US - over the subsequent decade and a half. The four locomotives that Mantetsu bought were originally built for the Chicago Southern Railway (later part of the Milwaukee Road).

Designated class A under Mantetsu's first classification system, they were used primarily as power on ordinary passenger trains on both the main line between Dalian and Changchun (later Xinjing), and on the Anfeng Line. Redesignated Ame (アメ) class in 1920, in 1927, all four were rented out to the Sitao Railway, remaining there until the Sitao Railway, along with other privately owned railways, was nationalised to form the Manchukuo National Railway in 1933. They returned to Mantetsu at that time, serving primarily on the Yingkou Branch Line between Dashiqiao on the mainline and Yingkou, and occasionally pulling light trains on the mainline between Dalian and Xinjing. They became Amei class in 1938.

Owner	Class & numbers (pre-1920)	Class & numbers (1920–1938)	Class & numbers (1938–1945)	Builder
Mantetsu	A 50–53	アメ50–アメ53	アメイ1–アメイ4	ALCO

== Postwar ==
All four were assigned to the Fengtian Railway Bureau at the end of the Pacific War, and were taken over by the Republic of China Railway. After the establishment of the People's Republic of China, they were taken over by the current China Railway, which designated them class AM1 in 1951. the class was retired in 1955.
