= China Railways KD1 =

China Railways KD1 Mantetsu Sorii class (ソリイ) Manchukuo National Sorina class (ソリナ)
- Mantetsu ソリイ1043 with a spreader at Fushun in 1932
Type and origin
- Power type: Steam
- Builder: ALCo (Paterson Works)
- Build date: 1907–1908
- Total produced: 41
Specifications
- Configuration
  - Whyte: 2-8-0
- Gauge: 1,435 mm (4 ft 8 1/2 in)
- Driver dia.: 1,270 mm (50 in)
- Adhesive weight: As built: 69.70 t (68.60 long tons); Rebuilt: 69.97 t (68.86 long tons)
- Loco weight: As built: 77.80 t (76.57 long tons); Rebuilt: 78.56 t (77.32 long tons)
- Fuel type: Coal
- Firebox
  - Grate area: As built: 3.18 m^{2} (34.2 sq ft); Rebuilt: 3.16 m^{2} (34.0 sq ft)
- Boiler pressure: 12.7 kgf/cm^{2} (181 psi)
- Cylinders: Two, outside
- Cylinder size: As built: 559 mm × 660 mm (22.0 in × 26.0 in); Rebuilt: 560 mm × 660 mm (22 in × 26 in)
Career
- Operators: South Manchuria Railway; Sitao Railway; Manchukuo National Railway; China Railway
- Class: SMR: H1 (1907–1920); SMR: ソリイ (1920–1938); MNR: ソリナ (1933–1938); SMR/MNR: ソリイ (1938–1945); CR: KD1
- Number in class: 41
- Numbers: SMR: 3–7 (1907); SMR: 1002–1032, 1053–1067; subs. 1002–1047 (1907–1920); SMR: ソリイ1002–1047 (1920–1938); MNR: ソリナ6200–6214 (1933–1938); SMR: ソリイ1–26 (1935–1945); MNR: ソリイ501–515 (1938–1945)
- Disposition: All scrapped

The China Railways KD1 class locomotives were a class of 2-8-0 "Consolidation" type steam locomotives operated by China Railway, originally built for the South Manchuria Railway (Mantetsu) and the Manchukuo National Railway by ALCo of the United States in 1907 and 1908. The "Sori" name comes from the American naming system for steam locomotives, in which the 2-8-0 wheel arrangement is called "Consolidation".

== History ==
After ordering two 2-8-0 tender locomotives from ALCO in 1906 which became the class H, Mantetsu returned to ALCO again for more, receiving five new engines in 1907 from ALCO's Cooke works in New Jersey. Initially numbered 3 through 7, these became class H1 in the new classification system introduced that year, under which system they were renumbered 1002 through 1006, and through the end of 1908 a total of 46 were delivered, numbered 1002–1032 and 1053–1067; they were soon renumbered 1002 through 1047. Initially used only on the mainline, from 1912 they were also used on the Anfeng Line on both goods trains and mixed trains. In 1920, another change to Mantetsu's classification system led to the H1 class becoming the Sorii class (ソリイ), whilst retaining their previous numbers. Between 1923 and 1925 they were rebuilt with superheaters, and between 1927 and 1931, seventeen were transferred to the Fushun Coal Mine. In 1931, seven were loaned to the Sitao Railway, and during the time of the Mukden Incident, some were used to pull military trains and armoured trains. In 1933, number 1002 was transferred to the army to be used to build a prototype for an armoured train. Between 1933 and 1936, fifteen were transferred to the Manchukuo National Railway where they were designated Sorina class (ソリナ), and between 1934 and 1936, Mantetsu assigned some to work on the North Chosen Line. With the introduction of the final new classification scheme, the Mantetsu Sorii and Manchukuo National Sorina classes were unified as the Sorii class, with the Mantetsu engines numbered 1–9, and the Manchukuo National units becoming numbers 501–515. In 1942, the engines that had been transferred to the Fushun mines were returned to Mantetsu, becoming numbers 10 through 26.

Owner	Class & numbers (1907)	Class & numbers (1907–1920)	Class & numbers (1920–1938)	Class & numbers (1938–1945)
Mantetsu	3–7	H1-1002–H1-1032, H1-1053–H1-1067 later H1-1002–H1-1047	ソリイ1002–ソリイ1047	ソリイ1–ソリイ26
Manchukuo National	-	-	ソリナ6200–ソリナ6214	ソリイ501–ソリイ515

== Postwar ==
After the end of the Pacific War, 23 Sorii class locomotives remained on the rosters of Mantetsu and Manchukuo National, with the other 18 thought to have been scrapped or transferred to other railways, including the North China Transportation Company. Of the 23, five were assigned to each of the Jinzhou and Qiqihar Railway Bureaux, four to the Mudanjiang bureau and one to the Harbin bureau, three were on loan to the Construction Office, three were on loan to other railways, with the disposition of the remaining two being unclear; these 23 were taken over by the Republic of China Railway. After the establishment of the People's Republic of China, these locomotives were designated class KD1. This class retired 1990.
