= THX (disambiguation) =

THX, ThX or thx may refer to:

- THX, an American audio company, sound certification and standard
  - Deep Note, the THX trademark stinger sound
- THX 1138, a film by George Lucas
- Electronic Labyrinth: THX 1138 4EB, a film by George Lucas
- thx: "Thanks" in SMS language
- Oi language (ISO 639 language code thx), an Austroasiatic language found in Laos
- Turukhansk Airport (IATA airport code THX), Turukhansk. Krasnoyarsk, Russia
- ThX or Thorium X, a historic name for the radium isotope radium-224
- THX, a Thai girl group

== See also ==
- TH10 (disambiguation)
- Thanks (disambiguation)
