= China Railways TH10 =

Class of 4-6-0 passenger steam locomotives by China Railway

China Railways TH10 Mantetsu F class MNR Tehoni class (テホニ)
Type and origin
- Power type: Steam
- Builder: American Locomotive Works
- Build date: 1906
- Total produced: 2
Specifications
- Configuration
  - Whyte: 4-6-0
- Gauge: 1,435 mm (4 ft 8 1/2 in)
- Driver dia.: 1,473 mm (58.0 in)
- Adhesive weight: 52.60 t (51.77 long tons)
- Loco weight: 65.80 t (64.76 long tons)
- Fuel type: Coal
- Firebox
  - Grate area: 3.58 m^{2} (38.5 sq ft)
- Boiler pressure: 13.4 kgf/cm^{2} (191 psi)
- Cylinders: Two, outside
- Cylinder size: 483 mm × 660 mm (19.0 in × 26.0 in)
Career
- Operators: South Manchuria Railway; Jichang Railway; Jichang Jidun Railway; Manchukuo National Railway; China Railway
- Class: SMR: F (1907–1918); MNR: テホニ (1933–1945); CR: ㄊㄏ十 (1951–1959); CR: TH10 (1959–)
- Number in class: 2
- Numbers: SMR: 100–101 (1906–1907); SMR: 600–601 (1908–1918); JR/JJR: 200–201 (1918–1933); MNR: テホニ5621–5622 (1933–1938); MNR: テホニ501–502 (1938–1945); CR: ?

The China Railways TH10 class steam locomotive was a class of 4-6-0 passenger steam locomotives operated by the China Railway. Originally among the first locomotives ordered by the South Manchuria Railway (Mantetsu), they were later operated by the privately owned Jichang Jidun Railway and its successor, the Manchukuo National Railway, which designated them the Tehoni class. The "Teho" name came from the American naming system for steam locomotives, under which locomotives with a 4-6-0 wheel arrangement were called "Ten-Wheelers".

These locomotives should not be confused with the Mantetsu Teho-ni class engines, which were reclassified as the Teho-i class in 1938.

== History ==
After rebuilding its lines to standard gauge in 1906, Mantetsu needed new locomotives and placed several orders with American builders. One of these orders was placed with ALCO for four 4-4-0 (Amei class) and two 4-6-0 passenger locomotives. These were initially numbered 100 and 101, and with the introduction of Mantetsu's 1907 classification system, they were designated class F and renumbered 600 and 601. These four locomotives were originally built for an American customer but delivered to Manchuria instead; according to Mantetsu records, the original customer was the Boston & Maine Railroad, but according to ALCO records, they were - like the Amei class 4-4-0s - originally built for the Chicago Southern Railway (later part of the Milwaukee Road. After brief use on the main line, they were used for mixed trains and goods trains on the Anfeng Line between Fengtian and Andong.

Mantetsu found it inconvenient to operate a class consisting of only two locomotives, so in 1918 they were both transferred to the Jichang Railway, which in 1931 merged with the Jidun Railway to form the Jichang Jidun Railway, where they were numbered 200 and 201. In 1933, the Manchukuo National Railway was created through the nationalisation and merger of several privately owned railways, including the Jichang-Jidun Railway, and these locomotives passed to the Manchukuo National Railway, which classified them as the Tehoni (テホニ) class numbered 5621 and 5622, becoming Tehoni 501 and 502 in 1938.

Owner	Class & numbers (pre-1906)	Class & numbers (1907–1918)	Class & numbers (1918–1931)	Class & numbers (1931–1933)	Class & numbers (1933–1938)	Class & numbers (1938–1945)
Mantetsu	100, 101	F600, F601	-	-	-	-
Jichang Ry	-	-	200, 201	-	-	-
Jichang Jidun Ry	-	-	-	200, 201	-	-
Manchukuo National	-	-	-	-	テホニ5621, テホニ5622	テホニ501, テホニ502

== Postwar ==
Both were taken over by the Republic of China Railway after the end of the Pacific War. Following the establishment of the People's Republic and the current China Railway, they were designated class ㄊㄏ十 (TH10) in 1951, becoming class TH10 (written in Pinyin instead of Zhuyin) in 1959. This class retired in 1975.
