= Zhongxing railway station (Fengcheng) =

Railway station in Fengcheng, Liaoning, China

Coordinates: 40.5299°N 124.0480°E

Zhongxing 中兴

General information
- Location: Fengcheng, Liaoning, Dandong, Liaoning; China
- Operator: Shenyang Railway Bureau, China Railway Corporation
- Line: Shenyang–Dandong railway

History
- Opened: 1943
Location

The Zhongxing railway station (Chinese: 中兴站; pinyin: Zhōngxīng Zhàn) is a railway station of Shenyang–Dandong railway. The station is located in Fengcheng, Liaoning, China. The station was built in 1943.

== Notes ==
- The information in this article is based on that in its Chinese equivalent.
