= China Railways MT1 =

China Railways MT1 Mantetsu Matei class (マテイ)
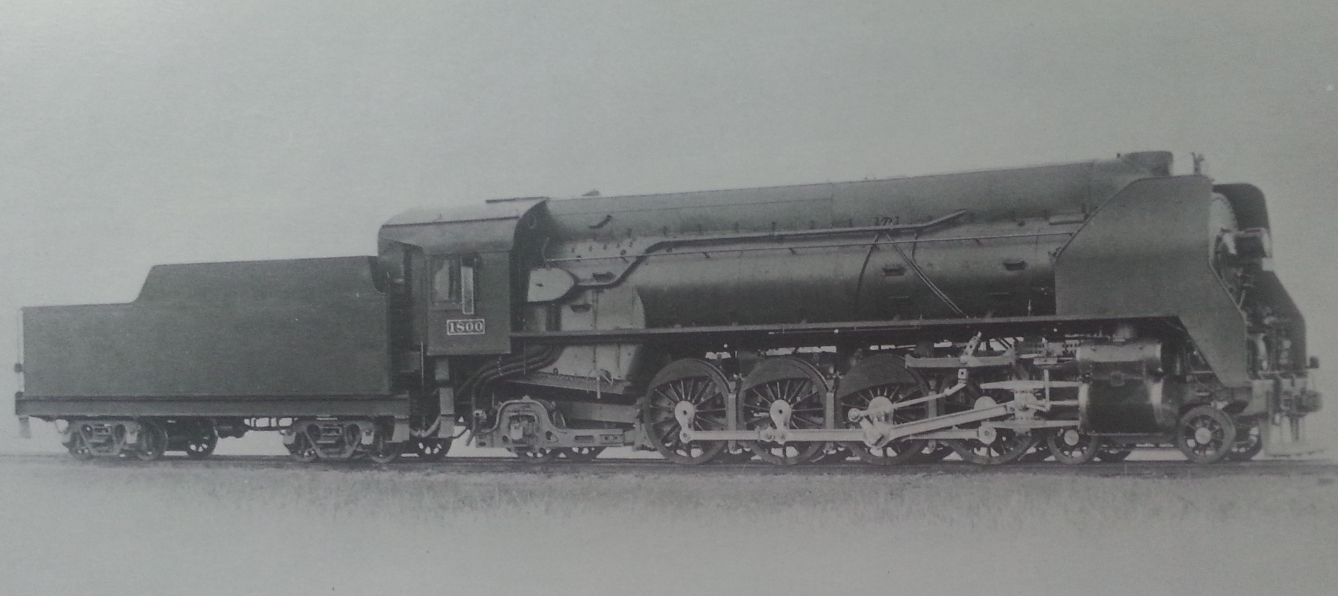
- Builder's photo of マテイ1800.
Type and origin
- Power type: Steam
- Builder: Kawasaki; Hitachi
- Build date: 1936
- Total produced: 7
Specifications
- Configuration
  - Whyte: 4-8-2
- Gauge: 1,435 mm (4 ft 8 1/2 in) standard gauge
- Driver dia.: 1,750 mm (68.9 in)
- Length: 25,981 mm (85 ft 2 7/8 in)
- Width: 3,123 mm (10 ft 3 in)
- Height: 4,740 mm (15 ft 6 5/8 in)
- Adhesive weight: 83.39 t (82.07 long tons; 91.92 short tons)
- Loco weight: 126.28 t (124.29 long tons; 139.20 short tons)
- Tender weight: 85.00 t (83.66 long tons; 93.70 short tons)
- Total weight: 211.28 t (207.94 long tons; 232.90 short tons)
- Fuel type: Coal
- Fuel capacity: 15.00 t (14.76 long tons; 16.53 short tons)
- Water cap.: 35.00 m^{3} (1,236 cu ft)
- Firebox
  - Grate area: 5.36 m^{2} (57.7 sq ft)
- Boiler
  - Small tubes: 93 x 51 mm (2.0 in)
  - Large tubes: 108 x 90 mm (3.5 in)
- Boiler pressure: 14.5 kgf/cm^{2} (206 psi)
- Heating surface
  - Firebox: 28.71 m^{2} (309.0 sq ft)
  - Tubes: 266.77 m^{2} (2,871.5 sq ft)
  - Total surface: 395.66 m^{2} (4,258.8 sq ft)
- Superheater
  - Type: Schmidt type E
  - Heating area: 100.18 m^{2} (1,078.3 sq ft)
- Cylinders: Two, outside
- Cylinder size: 630 mm × 760 mm (24.80 in × 29.92 in)
Performance figures
- Maximum speed: 90 km/h (56 mph)
- Tractive effort: 208.37 kN (46,840 lb_{f})
Career
- Operators: South Manchuria Railway; China Railway
- Class: SMR: マテイ; CR: ㄇㄎ一 (1951–1959); CR: MT1 (1959–end)
- Number in class: 7
- Numbers: SMR: 1800–1806 (1936–1938); SMR: マテイ1–7 (1938–1945); CR: 1–7
- Disposition: All scrapped

The China Railways MT1 class steam locomotive was a class of 4-8-2 "Mountain" type steam locomotives for goods trains operated by the China Railway. They were originally built in Japan for the South Manchuria Railway (Mantetsu) in 1936. The "Mate" name came from the American naming system for steam locomotives, under which locomotives with 4-8-2 wheel arrangement were called "Mountain".

== History ==
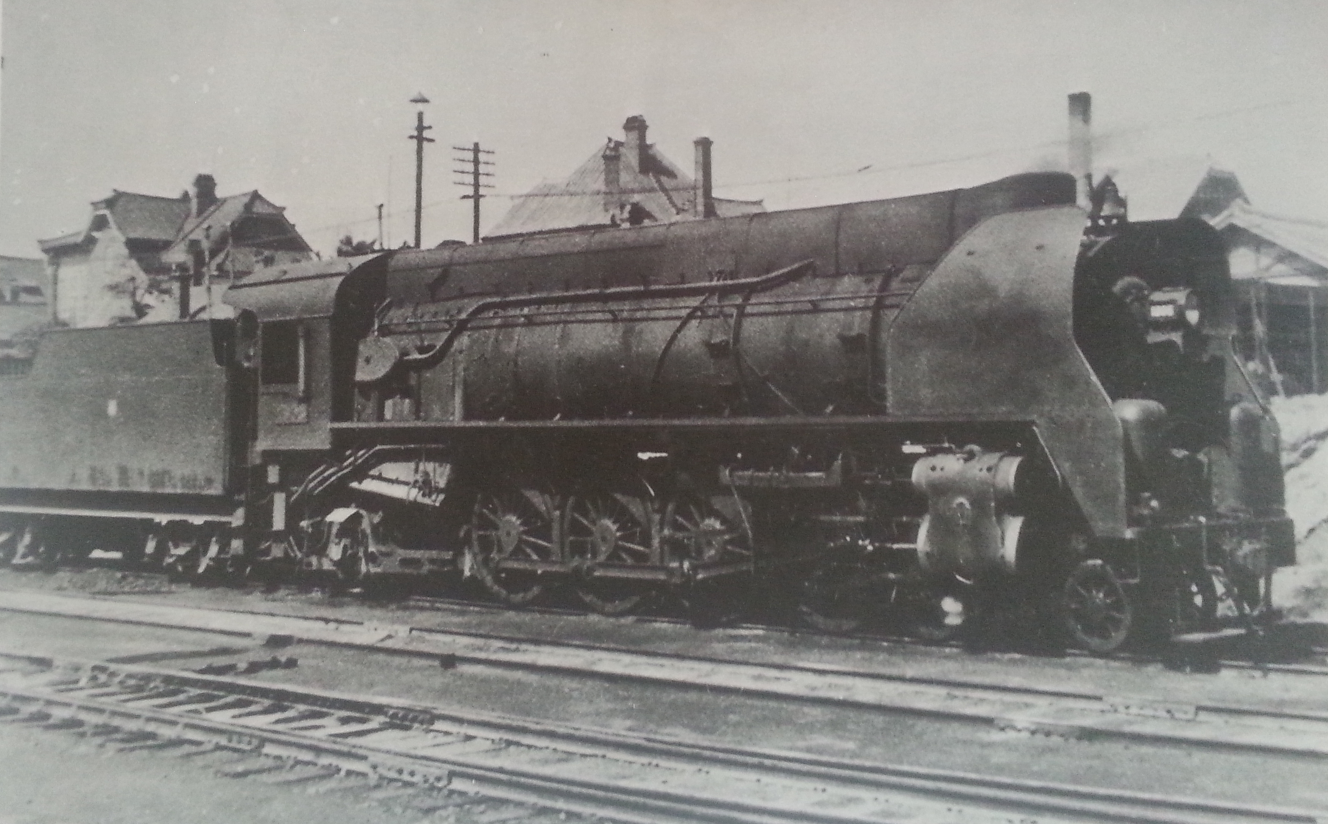
マテイ1805 at Dalian sometime between 1936 and 1938.

As the development of Manchukuo continued and the population of cities like Xinjing and Harbin grew, it became necessary to transport increasing quantities of fresh foods to the north. To fill this need, express fish trains were planned, for which a goods locomotive capable of high speed operation was required. The result of this requirement was the Matei class superheated tender locomotive built in 1936. They were the largest Mantetsu locomotives in terms of length and weight, and were equipped with a Schmidt type E superheater, a feedwater heater, and an automatic stoker. Originally planned with a 4-6-2 wheel arrangement and intended for high-speed transport of perishable foods to the north, but the need to pull regular goods trains southbound led to the use of a 4-8-2 arrangement for traction and larger wheel diameter for increased speed. A total of seven were built by Kawasaki and Hitachi in 1936. They were used mainly on express goods trains between Dalian and Xinjing, and could pull 1,700 t (1,700 long tons; 1,900 short tons) of freight at 90 km/h (56 mph), and they were also occasionally used on southbound passenger trains.

Owner	Class & numbers (1936–1938)	Class & numbers (1938–1945)	Builder	Year
Mantetsu	マテイ1800–マテイ1806	マテイ1–マテイ7	Kawasaki, Hitachi	1936

== Postwar ==
At the end of the Pacific War, all seven were assigned to the Sujiatun locomotive depot of the Fengtian Railway Bureau, and all were taken over by the Republic of China Railway. Following the establishment of the People's Republic and the subsequent creation of the current China Railway, they became class ㄇㄉ一 (MT1) in 1951, becoming class MT1 (written in Pinyin instead of Zhuyin) in 1959, and numbered 1–7. Numbers 5 and 6 were in service at the Hegang mine in 1985. This class retired 1990.

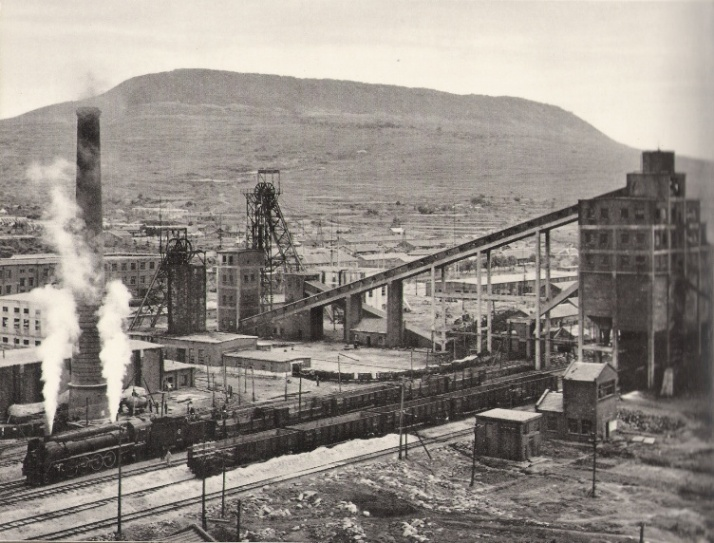
Matei (MT1) at Pingdingshan
