= Shenyang–Dandong railway =

Railway line in Liaoning, China

Shendan Railway
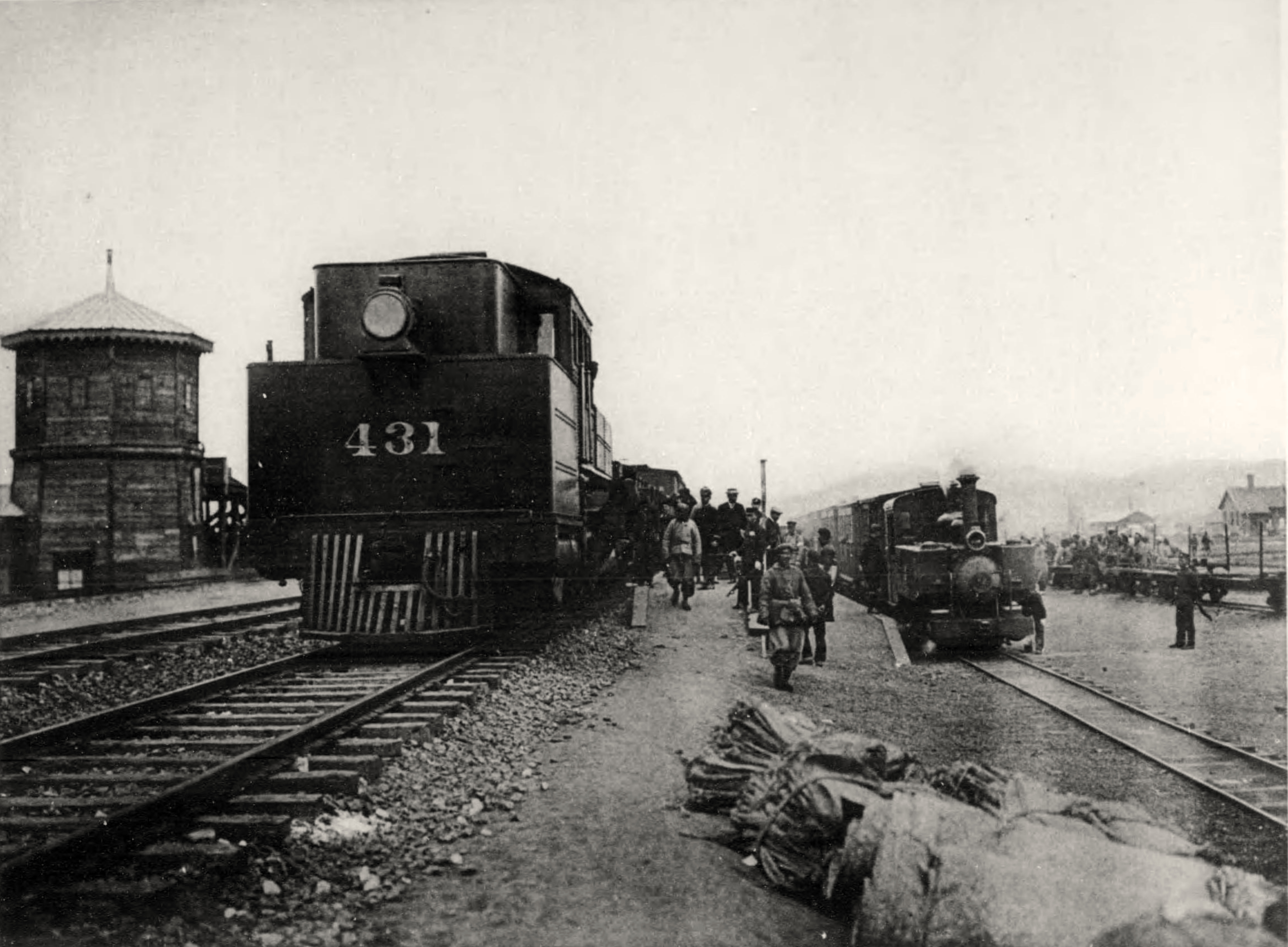
- Standard gauge and narrow gauge trains, 1904-1911

Overview
- Other name(s): Anfeng Line (安奉線; Anpō Line)
- Native name: 沈丹铁路
- Status: Operational
- Owner: Imperial Japanese Army (1905–1906); South Manchuria Railway (1906–1945); China Changchun Railway (1945–1955); China Railway (since 1945)
- Locale: Liaoning Province
- Termini: Shenyang; Dandong
- Stations: 43

Service
- Type: Heavy rail, Regional rail

History
- Opened: 3 December 1905

Technical
- Line length: 270 km (170 mi)
- Track gauge: 1,435 mm (4 ft 8 1/2 in) standard gauge
- Old gauge: 762 mm

The Shenyang–Dandong railway or Shendan Railway (simplified Chinese: 沈丹铁路; traditional Chinese: 沈丹鐵路; pinyin: Shén-Dān Tiělù) is a China Railway line connecting the Liaoning cities of Shenyang and Dandong, with an onward connection to Sinŭiju Ch'ŏngnyŏn Station in Sinŭiju, North Korea, on the P'yŏngŭi Line of the Korean State Railway. The line is 277 km (172 mi) in length and is subordinate to the Shenyang Railway Bureau. It is the most important of the railway lines connecting China with the DPRK.

== History ==
The line from Andong (now Dandong) to Fengtian (now Shenyang) was originally built by the Imperial Japanese Army as a 762 mm (30.0 in) narrow-gauge rail line during the Russo-Japanese War. Later, it was transferred to the South Manchuria Railway (Mantetsu), which named it the Anfeng Line (Anpō Line with the official Japanese name) after the two termini (Fengtian being pronounced Hōten in Japanese); the travel time for passenger trains between Andong and Fengtian was two days. In accordance with the agreement signed between Japan and China after the end of the war, work to convert the line from narrow to standard gauge began in August 1909 and was completed in October 1911. On 1 November 1911, the Yalu River Bridge was completed, connecting the line, and Mantetsu, to the Gyeongui Line of the Chosen Government Railway. The Anpō Line connected to Mantetsu's Renkyō Line at Fengtian. Double tracking of the line was completed in September 1944.

The line was heavily damaged during the Pacific War; after the defeat of Japan, it was, along with all other railway lines in the territory of the former Manchukuo, taken over by the Soviet-controlled China Changchun Railway. In 1955, the Soviets returned control of the railways in Dongbei, and the line became part of the China Railway. Reconstruction of the line as a single-track line was completed in 1953, and it was renamed Shen'an Railway, after Fengtian was renamed Shenyang. After Andong was renamed Dandong in 1965 the line was once again renamed, receiving its current name at that time. At present, the Sujiatun–Benxi–Nanfen and Qijiabao–Caohekou sections of the line are double tracked, but work is underway to double the entire line.

In 2015, a new line was completed between Dandong and Jinshanwan, which allows passenger trains to bypass Hamatang and Shahezhen completely. This also shortens the distance from Shenyang to Dandong by 7 km (4.3 mi).

== Route ==
Main line
Distance		Station name				
Total; km	S2S; km	Current name	Former name	Japanese name (to 1945)	Opened	Connections (present) Connections (pre-1945)
0	0	Shenyang 沈阳/瀋陽	Fengtian/Mukden 奉天	Hōten		Present: Shenda Railway, Jingha Railway, Shenji Railway, Shenfu intercity railway Former: MNR Fengshan Line, MNR Fengji Line, Mantetsu Renkyō Line
8	8	Hunhe 浑河/渾河		Konga		Present: Shenda Railway; Former: Mantetsu Renkyō Line, Mantetsu Kon'yu Connecting Line
13	5	Subei 苏北/蘇北		Sehoku		Present: Shenda Railway; Former: Mantetsu Renkyō Line
16	3	Sujiatun 苏家屯/蘇家屯		Sokaton		Present: Shenda Railway, Shenfu Interurban Railway (closed 2009); Former: Mantetsu Renkyō Line, Mantetsu Bushun Line
26	10	Shenyangzimaoqu 沈阳自贸区/瀋陽自貿區	Wujiatun 吴家屯/吳家屯	Gokaton		
36	10	Chenxiangtun 陈相屯/陳相屯		Chinshōton		
47	11	Yaoqianhutun 姚千户屯		Yōsenkoton		
54	7	Waitoushan 歪头山/歪頭山		Waitōsan		
60	6	Shiqiaozi 石桥子/石橋子		Sekikyōshi		Present: Weining Railway; Former MNR Weining Line
66	6	Gaojiasui 高家岁/高家歲		Kōkasei		
73	7	Huolianzhai 火连寨		Karensai		
79	6	Benxihu 本溪湖/本溪湖		Honkeiko		
84	5	Benxi 本溪		Honkei		Present: Liaoxi Railway, Weining Railway, Xitian Railway; Former: MNR Liaoxi Line, MNR Weining Line MNR Xitian Line
88	4	Fujin 福金		Fukukin		
95	7	Qiaobei 桥北/橋北		Kyōhoku		
97	2	Qiaotou 桥头/橋頭		Kyōtō	1905	
104	7	Jinkeng 金坑		Kinkō	1904	
109	5	Nanfen 南芬		Nanfun	1905	
120	11	Xiamatang 下马塘/下馬塘		Kamatō	1907	
128	8	Liangshanguan 连山关/連山關		Rensenkan	1907	
138	10	Qijiabao 祁家堡		Kikahō	1911	
148	10	Caohekou 草河口		Sōkakō	1907	
160	12	Tongyuanbao 通远堡		Tōenpō	1904	
170	10	Linjiatai 林家台		Rinkatai	1904	
176	6	Liujiahe 刘家河/劉家河		Ryūkaka	1904	Present: Shendan Railway secondary line Past: Anpō Line secondary line
183	7	Qiumuzhuang 秋木庄/秋木莊		Shūbokusō		
197	14	Jiguanshan 鸡冠山/雞冠山		Keikansan	1904	
203	6	Yuanjiabao 袁家堡		Enkahō		
208	5	Sitaizi 四台子		Shitaishi		
213	5	Ertaizi 二台子		n/a	1960	
217	17	Fenghuangcheng 凤凰城/鳳凰城		Hōōjō	1907	Fengshang Railway, Shendan Railway main line Past: MNR Fengshang Line, Anpō Line secondary line
224	7	Zhangjiabao 张家堡/張家堡		Chōkahō	1934	
232	8	Yimianshan 一面山		Ichimensan	1904	
238	6	Tanghe 汤河/湯河		Tōka		
244	6	Tangshancheng 汤山城/湯山城		Tōsanjō	1931	
253	9	Wulongbei 五龙背/五龍背		Goryūhai	1907	
260	7	Laogugou 老古沟/老古溝		Rōkokō	1907	
263	3	Jinshanwan 金山湾/金山灣		Kinsanwan	1934	
267	4	Hamatang 蛤蟆塘		Kōbatō	1907	
274	7	Shahezhen 沙河镇/沙河鎮		Shakachin	1907	
270; ~~277~~	7; ~~14~~	Dandong 丹东/丹東	Andong 安東	Antō	1904	
		Yalu River; Sino–Korean Friendship Bridge	鸭绿江/鴨綠江/압록강 朝中友誼橋/조중우의교			DPRK−PRC border
272.6	2.6	Sinŭiju Ch'ŏngnyŏn 신의주청년 (新義州青年)	Sinŭiju 신의주 (新義州)	Shingishū	1904	Present: Korean State Railway Kang'an Line, KSR P'yŏngŭi Line; Past: Sentetsu Gyeongui Line, Sentetsu Sinuiju Kang'an Line

Secondary line
Distance		Station name				
Total; km	S2S; km	Current name	Former name	Japanese name (to 1945)	Year opened	Connections (present) Connections (pre-1945)
176 from Shenyang	0	Liujiahe 刘家河/劉家河		Ryūkaka	1904	Present: Shendan Railway main line Past: Anpō Line main line
188 from Shenyang	8	Changhong 长虹/長虹		Chōkō	1942	
200 from Shenyang	12	Zhongxing 中兴/中興		Chūkyō	1943	
217 from Shenyang	17	Fenghuangcheng 凤凰城/鳳凰城		Hōōjō	1907	Fengshang Railway, Shendan Railway main line Past: MNR Fengshang Line, Anpō Line main line
