= China Railways JF =

Chinese steam locomotive series

解放 JF
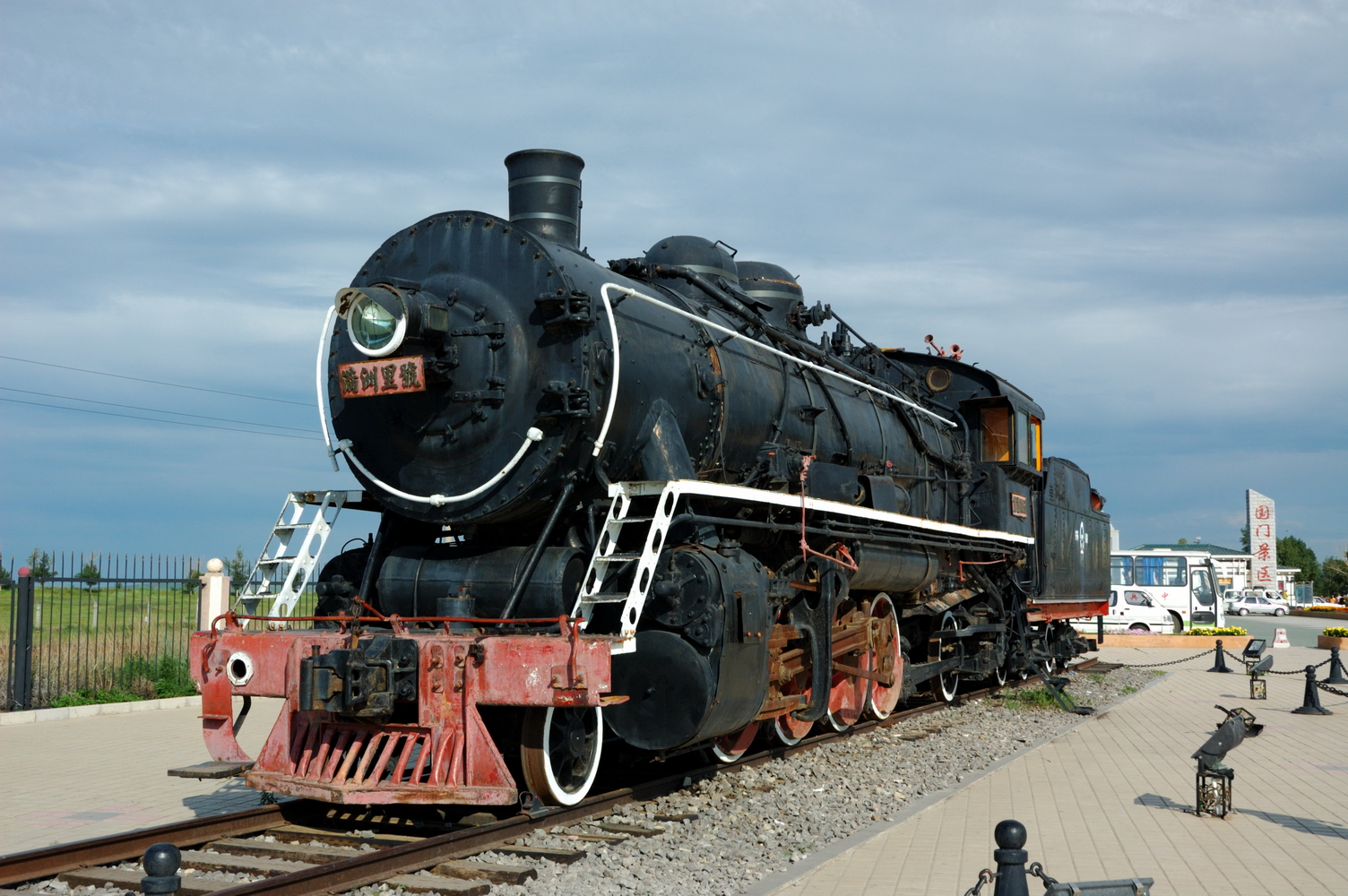
- JF1-1861 - previously North China Transport ミカイ1861.
Type and origin
- Power type: Steam
- Builder: ALCO; Kawasaki; Hitachi; Sifang Works; Dalian Works; Qiqihar Works; Shenyang Works
- Model: JF
- Build date: 1918–1960
- Total produced: 2,000 (1918–45); 455 (1952–60)
Specifications
- Configuration
  - Whyte: 2-8-2
- Gauge: 1,435 mm (4 ft 8 1/2 in)
- Fuel type: Coal
- Cylinders: Two, outside
- Valve gear: Walschaerts
- Valve type: Piston valves
- Loco brake: Air
- Train brakes: Air
- Couplers: Knuckle
Career
- Operators: China Railway
- Number in class: 2,455
- Numbers: 1–70, 71–500, 501–574, 575, 2100, 2101–2120, 2121–2500, 4001–4101
- Delivered: 1918
- First run: 1918
- Last run: March 2007
- Retired: 1996–2007
- Preserved: 13
- Restored: 2006 (No. 886)
- Disposition: 13 preserved (9 in China, 4 in South Korea), remainder scrapped

The China Railways JF (Chinese: 解放; pinyin: Jiěfàng; lit. 'Liberation') class is a name given to a group of classes of steam locomotives for freight trains with 2-8-2 "Mikado" wheel arrangement operated by the China Railway. Originally designated ㄇㄎ壹 (MK1) class by the China Railways in 1951, the present name was assigned to them in 1959.

== Composition ==
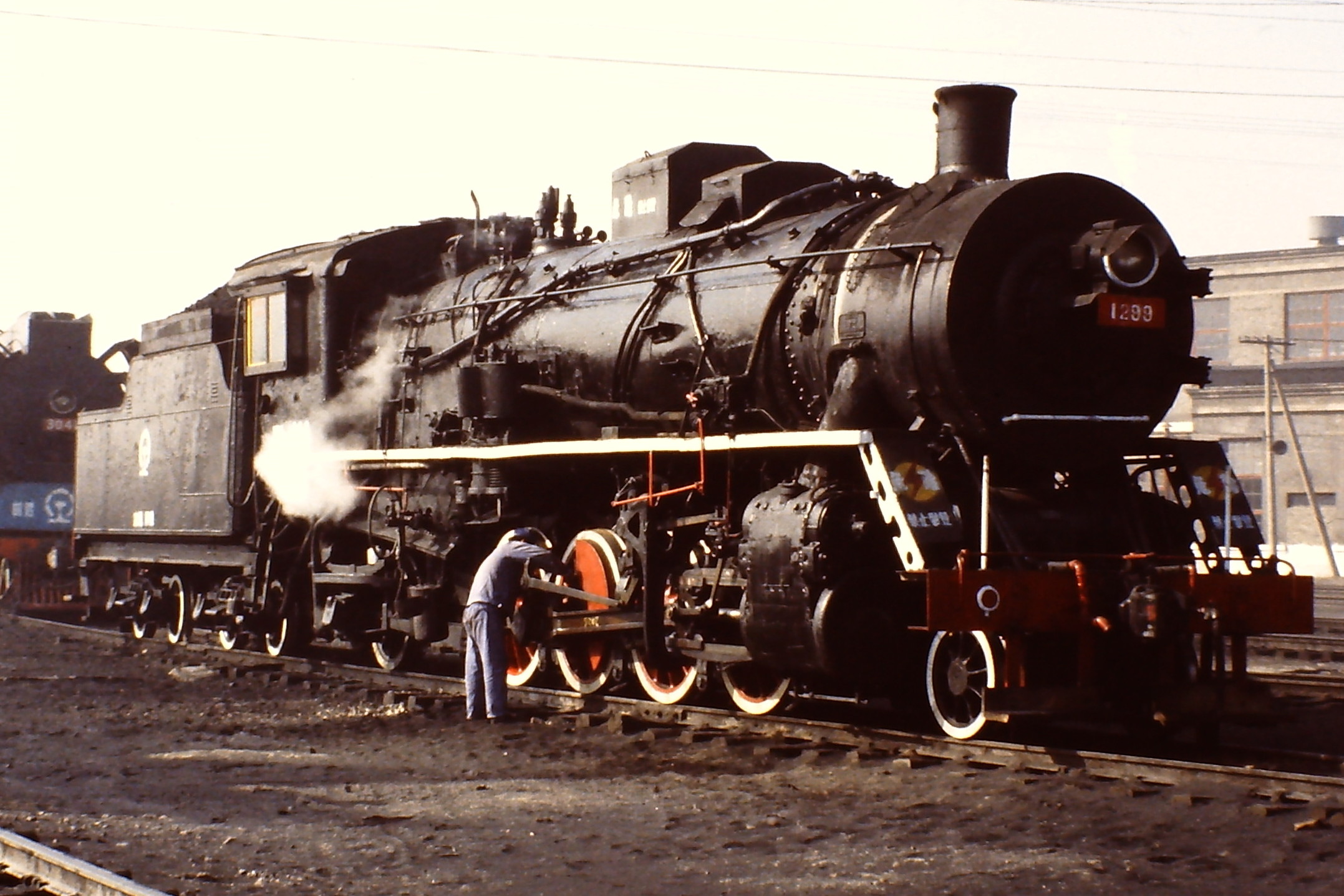
"New National Big Mika" type JF1-1299 (ex Manchukuo National ミカイ1299) at Harbin, 1984

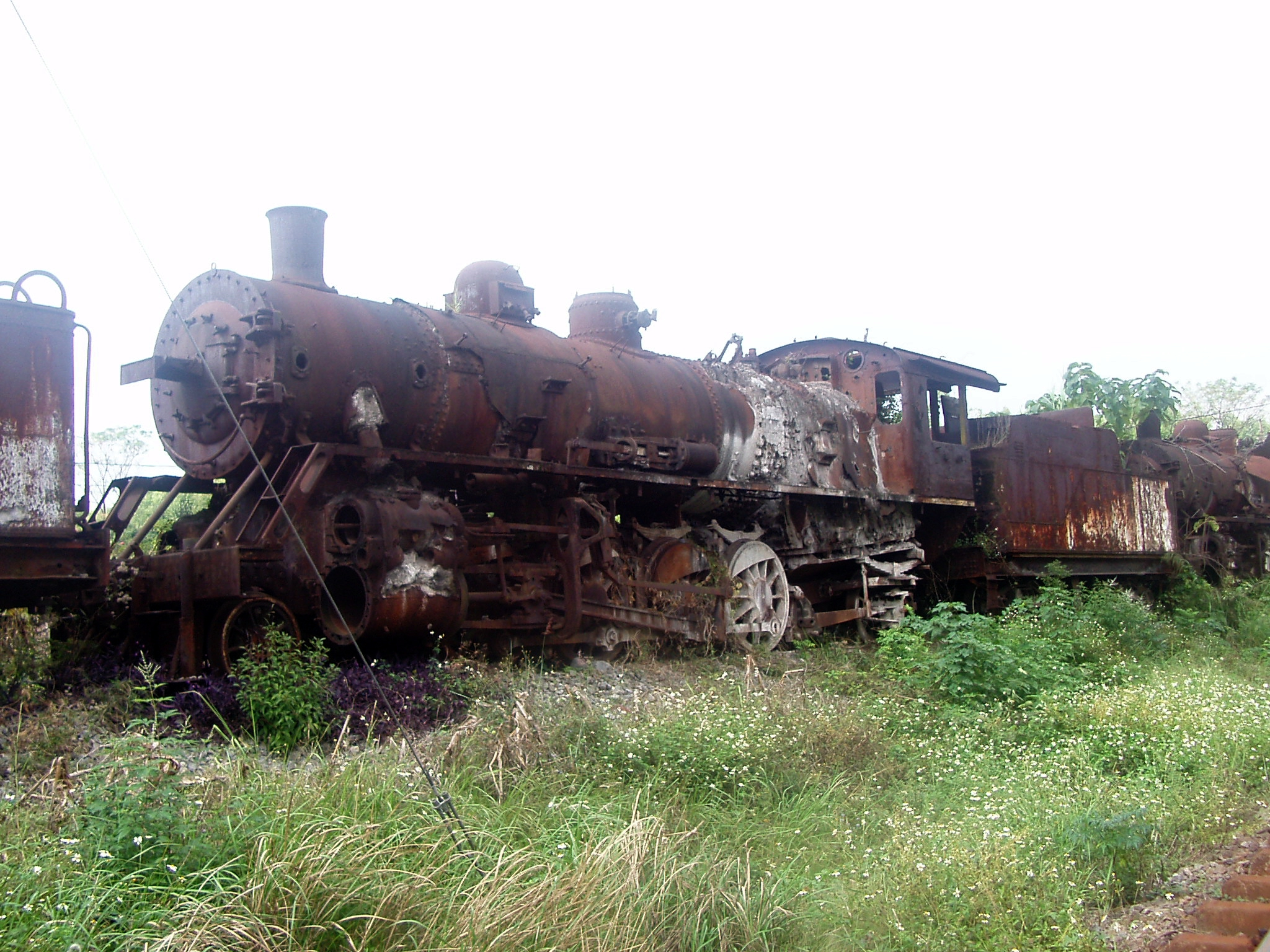
A dumped JF6 Steam Locomotive in Heshan, Laibin, 2014

The JF group of classes is made up of twenty different classes of 2-8-2 steam locomotives:

- JF1 – 2027 engines; 455 built new after 1950, rest inherited from South Manchuria Railway, Manchukuo National Railway, North China Transport, Central China Railway, and private railways;
- JF2 – 41 engines inherited from the South Manchuria Railway;
- JF3 – 150 engines built in Czechoslovakia and inherited from the Manchukuo National Railway;
- JF4 – 15 engines inherited from the South Manchuria Railway;
- JF5 – inherited from North China Transport, originally built for the Jichang Railway
- JF6 – around 475 engines; 5 built new after 1950, rest inherited from the South Manchuria Railway, the Manchukuo National Railway, and North China Transport;
- JF7 – originally built for the Jingfeng Railway, inherited from North China Transport;
- JF8 – originally built for the Huainan Railway, inherited from the Central China Railway;
- JF9 – 38 engines of the Sentetsu Mikasa class, inherited from the Central China Railway;
- JF10 – 30 engines, US Army Transportation Corps S200 class, given to China as postwar reconstruction aid from the UNRRA;
- JF11 – 70 engines inherited from the Central China Railway, originally built for the Jinpu Railway and the Zhegan Railway;
- JF12 – 46 engines inherited from North China Transport, originally built for the Jingsui Railway as Class 300;
- JF13 – inherited from North China Transport, built in Czechoslovakia in 1939;
- JF15 – 6 engines inherited from the Manchukuo National Railway, originally built for the Jihai Railway;
- JF16 – 18 engines inherited from Central China Railway and the Manchukuo National Railway;
- JF17 – inherited from North China Transport, originally built for the Jiaoji Railway;
- JF18 – around 14 engines inherited from South Manchuria Railway;
- JF21 – inherited from the Central China Railway, originally built for the Yuehan Railway.
- JF51 – inherited from the Kunming–Haiphong railway.

The locomotives were used across the Chinese railway system, and were in service on the national railway system until 1996 when the railway began retiring the units; on industrial rail networks some locomotives remained in use until the last JF locomotive, No. 2368, was last used in mainline service in March 2005. The last JF locomotive, No. 2446, was last reported in use was in March 2007. No. 886, was restored to operating condition in 2006 at the Beipiao Mining Railway, and was last reported in storage in working order. Several of the class have been preserved.

== Preservation ==
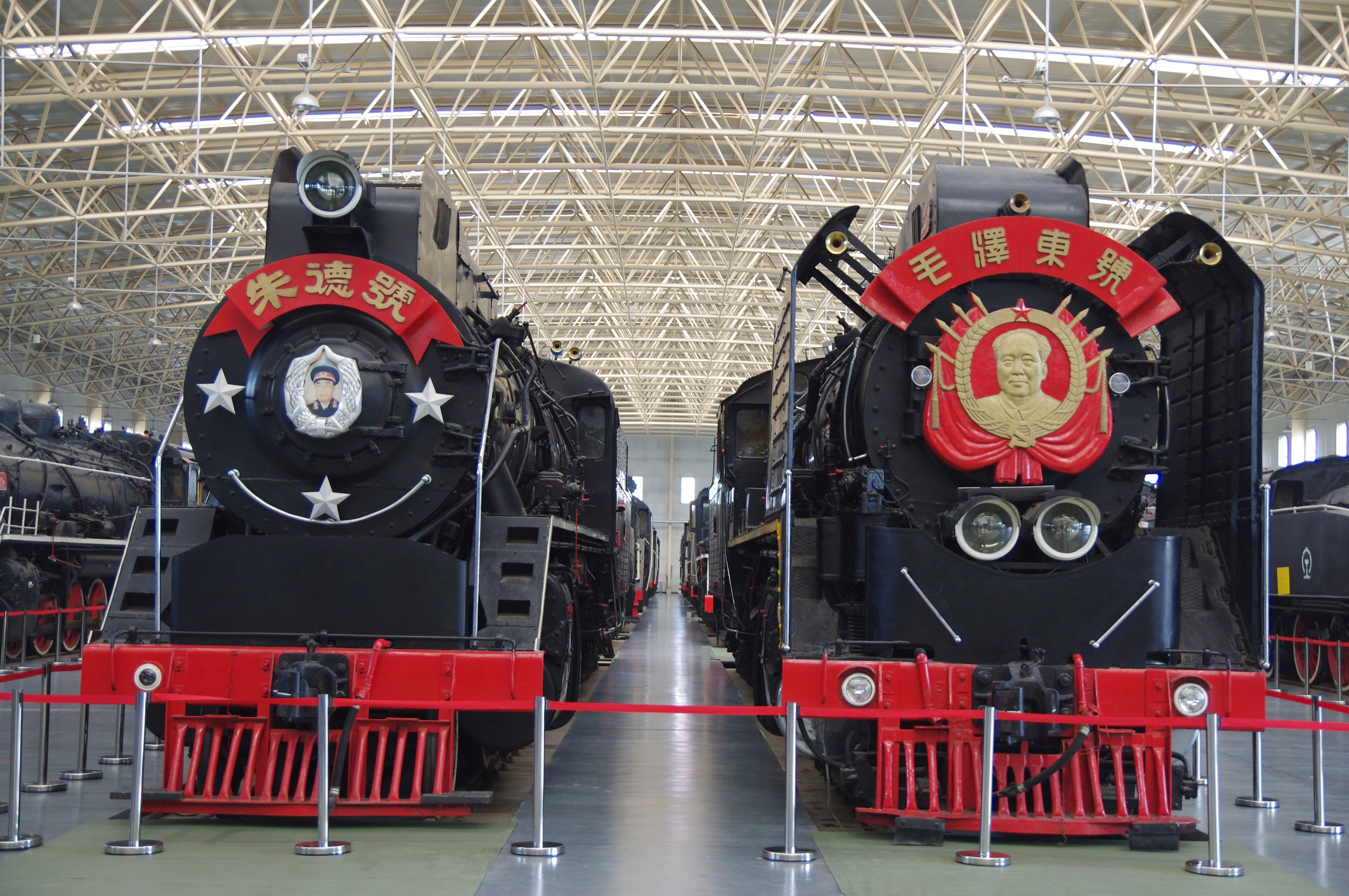
JF1-1191 and JF1-304 at the China Railway Museum

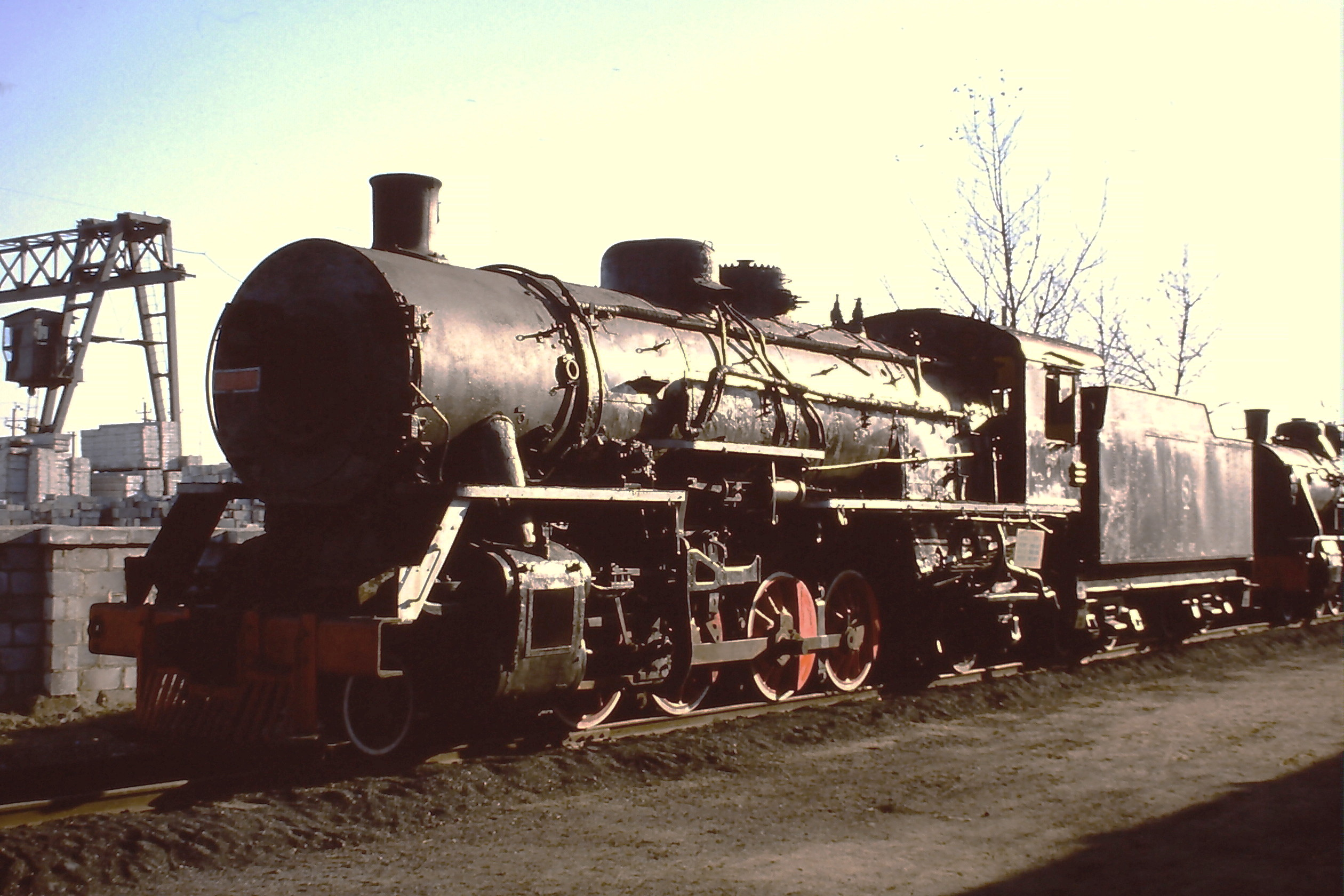
JF2-2525 at Shenyang Railway Museum

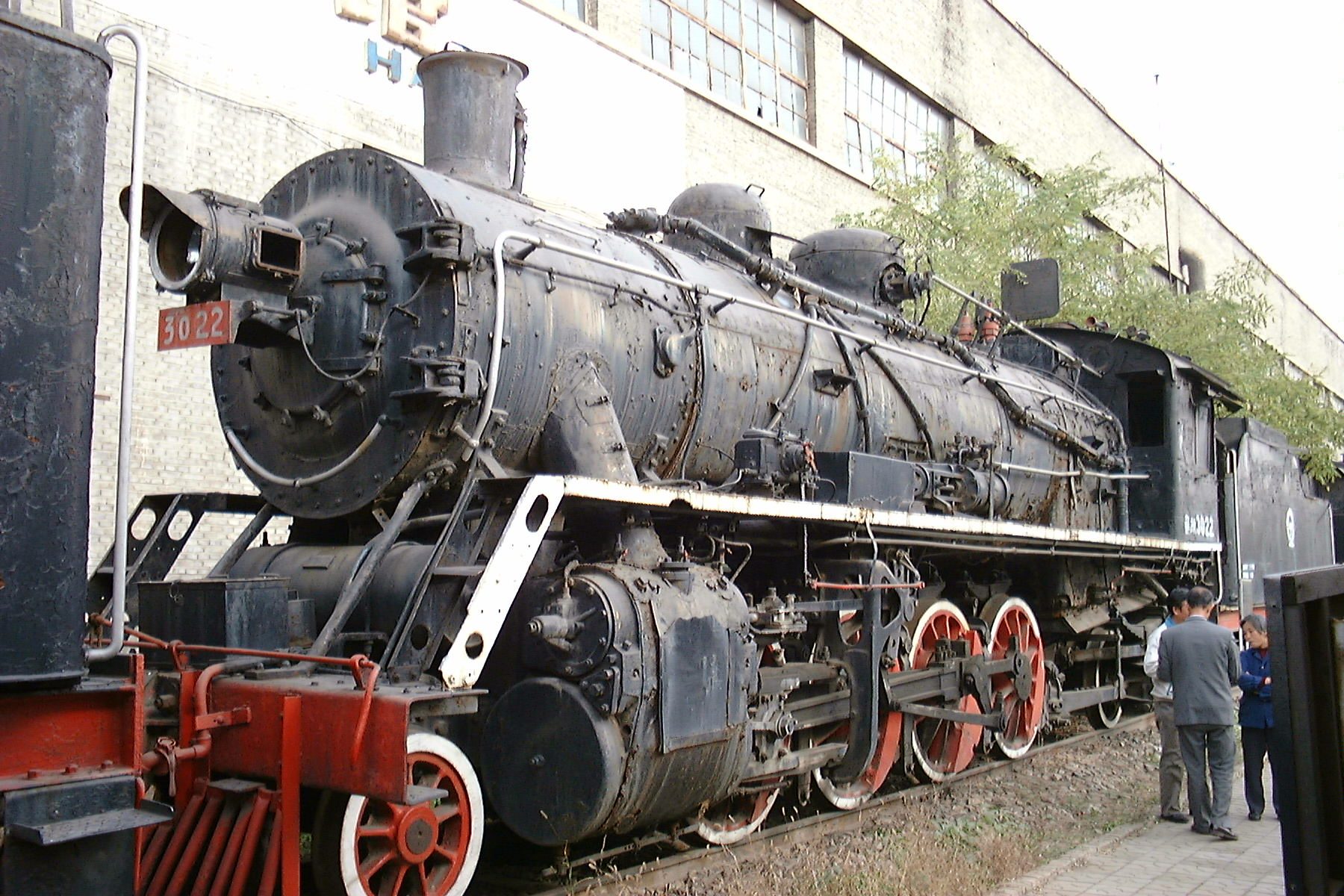
JF6-3022 at former Datong Railway Museum, 1999

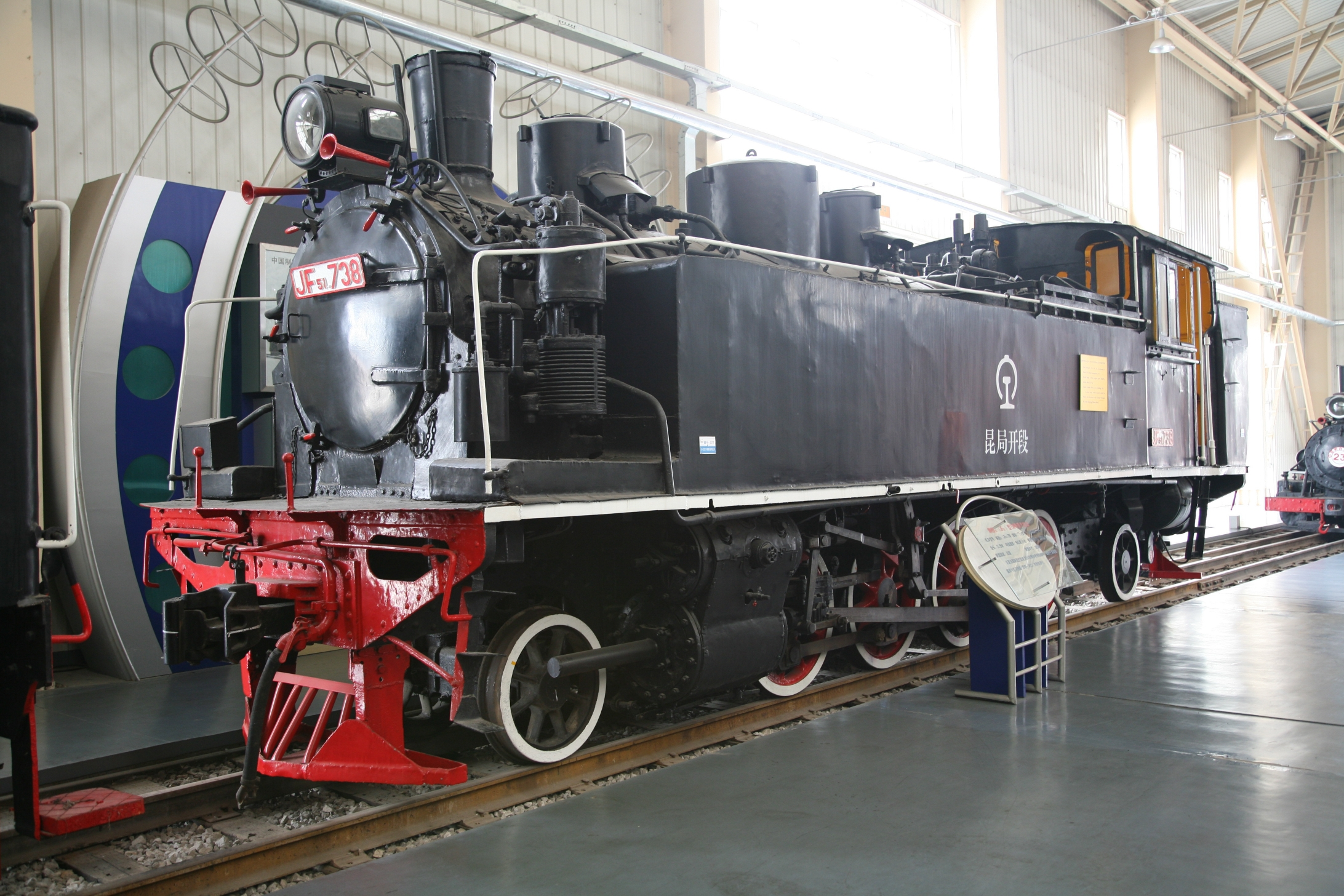
JF51-738 at China Railway Museum

=== JF_{1} ===
- JF_{1}-194: is preserved at Lanzhou Jiaotong University
- JF_{1}-304, JF_{1}-1191, JF_{1}-2101, JF_{1}-2121, JF_{1}-4101: are preserved at the China Railway Museum.
- JF_{1}-522: is preserved at Zhan Tianyou Park, Harbin.
- JF_{1}-747: is preserved at Huainan Servicing Workshop, Hefei Locomotive Depot, Shanghai Railway Bureau.
- JF_{1}-886: is preserved at Hengdaohezi Locomotive Depot, Mudanjiang.
- ㄇㄎ1-1115: is preserved at Dandong Korean War Memorial Hall.
- JF_{1}-1861: is preserved at Manzhouli.
- JF_{1}-2023: is preserved at Linglong Park, Beijing
- JF_{1}-2102: is preserved at CSR Sifang Co Ltd.

=== JF_{2} ===
- JF_{2}-2525: is preserved at Shenyang Railway Museum.

=== JF_{3} ===
- JF_{3}-2558: is preserved at Shenyang Railway Museum.

=== JF_{6} ===
- JF_{6}-3022: is preserved at the China Railway Museum.
- JF_{6}-3329: is preserved at Shenyang Railway Museum.

=== JF_{9} ===
- JF_{9}-3673: is preserved at the China Railway Museum.

=== JF_{11} ===
- JF_{11}-3773: is preserved at the China Railway Museum.
- JF_{11}-3787: is preserved at the China Railway Museum.

=== JF_{51} ===
- JF_{51}-738: is preserved at the China Railway Museum.
