= China Railways ST2 =

China Railways ST2 North China Transport Satani class (サタニ)
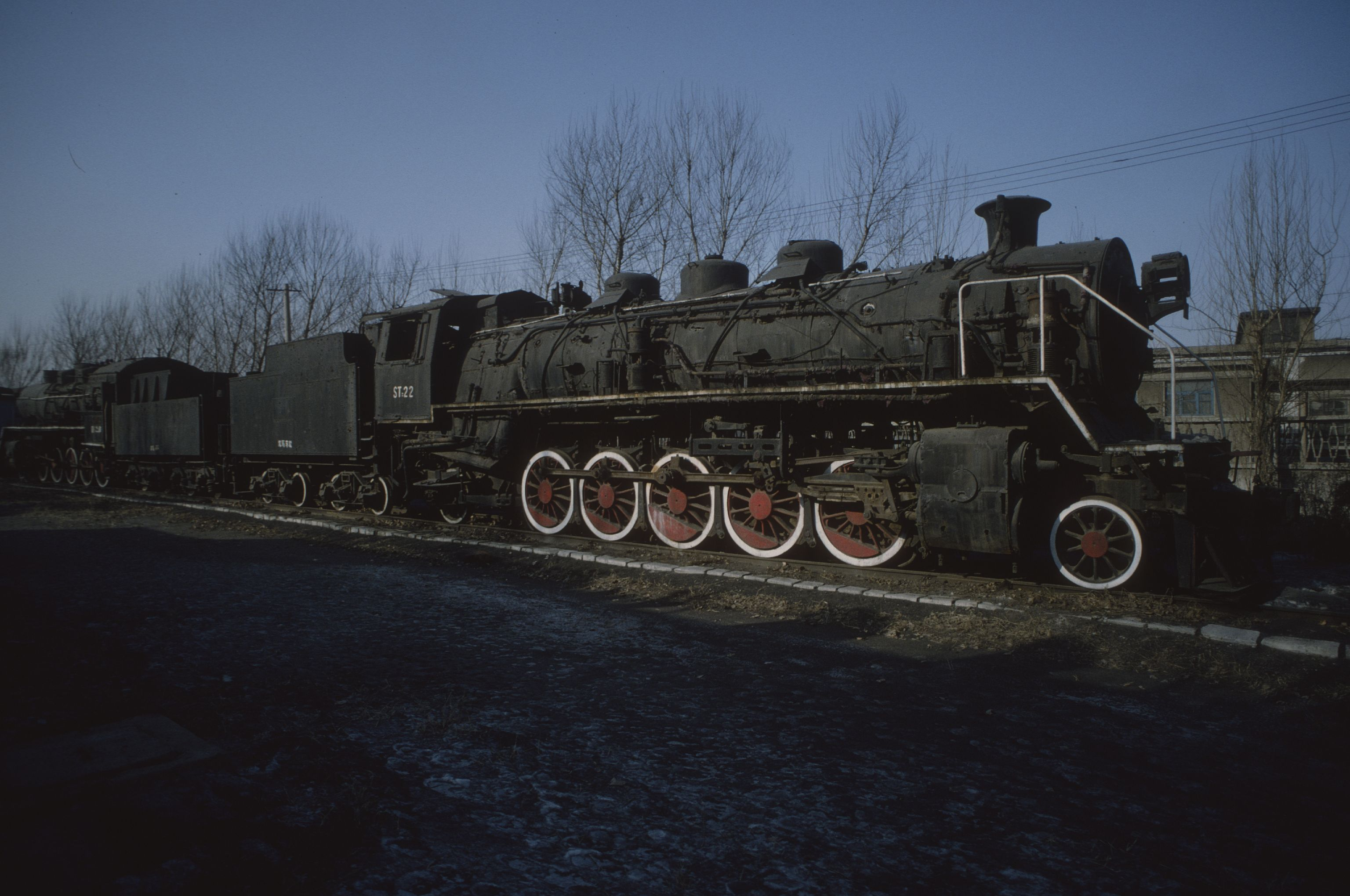
- ST2-22 at the Shenyang Railway Museum
Type and origin
- Power type: Steam
- Builder: Krupp
- Build date: 1935
- Total produced: 10
Specifications
- Configuration
  - Whyte: 2-10-2
- Gauge: 1,435 mm (4 ft 8 1/2 in)
- Fuel type: Coal
- Cylinders: Two, outside
Career
- Operators: Jinpu Railway; North China Transport; China Railway
- Class: NCTC: サタニ (1938-1945); CR: ST2 (1949–end)
- Numbers: NCTC: サタニ1 – サタニ10

The China Railways ST2 class steam locomotive was a class of 2-10-2 "Santa Fe" type steam locomotives operated by the China Railway, built by the Krupp in Germany in 1935 for the privately owned Jinpu Railway in China. After 1938 they were operated by the North China Transportation Company, which designated them サタニ (Satani) class; after 1949 they were operated by the China Railway as class ST2, with the last of them retired by 1990. ST2-22 remains preserved at the Shenyang Railway Museum.

== See also ==
- DRG Class 45
