= China Railways JF11 =

China Railways JF11 (解放11) Jinpu Railway MK class North China Transport Mikana class (ミカナ)
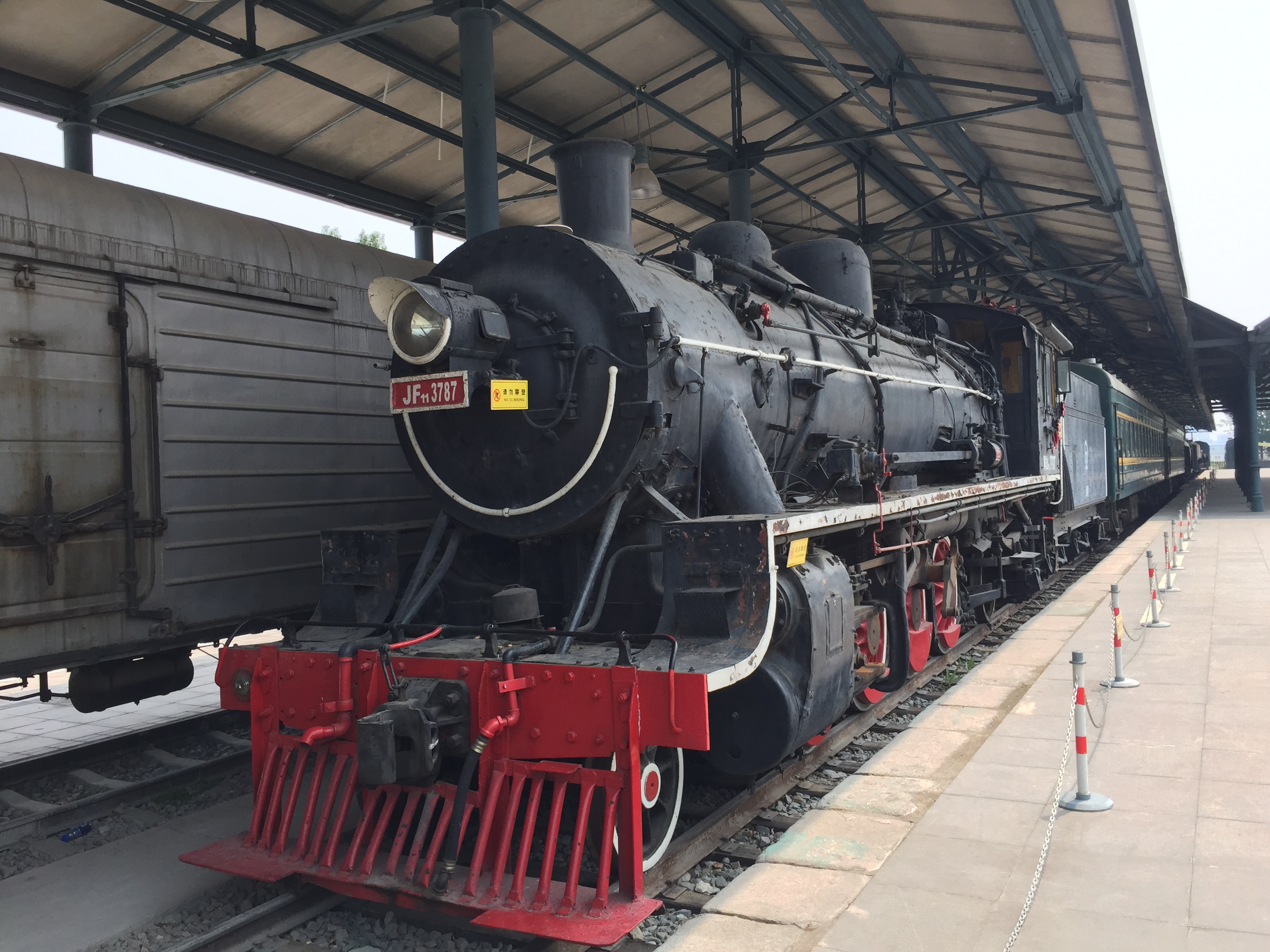
- JF11-3787 at Beijing Railway Museum.
Type and origin
- Power type: Steam
- Builder: ALCo, Baldwin
- Build date: 1918–1937
- Total produced: 70
Specifications
- Configuration
  - Whyte: 2-8-2
- Gauge: 1,435 mm (4 ft 8 1/2 in)
- Driver dia.: 1,372 mm (54.0 in)
- Length: 20,508 mm (67 ft 3.4 in)
- Total weight: 144.78 t (142.49 long tons)
- Fuel type: Coal
- Cylinders: Two, outside
Career
- Operators: Jinpu Railway; Zhegan Railway; North China Transport; Central China Railway; China Railway
- Class: Jinpu: MK; NCTC: シカナ (Mikana); CR: ㄇㄋ11 (1951−1959); CR: 解放11 (1959–end)
- Number in class: Jinpu: 50; Zhegan: 20; NCTC: 50; CCR: 20; CR: 70
- Numbers: NCTC: ミカナ158x CR: 3741–3810
- Preserved: CR 3773 and 3787
- Disposition: 2,preserved, remainder scrapped

The China Railways JF11 (解放11, Jiěfàng, "liberation") class steam locomotive was a class of 2-8-2 "Mikado" type steam locomotives operated by the China Railway.

== History ==
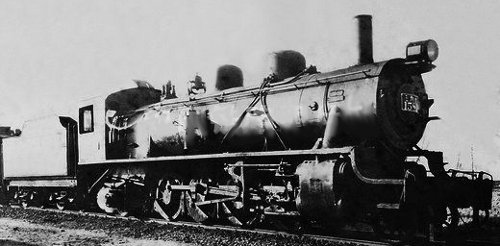
ミカナ158x of North China Transport, one of the Jinpu Railway MK class locomotives.

Originally built for the Jinpu Railway and the Zhegan Railway by ALCO and the Baldwin Locomotive Works in the United States in 1918–1937. The Jinpu Railway designated these MK class, received two deliveries, with the first 30 arriving from ALCo between 1918 and 1920. From 1938 to 1945 they were operated by the North China Transportation Company, which grouped them in the Mikana (ミカナ) class. Those that were delivered to the Zhegan Railway were operated by the Central China Railway during the Japanese occupation.

CR Designation	NCTC Designation	CCR Designation	Original owner	Original class & numbers	Builder	Total in class	Year built	Notes
JF11 3741−3770	ミカナ158x	--	Jinpu Railway	MK xxx	ALCo	30	1918−1920	
JF11 3771−3790	--	?	Zhegan Railway	?	Baldwin; ALCO	20	1937	
JF11 3791−3810	ミカナ158x	--	Jinpu Railway	MK xxx	ALCo?	20	?	

== Postwar ==
They were taken over by China Railways after the end of the Pacific War. China Railways designated them class ㄇㄋ11 (MK11) in 1951, and reclassified them class 解放11 (JF11) in 1959. JF11 3741, 3756, 3767, 3771−3774, 3776, 3777, 3780, 3791, and 3809 are known to have been operated by Liuzhou Railway Bureau after 1959, and the last of the class was retired in 1990.

== Preservation ==
JF11-3773 and JF11-3787 are preserved at Beijing Railway Museum.
