= China Railways AM2 =

China Railways AM2 Peking−Mukden Railway Class 40 North China Transport Ameni class (アメニ)
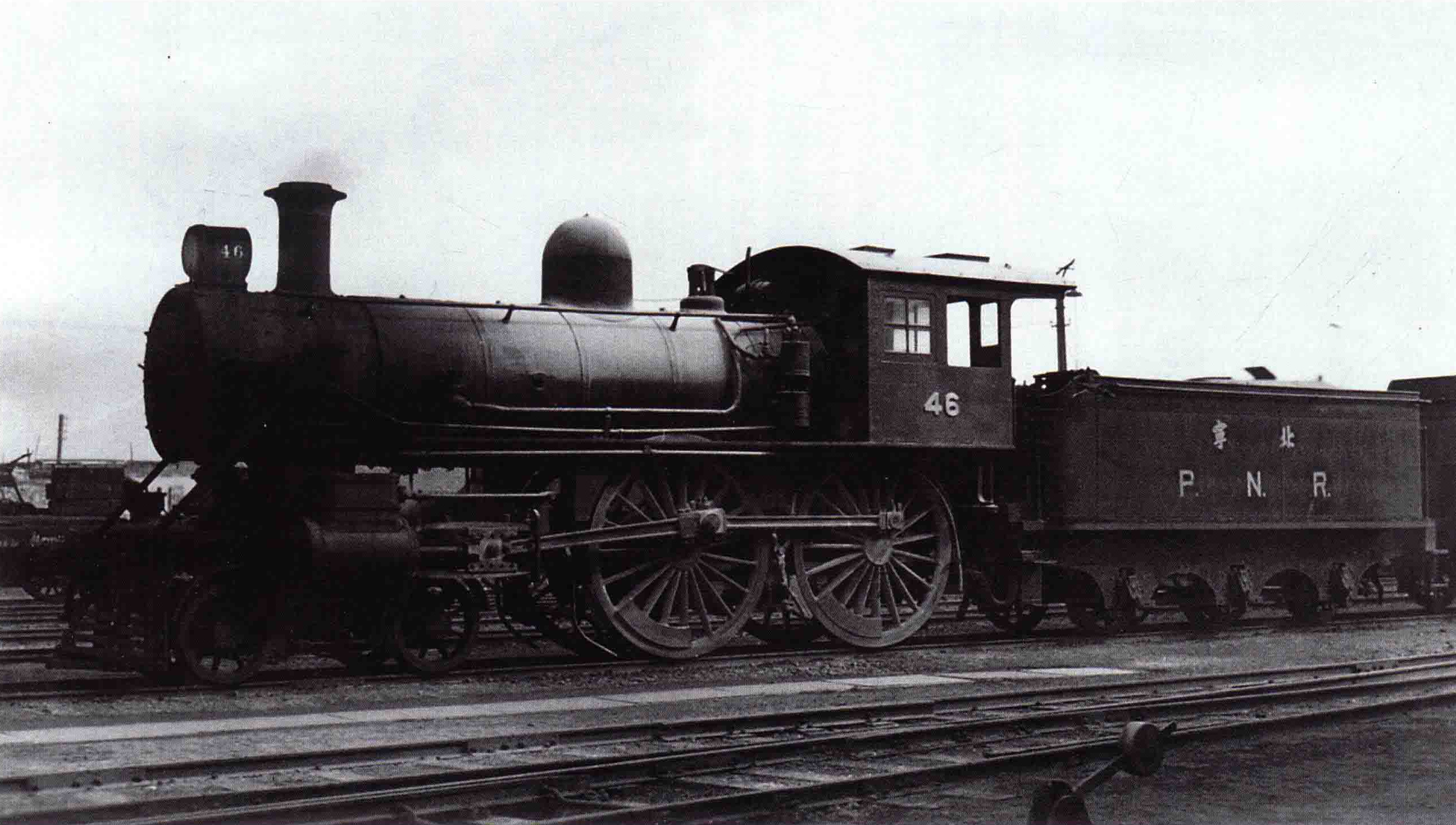
- Peking−Mukden Railway No. 46
Type and origin
- Power type: Steam
- Builder: Baldwin
- Build date: 1897
- Total produced: 6
Specifications
- Configuration
  - Whyte: 4-4-0
- Gauge: 1,435 mm (4 ft 8 1/2 in)
- Length: 17,800 mm (58 ft 5 in)
- Total weight: 92.8 t (91.3 long tons)
- Fuel type: Coal
- Cylinders: Two, outside
Career
- Operators: Peking−Mukden Railway; North China Transport; China Railway
- Class: PMR: 40 series; NCTC: アメニ (1939−1945); CR: ㄚㄇ2 (1951−1959); CR: AM2 (1959–end)
- Number in class: 6
- Numbers: PMR: 41−46; NCTC: アメニ1501−アメニ1506~
- Disposition: All scrapped

The China Railways AM2 class steam locomotive was a class of 4-4-0 "Eight-Wheeler" type steam locomotives operated by China Railways. The engines were built by the Baldwin Locomotive Works in the United States in 1897.

These locomotives were originally built for the Imperial Railroad of North China, which later became known as the Peking−Mukden Railway, and subsequently the Beining Railway; at the time of their introduction, they counted amongst the most modern locomotives of the time. After the Japanese occupation of northern China, the collaborationist Provisional Government of the Republic of China nationalised all railways in its jurisdiction, creating the North China Transportation Company in 1938 to operate the railways in the region. The NCTC designated these locomotives Ameni (アメニ) class.

After the end of the Pacific War, these locomotives were passed on to the Republic of China Railway. After the establishment of the People's Republic of China, China Railways designated them ㄚㄇ2 (AM2) class in 1951, and subsequently AM2 class, in Latin letters instead of Zhuyin script, in 1959. This class retired at 1975.
