= North China Transportation Company =

Former railway company in northern China

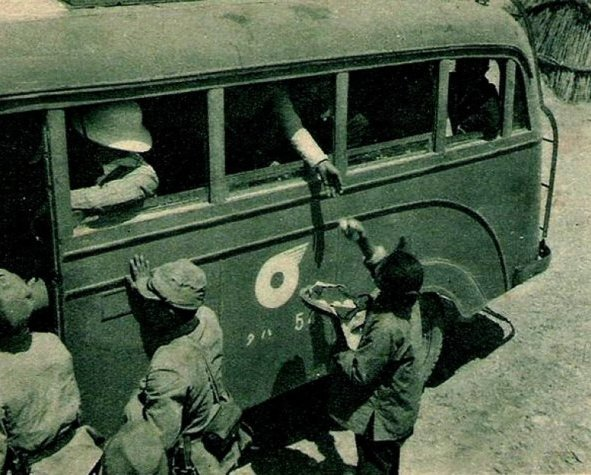
- A bus of the North China Transportation Company (TaHa(タハ)54, Dodge-built bus)
- Native name: 華北交通株式会社
- Romanized name: Japanese Hepburn: Kahoku Kōtsū kabushiki gaisha Chinese pinyin: Huáběi Jiāotōng Zhūshì Huìshè
- Company type: Private KK
- Industry: Railway, Transportation
- Founded: 1938
- Defunct: 1945
- Headquarters: Beijing, Provisional Republic of China
- Area served: east-central China
- Services: Railway transport, Bus transport
- Total equity: 50 million yen
- Number of employees: 110,000
- Parent: South Manchuria Railway

The North China Transportation Company (華北交通株式会社, Japanese: Kahoku Kōtsū kabushiki gaisha, Chinese: Huáběi Jiāotōng Zhūshì Huìshè) was a transportation company in the territory of the collaborationist Provisional Government of the Republic of China during the Japanese occupation.

== History ==
After Japan occupied a large part of northern China during the Sino-Japanese War, it set up a puppet government known as the Provisional Government of the Republic of China. In 1938, the Provisional Government nationalised the various railway and bus companies in its jurisdiction, after which the South Manchuria Railway set up a subsidiary, called the North China Transportation Company, to operate the railways and bus services within the Provisional Government's territory. With its headquarters in Beijing, the NCTC at its peak employed 110,000 people, of which 70% were Chinese. The company was liquidated in 1945 following Japan's defeat in the Pacific War, and the railways were taken over by the China Railway.

Amongst the railway companies that were nationalised were:

- Beining Railway – previously known as the Peking−Mukden Railway; Beijing−Shanhaiguan section only; the Shanhaiguan−Fengtian section was taken over by the Manchukuo National Railway in 1933;
- Jiaoji Railway;
- Jinghan Railway;
- Jingsui Railway – Beijing−Guisui (Hohhot), now part of the Beijing–Baotou Railway;
- Longhai Railway;
- Tongpu Railway – originally narrow gauge, but soon converted to standard gauge;
- Zhengtai Railway – originally narrow gauge, later converted to standard gauge, becoming the Shitai Line.

== Routes ==
- Boshan Line (博山線) Zhangdian-Boshan (張店～博山)
  - Hongshan Line (黌山線) Zichuan-Hongshan (淄川～黌山)
- Jiaoji Trunk Line (膠済幹線) Qingdao-Jinan (青島～済南)
- Jingbao Trunk Line (京包幹線) Beijing-Baotou (北京～包頭)[1]
- Jinggu Trunk Line (京古幹線) Beijing-Gubeikou(北京～古北口)
- Jinghan Trunk Line (京漢幹線) Beijing-Hankou (北京～漢口)
- Jingshan Line (京山線) Beijing-Shanhaiguan (北京～山海関)
- Jinpu Trunk Line (津浦幹線) Tianjin-Xuzhou (天津～徐州)
- Longhai Trunk Line (隴海幹線) Lianyun-Kaifeng (連雲～開封)
- Shimen Trunk Line (石門幹線) Shimen-Dexian (石門～徳縣)
- Shitai Trunk Line (石太幹線) Shimen-Taiyuan (石門～太原)
- Tongpu Trunk Line (同蒲幹線) Datong-Puzhou (大同～蒲州)

== Rolling stock ==
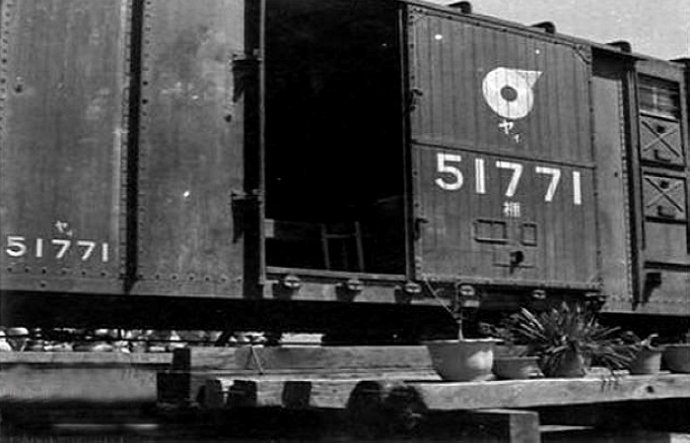
A Ya1 class boxcar of the North China Transportation Company

Locomotives of the North China Transportation Company used the same classification system used by the South Manchuria Railway between 1938 and 1945.

=== Locomotives ===
==== Standard gauge ====
Class	Numbers	Original owner	Original class & numbers	Wheel arr.	Builder	Total in class	Year built	Image	Notes
アメニ; Ameni	1501–1506~	Beining Railway	Class 40: 41–46~	4-4-0	Baldwin	>6	1879		
ダブサ; Dabusa	1501–1504	Jingsui Railway	?	2-6-4T	Baldwin	4	1906		
ダブシ; Dabushi	1501–1504~	Jingsui Railway	Class 20: 21–24~	2-6-4ST	Dübs and Company	>4	1892		
デカサ; Dekasa	1501–1507	Longhai Railway	Class 600: 601–607	2-10-0	Shahekou, Kisha Seizō	7	1937		
エトサ; Etosa	1501−	Jiaoji Railway	?	0-8-0	Japan				
エトシ; Etoshi	1501−	Jiaoji Railway		0-8-0	Henschel	?	1905		
ホネイ; Honei	1501–1508~	Jiaoji Railway	Class 10: 11–18~	0-6-2T	Borsig	>8	1900		Forney locomotive.
ホネニ; Honeni	1501–1507~	Beining Railway	Class 47: 47–53~	0-6-2T	Baldwin	>7	1897		Forney locomotive.
マレイ; Marei	1501–1504	Jingsui Railway	Class 20: 21–24	0-6-6-0	North British	4	1908		
マレニ; Mareni	1501–1504	Jingsui Railway	Class 70: 71–74	2-4-4-2	Baldwin	4	1911		
マレサ; Maresa	1501–1507	Jingsui Railway	Class 90: 91–97	2-8-8-2	ALCo	7	1914		Superheated.
マレシ; Mareshi	1501–1507	Jingsui Railway	Class 200: 201–207	2-8-8-2	ALCo	7	1921		Largest steam locomotives exported from the United States; used on Badaling slope.
ミカイ; Mikai	1501–1520	Manchukuo National	ミカナ16718−16736, 16739	2-8-2	Kisha Seizō, Nippon Sharyō, Hitachi, Kawasaki, Sifang	270	1938		"New National Big Mika" (新國大ミカ). First 20 transferred from Manchukuo National Railway.
ミカイ; Mikai	1521−1769	new for NCTC	--	2-8-2	Kisha Seizō, Nippon Sharyō, Hitachi, Kawasaki, Sifang	270	1939−1945		"New National Big Mika" (新國大ミカ). New for NCTC.
ミカロ; Mikaro	1501−1505	Manchukuo National	ミカロ640–644	2-8-2	Kisha Seizō, others	120	1938–1944		First five transferred from Manchukuo National in 1938.
ミカロ; Mikaro	1506–1620	new for NCTC	–	2-8-2	Kisha Seizō, others	120	1938–1944		72 of the 115 new for NCTC were built by Kisha Seizō in 1938–1939 and 1943–1944.
ミカナ; Mikana	1501–1524	Jingfeng Railway	201–224	2-8-2	North British, Tangshan Arsenal	21+	1913–1924		Built by North British, assembled by Tangshan.
ミカナ; Mikana	1541–1590	Jinpu Railway	MK xxx	2-8-2	ALCo	50	1918–1920, 19xx		
ミカナ; Mikana	1601–1646	Jingsui Railway	Class 300: 301–346	2-8-2	ALCo	46	1922		
ミカナ; Mikana	1651–1654~	Jiaoji Railway	Class 600: 601–604	2-8-2	Hudswell Clarke, Shahekou	>4	1931		
ミカハ; Mikaha	1501–1545	new for NCTC	–	2-8-2	Škoda	45	1939		
モガイ; Mogai	1501–1508	Beining Railway	Class 140: 141–148	2-8-2	North British/Tangshan	8	1903–1908		
モガイ; Mogai	1511–1532	Beining Railway	Class 150: 151–172	2-8-2	North British/Tangshan	22	1914–1916		
モガニ; Mogani	1501–1512	Beining Railway	Class 60: 61–72	2-6-0	Baldwin	12	1897–1899		
モガニ; Mogani	1521–1526	Jinghan Railway	?	2-6-0	Rogers	6	1900–1903		
モガサ; Mogasa	1501–1533	Beining Railway	Class 90: 91–123	2-6-0	Dübs/North British/Tangshan	33	1900–1903		
モガシ; Mogashi	1501–1510	Jingsui Railway	Class 10: 10–19	2-8-2	North British/Tangshan	10	1908–1909		Built by North British, assembled by Tangshan.
モガシ; Mogashi	1511–1538	Jinpu Railway	?	2-8-2	Baldwin	28	1909		
モガシ; Mogashi	1541–1552	Jinpu Railway	?	2-8-2	North British/Tangshan	12	1910		
モガシ; Mogashi	1561–1564	Beining Railway	?	2-8-2	North British/Tangshan	4	1919–1920		
モガシ; Mogashi	1571–1581	Beining Railway	Class 230: 231–241	2-8-2	North British/Tangshan	11	1923–1928		
モガコ; Mogako	1501–1537	Jinghan Railway	?	2-6-0	Fives-Lille	37	1902–1905		
モガコ; Mogako	1541–1543	Jinghan Railway	Class 1400: 1400–1402	2-6-0	Saint-Léonard	3	1905		
モガロ; Mogaro	1501–1503~	Jinghan Railway	Class 100: 101–103~	2-6-0	Fives-Lille	>3	1901		
モガナ; Mogana	1501–1506	Jinpu Railway	?	2-6-0	Hanomag	6	1910–1911		
モガナ; Mogana	1511–1524	Jinpu Railway	Class 30: 30–43	2-6-0	Humboldt	14	1911?		
モガハ; Mogaha	1501–1515	Longhai Railway	?	2-6-0	Vulcan (UK)	15	1916–1919		
モガク; Mogaku	1501−15xx	Jinghai Railway	Class 90: 91−x	2-6-0	Baldwin	?	1901		
モガ_; Moga_	1501–1502	Daoqing Railway	?	2-6-0	ALCo	2	1913, 1918		
パシイ; Pashii	1501–1520	Jingsui Railway	?	4-6-2	ALCo	20	192x		
パシイ; Pashii	1521–1530	Beining Railway	Class 180: 180–189	4-6-2	Baldwin	10	1920–1925		
パシイ; Pashii	1531–1538	Jiaoji Railway	Class 400: 400–408	4-6-2	ALCo	8	1921		
パシイ; Pashii	1539–1540	Jiaoji Railway	Class 400: 409–410	4-6-2	Kisha Seizō	2	1922		
パシサ; Pashisa	1501–1520	new for NCTC	–	4-6-2	Hitachi	20	1938		"New National Small Pashi" (新國小パシ).
パシサ; Pashisa	1521–1550	new for NCTC	–	4-6-2	Kisha Seizō	30	1939–1940		"New National Small Pashi" (新國小パシ).
パシロ; Pashiro	1501–1512	MNR	パシロ566–569, 571–578	4-6-2	Kawasaki, Nippon Sharyō, Hitachi	12	1937		Superheated express passenger locomotives. First 12 transferred from Manchukuo National.
パシロ; Pashiro	1513–1589	new for NCTC	–	4-6-2	Kawasaki	57	1941–1944		Superheated express passenger locomotives. First 12 transferred from Manchukuo National.
パシナ; Pashina	1501–1512	Jinpu Railway	?	4-6-2	ALCo	12	1921		
パシナ; Pashina	1521–1528	Jinpu Railway	Class 410: 410–417	4-6-2	North British	8	1933		
プレコ; Pureko	1501–1510	Beining Railway	?	2-6-2T	North British	10	1887		
プレコ; Pureko	1511–1516	Beining Railway	?	2-6-2	North British	6	1914		
プレコ; Pureko	1521–1522	Jingsui Railway	?	2-6-2ST	North British	2	1908		
プレロ; Purero	15xx	Beining Railway	Class 20: 20–24	2-6-2T	North British/Tangshan	17	1921–1925		
プレロ; Purero	15xx	Beining Railway	Class 25: 25−xx	2-6-2	North British/Tangshan	?	1923–1927		
プレロ; Purero	15xx	Beining Railway	Class 150: 150–154~	2-6-2	Baldwin	?	1914		
プレロ; Purero	15xx incl. 1529	Beining Railway	?	2-6-2T	North British/Tangshan	?	1891–1896		
プレナ; Purena	15xx	Jingsui Railway	?	2-6-2	Baldwin	?	1921		
プレナ; Purena	15xx	Jingsui Railway	?	2-6-2	Baldwin	?	1909		
プレハ; Pureha	1501−15xx	Jingsui Railway	?	2-6-2	Baldwin	?	1911		
プレク; Pureku	1501–1540	Jinghan Railway	?	2-6-2	Franco-Belge	40	1920–1923		
プレク; Pureku	1541–1555	Jinghan Railway	Class 20: 20–34	2-6-2	Škoda	15	1936		
プレク; Pureku	1561–1570	Jinghan Railway	Class 350: 350–359	2-6-2	Lima	10	1920–1922		
プレチ; Purechi	1501–1505	Longhai Railway	Class 50: 51–55	2-6-2T	Tubize	5	1914		
?? (Shay)	1501–1506	Jingsui Railway	Class 25: 25–30	2+2+2	Lima	6	1909–1912		3-truck (Class C) Shay locomotive.
サタイ; Satai	1501–1506	Manchukuo National	ダブロ xxx	2-10-2T	Škoda	6	1929–1930		Originally CER class Ь 4001–4007, broad gauge; converted to standard gauge by MNR and transferred to NCTC.
サタイ; Satai	1507	Manchukuo National	ダブロ xxx	2-10-2T	Kawasaki	1	1930		Originally CER class Ь 4001–4007, broad gauge; converted to standard gauge by MNR and transferred to NCTC.
サタニ; Satani	1501–1510	Jinpu Railway	?	2-10-2	Krupp	10	1935		Similar to DRG Class 45.
サタサ; Satasa	1501	Longhai Railway	?	2-10-2	Tubize	1	1937		
シカコ; Shikako	1501−15xx	Jinghan Railway	Class 60: 60−xx	0-6-0T	Cockerill	?	1901		
ソリニ; Sorini	1501–1508	Longhai Railway	?	2-8-0	Tubize	8	1925		
ソリニ; Sorini	1511−15xx	Longhai Railway	?	2-8-0	SACM	?	1935–1936		
ソリシ; Sorishi	1501–1518	Huning Ry	?	2-8-0	?	18	1919 (to China)		18 ROD 2-8-0 bought by Huning Railway in 1919.
ソリシ; Sorishi	1519–1521	Shenhai Railway	?	2-8-0	North British	3	1926 (to China)		3 ROD 2-8-0 bought by Shenhai Railway in 1926.
ソリシ; Sorishi	1522–1537	Beining Railway	?	2-8-0	Baldwin	16	1920		
ソリコ; Soriko	1501–1650	JGR	various	2-8-0	Kawasaki, Kisha Seizō, JGR Ogura Works	150	1938–1939 (to China)		JGR Class 9600 locomotives converted to standard gauge and delivered to NCTC.
ソリナ; Sorina	1501–1510	Jinghan Railway	?	2-8-0	ALCo	10	1917		
テホニ; Tehoni	1501–1506	Jiaoji Railway	Class 70: 70–75	4-6-0	Vulcan Stettin	6	1910–1911		
テホニ; Tehoni	1507–1523	Jiaoji Railway	?	4-6-0	Vulcan Stettin	17	1901–1905		
テホニ; Tehoni	1524–1535	Jinpu Railway	?	4-6-0	Hawthorn Leslie	12	1910		
テホサ; Tehosa	1501–1510~	Beining Railway	Class 110: 110–119~	4-6-0	North British/Tangshan	>10	1910–1919		Rebuilt with superheaters in the late 1930s.
テホシ; Tehoshi	1501–1505	Jiaoji Railway	Class 300: 301–305	4-6-0	Schwartzkopff	5	1913		
テホコ; Tehoko	1501–1511~	?	?	4-6-0	Henschel, Hanomag	>11	1910–1913		
テホロ; Tehoro	1501–1510	Jinghan Railway	?	4-6-0	Tubize?	10	1913–1914		
テホナ; Tehona	1501–1532	Jinghan Railway	Class 200: 201–232	4-6-0	France	32	1904–1907		
テホナ; Tehona	1541–1550	Longhai Railway	?	4-6-0	France	10	1909		

==== Narrow gauge ====
Class	Numbers	Original owner	Original class & numbers	Wheel arr.	Builder	Total in class	Year built	Image	Notes
デカA; DekaA	1501–1550~	Tongpu Railway	Class 300: 300–349	2-10-0	Henschel	~50	1937		1000 mm.
デカB; DekaB	1501–1550~	Tongpu Railway	Class 350: 350–399~	2-10-0	Kisha Seizō, Hitachi	~50	1936		1000 mm.
ホネA; HoneA	1501–1530	Zhengtai Railway	Class 100: 100–129	0-6-4T	Fives-Lille	?	1906		1000 mm. Forney locomotive.
モガA; MogaA	1501−15xx	Tongpu Railway	Class 100: 100−1xx	2-6-0	ALCo	<10	1908		
モガB; MogaB	1501–1503~	Tongpu Railway	Class 110: 110–112~	2-6-0	Henschel	>3	1934–1935		1067 mm.
モガC; MogaC	1501−15xx	Japanese Government Railways	Class 8620: 78625, others?	2-6-0	Kawasaki (78625)	?	1924 (78625)		1067 mm. JGR Class 8620 supplied second-hand after 1938.
プレA; PureA	1501–1560	Japanese Government Railways	Class C12: 101–102; 103–105; 106; 107–109; 110–113; 114–135; 136–138; 139–143; 144–147; 148–154; 155–156; 157–160	2-6-2T	Nippon Sharyō; Mitsubishi; Kawasaki; Kisha Seizō; Hitachi; Kawasaki; Hitachi; Nippon Sharyō; Kawasaki; Kisha Seizō; Nippon Sharyō; Kisha Seizō	60	1935–1937		1067 mm. JGR Class C12 converted to 1000 mm and shipped to NCTC.
プレB; PureB	1501–1502	?	?	2-6-2	Kawasaki	2	1923, 1927		
シカ; Shika	1501–1505~	Tongpu Railway	LCK10	0-6-0T	Barclay	1?	1913		1067 mm.
シカ; Shika	1501–1505~	Tongpu Railway	LCK20	0-6-0T	Vulcan Iron Works (UK)	1?	1910		762 mm.
シカ; Shika	1501–1505~	Tongpu Railway	5−x	0-6-0T	Japan	>1	1921		
シカ; Shika	1501–1505~	Zhengtai Railway	Class 10: 11~	0-6-0T	France	>1	1905		
ソリA; SoriA	1501–1526	Japanese Government Railway	Clasa 9050: ?	2-8-0	various	26	1937–1938 (regauged)		1067 mm. JGR Class C12 converted to 1000 mm and shipped to NCTC.

== Services ==
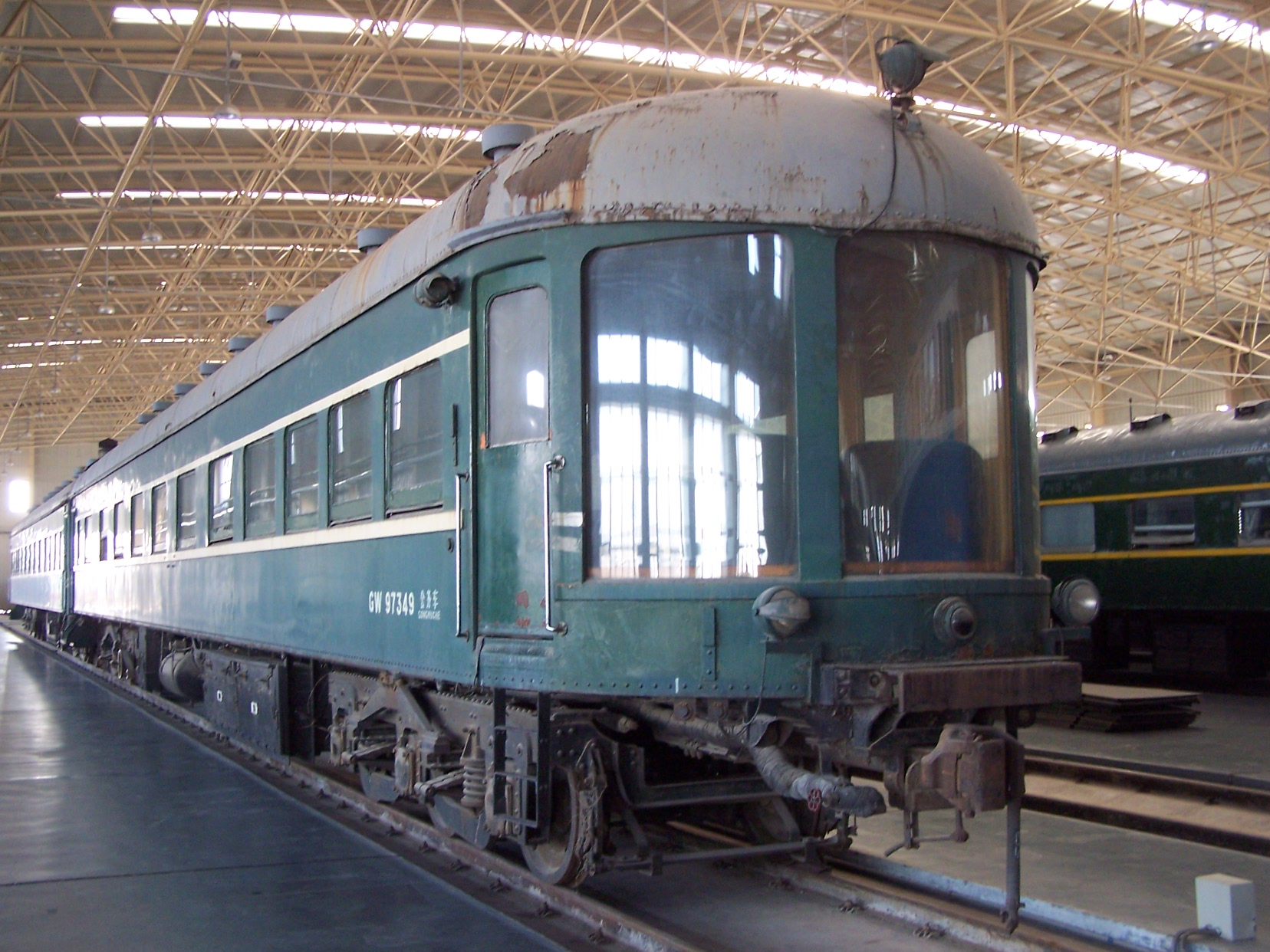
Observation car formerly used on the Tairiku Express, now preserved at the Beijing Railway Museum.

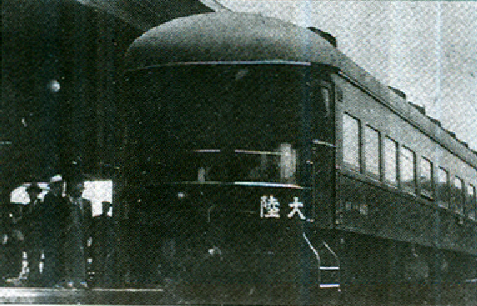
The same observation car in service on the Tairiku at Gyeongseong, Korea.

The North China Transportation Company ran a number of long-distance trains, both within China and in conjunction with the South Manchuria Railway and the Chosen Government Railway. Notable trains include the "Tairiku" ("Continental") and "Kōa" limited express trains between Beijing and Busan, Korea. The "Tairiku" entered service in 1938, making the trip from Busan to Beijing in 37.5 hours in 1940; the train was discontinued in 1944. The observation car used on this train is preserved at the Beijing Railway Museum. The "Kōa" was put into operation in 1939, making the same trip in 39.5 hours in 1940, but by 1945 the trip took 49 hours. The "Kōa" was discontinued after the Japanese defeat in the Pacific War.
