= China Railways JF21 =

Class of 2-8-2 steam locomotives in China

China Railways JF21 (解放21)
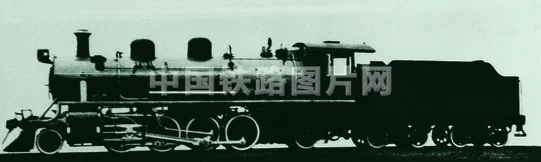
Type and origin
- Power type: Steam
- Builder: American Locomotive Company
- Build date: 1937
Specifications
- Configuration
  - Whyte: 2-8-2
- Gauge: 1,435 mm (4 ft 8 1/2 in)
- Driver dia.: 1,370 mm (4 ft 6 in)
- Length: 20,975 mm (68 ft 9.8 in)
- Total weight: 135.66 t (133.52 long tons)
- Fuel type: Coal
- Cylinders: Two, outside
Career
- Operators: Yuehan Railway; Central China Railway; China Railway
- Class: CR: ㄇㄎ21 (1951−1959); CR: 解放21 (1959–end)
- Disposition: All scrapped

The China Railways JF21 (解放21, Jiěfàng, "liberation") class steam locomotive was a class of 2-8-2 "Mikado" type steam locomotives operated by the China Railway, built by the American Locomotive Company in the United States in 1937.

These locomotives were originally built for the Yuehan Railway, and after the establishment of the Japanese puppet government of the Reformed Government of the Republic of China, they were operated by the Central China Railway, which had been created in 1939 to manage all railway operations in the territory of the collaborationist government by nationalising all privately owned railways in the territory.

After the end of the Pacific War, these locomotives were passed on to the Republic of China Railway. After the establishment of the People's Republic of China, China Railways designated them ㄇㄎ21 (MK21) class in 1951, and they were retired in 1955.
