= China Railways JF12 =

Steam locomotive

China Railways JF12 (解放12) Jingsui Railway Class 300 North China Transport Mikana class (シカナ)
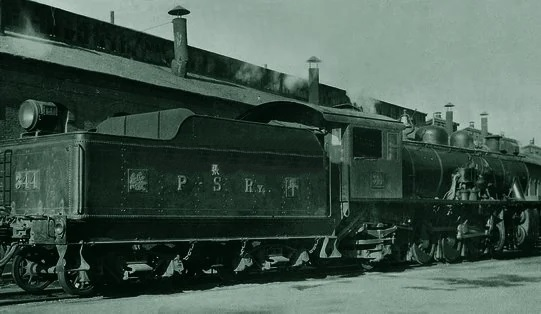
Type and origin
- Power type: Steam
- Builder: American Locomotive Company
- Build date: 1922
- Total produced: 46
Specifications
- Configuration
  - Whyte: 2-8-2
- Gauge: 1,435 mm (4 ft 8 1/2 in)
- Driver dia.: 1,270 mm (4 ft 2 in)
- Length: 20,218 mm (66 ft 4.0 in)
- Total weight: 135.77 t (133.63 long tons)
- Fuel type: Coal
- Cylinders: Two, outside
Career
- Operators: Jingsui Railway, North China Transportation Company, China Railway
- Class: JR: 300 class NCTC: シカナ (1932−1938); CR: ㄇㄎ12 (1951−1959); CR: 解放12 (1959–end)
- Number in class: 46
- Numbers: JR: 301−346; CR: 3811–3840
- Disposition: All scrapped

The China Railways JF12 (解放12, Jiěfàng, "liberation") class steam locomotive was a class of 2-8-2 "Mikado" type steam locomotives operated by the China Railway, built by the ALCO in the United States in 1922.

== History ==
In 1922, the Jingsui Railway (Beijing−Hohhot, now part of the Beijing–Baotou Railway) took delivery of 46 2-8-2 locomotives from ALCo, which they numbered 301−346. After the Japanese established the puppet Provisional Government of the Republic of China, this and other privately owned railways in the territory of the collaborationist government were merged in 1938 to form the North China Transportation Company to manage all railway and bus transportation in the territory. As a subsidiary of the South Manchuria Railway, North China Transport used the same classification system for locomotives as the SMR did, under which these engines were designated Mikana (シカナ) class.

== Postwar ==
After the end of the Pacific War, thirty of these locomotives were passed on to the Republic of China Railway. After the establishment of the People's Republic of China, China Railways designated them ㄇㄎ12 (MK12) class in 1951, and subsequently 解放12 (JF12) class in 1959. JF12 3822, 3832−3834, and 3838 were noted to be in dump around Lanzhou, Hohhot, Baotou and other places in October 1985. The last of these locomotives were retired in 1990.
