= China Railways JF3 =

China Railways JF3 (解放3) Manchukuo National Mikasa class (ミカサ)
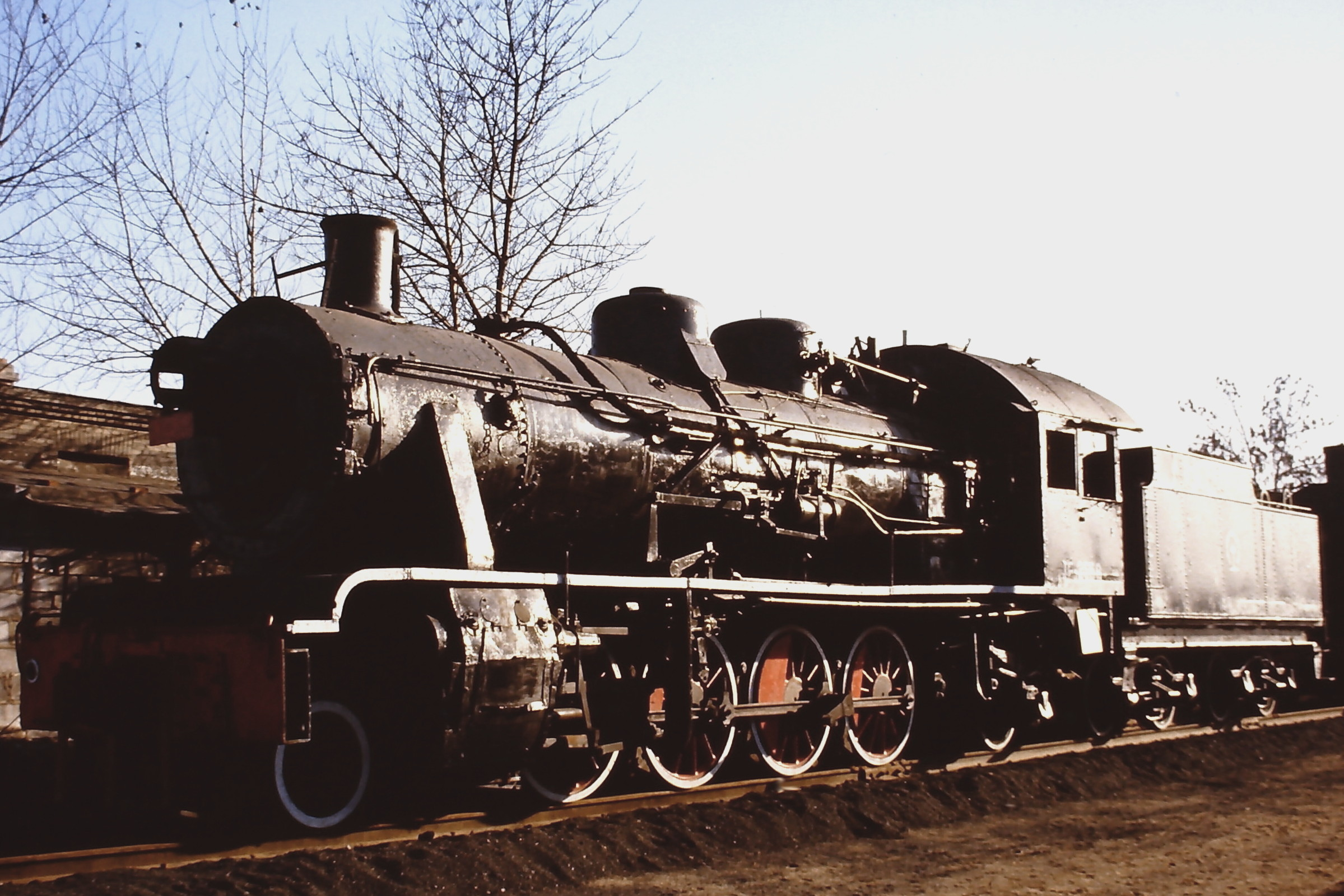
- JF3-2558 at the Shenyang Steam Locomotive Museum
Type and origin
- Power type: Steam
- Builder: Škoda Works
- Build date: 1927–1930
- Total produced: 19
Specifications
- Configuration
  - Whyte: 2-8-2
- Gauge: 1,435 mm (4 ft 8 1/2 in)
- Driver dia.: 1,400 mm (4 ft 7 in)
- Length: 20,320 mm (66 ft 8 in)
- Total weight: 135.5 t (133.4 long tons)
- Fuel type: Coal
- Cylinders: Two, outside
Career
- Operators: Qike Railway, Huhai Railway, Sitao Railway, Manchukuo National Railway, China Railway
- Class: MNR: ミカニ (1932−1938); MNR: ミカサ (1938−1945); CR: ㄇㄎ3 (1951−1959), CR: 解放3 (1959–end)
- Number in class: 19
- Numbers: CR: 2551–2700
- Retired: 1990
- Preserved: JF3 2558
- Disposition: 1 preserved, remainder scrapped

The China Railways JF3 (解放3, Jiěfàng, "liberation") class steam locomotive was a class of 2-8-2 "Mikado" type steam locomotives operated by the China Railway, built by the Škoda Works in Czechoslovakia in 1927–1930.

== History ==
These locomotives were originally built for the Qike Railway, the Huhai Railway, and the Sitao Railway. After the Japanese established the puppet state of Manchukuo, these and other privately owned railways in the territory of Manchukuo were nationalised to create the Manchukuo National Railway, which designated these the Mikani (ミカニ) class. In 1938 they were reclassified Mikasa (ミカサ) class.

After the end of the Pacific War, these locomotives were passed on to the Republic of China Railway. After the establishment of the People's Republic of China, China Railways designated them ㄇㄎ3 (MK3) class in 1951, and subsequently 解放3 (JF3) class in 1959. This class has not been informed since three generations were seen in the 1980s.

== Postwar ==
The last of these locomotives were retired in 1990, and one, JF3 2558, is preserved at the Shenyang Steam Locomotive Museum.

== See also ==
- List of locomotives in China
- China Railways JF13: in common with JF3 of manufacturer.
