= China Railways JF2 =

China Railways JF2 (解放2) Mantetsu Mikani class (ミカニ)
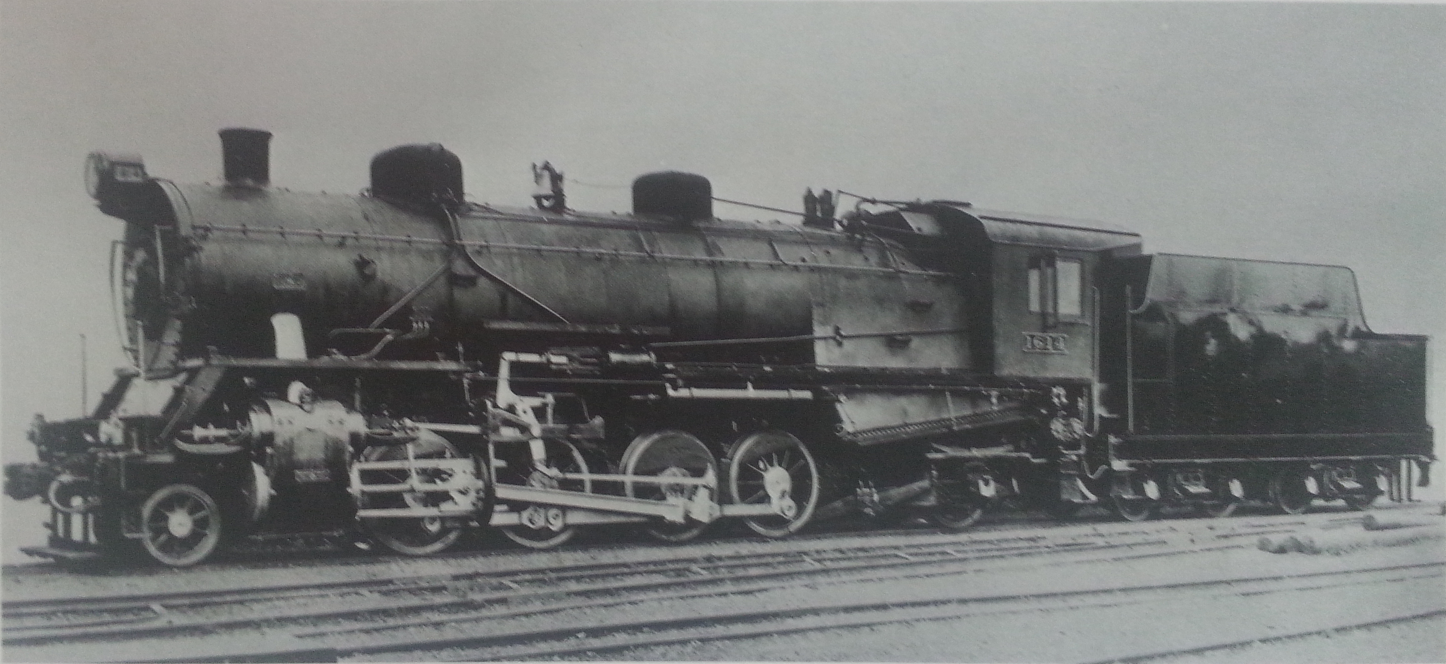
- Builder's photo of ミカニ1614.
Type and origin
- Power type: Steam
- Builder: ALCO, Kawasaki, Kisha Seizō, South Manchuria Ry. Shahekou Works
- Build date: 1924–1932
- Total produced: 41
Specifications
- Configuration
  - Whyte: 2-8-2
- Gauge: 1,435 mm (4 ft 8 1/2 in) standard gauge
- Driver dia.: 1,370 mm (53.94 in)
- Axle load: 23.24 t (22.87 long tons; 25.62 short tons)
- Adhesive weight: 84.25 t (82.92 long tons; 92.87 short tons)
- Loco weight: 115.80 t (113.97 long tons; 127.65 short tons)
- Tender weight: 75.9 t (74.7 long tons; 83.7 short tons)
- Fuel type: Coal
- Firebox
  - Grate area: 6.25 m^{2} (67.3 sq ft)
- Boiler pressure: 12.7 kgf/cm^{2} (181 psi; 1,250 kPa)
- Cylinders: Three
- Cylinder size: 572 mm × 660 mm (22.5 in × 26.0 in)
Performance figures
- Maximum speed: 101 km/h (63 mph)
- Tractive effort: 252.0 kN (56,700 lb_{f})
Career
- Operators: South Manchuria Railway; China Railway
- Class: SMR: ミカニ; CR: ㄇㄎ貳 (1951–1959); CR: 解放2 (1959–end)
- Number in class: 41
- Numbers: SMR: 1600–1640 (1924–1938); SMR: ミカニ1–41 (1938–1945); CR: in the 2501–2550 range
- Preserved: CR 2525
- Disposition: 1 preserved, remainder scrapped

The China Railways JF2 (解放2, Jiěfàng, "liberation") class steam locomotive was a class of 2-8-2 "Mikado" type steam locomotives for goods trains operated by the China Railway. They were originally built for the South Manchuria Railway (Mantetsu) by several American and Japanese manufacturers, as well as by Mantetsu's Shahekou Works, between 1924 and 1932.

== History ==
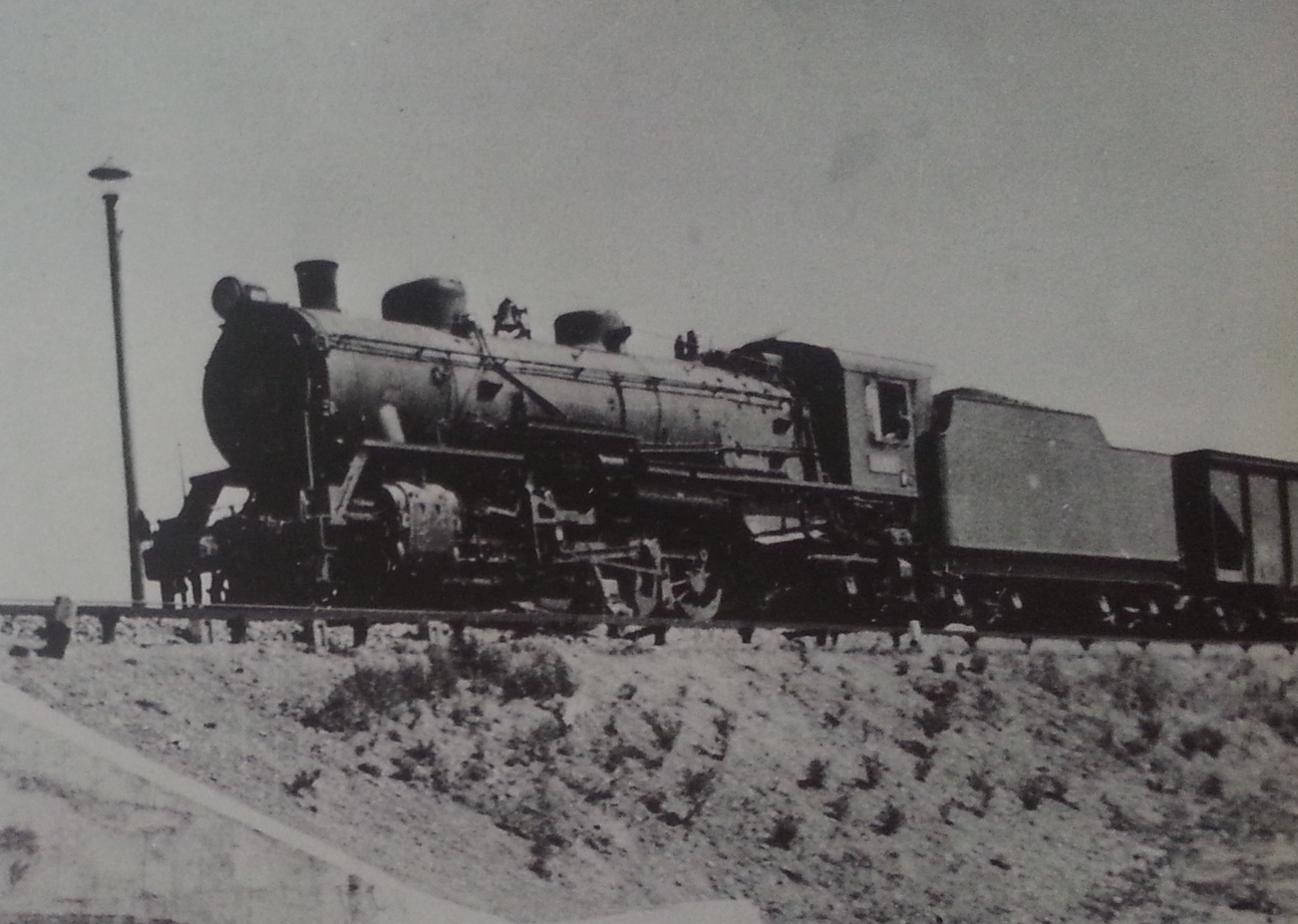
A Mikani class locomotive in service with Mantetsu, with a Ta6 class coal hopper behind it.

To fill the need for powerful locomotives to haul heavy goods trains from the Fushun Coal Mines and Dalian, Mantetsu ordered the first five Mikani class locomotives from the American Locomotive Company of Schenectady, New York in 1924. After completion of the superheated three-cylinder locomotives, extensive performance tests were conducted, the results of which attracted considerable attention from the railway industry; despite a wheel diameter of only 1,370 mm (54 in), they reached a maximum speed of 101.4 km/h (63.0 mph). They were immediately successful, and production of copies began at Mantetsu's Shahekou Works in 1926. They were the first Mantetsu locomotives to weigh over 100 t (98 long tons; 110 short tons), as well as the first to be built with automatic stokers. Although their performance was excellent, the complexity of the three-cylinder arrangement led to consideration of a superheated 2-10-2 tender locomotive design as a replacement. However, this plan was abandoned, and more Mikanis were built instead. After a number of incidents involving broken crankshafts, the Mikashi class was designed as the successor to the class in 1933.

Owner	Class & numbers (1924–1938)	Class & numbers (1938–1945)	Builder	Year	Works numbers
Mantetsu	ミカニ1600–ミカニ1604	ミカニ1–ミカニ5	ALCO	1924	65435–65439
Mantetsu	ミカニ1605–ミカニ1608	ミカニ6–ミカニ9	South Manchuria Ry. Shahekou Works	1926	
Mantetsu	ミカニ1609–ミカニ1613	ミカニ10–ミカニ14	Shahekou Works	1927	
Mantetsu	ミカニ1614–ミカニ1616	ミカニ15–ミカニ17	Kawasaki	1927	1248–1250
Mantetsu	ミカニ1617–ミカニ1620	ミカニ18–ミカニ21	Kisha Seizō	1928	1012–1015
Mantetsu	ミカニ1621–ミカニ1626	ミカニ22–ミカニ27	Shahekou Works	1928	
Mantetsu	ミカニ1627–ミカニ1634	ミカニ28–ミカニ35	Shahekou Works	1929	
Mantetsu	ミカニ1635–ミカニ1637	ミカニ36–ミカニ38	Shahekou Works	1930	
Mantetsu	ミカニ1638–ミカニ1639	ミカニ39–ミカニ40	Shahekou Works	1931	
Mantetsu	ミカニ1640	ミカニ41	Shahekou Works	1932	

== Postwar ==
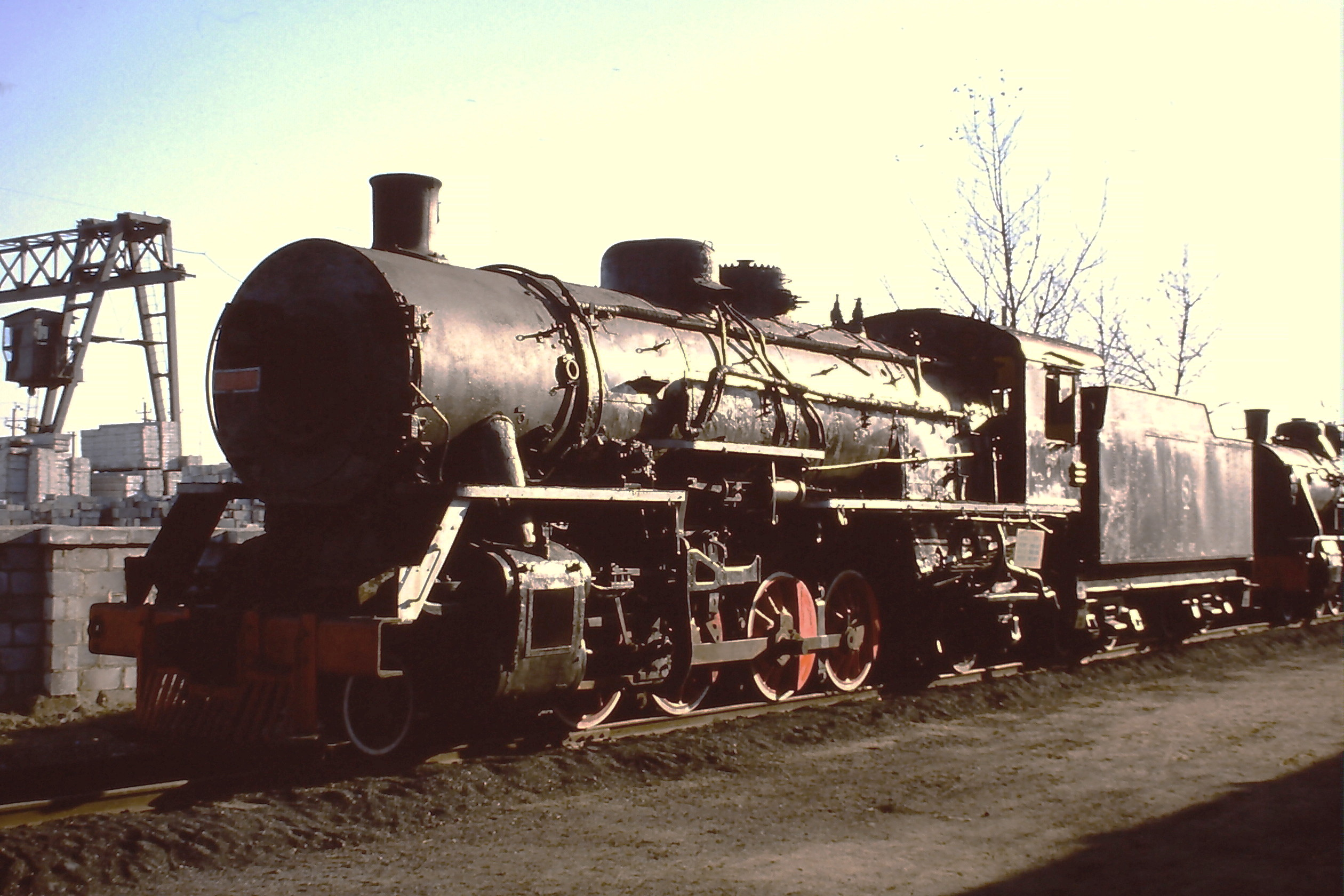
JF2-2525 at the Shenyang Steam Locomotive Museum.

At the end of the Pacific War, the 41 Mikani class locomotives were divided between the Dalian (35) and the Fengtian (6) depots, and all were taken over by the Republic of China Railway. Following the establishment of the People's Republic and the subsequent creation of the current China Railway, they became class ㄇㄎ貳 (MK2) in 1951, and class 解放2 (JF2, jiěfàng, "liberation") in 1959. Numbered in the 2501–2550 range, they were assigned to the Wafangdian locomotive depot in Dalian and used primarily on heavy goods trains. JF2 2525 is preserved at the Shenyang Steam Locomotive Museum.This class was last seen in the 1980s. This class retired 1990.
