= China Railways JF17 =

China Railways JF17 (解放17) Jiaoji Railway Class 600 North China Transport Mikana class (ミカナ)
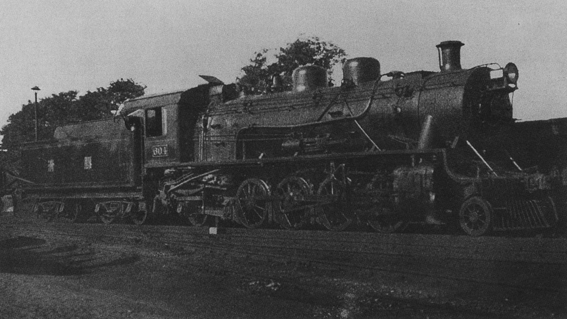
- Jiaoji Railway No. 604, built by Shahekou Works in 1931
Type and origin
- Power type: Steam
- Builder: Shahekou, Hudswell Clarke
- Build date: 1931
- Total produced: >4
Specifications
- Configuration
  - Whyte: 2-8-2
- Gauge: 1,435 mm (4 ft 8 1/2 in)
- Length: 21,517 mm (70 ft 7.1 in)
- Total weight: 145.37 t (143.07 long tons)
- Fuel type: Coal
- Cylinders: Two, outside
Career
- Operators: Jiaoji Railway, North China Transport, China Railway
- Class: JR: 600 series (1931−1938); NCTC: ミカナ (1938−1945); CR: ㄇㄎ17 (1951−1959); CR: 解放17 (1959–end)
- Number in class: >4
- Numbers: JR: 601−604~; NCTC: 1651−1654~
- Retired: 1990
- Preserved: JF17 604
- Disposition: 1 preserved, remainder scrapped

The China Railways JF17 (解放17, Jiěfàng, "liberation") class steam locomotive was a class of 2-8-2 "Mikado" type steam locomotives operated by the China Railway, built by Hudswell Clarke in the United Kingdom and by the South Manchuria Railway's Shahekou Works in 1931.

At least four of these locomotives were originally built for the Jiaoji Railway, which numbered them in the 600 series. After the establishment of the collaborationist Provisional Government of the Republic of China during the Japanese occupation of China, the North China Transportation Company was formed in 1938 to operate railways in the territory of the Provisional Government, nationalising the various privately owned railways, including the Jihai Railway. North China Transport then designated these Mikana (ミカナ) class.

After the end of the Pacific War, these locomotives were passed on to the Republic of China Railway. After the establishment of the People's Republic of China, China Railways designated them ㄇㄎ17 (MK17) class in 1951, and subsequently 解放17 (JF17) class in 1959. All were retired by 1990.
