= China Railways JF4 =

China Railways JF4 (解放4) Mantetsu Mikashi class (ミカシ)
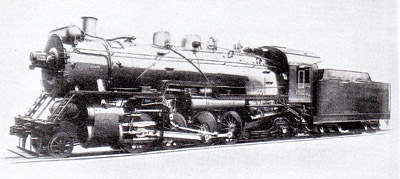
- Builder's photo of ミカシ1661, built by Kisha Seizō in 1935
Type and origin
- Power type: Steam
- Builder: Kawasaki (11); Kisha Seizō (4)
- Build date: 1935
- Total produced: 15
Specifications
- Configuration
  - Whyte: 2-8-2
- Gauge: 1,435 mm (4 ft 8 1/2 in) standard gauge
- Driver dia.: 1,500 mm (59.06 in)
- Axle load: 23.00 t (22.64 long tons; 25.35 short tons)
- Adhesive weight: 91.72 t (90.27 long tons; 101.10 short tons)
- Loco weight: 124.64 t (122.67 long tons; 137.39 short tons)
- Tender weight: 75.76 t (74.56 long tons; 83.51 short tons)
- Fuel type: Coal
- Firebox
  - Grate area: 6.25 m^{2} (67.3 sq ft)
- Boiler pressure: 17.0 kgf/cm^{2} (242 psi; 1,670 kPa)
- Superheater: Schmidt type E
- Cylinders: Two, outside
- Cylinder size: 630 mm × 760 mm (24.80 in × 29.92 in)
Career
- Operators: South Manchuria Railway; China Railway
- Class: SMR: ミカシ; CR: ㄇㄎ肆 (1951–1959); CR: 解放4 (1959–end)
- Number in class: 17
- Numbers: SMR: 1650–1664 (1935–1938); SMR: ミカシ1–15 (1938–1945); CR: 2701–2715
- Disposition: All scrapped

The China Railways JF4 (解放4, Jiěfàng, "liberation") class steam locomotive was a class of superheated 2-8-2 "Mikado" type steam locomotives for goods trains operated by the China Railway. They were originally built for the South Manchuria Railway (Mantetsu) in Japan in 1935.

== History ==
After a number of incidents involving broken crankshafts in the Mikani class locomotives, as well as needing more motive power to meet the increase in goods traffic following the establishment of Manchukuo, the Mikashi class was designed in 1933 and put into production in 1935, with fifteen built in Japan that year, four by Kisha Seizō and eleven by Kawasaki.

As the three-cylinder design of the Mikani class was deemed too complex, the Mikashi class returned to the proven two-cylinder layout. In order to achieve a tractive effort equal to or greater than that of the three-cylinder locomotives with a two-cylinder engine, it is necessary to increase the adhesive weight of the locomotive; however, this would make the axle load unacceptably high - between 24.0 t (23.6 long tons) and 25.6 t (25.2 long tons). To overcome this, a limited cutoff system was adopted with a maximum cutoff of 50%; by balancing the rotational forces of the left and right cylinders, the axle load was successfully limited to 23.0 t (22.6 long tons).

Boiler pressure was increased from 12.7 to 17.0 kgf/cm^{2} (181 to 242 psi; 1,245 to 1,667 kPa), whilst other new features included a Schmidt type E superheater, a feedwater heater and a combustion chamber firebox. Fuel consumption was also improved, with the Mikashi class using from 10% to up to 22.6% less coal than the Mikani class. The wheel diameter was also increased from 1,370 to 1,500 mm (53.94 to 59.06 in) in order to increase the speed of goods trains, however as this could result in wheel slippage on steeper sections due to the reduction in piston speed, so the timetables of goods trains were adjusted accordingly. Used primarily on heavy goods trains between Fengtian and Dalian to transport coal from the Fushun Coal Mine to port, they could pull up to sixty 30 t (30 long tons; 33 short tons) coal hoppers.

Owner	Class & numbers (1935–1938)	Class & numbers (1938–1945)	Builder	Year
Mantetsu	ミカシ1650–ミカシ1660	ミカシ1–ミカシ11	Kawasaki	1935
Mantetsu	ミカシ1661–ミカシ1664	ミカシ12–ミカシ15	Kisha Seizō	1935

== Postwar ==
At the end of the Pacific War, the 15 Mikashi class locomotives were divided between the Dalian (13) and the Fengtian (2) depots, and all were taken over by the Republic of China Railway. Following the establishment of the People's Republic and the subsequent creation of the current China Railway, they became class ㄇㄎ肆 (MK4) in 1951, and class 解放4 (JF4, jiěfàng, "liberation") in 1959 and numbered 2701–2715. As during the Mantetsu times, they were primarily used around Dalian and Shenyang (formerly Fengtian). This class retired 1990.
