= China Railways JF7 =

Class of 24 Chinese 2-8-2 locomotives

China Railways JF7 (解放7) Jingfeng Railway 200 series North China Transport Mikana class (ミカナ)
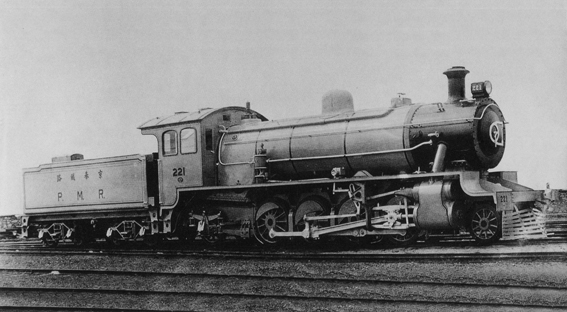
- No. 221 as delivered to the Jingfeng Railway (also known as the Peiping−Mukden Railway)
Type and origin
- Power type: Steam
- Builder: North British, Tangshan Arsenal
- Build date: 1913–1924
- Total produced: 24
Specifications
- Configuration
  - Whyte: 2-8-2
- Gauge: 1,435 mm (4 ft 8 1/2 in)
- Length: 20,666 mm (67 ft 9.6 in)
- Total weight: 137.31 t (135.14 long tons)
- Fuel type: Coal
- Cylinders: Two, outside
Career
- Operators: Jingfeng Railway (PMR), North China Transportation Company, China Railway
- Class: NCTC: ミカナ (1938−1945); CR: ㄇㄎ7 (1951−1959); CR: 解放7 (1959–end)
- Number in class: >21
- Numbers: PMR: 201−224; NCTC: 1501−1524; CR: 3601–3624
- Preserved: 2
- Disposition: 2 preserved, remainder scrapped

The China Railways JF7 (解放7, Jiěfàng, "liberation") class steam locomotive was a class of 2-8-2 "Mikado" type steam locomotives operated by the China Railway, built by the North British Locomotive Company and assembled by the Tangshan Arsenal, as well as American builders between 1913 and 1924.

Twenty-four of these locomotives were originally built for the Jingfeng Railway (also known as the Peking−Mukden Railway in English). After the Japanese established the puppet Provisional Government of the Republic of China in 1938 (part of the collaborationist Republic of China from 1940 to 1945), these and other privately owned railways in the territory of Provisional Government were nationalised to create the North China Transportation Company (a subsidiary of the South Manchuria Railway, which designated these the Mikana (ミカナ) class.

After the end of the Pacific War, these locomotives were passed on to the Republic of China Railway. After the establishment of the People's Republic of China, China Railways designated them ㄇㄎ7 (MK7) class in 1951, and subsequently 解放7 (JF7) class in 1959; they were numbered in the 3601–3650, though the total number of engines is unknown.

JF7-3608 was seen at Yanzhou in 1981. The last of these locomotives were retired in 1990.
