= China Railways JF13 =

Class of Chinese steam locomotives

China Railways JF13 (解放13) North China Transport Mikaha class (ミカハ)
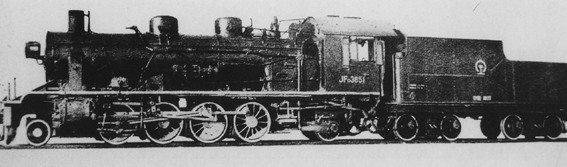
- China Railways JF13 3851
Type and origin
- Power type: Steam
- Builder: Škoda Works
- Build date: 1939
- Total produced: 45
Specifications
- Configuration
  - Whyte: 2-8-2
- Gauge: 1,435 mm (4 ft 8 1/2 in)
- Driver dia.: 1,370 mm (4 ft 6 in)
- Length: 22,170 mm (72 ft 9 in)
- Total weight: 146.5 t (144.2 long tons)
- Fuel type: Coal
- Cylinders: Two, outside
Career
- Operators: North China Transport; China Railway
- Class: NCTC: ミカハ (1939−1945); CR: ㄇㄎ13 (1951−1959); CR: 解放13 (1959–end)
- Number in class: 45
- Numbers: CR: 3841–3885
- Retired: 1990
- Disposition: All scrapped

The China Railways JF13 (解放13, Jiěfàng, "liberation") class steam locomotive was a class of 2-8-2 "Mikado" type steam locomotives operated by the China Railway, built by the Škoda Works in Czechoslovakia in 1939.

These locomotives were originally built for the North China Transportation Company, which had been formed in 1938 to operate railways in the collaborationist Provisional Government of the Republic of China during the Japanese occupation of China. A total of 45 were delivered to NCTC, which designated them Mikaha (ミカハ) class.

After the end of the Pacific War, these locomotives were passed on to the Republic of China Railway. After the establishment of the People's Republic of China, China Railways designated them ㄇㄎ13 (MK13) class in 1951, and subsequently 解放13 (JF13) class in 1959. The last of these locomotives known to be operational were JF13 3859, observed working at the Changxindian Crane Works in Beijing in 1981, and JF13 3876 at the Hegang Mining Railway in Heilongjiang province, where it was last seen in 1986. And retired 1990.

== See also ==
- List of locomotives in China
- China Railways JF3: in common with JF13 of manufacturer.
