= Tianjin–Pukou railway =

Railway line in People's Republic of China

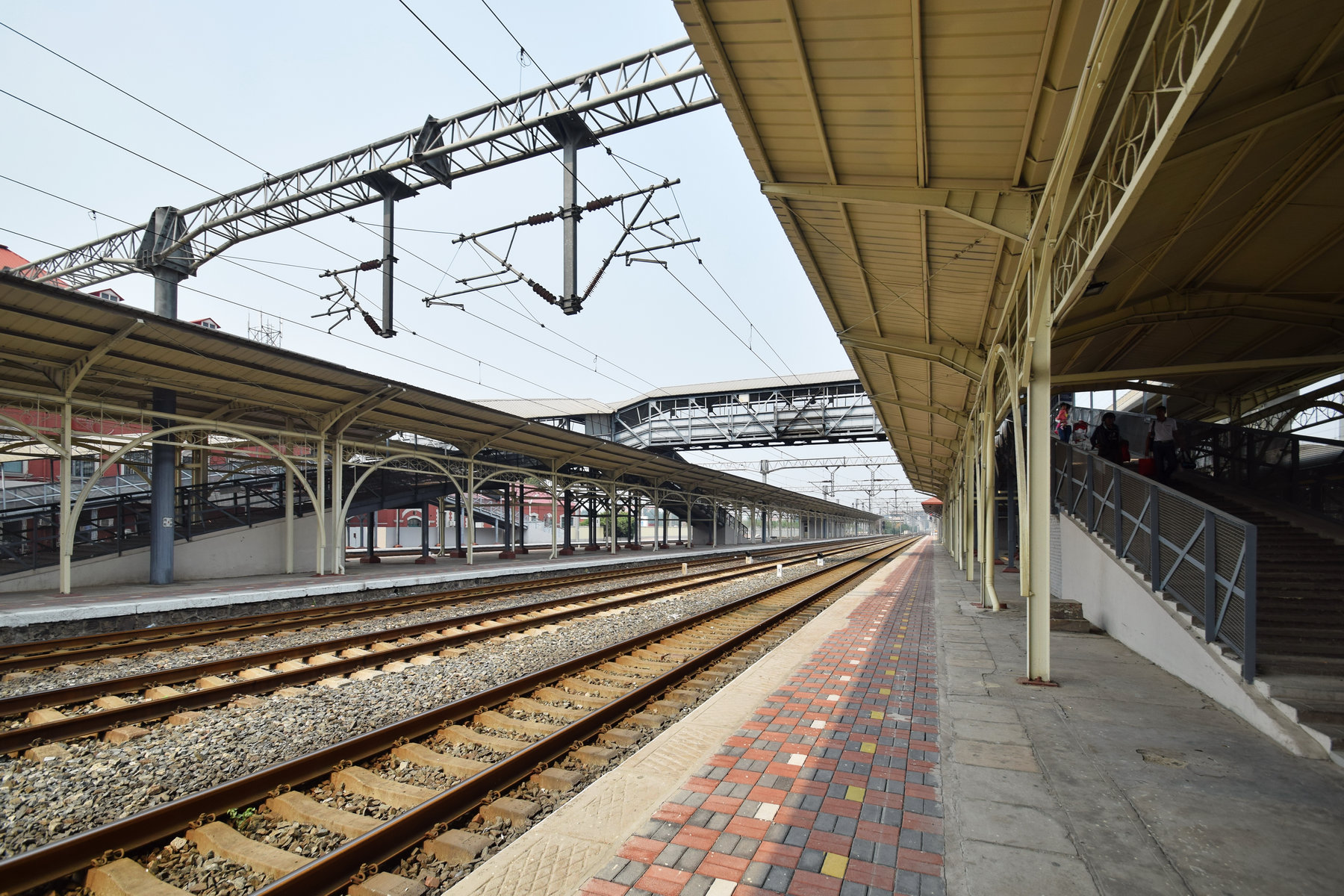
Tianjian North Railway station tracks

The Tianjin–Pukou or Jinpu railway (Postal spelling: Tientsin-Pukow Railway; simplified Chinese: 津浦铁路; traditional Chinese: 津浦鐵路; pinyin: Jīnpǔ Tiělù) runs from Tianjin to Pukou district outside Nanjing in Jiangsu province. Pukou was the nearest station to Nanjing on the left bank (west or north bank) of the Yangtze River from central Nanjing, which lies on the right bank (east or south bank). For most of the 20th century, rail carriages were ferried across the river to continue their journey into Nanjing and then on to Shanghai. Since 1968, when a bridge was built across the river, the Jinpu railway has formed part of the Beijing–Shanghai railway, connecting China's two largest cities.

== History ==
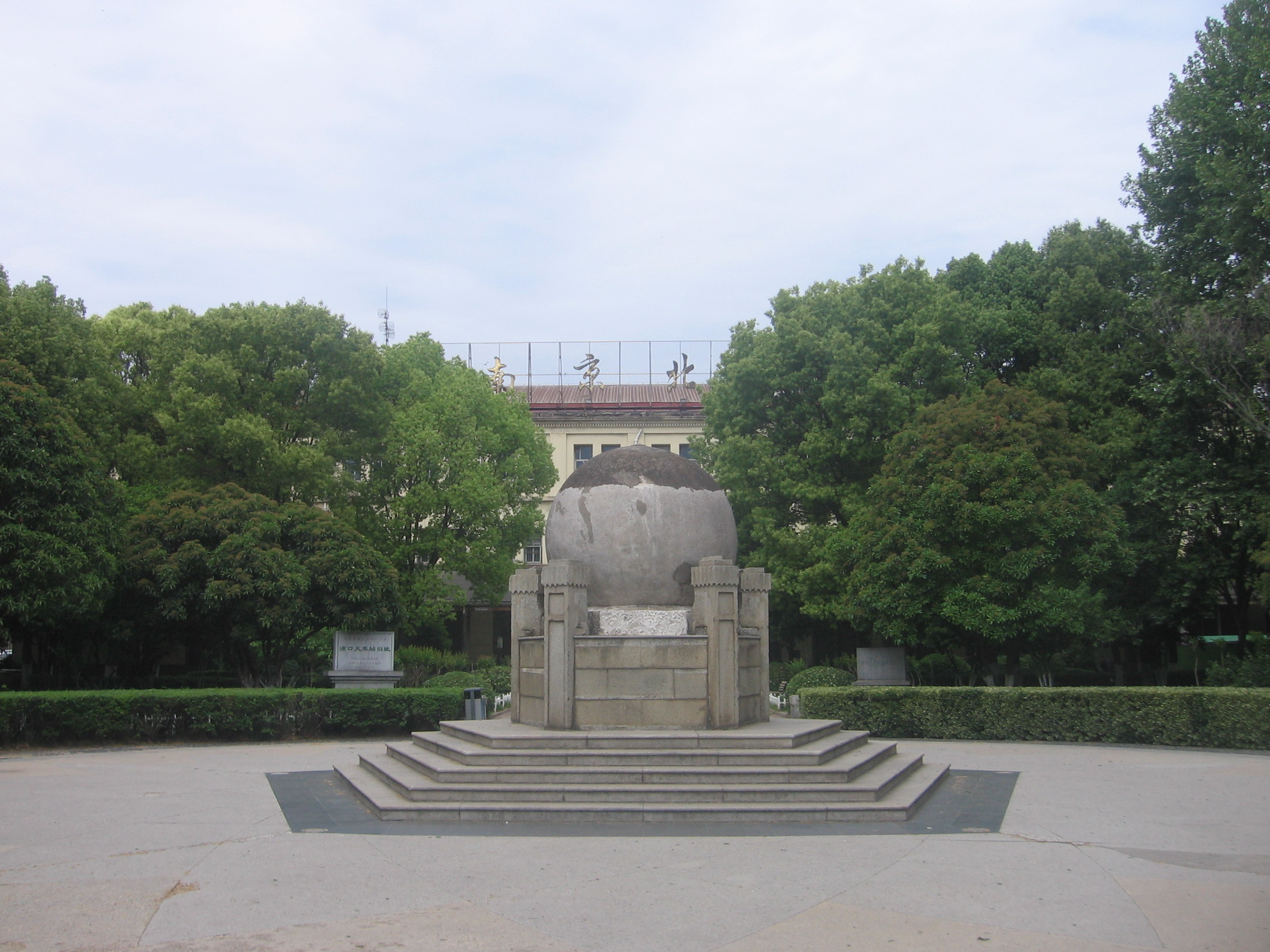
Pukou Railway Station

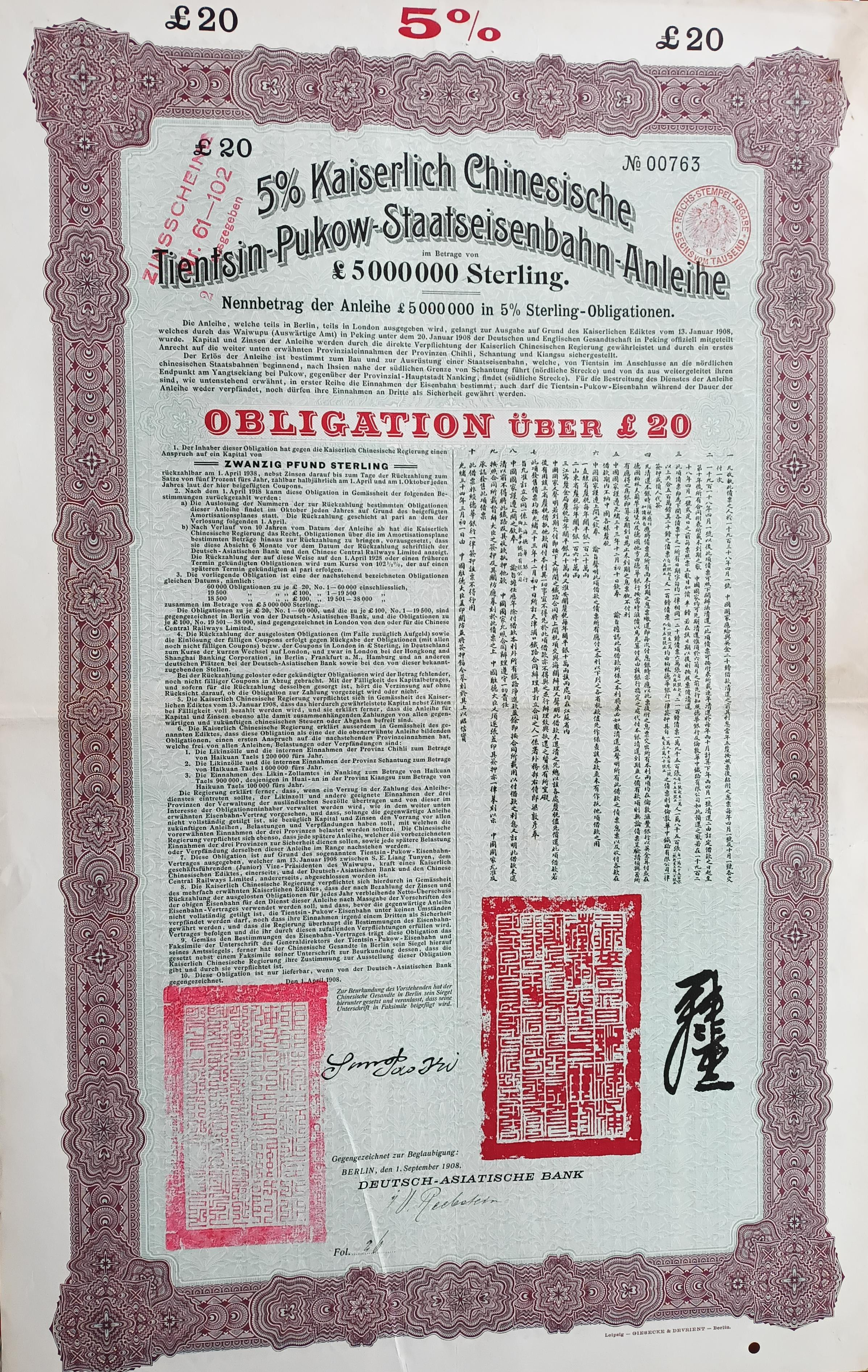
Bond of the Tianjin–Pukou railway, issued 1 April 1908

The first proposals to build railways in China began in the 1860s with opposition from the elite, who worried that it would increase the likelihood of regime change. However, following China's loss in the First Sino-Japanese War in 1895, the desire to modernize began to predominate. However, due to technical and financial constraints, foreign support was needed to build the earliest railways. At a conference in London in September 1898, British and German capitalists decided to build a railway from Tianjin to Zhenjiang. In May 1899, the Qing government agreed to the financing of the railway construction along with a series of bank loans. The proposed course for the railway was to connect the political center of China in the north to the economic hub in the southern region, as well as the Yangtze River. Construction of the railway began in 1908 and the line was completed in 1912. All together, the original railway line was built with 85 stations, of which 31 were in Shandong province.

Rail traffic had to be ferried across the Yangtze to Nanjing to connect with the railroads passing through that city until the Nanjing Yangtze River Bridge was built across the river in 1968. Currently, it is the main section of Beijing–Shanghai railway.

== See also ==
- Rail transport in the People's Republic of China
- List of railways in China
