= List of locomotives in China =

This is a list of current and retired locomotives in the People's Republic of China.

== Steam locomotives ==
The first steam locomotive in China is thought to be a 2 ft 6 in (762 mm) gauge 0-4-0T engine used on the Shanghai-Wusong railway. Towards the end of the 19th century concessions obtained from the Qing dynasty enabled foreign powers (Germany, Russia, France and Great Britain) to build railways in China, and they introduced a variety of foreign-built machines. Later Japan gained control over Manchuria as a result of the Treaty of Portsmouth following the Russo-Japanese War and created the South Manchuria Railway from their acquisitions – resulting in Japanese as well as American locomotives being imported into the north-east of China.

After the end of the Second World War China came back under indigenous rule. Locomotives were imported from both the United States and Russia as well as other Communist bloc countries.

Production of steam locomotives continued into the late 20th century. However, steam motive power was supplanted by diesel and electric locomotives as early as the 1950s. The Chinese rail network has been increasingly electrified in the twentieth century.

=== Broad gauge ===
Model	Wheel arr.	Build year	Builder	Number built	Original operator	Original class	Photo	Notes
X	2-8-0	1898	Baldwin	121	Chinese Eastern Railway	Chinese Eastern Railway Х class MNR ソリA class		Retired 1945 in China. No. 180 is the only preserved broad gauge steam locomotive in China.

=== Standard gauge ===
Model	Wheel arr.	Build year	Builder	Number built	Original operator	Original class	Photo	Notes
AM1	4-4-0	1907	ALCO	4	South Manchuria Railway	SMR Amei class		
AM2	4-4-0	1897	Baldwin	>6	Beijing–Harbin Railway	PMR Class 40		
AM3	4-4-0	1929	ALCO	26	Huning Railway	Huning Railway Class 400		
AM4	4-4-0	1908	North British					
DB1	2-6-4T	1907	ALCO	>65	South Manchuria Railway	SMR Dabui class		Retired 1984
DB2	2-6-4T	1934	Hitachi, Kisha Seizō	15	South Manchuria Railway	SMR Dabuni class		Retired 1955.
DB3	2-6-4T	1906	Baldwin	4	Jingsui Railway			Retired 1955.
DB4	2-6-4ST	1892	Dübs & Company		Peking−Mukden Railway	PMR Class 20		Retired 1955.
DB5	2-6-4T	1911	Kitson & Company					
DK1	2-10-0	1919	ALCO (26x), Shahekou (36x)	62	South Manchuria Railway	SMR Dekai class		Retired 1980s
DK2	2-10-0	1915	ALCO, Baldwin	60	Chinese Eastern Railway	CER class Е^{ф}, Е^{с}, Е^{л} SMR Class Dekani		44 to CER; 16 supplied from USSR to China after 1949.
DK3	2-10-0	1937	Shahekou, Kisha Seizō	7	Longhai Railway	Longhai Railway Class 600		Retired 1955.
DK4	2-10-0	1936	Kisha Seizō, Hitachi		Tongpu Railway	Tongpu Railway Class 350		Originally metre gauge, some converted to standard gauge in 1947. Retired 1955.
DK5	2-10-0	1958	UCM Reșița	40	Căile Ferate Române	CFR Class 150		Retired 1975.
ET1	0-8-0	1919	ALCO		South Manchuria Railway	SMR Etoi class		integrated into the ET6 in 1951
ET2 (Henschel)	0-8-0	1912	Henschel		Xiaoyong Railway			Retired 1955.
ET2 (Russian)	0-8-0	1901	Bryansk, Kharkov	33	Chinese Eastern Ry	CER Class О^{д}		33 to CER; at least 13 converted to standard gauge between 1935 and 1945 by the MNR, 13 of these became China Railways ET2 after 1949. Retired 1952 in China.
ET3	0-8-0		Japan		Jiaoji Railway			Retired 1955.
ET4	0-8-0	1905	Henschel		Jiaoji Railway			Retired 1955.
ET5	0-8-0	1936	North British					
ET6	0-8-0	1936~1938	North British		Yuehan Railway	Yuehan Railway Class 500		Retired 1955.
ET7	0-8-0T	1959	Fablok	90	China Railway	CR Class ET7		Similar to the Polish TKP T2D Silesia locomotives, for industrial use, not used on the main network
FD	2-10-2	1958	Voroshilovgrad	1054 (to China)	Soviet Railways	SZhD Class FD		Converted to standard gauge (1958–) from Soviet FD class locomotives
FN1	0-6-2T	1900	Borsig	>8	Jiaoji Railway	Jiaoji Railway Class 10		Forney locomotive
FN2	0-6-2T	1897	Baldwin	>7	Peking-Mukden Railway	PMR Class 40		Forney locomotive
GJ	0-6-0T	1958–1961	Chengdu, Taiyuan	122	China Railways	CR Class GJ		Shunters and industrial locomotives.
JF1	2-8-2	1918–1960	ALCO, Kawasaki, Kisha Seizō, Nippon Sharyō, Hitachi, Shahekou, Dalian Machine, Sifang, Qiqihar, Taiyuan	2083	South Manchuria Railway, Manchukuo National Railway, North China Transport, Central China Railway, China Railways	SMR Mikai & Mikako class MNR Mika & Mikana class NCTC Mikai class CCR Class KD100; CR Class JF1		
JF2	2-8-2	1924–1932	ALCO, Kawasaki, Kisha Seizō, Shahekou	41	South Manchuria Railway	SMR Mikani class		
JF3	2-8-2	1927–1930	Škoda	19	Qike Railway, Huhai Railway, Sitao Railway	MNR Mikasa class		
JF4	2-8-2	1935	Kawasaki (11x), Kisha Seizō (4x)	15	South Manchuria Railway	SMR Mikashi class		
JF5	2-8-2	1923–1928	Kawasaki		North China Transport	NCTC Mikako class		
JF6	2-8-2	1934–1959	Kawasaki, Hitachi, Shahekou, Kisha Seizō, Nippon Sharyō, Shenyang, Dalian Machine	~475	South Manchuria Railway, Manchukuo National Railway, North China Transport, China Railways	SMR Mikasa & Mikaro class MNR Mikaro class NCTC Mikaro class CR Class JF6		
JF7	2-8-2	1913–1924	North British/Tangshan	24	Peking−Mukden Railway	PMR Class 200		
JF8	2-8-2	1935	Škoda	>7	Huainan Railway	Huainan Railway Class 300		
JF9	2-8-2	1927–1946	Kisha Seizō, Hitachi, Nippon Sharyō	38	Central China Railway	CCR Mikasa class		
JF10	2-8-2	1935	ALCO, Baldwin, Lima	30	USATC	USATC Class S200		
JF11	2-8-2	1918–1937	ALCO, Baldwin	70	Jinpu Railway, Zhegan Railway	Jinpu Railway Class MK		
JF12	2-8-2	1922	ALCO	46	Jingsui Railway	Jingsui Railway Class 300		
JF13	2-8-2	1939	Škoda		North China Transport	NCTC Mikaha class		
JF15	2-8-2	1928–1929	ALCO	6	Jihai Railway			
JF16	2-8-2	1922	Kawasaki, Kisha Seizō	17	Jichang Jidun Railway, Central China Railway	JJR Class 500; JNR Class D50		
JF17	2-8-2	1931	Hudswell Clarke, Shahekou	>4	Jiaoji Railway	Jiaoji Railway Class 600		
JF18	2-8-2	1914	ALCo	>14	Manchukuo National Railway	MNR Mikai class		
JF21	2-8-2	1937	ALCo		Yuehan Railway			
JS	2-8-2	1957–1965, 1981–1988	Dalian, Qishuyan, Datong, 7.2 Works	1916	China Railways	CR Class JS		
KD1	2-8-0	1907–1908	ALCo	41	South Manchuria Railway, Manchukuo National Railway	SMR Sorii class MNR Sorina class		
KD2	2-8-0	1925	Tubize	8	?			Retired 1990.
KD2	2-8-0	1935–1936	SACM	?	Longhai Railway			Retired 1990.
KD3	2-8-0	1910	Beyer, Peacock & Company	40	South Manchuria Railway	SMR Sorisa class		Retired 1990.
KD4	2-8-0		? North British	18; 3	Huning Railway; Shenhai Railway			ROD 2-8-0, 18 bought by Huning Railway in 1919, 3 bought by Shenhai Railway in 1926. Retired 1990.
KD5	2-8-0	1913–1941	Kawasaki, Kisha Seizō, JNR Ogura Works	251	North China Transport (150x); Central China Railway (101x)	NCTC Soriko class CCR Soriro class		Standard gauge version of JNR Class 9600.
KD6	2-8-0	1942–1946	ALCO, Baldwin, Lima	40 (to China)	USATC	USATC Class S160		Postwar aid to China from UNRRA.
KD7	2-8-0	1946–1947	ALCO, Baldwin, Lima	160 (to China)				Postwar aid from UNRRA, same as Belgian Type 29.
KD8	2-8-0	1916-1920		22 (to China)	Kowloon–Canton Railway, Yuehan Railway			Retired 1990.
KD9	2-8-0	1919–1933	ALCO (18x), Baldwin (10x), Kawasaki (4x)	32				Retired 1990.
KD10	2-8-0	1905–1913	ALCO, Baldwin, Pennsylvania Railroad Altoona Works	30 (to China)	Pennsylvania Railroad	PRR Class H6sb		Bought second-hand by South Manchuria Railway and Manchukuo National Railway in 1939. Retired 1990.
KD11	2-8-0	1907	Baldwin	20	South Manchuria Railway	SMR Sorini class		Retired 1990.
KD12	2-8-0	1920	Baldwin	16	Peking−Mukden Railway			Retired 1976.
KD13	2-8-0	1935	Belgium	10				
KD14	2-8-0	1917	ALCO	17	Jinghan Railway			
KD15	2-8-0	1916-1919	ALCO	4				Retired 1975.
KD16	2-8-0	1926	Hitachi, Kawasaki	6				Retired 1955.
KD18	2-8-0		United States					Retired 1975.
KD19	2-8-0	1914-1920	Baldwin	21				Retired 1955.
KD20	2-8-0	1929						Retired 1955.
KD21	2-8-0	1935	United States					Retired 1955.
KD22	2-8-0	1912	ALCO	3				Retired 1955.
KD23	2-8-0	1906	ALCO	2	Boston & Maine			Bought from the factory by Mantetsu. Retired 1955.
KD24	2-8-0	1916	ALCO					Retired 1955.
KD25	2-8-0	1920	Tubize					Retired 1955.
KF	4-8-4	1935–1936	Vulcan Foundry	24	Yuehan Railway			
LD1	4-4-4T	1936	Kawasaki	2	South Manchuria Railway	SMR Dabusa class		
MG1	2-6-0	1908–1909	North British/Tangshan	10	Jingsui Railway			Retired 1990.
MG1	2-6-0	1909			Jinpu Railway			
MG1	2-6-0	1910		12x	Jinpu Railway			
MG2	2-6-0	1897–1899	Baldwin	12	Peking−Mukden Railway	PMR Class 60		Retired 1955.
MG3	2-6-0	1900–1903	Dübs/North British/Tangshan	33	Peking−Mukden Railway	PMR Class 90		Retired 1955.
MG3	2-6-0	1914–1916	North British/Tangshan	22	Peking−Mukden Railway			
MG4	2-6-0	1919–1920	North British/Tangshan	4	Peking−Mukden Railway			Retired 1975.
MG4	2-6-0	1923–1928	North British/Tangshan	7	Peking−Mukden Railway			Retired 1975.
MG5	2-6-0	1902–1905	Fives-Lille	37	Jinghan Railway			Retired 1990.
MG6	2-6-0	1901	Fives-Lille	>3	Jinghan Railway	Jinghan Railway Class 100		Retired 1990.
MG7	2-6-0	1910–1911	Hanomag (6x), Humboldt (14x)	20	Jinpu Railway	Jinpu Railway Class 30		Retired 1990.
MG8	2-6-0	1916–1919	Vulcan Iron Works	15	Longhai Railway			Retired 1990.
MG9	2-6-0	1901	Baldwin		Jinghan Railway	Jinghan Railway Class 90		Retired 1975.
MG10	2-6-0	1909	North British		Kowloon–Canton Railway	CKR Class A		Retired 1975.
MG11	2-6-0	1931	Orenstein & Koppel					Retired 1975.
MG12	2-6-0							Retired 1975.
MG13	2-6-0	1900–1903	Rogers	6	Jinghan Railway			
MG13	2-6-0							Retired 1955.
MG15	2-6-0							Retired 1955.
MG16	2-6-0	1903-1907						Retired 1955.
MG17	2-6-0	1908						Retired 1955.
MG18	2-6-0							Retired 1955.
MG19	2-6-0							Retired 1955.
MG20	2-6-0							Retired 1955.
MG21	2-6-0	1927	Baldwin		Xinning Railway			
MG22	2-6-0							Retired 1955.
MG23	2-6-0							
MG24	2-6-0							
MG25	2-6-0							Retired 1955.
MG26	2-6-0	1913–1918	ALCO	2	Daoqing Railway			
MG27	2-6-0	1921						Retired 1955.
MG28	2-6-0							Retired 1955.
MG29	2-6-0	1907	ALCO					Retired 1955.
MG30	2-6-0							Retired 1955.
MG31	2-6-0							Retired 1955.
MG32	2-6-0							Retired 1955.
MG33	2-6-0	1921	North British/Tangshan	1	Shenhai Railway	Shenhai Railway 51		
MG33	2-6-0	1927	Baldwin	4	Shenhai Railway	Shenhai Railway 52–55		Retired 1955.
MG33	2-6-0	1911	North British/Tangshan	6	Jichang Railway	Jichang Class 100		
ML1	2-6-0	1908	North British	4	Jingsui Railway	Jingsui Railway Class 20		Retired 1955.
ML2	2-4-4-2	1911	Baldwin	4	Jingsui Railway	Jingsui Railway Class 70		Retired 1975.
ML3	2-8-8-2	1914	ALCO	7	Jingsui Railway	Jingsui Railway Class 90		Retired 1955.
ML4	2-8-8-2	1921	ALCo	7	Jingsui Railway	Jingsui Railway Class 200		Retired 1955.
MT1	4-8-2	1936	Kawasaki, Hitachi	7	South Manchuria Railway	SMR Matei class		
MT2	4-8-2		Baldwin		Yuehan Railway			
PL1	2-6-2	1908	ALCO	35	South Manchuria Railway	SMR Purei class		Retired 1984.
PL2	2-6-2	1935	Nippon Sharyō	20	South Manchuria Railway	SMR Pureni class		
PL3	2-6-2T	1928		18	South Manchuria Railway	SMR Puresa class		Same as Sentetsu Purena class. Retired 1987.
PL4	2-6-2	1919	Baldwin	1	Jinghan Railway			
PL4	2-6-2	1913–1922	North British/Tangshan	3	Peking−Mukden Railway			
PL5	2-6-2 (6x); 2-6-2T (10x)	1887–1914	Dübs/North British	16	Peking−Mukden Railway			
PL5	2-6-2ST		North British	2	Jingsui Railway			
PL6	2-6-2T	1891–1896; 1915–1925	North British ?	17; 12				Retired 1955.
PL7	2-6-2	1921	Baldwin		Jingsui Railway			Retired 1955.
PL8	2-6-2ST	1911	Baldwin		Jingsui Railway			Retired 1955.
PL9	2-6-2	1920–1923	Société Franco-Belge	40	Jinghan Railway			PL9-146 on display at the China Railway Museum is the only Belgian-made locomotive to survive in China. Retired 1988.
PL9	2-6-2	1936	Škoda	>2	Jinghan Railway	Jinghan Railway Class 20		
PL9	2-6-2	1920–1922	Lima	10				
PL10	2-6-2	1914	Tubize	5	Longhai Railway	Longhai Railway Class 50		Retired 1955.
PL11	2-6-2	1909	Baldwin		Jingsui Railway			Retired 1955.
PL12	2-6-2T	1923–1927	North British/Tangshan		Peking−Mukden Railway			Retired 1955.
PL13	2-6-2	1914	Baldwin	>4	Peking−Mukden Railway	PMR Class 150		Retired 1955.
PL14	2-6-2T	1891–1896	North British		Peking−Mukden Railway			Retired 1955.
PL20	2-6-2T	1914	Hanomag	>3	Jinpu Railway	Jinpu Railway Class 200		Retired 1955.
PL21	2-6-2	1940	Orenstein & Koppel					At Harbin in 1950s. Retired 1955.
QJ	2-10-2	1956–1988	Dalian, Tangshan, Shenyang, Mudanjiang, Changchun, Datong	4708	China Railways	CR Class HP		
RA	2+2+2	1909–1912	Lima	6	Jingsui Railway	Jingsui Railway Class 25		3-truck (Class C) Shay locomotive.
RM	4-6-2	1958–1966	Sifang	258	China Railways	CR Class RM		
SL1	4-6-2	1914-1922	ALCO	20	Jingsui Railway			Retired 1990.
SL2	4-6-2	1916, 1921	Shahekou	6	South Manchuria Railway	SMR Pashini class		
SL3	4-6-2	1934–1940	Hitachi, Kisha Seizō	96	South Manchuria Railway; Manchukuo National Railway; North China Transport	SMR Pashisa class MNR Pashishi class NCTC Pashisa class		88 to China Railways, 8 to Korean State Railway
SL4	4-6-2	1919; 1921	Baldwin; Shahekou	6; 23	South Manchuria Railway	SMR Pashisa & Pashiha class SMR Pashishi class		
SL5	4-6-2	1927–1928	Shahekou	11	South Manchuria Railway	SMR Pashiko class		
SL6	4-6-2	1933–1958	Kawasaki, Kisha Seizō, Hitachi, Shahekou, Nippon Sharyō, Sifang	422	South Manchuria Railway; Manchukuo Nat'l Ry; North China Transport; Central China Railway	SMR Pashiro class MNR Pashiku class NCTC Pashiro class CCR Class KC100		
SL7	4-6-2	1934, 1936	Kawasaki, Shahekou	12	South Manchuria Railway	SMR Pashina class		
SL8	4-6-2	1937–1940	Hitachi, Shahekou	17	South Manchuria Railway; Manchukuo National Railway	SMR/MNR Pashiha class		
SL9	4-6-2	1939 (regauged)	JNR Hamamatsu, Kisha Seizō	16 (to China)	Central China Railway	CCR Class C51		Japanese class C51 converted to standard gauge in 1939. Retired 1990.
SL10	4-6-2	1921–1925	Baldwin	10	Peking−Mukden Railway			
SL11	4-6-2	1908	ALCO	7	South Manchuria Railway	SMR Pashii class		
SL12	4-6-2	1942–1943	Kawasaki	10	Central China Railway	CCR Pashishi class		Same as Sentetsu Pashishi class
SL13	4-6-2	1937	Cockerill	18	Longhai Railway	Longhai Railway Class 500		Retired 1990.
SL14	4-6-2	1933	North British	8	Jinpu Railway			Retired 1990.
SL15	4-6-2	1921	ALCO	12	Jinpu Railway			Retired 1990.
SL16	4-6-2	1930	North British	4	Jinghu Railway	Jinghu Railway Class G50		Retired 1975.
SL17	4-6-2	1929	Shahekou	4	Sitao			Retired 1955.
SL20	4-6-2	1921–1924	ALCO, Kisha Seizō	10	Shantung Railway	Shantung Railway Class 400		Retired 1975.
ST1	2-10-2T	1929; 1930	Škoda (6x); Kawasaki (1x)	7	Chinese Eastern Railway	CER Class Ь 4001–4007		Converted to standard gauge around 1940.
ST2	2-10-2	1935	Krupp		Jinpu Railway			Similar to DRG Class 45.
ST3	2-10-2	1937	Tubize	1	Longhai Railway			
SY	2-8-2	1960–1999	Tangshan	1820	China Railways	CR Class SY		Last steam locomotives manufactured for revenue service in the world.
TH1	4-6-0	1908; 1912	ALCO	17; 5	South Manchuria Railway	SMR Tehoi class SMR Tehoni class		Image is of 1908 variant.
TH2	4-6-0	1910–1911; 1901–1905	Vulcan Stettin	6; 17	Jiaoji Railway	Jiaoji Railway Class 70; Jiaoji Railway Class ?		
TH3	4-6-0	1910–1919	North British/Tangshan	10	Peking−Mukden Railway	PMR Class 110		Rebuilt with superheaters in late 1930s; retired 1955.
TH4	4-6-0	1913	Schwartzkopff	5	Jiaoji Railway	Jiaoji Railway Class 300		Retired 1955.
TH5	4-6-0	1910–1913	Henschel, Hanomag					Retired 1975.
TH6	4-6-0	1913	Tubize?	10	Jinghan Railway			
TH7	4-6-0	1904–1907	France	32	Jinghan Railway	Jinghan Railway Class 200		
TH7	4-6-0	1909	France	10	Longhai Railway			
TH8	4-6-0		United States					
TH9	4-6-0	1910	Hawthorn Leslie	12	Jinpu Railway			Retired 1955.
TH10	4-6-0	1906	ALCO	4	Chicago Southern RR			
TH11	4-6-0	1902–1903	Bryansk (40x), Kharkov (45x)	85 (for CER)	Chinese Eastern Railway	CER class Г, Г^{ч}		Some rebuilt with superheaters (Г^{ч}); 24 converted to standard gauge in late 1930s – these became CR TH11. Retired 1955.
TH13	4-6-0	1931	Kitson & Company		Kowloon–Canton Railway			Retired 1955.
TW1	4-8-0	1933	Hunslet	8	Hangchow-Kiangshan Railway	Hangkiang Ry 401–408		
XH	0-8-0	1960–1961	Changchun, Mudanjiang	48	China Railways	CR Class XH		
XK1	0-8-0	1898	Baldwin; Kolomna	27 ?	Chinese Eastern Railway	CER Class Ь^{а} CER Class Ь^{к}		
XK2	0-6-0T	1942–1944	Davenport, H.K. Porter, Vulcan (USA)	20 (to China)	USATC	USATC Class S100		Supplied to Zhegan Railway as aid. Retired 1988.
XK3	0-6-0	1883–1899	Swindon Works	22–26 (to China)		GWR 2301 Class		
XK5	0-6-0T	1901	Cockerill		Jinghan Railway	Jinghan Railway Class 60		Retired 1955.
XK6	0-6-0T	~1880	Belgium					Same as Belgian Type 51.
XK7	0-6-0							
XK9	0-6-0T		France		Zhengtai Railway	Zhengtai Railway Class 10		Retired 1955.
XK13	0-6-0T	1958–1960	Fablok				XK13-3858	Fablok TKh49 Retired 1984.
YJ	2-6-2	1958–1961	Jinan (120x), Tangshan (80x)	200	China Railways	CR Class YJ		

=== Narrow gauge ===
Model	Wheel arr.	Build year	Builder	Number built	Original operator	Original class	Photo	Notes
C2	0-8-0	1952–1988	Shijiazhuang, Mudanjiang, Harbin, Dunhua		China Railways	CR Class C2		762 mm. Copy of Russian class Pt-4.
DK51	2-10-0	1936	Hitachi		Tongpu Ry	Tongpu Ry Class 350		Some converted to standard gauge (DK4)
DK51	2-10-0	1937	Henschel		Tongpu Ry	Tongpu Ry Class 300		Retired 1990.
FN51	0-6-2T	1906	Fives-Lille	30	Zhengtai Ry	Zhengtai Ry Class 100		Forney locomotive.
JF51	2-8-2ST	1913–1926	France	28	Yunnan Ry			1000 mm. Retired 1990.
KD51	2-8-0	1937–1938 (regauged)	ALCo	26 (for China)	North China Transport	NCTC SoriA class		JNR class 9050 converted to metre gauge. Retired 1975.
KD52	2-8-0	1939	SLM		Yunnan Ry	Yunnan Ry		Retired 1975.
KD55	2-8-0	1921	Kawasaki	54	Yunnan Ry			1000 mm version of class KD5.
MG51	2-6-0	1934–1935	Henschel	>2	Tongpu Ry	Tongpu Ry Class 110		
MG52	2-6-0	1908	ALCo	1	Tongpu Ry	Tongpu Ry Class 100		
PL51	2-6-2T	1938–1939 (regauged)	Kawasaki		North China Transport	NCTC PureA class		JNR class C12 converted to metre gauge; some sent to Vietnam in 1956.
PL52	2-6-2	1923, 1927	Kawasaki					
RJ	0-8-0	1959–1965	Chengdu	70	China Railways	CR Class RJ		
SN	0-10-0	1924–1929	Baldwin	16	Gebishi Railway			600 mm. Retired 1990.
TH55	4-6-0		France		Yunnan Ry			
XK51 (1)	0-6-0		Barclay		Tongpu Ry			
XK51 (2)	0-6-0		Vulcan		Tongpu Ry			
YC	2-6-2	1965–1970	Dalian	67	China Railways	CR Class YC		Developed for Vietnam Railways

== Diesel locomotives ==
=== Diesel-hydraulic transmission ===
Diesel-hydraulic locomotives type descriptions are prefixed either by the roman initials DFH (Diesel fuel, hydraulic) or NY (neiran yeli chuandong 内燃液力传动 meaning internal combustion – hydraulic transmission). From the initials of the acronym DFH is derived from their phonetic sound the Chinese name "Dongfang Hong" meaning "Red East", matching the anthem of Communist China: "The East is Red" at the time of their introduction, as well as the well known observation of Chairman Mao Zedong that 'the east is red'. Usually DFH is used for internally produced locomotives and NY for imported or prototype machines.

==== Chinese made ====
Model	Build year	Top speed (In maximum) (km/h)	Power output (kW)	Builder	Total production	Photo
prototype NY1 "Weixing"	1959	140	1060	Sifang	4	
DFH1	1964–1973	120(140)	1220(1060)	Sifang	102	
prototype NY2 "Flying Dragon", (Chinese: 飞龙)	1960	100	1470 (Diesel engine output)	Dalian	1	
DFH2	1971–1975	62	650	Ziyang	50	
DFH3	1971–1989	120	1440	Sifang	268	
DFH4	1969	160	3675	Sifang	1	
DFH4	1971–1974	140	3309	Qishuyan	2	
DFH4	1975–1981	100	3309	Ziyang	3	
DFH5	1976–1988	80	790	Ziyang; Sifang	480~	
DFH5B (3000系)	1973–1988	80	920	Ziyang	~20	
DFH5C (4000系)	1973–1988	80	920	Ziyang	6	
DFH6	1981	90	1470	Ziyang	1	
DFH7	1988–1991	80	790	Ziyang	15	
DFH21 (narrow gauge)	1977–1984	50	810	Sifang	104	
Beijing 6001	1970	100	4412 (Diesel engine output)	Beijing Feb. 7th	1	
Beijing	1971–1990	120	2206	Beijing Feb. 7th	361	
Beijing (coupling of double loco)	1986–1990	120	2×2206	Beijing Feb. 7th	2×6	

==== Imported ====
Model	Build year	Top speed (In maximum) (km/h)	Power output (kW)	Builder	Total production	Photo
NY5	1967	passenger: 160 freight: 120	2940	Henschel, West Germany	4	
NY6	1972	108	3160	Henschel, West Germany	10	
NY7	1972	113	3680	Henschel, West Germany	20	

=== Diesel-electric transmission ===
==== Chinese made ====
The Dongfeng (DF) (Chinese: 东风) series of diesel-electric locomotives is the most important in Chinese rail transport. The Dongfeng 4 (DF4) is by far the most common locomotive to be seen on Chinese rails.

Model (Former name)	Build year	Transmission	Top speed (In maximum) (km/h)	Power output (kW)	Builder (Family)	Total production	Photo
JianShe (Chinese: 建设)	1958	DC – DC	85	441 (Diesel engine output)	Beijing Feb. 7th	1	
XianXing (Chinese: 先行)	1958–1959	DC – DC	125	1471	Qishuyan	47	
JuLong (Chinese: 巨龙)	1958				Dalian	1	
DF (Chinese: 东风)	1964–1974	DC – DC	100	1500	Dalian; Qishuyan; Chengdu; Datong	706	
DF2 (ND2)	1964–1974	DC – DC	95	650	Qishuyan	148	
DF3	1972–1974	DC – DC	120	1050	Dalian	226	
DF4	1969–1985	AC – DC	100(freight); 120(passenger)	1920	Dalian	843	
DF4B	1985–present	AC – DC	100(freight); 120(passenger)	1985	Dalian; Ziyang; Datong; Sifang	≥4500	
DF4C	1985–1999	AC – DC	100	2165	Dalian; Ziyang; Datong; Sifang	838	
DF4CK	1999	AC – DC	160	2165	Ziyang	2	
DF4D(K) (speedup version)	1996－1999	AC – DC	145	2425	Dalian	580	
DF4D(H) _{(freight version)}	1998－present	AC – DC	100	2425	Dalian	206	
DF4D(Z) _{(sub-highspeed version)}	1999－2007	AC – DC	170	2425	Dalian	333	
DF4D(7000 Series) (Radial bogie freight type)	2000–2003	AC – DC	100	2425	Dalian	21	
DF4DJ (DF4DAC)	2000	AC – DC – AC	145	2510	Dalian; Siemens, Germany	2	
DF4DF	1999–2004	AC – DC	120	2425	Dalian	31	
DF4DD (road switcher version)	1999–2004	AC – DC	80	3180	Dalian	230	
DF4E	1995–1997	AC – DC	100	4860 (2×2430)	Sifang	16	
DF5	1976–2006	AC – DC	80	1213	Tangshan; Sifang	1014	
DF5G	2001–2006	AC – DC	100	1213	Sifang	132	
DF5B	1976–2006	AC – DC	100	1500	Dalian	36	
DF5BG	1976–2006	AC – DC	100	1500	Dalian	?	
DF5C	1994–1998; 1998–2006	AC – DC	100	1320; 2000 (Diesel engine output)	Sifang	?	
DF5D	1999–2006	AC – DC	80	1200	Dalian	180	
DF6	1989	AC – DC	118	2425	Dalian; GE, United States	4	
DF7	1982–1990	AC – DC	100	1470	Beijing Feb. 7th	295	
DF7B	1990–1998	AC – DC	100	1840	Beijing Feb. 7th	215	
DF7C	1991–2001	AC – DC	100	1840/1470	Beijing Feb. 7th	289	
DF7D	1995–1998	AC – DC	100	1500 (Diesel engine output)	Beijing Feb. 7th	214	
DF7E	1998	AC – DC	100	2000 (Diesel engine output)	Beijing Feb. 7th	2	
DF7F	2000	AC – DC	100	2650 (Diesel engine output)	Beijing Feb. 7th	?	
DF7G	2003–present	AC – DC	100	2200 (Diesel engine output)	Beijing Feb. 7th Sifang; Qishuyan	347	
DF7J	2004	AC – DC – AC	100	2200 (Diesel engine output)	Beijing Feb. 7th	1	
DF8	1984–1990	AC – DC	100	3310	Qishuyan	141	
DF8B	1997–present	AC – DC	100	3100	Qishuyan; Ziyang	1013	
DF8BJ "West Light" (Chinese: 西部之光)	2002	AC – DC – AC	120	4000	Ziyang	1	
DF8CJ "Sunlight" (Chinese: 霞光)	2002	AC – DC – AC	120	3650	Qishuyan	3	
DF8DJ (DF8B 5672)	2003	AC – DC – AC	120	3350	Ziyang	1	
DF9	1991	AC – DC	170	3040	Qishuyan	2	
DF10	1988	AC – DC	100	2×1600	Dalian	1	
DF10D	1992	AC – DC	120	2×1600	Dalian	1	
DF10DD	2003–present	AC – DC	100	2200 (Diesel engine output)	Dalian	262	
DF10F	1996–1998	AC – DC	160	2×2200 (Diesel engine output)	Dalian	6	
DF11	1992–2005	AC – DC	170	3040	Qishuyan	460	
DF11G	2003－present	AC – DC	170	6080 (2×3040)	Qishuyan	79	
DF11Z	2002	AC – DC	160	6080 (2×3040)	Qishuyan	6	
DF12	1997–2001	AC – DC	100	1990	Ziyang	?	
DF21 (narrow gauge)	?	AC – DC	60	1500 (Diesel engine output)	Sifang	11	
NJ1	1999	AC – DC – AC	80	1320 (Diesel engine output)	Sifang	3	
HXN3B "Harmony"	2012–present	AC – DC – AC	100	3500	EMD, United States; Dalian	≥160	
HXN3K "Harmony"	2016–present	AC – DC – AC	160		Dalian		
HXN5B "Harmony"	2012–present	AC – DC – AC	100	3530	Qishuyan	≥160	
HXN5K "Harmony"	2016–present	AC – DC – AC	160		Qishuyan		
HXN6 "Harmony"	2016–present	AC – DC – AC			Ziyang		
FXN3B	2018–present	AC – DC – AC	100	2500	Dalian, Qishuyan		
FXN3C	2018–present	AC – DC – AC	120	3500	Dalian		
FXN5C	2019–present	AC – DC – AC	120	3530	Qishuyan		

==== Imported ====
Model	Build year	Transmission	Top speed (maximum) (km/h)	Power output (kW)	Builder (Family)	Total production	Photo
ND1	1958;1965	DC – DC	80	440	Ganz, Hungary (Hungarian State Railways Class M44)	26	
ND2	1972–1987	DC – DC	120	1280	Electroputere, Romania Craiova (CFR 060DA)	284	
ND3	1985	DC – DC	100	1540	Electroputere, Romania Craiova	88	
ND4	1973–1975	AC – DC	100	2150	Alstom, France	50	
ND5	1984－1986	AC – DC	118	2550	GE, United States (GE C36-7)	422	
NJ2	2005–2006	AC – DC – AC	120	3800	GE, United States	78	
HXN3 "Harmony"	2008–2014	AC – DC – AC	120	4700	EMD, United States; Dalian	332	
HXN5 "Harmony"	2008–2010	AC – DC – AC	120	4660	GE, United States; Qishuyan	700	

== Electric locomotives ==
=== AC/DC transmission ===
==== Shaoshan (SS) (Chinese: 韶山) series ====
Model	Build year	Top speed (maximum) (km/h)	Power output (kW)	Builder	Total production	Photo
SS1 (6Y1)	1958–1988	90	3780	Zhuzhou	826	
SS2	1969	100	4440	Zhuzhou	1	
SS3	1978–1993	100	4320	Zhuzhou; Ziyang; Datong	677	
SS3 (4000)	1992–2006	100	4320	Zhuzhou; Ziyang; Datong; Taiyuan	733	
SS3B (coupling of double loco)	2002–2009	100	2×4320	Zhuzhou; Ziyang; Datong	333	
SS3C	2008	100	2×4800	Taiyuan	1	
SS4	1985–2003	100	2×3200	Zhuzhou	158	
SS4G	1993–2007	100	2×3200	Zhuzhou; Ziyang; Dalian; Datong	1347	
SS4B	1995–2006	100	2×3200	Zhuzhou	130	
SS4C	1997	100	2×3200	Zhuzhou	2	
SS5	1990	140	3200	Zhuzhou	2	
SS6	1991	100	4800	Zhuzhou	53	
SS6B	1992—2002	100	4800	Zhuzhou	201	
SS7	1992–2007	100	4800	Datong	113	
SS7B	1997	100	4800	Datong	2	
SS7C	1998–2006	120	4800	Datong	171	
SS7D	1999–2002	170	4800	Datong	59	
SS7E	2001–2006	170	4800	Datong; Dalian	146	
SS8	1994–2001	170	3600	Zhuzhou	245	
SS9	1998–2002	170	4800	Zhuzhou	43	
SS9G	2002–2006	170	4800	Zhuzhou	171	

==== Imported ====
Model	Build year	Top speed (maximum) (km/h)	Power output (kW)	Builder (Family)	Total production	Photo
6Y2	1958–1961	101	4740	Alstom, France (SNCF Class CC 7100)	25	
6G1	1971	120	5100	Romania (CFR Class 40)	2	
6G	1973	112	5400	Alstom, France	40	
6K	1986–1987	100	4800	Kawasaki Heavy Industries, Japan (JNR Class EF66, JNR Class ED75)	85	
8G	1987–1990	100	2×3200	Novocherkassk Electric Locomotive Plant, USSR (ВЛ80)	100	
8K	1987	100	2×3200	50 Hz-Group: Alstom, Siemens, BBC and others	150	

=== AC/DC-AC transmission ===
Both post 2000 introductions of asynchronous AC motor driven locomotives and high speed trains based on technology transfer arrangements with other countries have been given the common name "Harmony" series. Ministry of Railways deputy chief engineer Zhang Shuguang explained that the name was to represent energy efficiency and good environmental credentials as well as indicating smooth running of complicated systems. Vehicles of the 'Harmony' series have an "H" in their type descriptions.

Model	Build year	Top speed (In maximum) (km/h)	Power output (kW)	Builder (Family)	Total production	Photo
AC4000	1996	120	4000	Zhuzhou	1	
DJ "Jiufang" (Chinese: 九方)	2000	200	4800	Zhuzhou	2	
DJ1	2000–2001	120	6400	Siemens; Zhuzhou	20	
DJ2 "Olympic Stars" (Chinese: 奥星)	2001	200	4800	Zhuzhou	3	
Tiansuo or "Sky Shuttle" (Chinese: 天梭)	2003	200	4800	Datong	1	
HXD1 (DJ4)	2006–2010	120	9600 (2×4800)	Siemens; Zhuzhou	220	
HXD1.1	2006–present	120	9600 (2×4800)	Zhuzhou	≥600	
HXD1.6	2006–present	120	9600 (2×4800)	Ziyang	≥80	
HXD1.7	2006–2012	120	9600 (2x4800)	Zhuzhou	190	
HXD1.7 "Shenhua"	2006–2012	120	9600 (2×4800) / 14400 (3×4800)	Zhuzhou	8/2	
HXD1.7 "Shen 24"	2020	120	28800 (6x4800)	Zhuzhou	20	
HXD1B	2009–2011	120	9600	Siemens, Germany; Zhuzhou	650	
HXD1C	2009–present	120	7200	Siemens, Germany; Zhuzhou; Ziyang	1207	
HXD1D	2012–present	160	7200	Zhuzhou	≥600	
HXD1F	2014	100	9600 (2×4800)	Zhuzhou	2	
HXD1G	2015–present	210	11200(2×5600)	Zhuzhou	2	
HXD2 (DJ4-6000)	2006–2008	120	10000 (2×5000)	Alstom, France; Datong	180	
HXD2.1	2012–present	120	10000 (2×5000)	Bombardier; Datong	≥280	
HXD2.6	2014–present	120	10000 (2×5000)	Dalian	40	
HXD2.7	2012–present	120	10000 (2×5000)	Bombardier; Datong	50	
HXD2B	2009–2011	120	9600	Alstom; Datong	500	
HXD2C	2010–2011	120	7200	Datong	≥220	
HXD2D	2013–present	160	7200	Datong	1	
HXD2F	2014	100	9600 (2×4800)	Datong	2	
FXD2F	2024–present	100	9600 (2×4800)	Datong	1	
HXD2G	2015–present	200	12800 (2×6400)	Datong	1	
HXD3 (SSJ3, DJ3, SL1)	2003–2010	120	7200	Toshiba; Dalian; Datong; Beijing Feb. 7th	1080	
HXD3A	2014	120	9600 (2×4800)	Bombardier; Dalian	2	
HXD3B	2009–2011	120	9600	Bombardier; Dalian	500	
HXD3C	2010–present	120	7200	Bombardier; Dalian	≥1300	
HXD3D	2012–present	160	7200	Dalian	≥600	
HXD3G	2015–present	210	12800 (2×6400)	Dalian	1	
FXD3C	2024–present	120		Dalian	1	
FXD1H	2023–present	100		Zhuzhou	1	
FXD3H	2023–present	100		Dalian	1	
FXSY3	2024–present	120	7200 (electric) / 3000 (diesel)	Dalian	1	

== Push-pull trainset power cars with locomotive classification ==
Model	Type	Build year	Top speed (km/h)	Power output (kW)	Builder	Photo
FXD1-J	Electric	2017–present	160	5600	Zhuzhou, Datong	
FXD3-J	Electric	2017–present	160	5600	Dalian	
HXD1D-J	Electric	2021	160	7200	Zhuzhou	
FXN3-J	Diesel	2021	160	2×3200	Dalian	
FXN3A-J	Diesel-battery	2024–present	160	3800	Dalian	
FXD1D-J	Electric	2024–present	200	7200		
FXD3D-J	Electric	2024–present	200	7200		

== Bibliography ==
- Gibbons, Robin (2016). Locomotives of China - The JF6 Family - The JF6, PL2, YJ and SY Classes. United Kingdom: Tynedale Publishing. ISBN 978-0-9934192-1-8.
- Miller, Max (2017). Along the Valley Line: The History of the Connecticut Valley Railroad. Wesleyan University. ISBN 978-0-8195-7737-5.
- Gibbons, Robin (2015). Locomotives of China - The JF1 and JS Classes: History and Allocation of the Chinese JF1 and JS Class Steam Locomotives. Tynedale Publishing. ISBN 978-0993419201.
- Gibbons, Robin (2017). Locomotives of China - The QJ Class. Tynedale Publishing. ISBN 978-0993419225.
