= China Railways SS7B =

Chinese electric locomotive class

SS7B 韶山7B
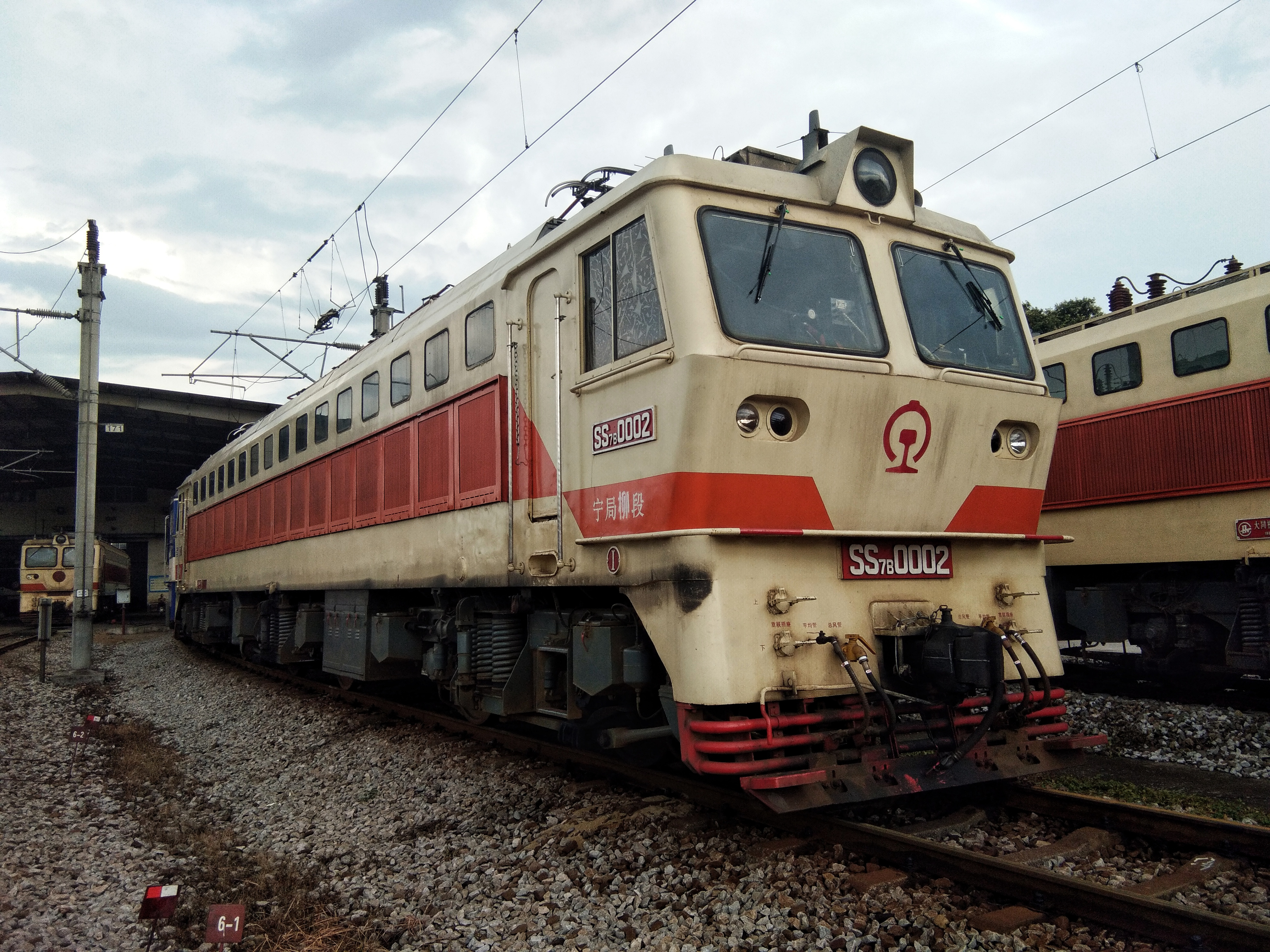
- SS7B-0002, Liuzhou, May 2018
Type and origin
- Power type: Electric
- Builder: Datong Electric Locomotive Works
- Model: SS_{7B}
- Build date: 1997
- Total produced: 2
Specifications
- Configuration
  - UIC: Bo'Bo'Bo'
- Gauge: 1,435 mm (4 ft 8 1/2 in)
- Wheelbase: 17,280 mm (56 ft 8 in)
- Length: 20,800 mm (68 ft 3 in)(length of locomotive chassis); 22,016 mm (72 ft 2.8 in) (between coupler centers)
- Width: 3,105 mm (10 ft 2.2 in)
- Height: 4,120 mm (13 ft 6 in)
- Axle load: 25 t (24.6 long tons; 27.6 short tons)
- Electric system/s: 25 kV AC Catenary
- Current pickup(s): Pantograph
- Transmission: AC – DC
Performance figures
- Maximum speed: 100 km/h (62 mph)
- Power output: 4,800 kW (6,400 hp)
- Tractive effort: 485 kN (109,000 lb_{f}) (starting); 385 kN (87,000 lb_{f}) (continuous)

The Shaoshan 7B (Chinese: 韶山7B) is a type of electric locomotive used by China's national railway system China Railways. This locomotive was one of China's 25-ton axle load test locomotives in the 1990s.

== History ==
According to the design task book issued by the Ministry of Railways in 1996, Datong Electric Locomotive Works developed SS7B Electric Locomotive. However, there were only two SS7Bs manufactured.

At first, two SS7Bs belong to Kunming Locomotive Depot, Kunming Railway Bureau, later two SS7Bs were transferred to Nanning Locomotive Depot, Nanning Railway Bureau. In 2005, SS7B-0001 was destroyed in an accident which happened in Nanning-Kunming Railway.

SS7B-0002 was transferred to Liuzhou Locomotive Depot in the spring of 2018.

== Design ==
SS7B is a 25-ton axle heavy freight electric locomotive which based on the SS7 Electric Locomotive. Two SS7Bs' each axis axle load 25 tons.

== See also ==
- List of locomotives in China
- China Railways SS7
- China Railways SS4C
- China Railways DF7E
- China Railways DF8B
