= SS6 =

SS6 may refer to:

- SS-6 Sapwood, the world's first intercontinental ballistic missile
- Signaling System No. 6
- USS Pike (SS-6), a submarine of the United States Navy
- Super Show 6, the sixth international tour by South Korean boy band Super Junior
- China Railways SS6, a Zhuzhou-built electric locomotive
