= SS7 =

SS7 or SS-7 may refer to:

- China Railways SS7, an electric locomotive model in China
- Signalling System No. 7, a set of telephony signalling protocols
- SS-7 Saddler, the NATO reporting name of R-16 missile
- Strada statale 7 Via Appia, an Italian state highway
- Super Socket 7, a chip socket introduced by AMD
