= China Railways SS6 =

Chinese electric locomotive class

SS6 韶山6
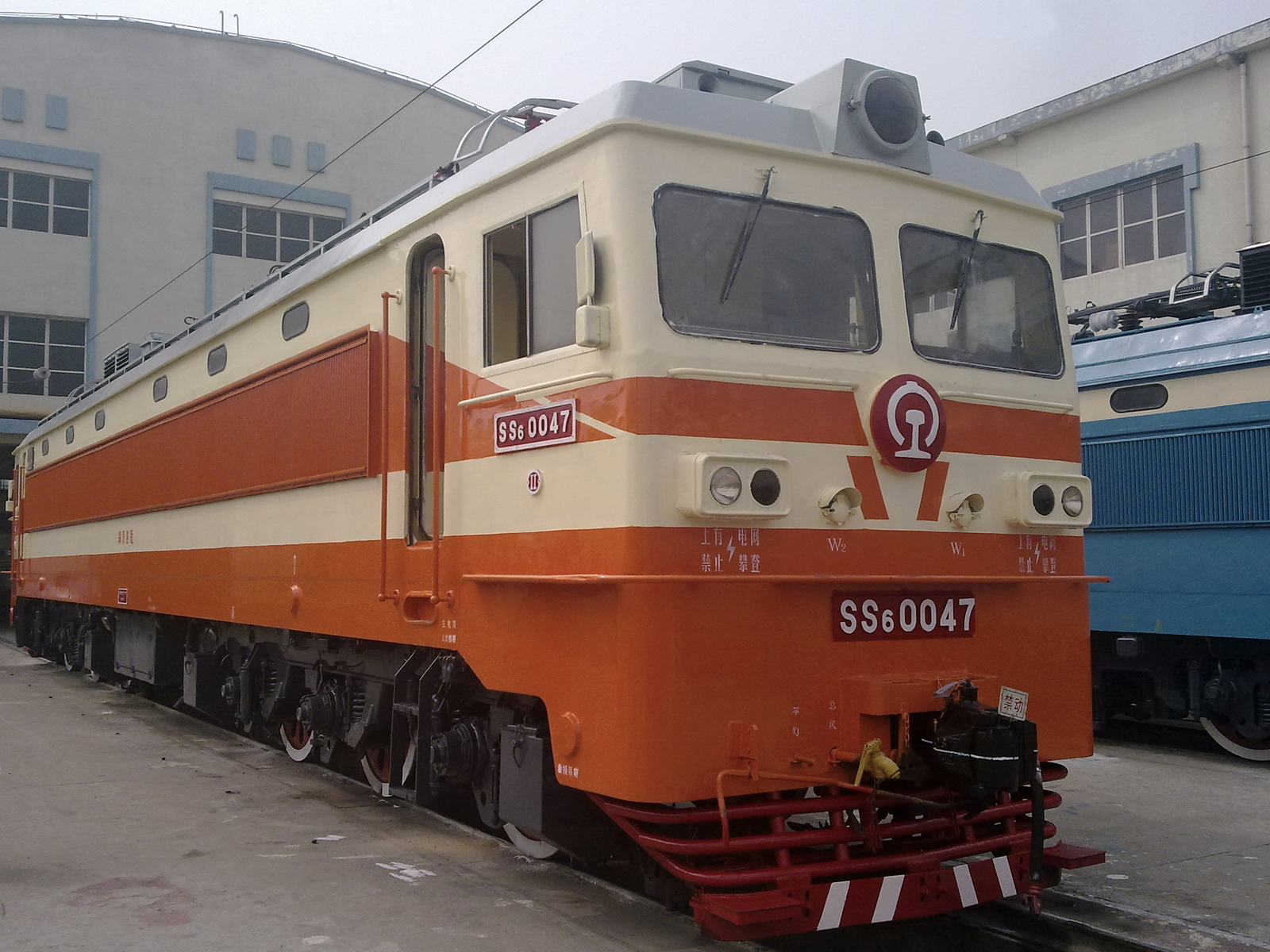
- SS6-0047
Type and origin
- Power type: Electric
- Builder: Zhuzhou Electric Locomotive Works
- Model: SS_{6}
- Build date: 1991
- Total produced: 53
Specifications
- Configuration
  - UIC: Co′Co′
- Gauge: 1,435 mm (4 ft 8 1/2 in)
- Wheelbase: 4,300 mm (14 ft 1 in)
- Length: 21,416 mm (70 ft 3.1 in) (between coupler centers)
- Width: 3,100 mm (10 ft 2 in)
- Height: 4,700 mm (15 ft 5 in) ± 50 mm (2.0 in)
- Axle load: 23 t (22.6 long tons; 25.4 short tons)
- Electric system/s: 25 kV AC Catenary
- Current pickup: Pantograph
- Transmission: AC - DC
Performance figures
- Maximum speed: 100 km/h (62 mph)
- Power output: 4,800 kW (6,400 hp)
- Tractive effort: 485 kN (109,000 lb_{f}) (starting); 351 kN (79,000 lb_{f}) (continuous)

The Shaoshan 6 (Chinese: 韶山6) is a type of electric locomotive used on the People's Republic of China's national railway system. This locomotive was the sixth Chinese electric main line locomotive, built by the Zhuzhou Electric Locomotive Works.

The overall arrangement of SS6 is similar to SS3. The main circuit of SS6 is influenced by the 6K, an electric locomotive model imported from Japan. The power supply was industrial-frequency single-phase AC, and the axle arrangement Co-Co.

== Preservation ==
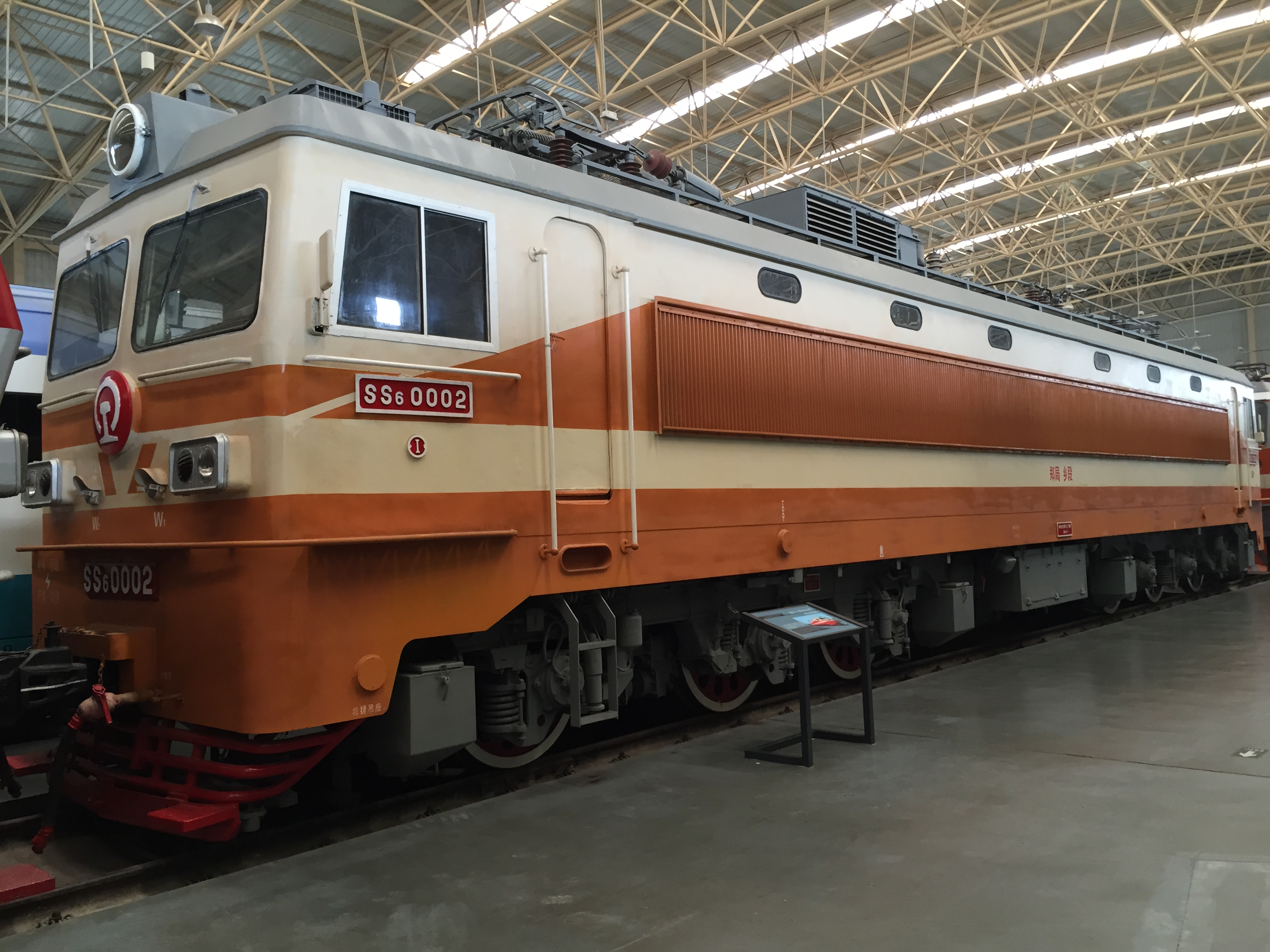
SS6-0002 at the China Railway Museum

- SS6-0001: is preserved at Zhengzhou Railway Driver College.
- SS6-0002: is preserved at China Railway Museum.

== See also ==
- China Railways SS3
- China Railways SS6B
- China Railways 8K
- Zhengzhou Railway Bureau
- Longhai Railway
