= China Railways BJ =

Chinese diesel-hydraulic locomotive class

Beijing 北京
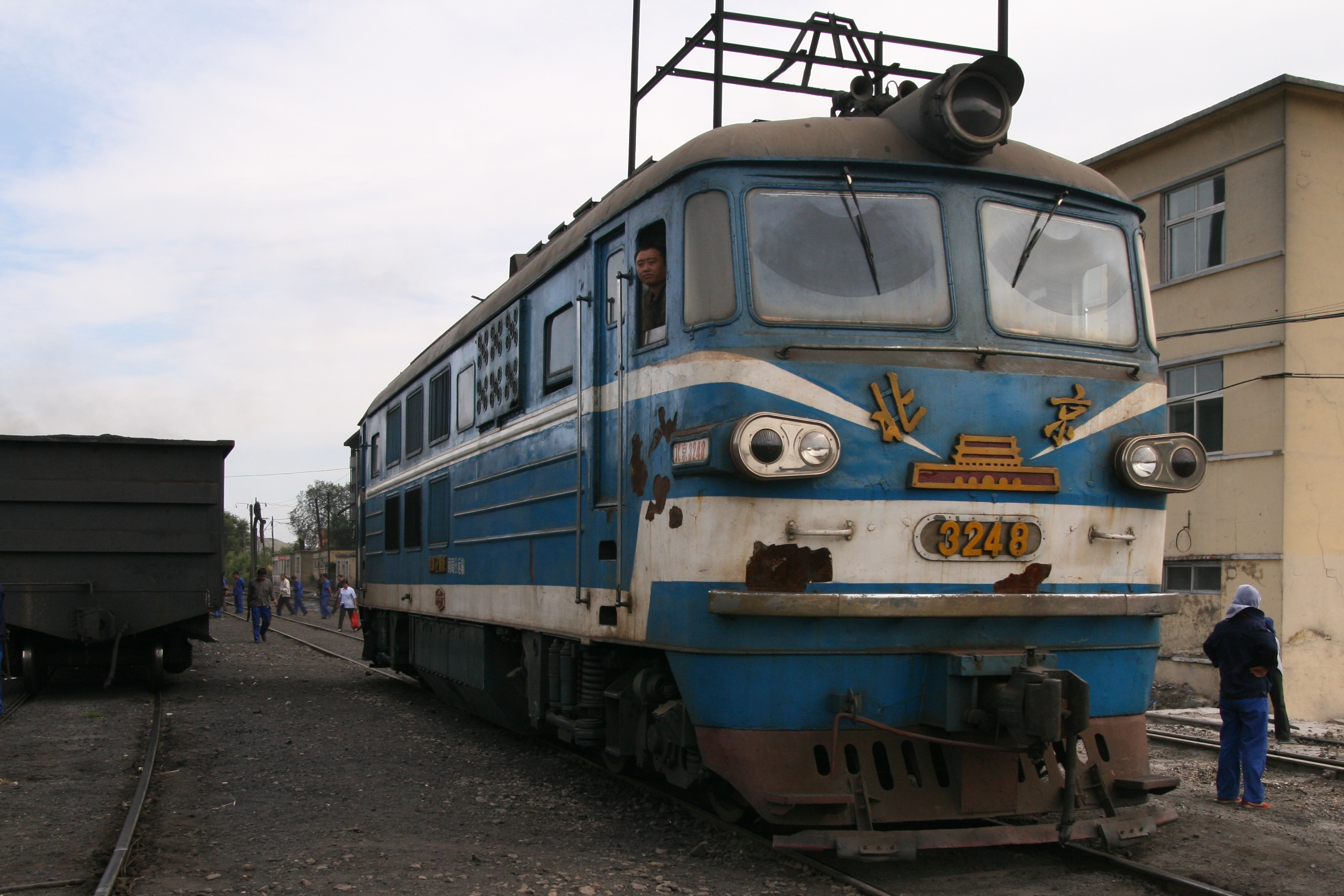
- BJ 3248 in Nanpiao, Liaoning
Type and origin
- Power type: Diesel-hydraulic
- Builder: February 7th Works; China
- Model: Standard
- Build date: 1970 - 1991
- Total produced: 346 (standard); 12 (24) (2-unit); 16 (port)
Specifications
- Configuration
  - UIC: B-B
- Gauge: 4 ft 8 1/2 in (1,435 mm)
- Wheel diameter: 1,050 mm (41 in)
- Minimum curve: 125 m (410 ft 1 in)
- Length: 15,045 mm (49 ft 4.3 in)
- Width: 3,285 mm (10 ft 9.3 in)
- Height: 4,512 mm (14 ft 9.6 in)
- Axle load: 23 t (51,000 lb)
- Loco weight: 92 t (203,000 lb)
- Fuel capacity: 5,500 L (1,500 US gal)
- Water cap.: 1,200 L (320 US gal)
- Prime mover: 12V240ZJA
- RPM range: 1100 rpm
- Engine type: V12 diesel
- Cylinders: 12
- Cylinder size: 240 mm × 260 mm (9.4 in × 10.2 in)
- Transmission: Hydraulic
Performance figures
- Maximum speed: 120 km/h (75 mph)
- Power output: 1,990 kW (2,670 hp)
- Tractive effort: 227 kN (51,000 lb_{f}) (starting); 163 kN (37,000 lb_{f}) (continuous)
Career
- Operators: China Railway (North Korea) Korean State Railway
- Numbers: (China) BJ 1001 - 1012 (port, std g) (China) BJ 1101 - 1104 (port, brd g) (China) BJ 2001A/B - 2012A/B (2-unit) (China) BJ 3001 - 3346 (standard) (China) BJ 6001 (trunk freight) (North Korea) 내연301 - 내연333

The Beijing (Chinese: 北京; pinyin: Běijīng), mostly referred to as BJ, is a diesel-hydraulic locomotive used in the People's Republic of China. It is named after the capital city of China, Beijing.

BJ were made in two different versions, a standard version and a kou'an (port) version. China Railways DF7D, a diesel electric locomotive based on DF7B, has a similar appearance to the Beijing locomotive.

== North Korea ==
From 2002 the Korean State Railway has received a number of BJ class locomotives second-hand from China. They are used mostly for heavy shunting and on local freight trains around P'yŏngyang. At least 33 have been delivered, numbered in the 내연301 - 내연333 series (내연 = Naeyŏn, "internal combustion"); most are still painted in their original Chinese blue livery, but a few have been repainted into the standard North Korean scheme of light blue over dark green, and at least one, 내연310, is painted in a scheme identical to the Chinese green livery used on Chinese DF4 locomotives.

== Gallery ==
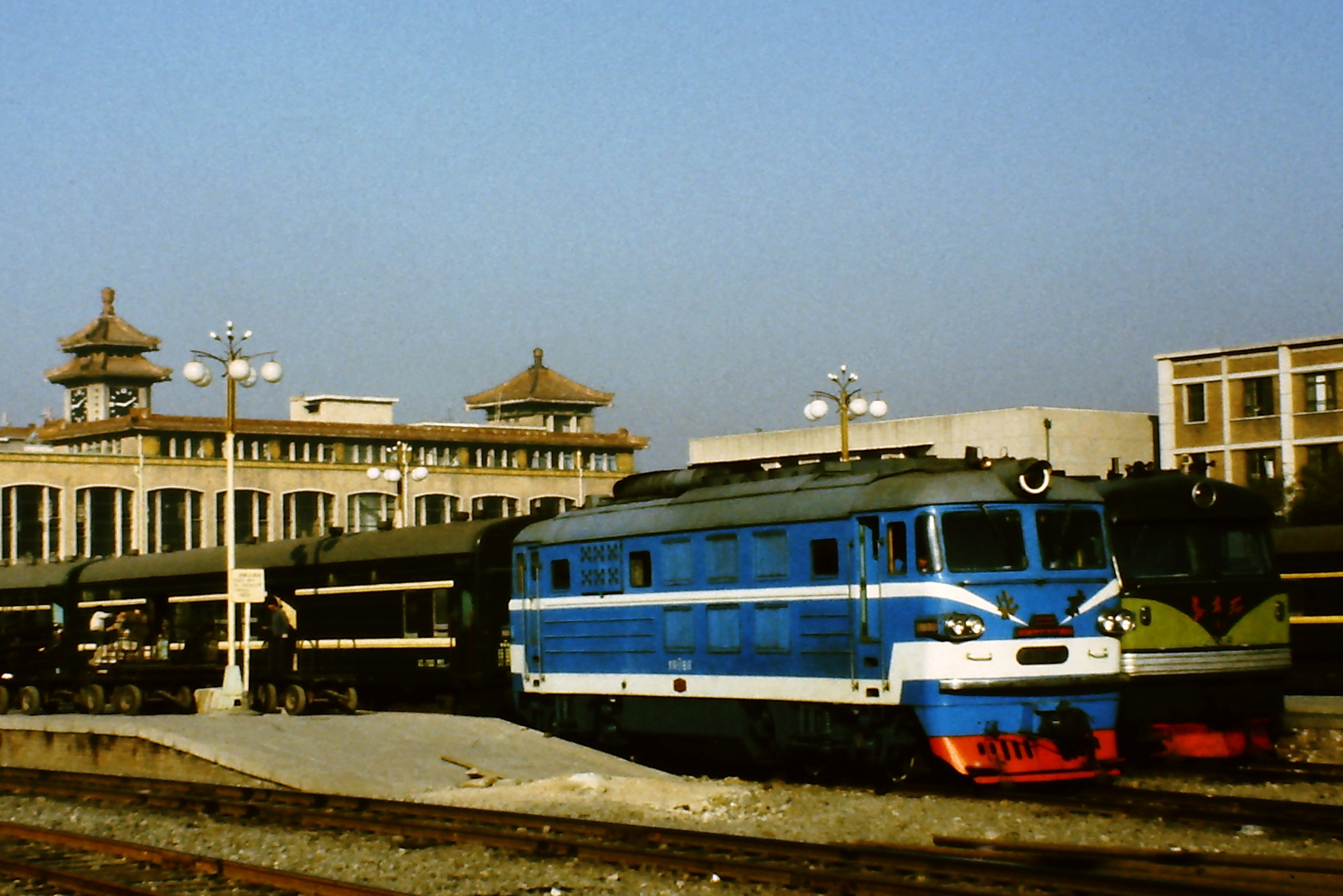
BJ at Beijing Railway Station

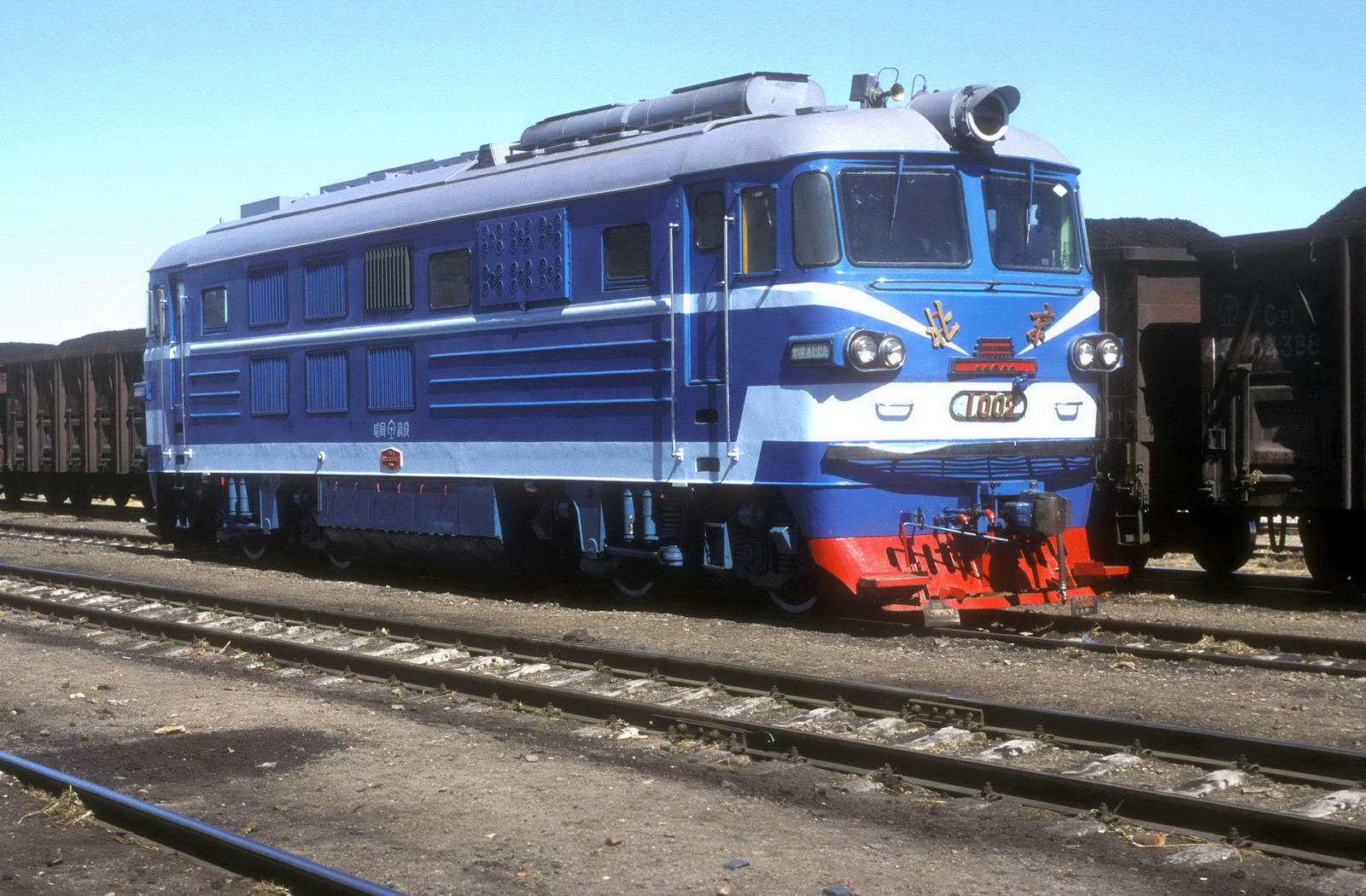
BJ 1002 at Manzhouli Railway Station

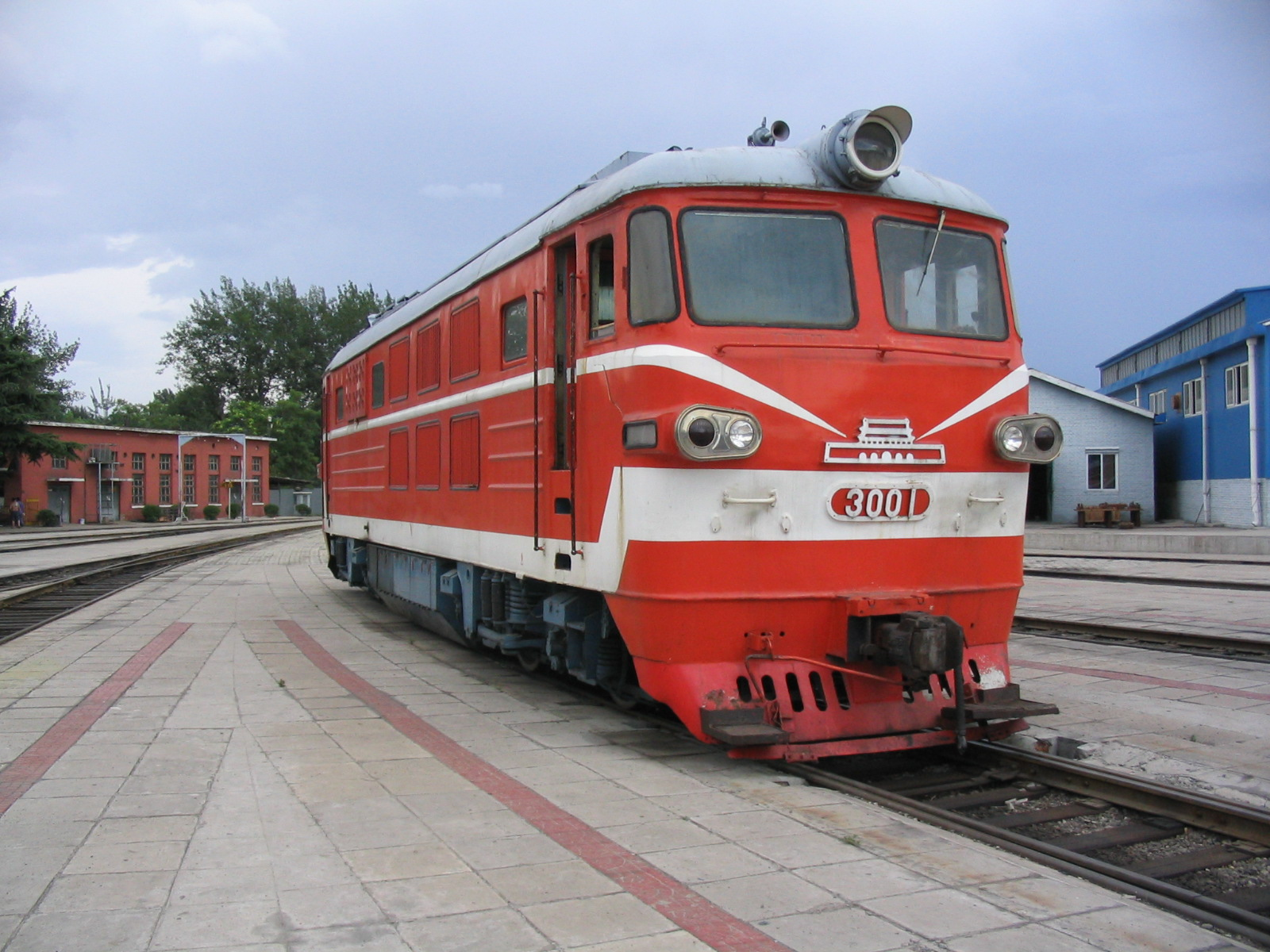
BJ 3001 at Beijing Erqi Locomotive Factory

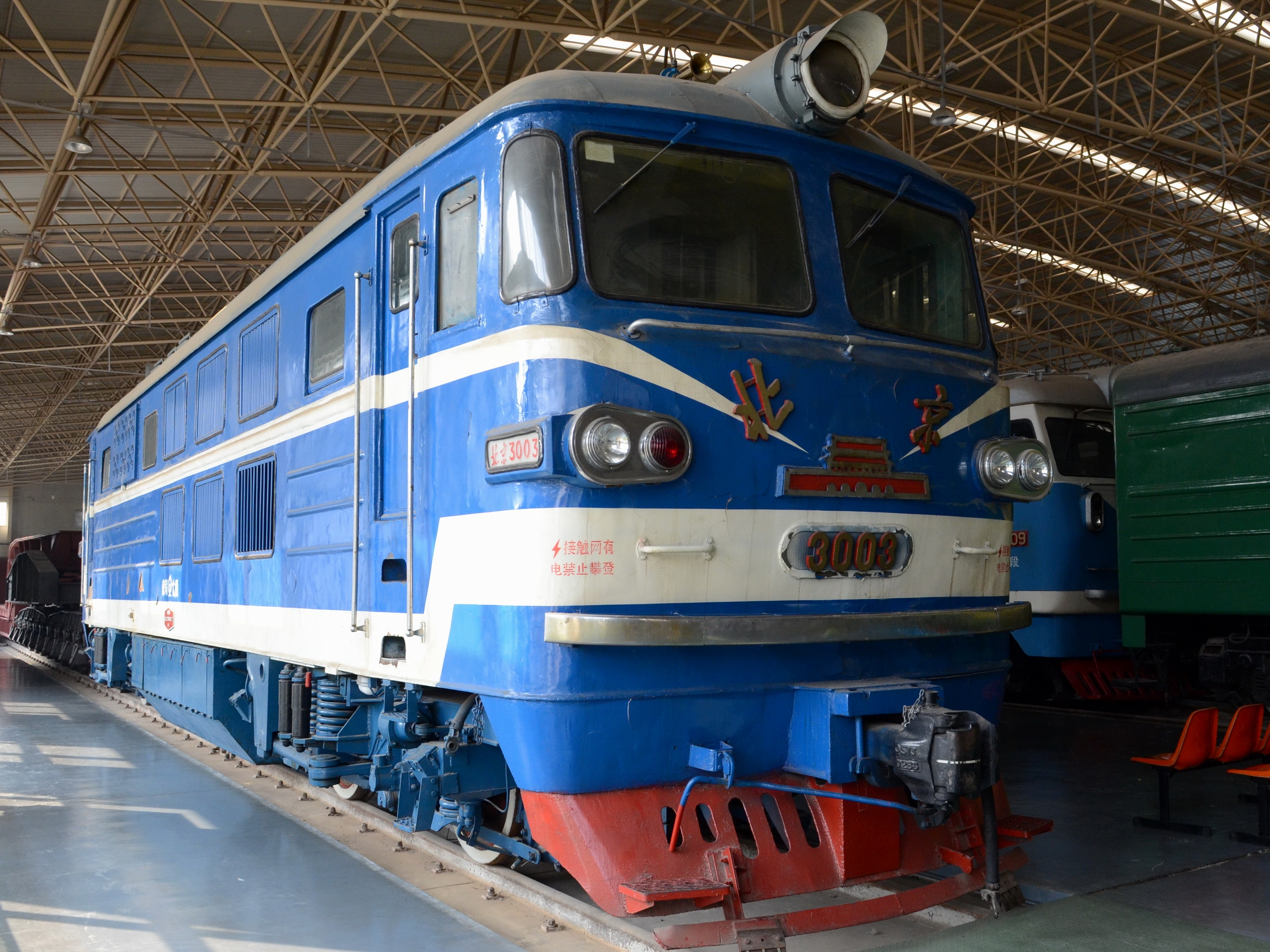
BJ 3003 at the China Railway Museum

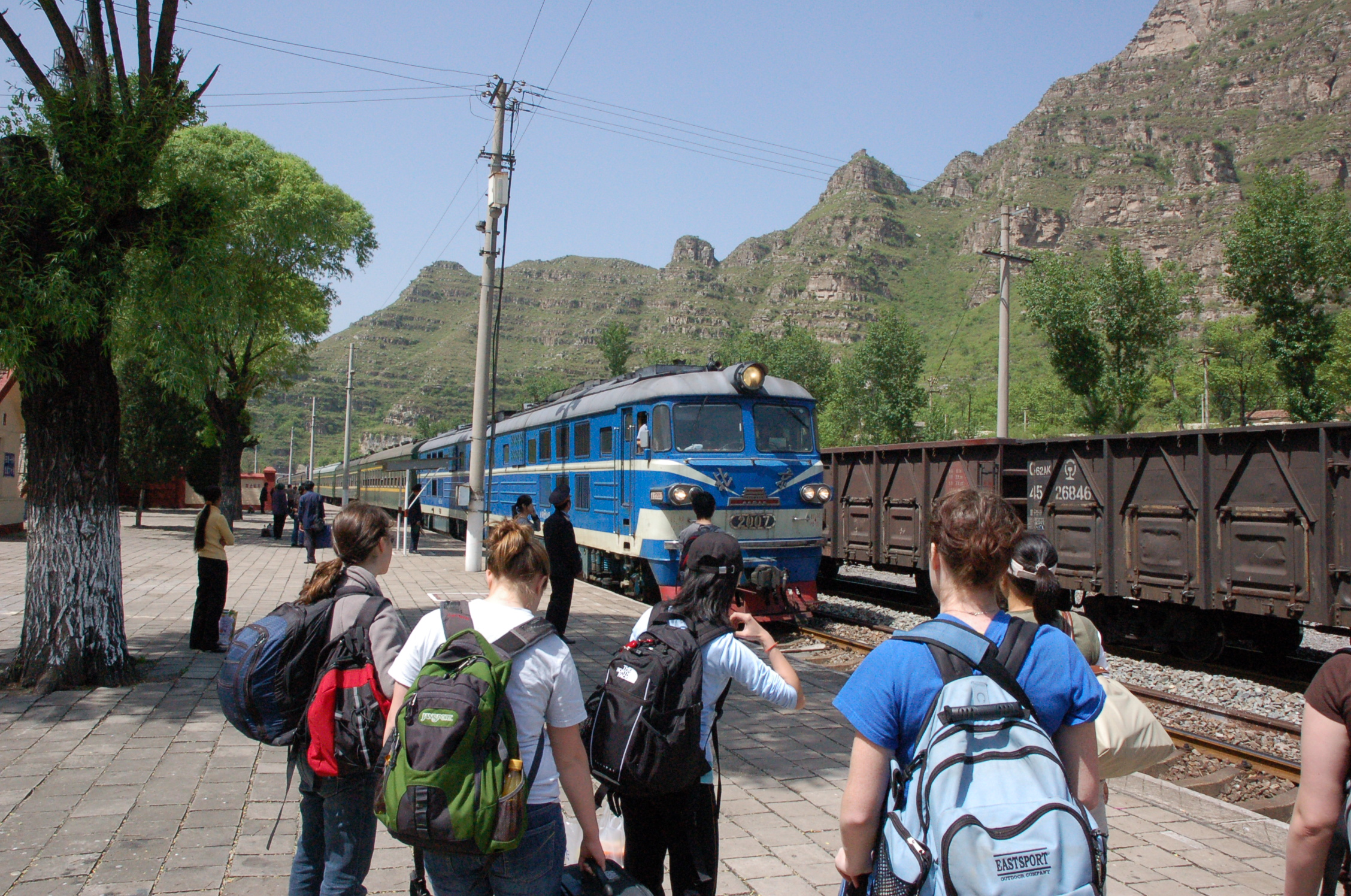
BJ 2007 at Shidu station in Fangshan District, Beijing

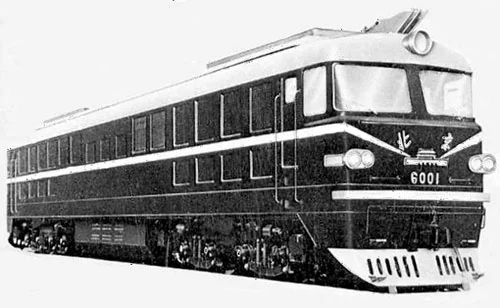
BJ 6001 (built type EQJ1)
