= China Railways AM3 =

China Railways AM3 Shanghai–Nanjing Railway Class 400
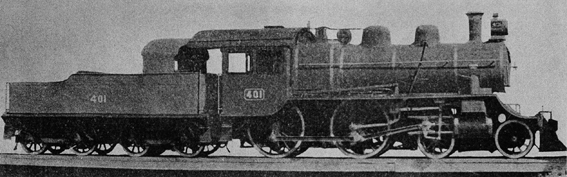
- Locomotive number 401 of the Huning Railway
Type and origin
- Power type: Steam
- Builder: American Locomotive Company
- Build date: 1923−1929
- Total produced: 26
Specifications
- Configuration
  - Whyte: 4-4-0
- Gauge: 1,435 mm (4 ft 8 1/2 in) standard gauge
- Driver dia.: 2,000 mm (78.74 in)
- Length: 17,340 mm (56 ft 10 5/8 in)
- Total weight: 103.9 t (102.3 long tons; 114.5 short tons)
- Fuel type: Coal
- Cylinders: Two, outside
Career
- Operators: Huning Railway; Central China Railway; China Railway
- Class: HR: 400 series CR: ㄚㄇ3 (1951−1955)
- Number in class: 26
- Numbers: HR: 401−426

The China Railways AM3 class steam locomotive was a class of 4-4-0 "Eight-Wheeler" type steam locomotives operated by the China Railway, built by the American Locomotive Company in the United States between 1923 and 1929.

Twenty-six of these locomotives were originally built for the Huning Railway. After the establishment of the puppet government of the Reformed Government of the Republic of China during the Japanese occupation, they were operated by the Central China Railway, which had been created in 1939 to manage all railway operations in the territory of the collaborationist government by nationalising all privately owned railways in the territory.

After the end of the Pacific War, these locomotives were passed on to the Republic of China Railway. After the establishment of the People's Republic of China, China Railways designated them ㄚㄇ3 (AM3) class in 1951; the class was retired in 1955.
