= China Railways XK13 =

Class of Chinese steam locomotives

XK13
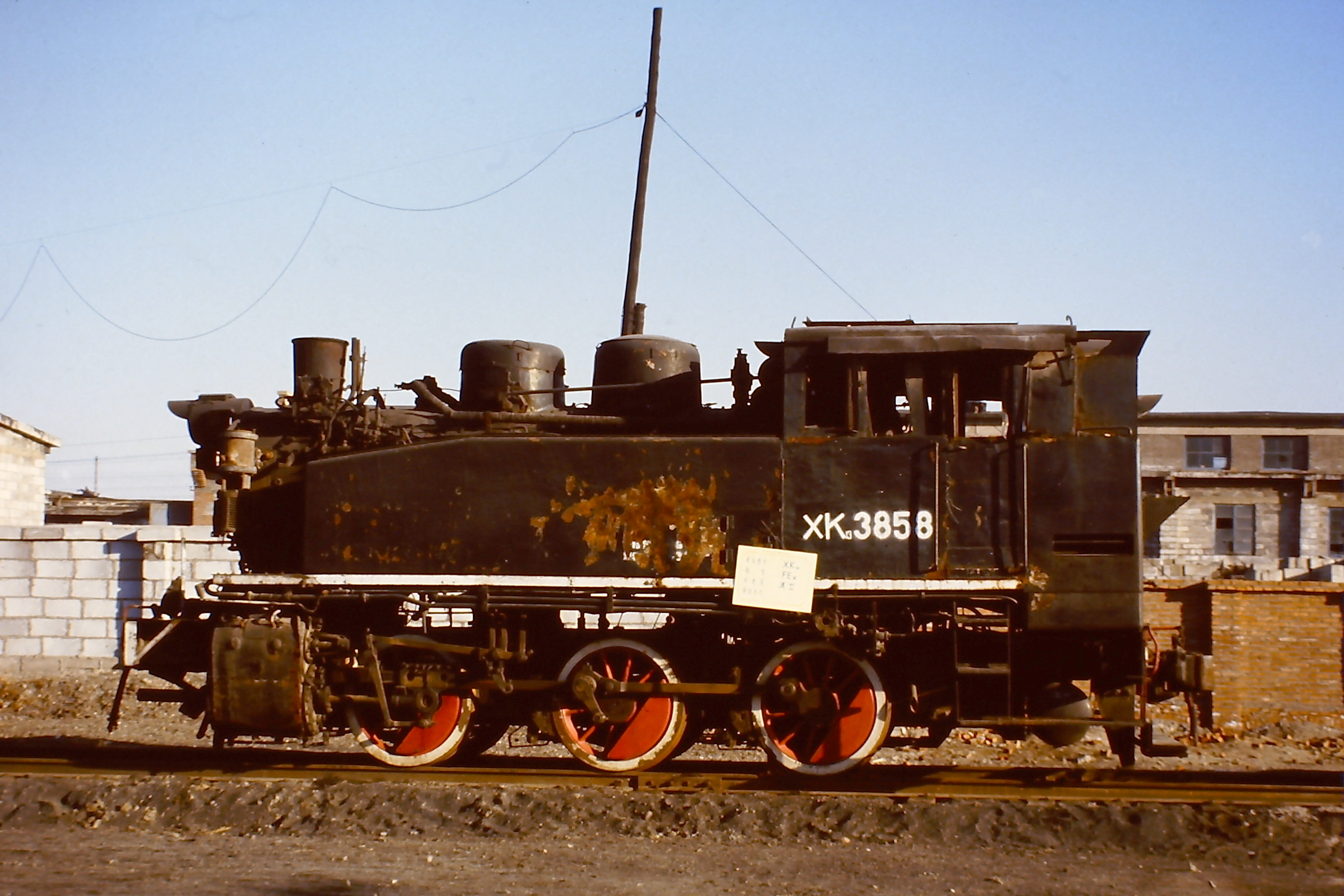
- XK13-3858 at the Shenyang Steam Locomotive Museum
Type and origin
- Power type: Steam
- Builder: Fablok
- Build date: 1958-1960
- Total produced: 82
Specifications
- Configuration
  - Whyte: 0-6-0T
- Gauge: 1,435 mm
- Length: 9.1 m
- Loco weight: 44 t
- Fuel type: Coal
- Cylinders: Two, outside
- Cylinder size: 460 mm x 540 mm
- Valve gear: Walschaerts
Performance figures
- Maximum speed: 40 km/h
Career
- Operators: China Railway

The China Railways XK13 was a class of 0-6-0T "Switcher" type tank locomotive class of the China Railway. It belongs to the so-called industrial tank locomotives and is one of two classes of this type that Poland exported to China in the late 1950s/early 1960s.

== General ==
The Polish steam locomotive factory Fablok in Chrzanów delivered a total of 82 locomotives of this class to China between 1958 and 1960, all of which were equipped with center couplers. They were among the 480 machines of the Polish T3A series. All of the engines served in the Chinese steel industry throughout their entire service life. Only a few remained in use until the end of the 1980s. The last operations took place in 1990 in the iron and steel industry in Beijing and in 1991 at the Baotou steelworks. Today, a museum locomotive is on display as a memorial at each of the steelworks in both cities. A total of four locomotives have survived.

== Technical data ==
The two-cylinder tank locomotive reaches a top speed of 40 km/h and has a total weight of 44 tons. It holds 3.5 tons of coal and 5 m^{3} of water.
