= China Railways SS3 =

Chinese electric locomotive class

SS3 韶山3
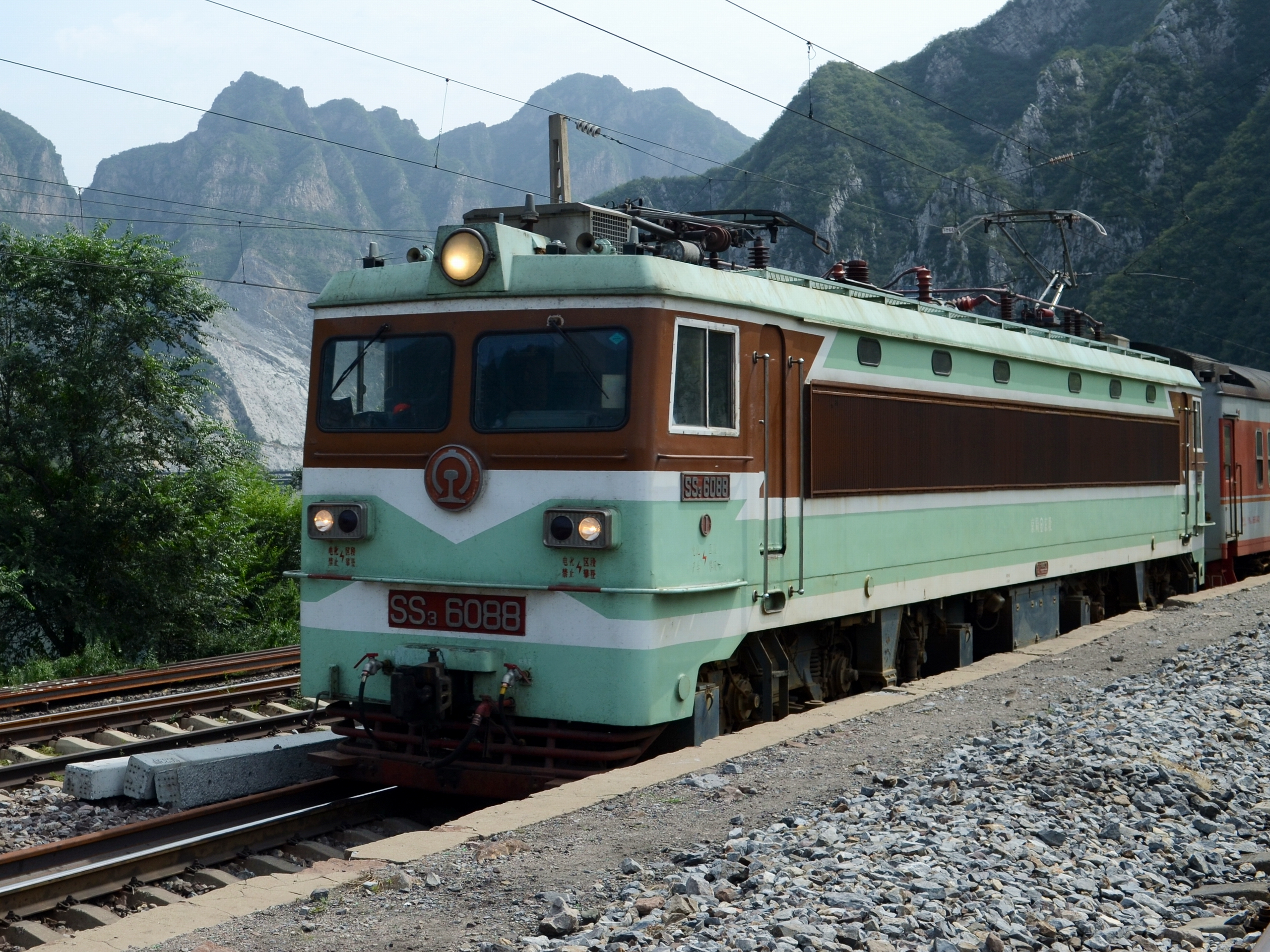
- SS3-6088, Luopoling Railway Station, Beijing, September 2011.
Type and origin
- Power type: Electric
Specifications
- Configuration
  - UIC: Co′Co′
- Gauge: 1,435 mm (4 ft 8 1/2 in)
- Electric system/s: 25 kV AC Catenary
- Current pickup(s): Pantograph

The Shaoshan 3 (Chinese: 韶山3) is a type of electric locomotive used on the People's Republic of China's national railway system. This locomotive was the third Chinese electric main line locomotive, built by the Zhuzhou Electric Locomotive Works.

== Preservation ==
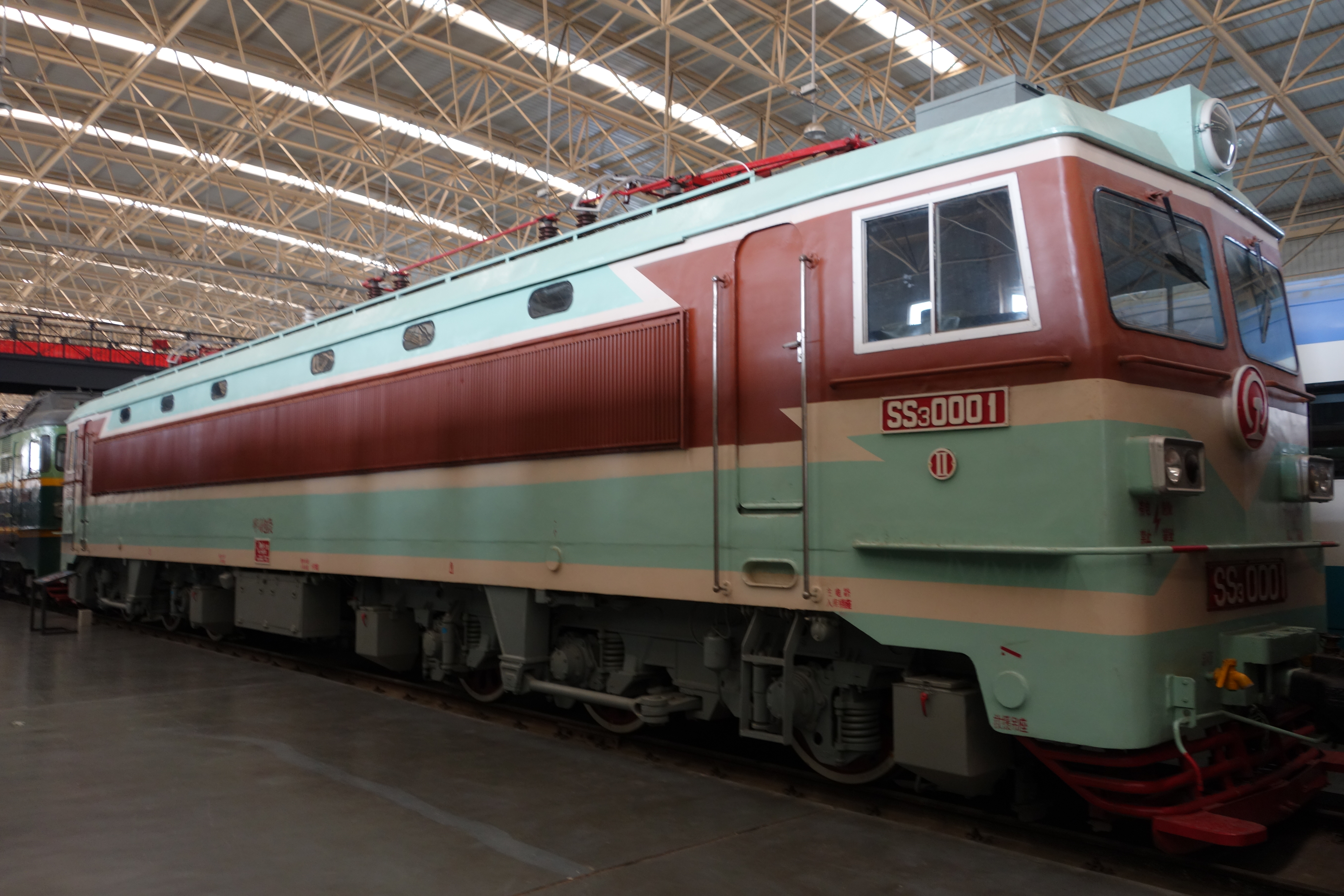
SS3-0001 at the China Railway Museum

- SS3-0001: is preserved at the China Railway Museum
- SS3-0023: is preserved at Central South University
