= CRRC Datong =

Chinese railway locomotive manufacturing plant based in Datong, Shanxi, China

Coordinates: 40.0744°N 113.2488°E

CRRC Datong Co. Ltd.
- Native name: 中车大同电力机车有限责任公司
- Type: wholly owned subsidiary
- Industry: Rail
- Founded: 1953
- Headquarters: Datong, Shanxi, China
- Products: Locomotives
- Parent: CRRC
- Website: crrcgc.cc/dt

CRRC Datong Co. Ltd. (Chinese: 中车大同电力机车有限责任公司; lit. 'CRRC Datong Electric Locomotive Co.', 'Ltd.') is a Chinese railway locomotive manufacturing plant based in Datong, Shanxi, China, founded in 1953. The factory was a major producer of steam locomotives for the Chinese market up to 1988 when production switched to diesel powered locomotives. By the 1990s electric locomotives had begun to be produced, and became the major product of the works.

In 2003, the factory became CNR Datong Electric Locomotive Co. Ltd. (DELC) and a subsidiary of China CNR Corporation as part of a re-organisation of the Chinese railway manufacturing industry.

== History ==
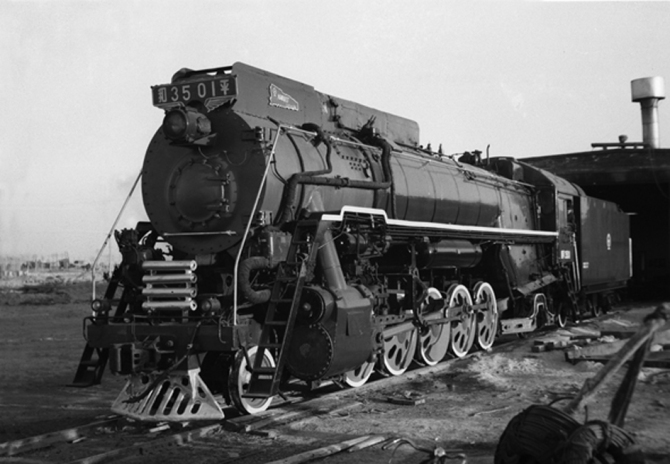
The first steam locomotive produced by Datong Locomotive Works (1959)

The Datong Locomotive Factory was founded in 1954 as part of the first Chinese five-year plan for economic development. The first locomotive was produced in 1959.

By 1988, the factory had produced over 5000 steam locomotives, and was a major steam locomotive manufacturer in the People's Republic of China, by the 1980s manufacturing between 250 and 300 locomotives yearly; many of these units were QJ "march forward" 2–10–2 heavy freight locomotives. Steam locomotive production at Datong was a vertically integrated process, starting from raw steel. The last steam locomotive to be produced at the plant, was made on 21 December 1988.

In the 1980s, the plant began to manufacture diesel locomotives, including types DF4B and DF4C. By 1999, over 600 diesel locomotives had been produced.

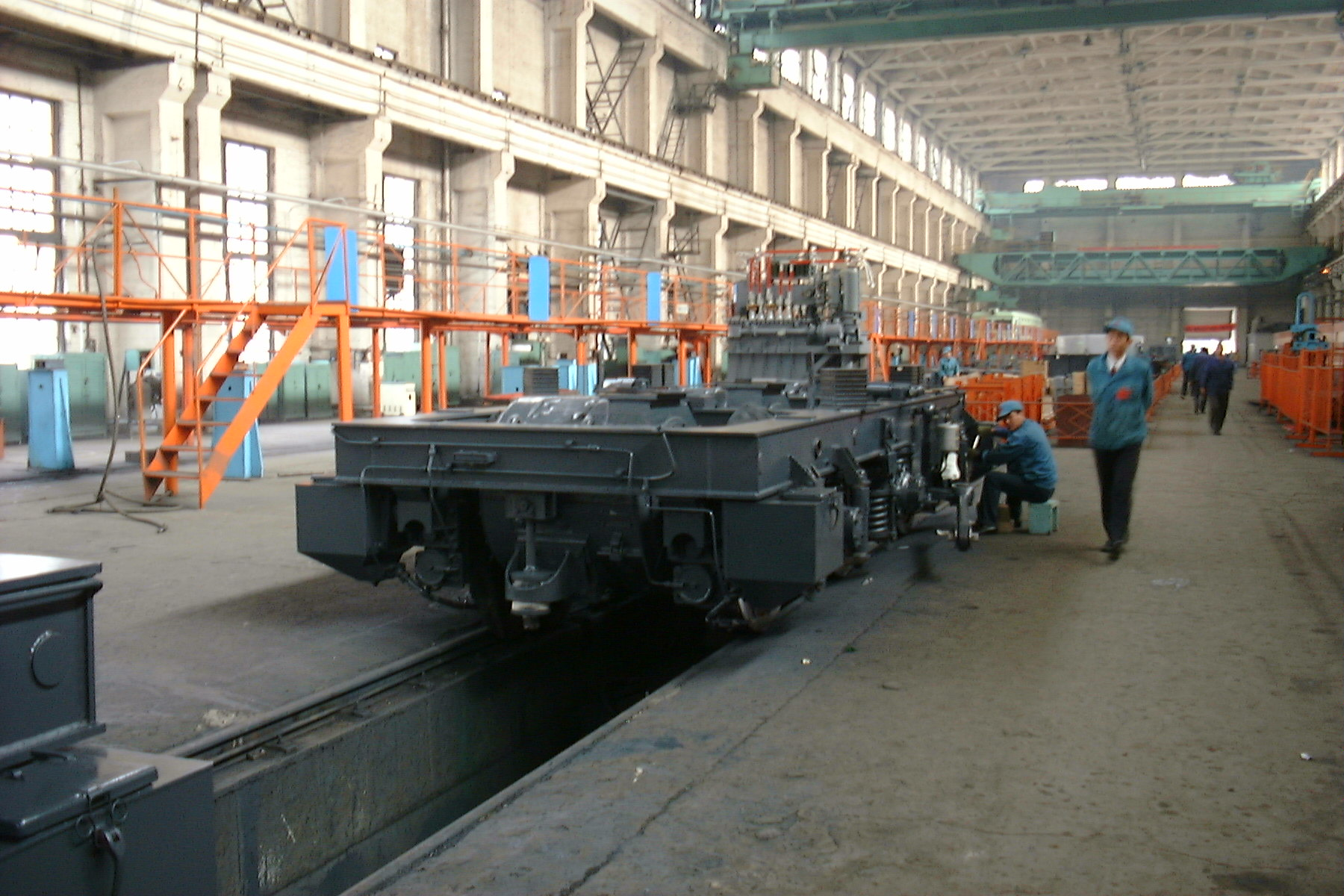
Bogie inside Datong factory (1999)

In 1990, the plant began to produce electric locomotives – the SS7 six axle Bo'Bo'Bo' and the SS7E Co'Co' mainline electrics were developed and manufactured at Datong. The company was also jointly involved with Zhuzhou Electric Locomotive Works in the high-speed passenger EMU development project China Star in 2002.

In 2003, the company became part of the China CNR Corporation as CNR Datong Electric Locomotive Co. Ltd..

In 2004, the company entered into a manufacturing and technology transfer agreement with Alstom, leading to the production of the HXD2 series of locomotive classes. The first HXD2 locomotive to be manufactured in China was completed in 2007. In August 2012, the first example of a localised version of the HXD2 locomotive was produced by the factory, numbered HXD2-1001.

== Joint ventures ==
The company has entered into joint ventures with ABC Rail Products (1996, castings), Stennmann (2002, Pantographs), Alstom (2004, locomotive manufacture), ABB Group (2007, electric transformers), SEMCO (India) (2007, wheelsets) and Faiveley (2007, railway couplers).

== Museum ==
The factory site also included a museum, which was moved to Beijing in 2004.
