= China Railways 6K =

Class of Chinese electric locomotives

6K
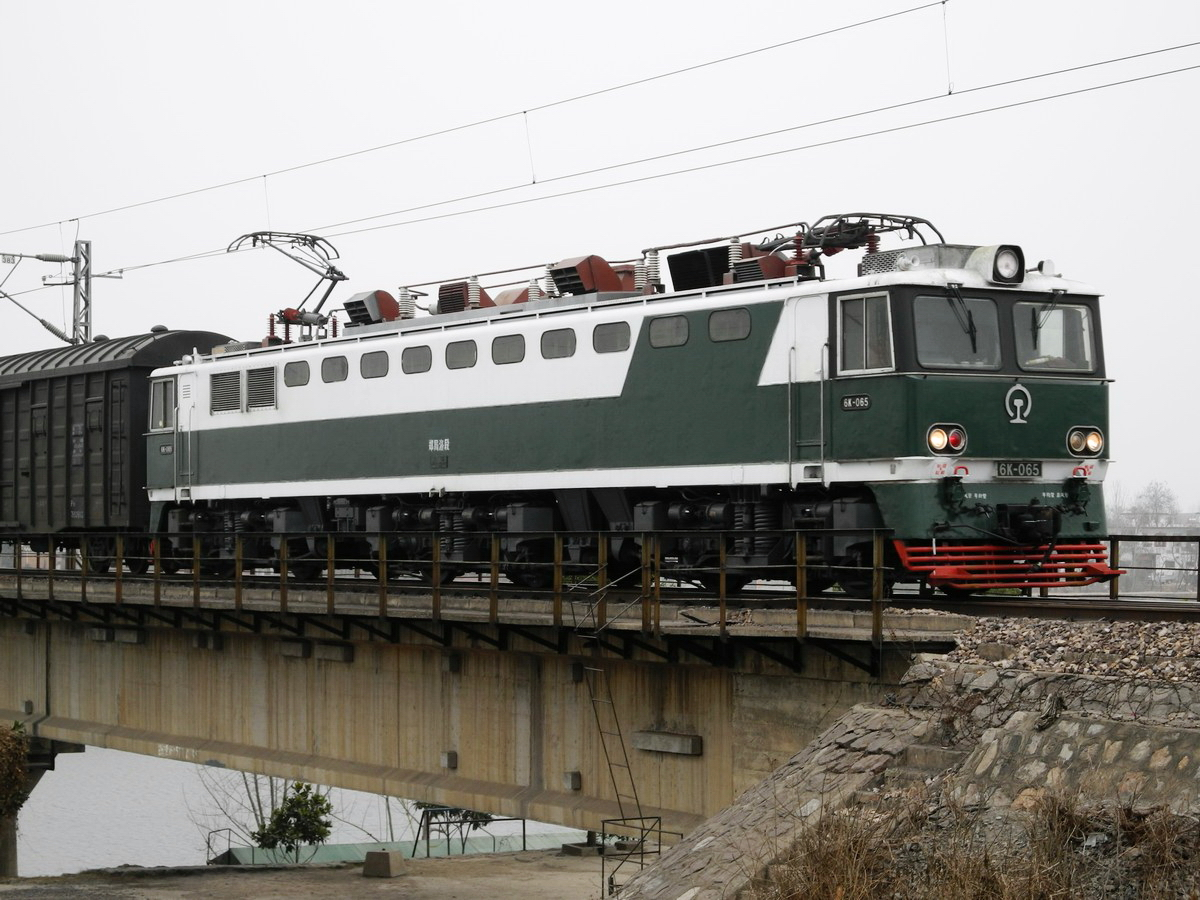
- 6K-065 in 2014
Type and origin
- Power type: Electric
- Builder: Kawasaki Heavy Industries
- Build date: 1986-1987
- Total produced: 85
Specifications
- Configuration
  - UIC: Bo'Bo'Bo'
- Gauge: 1,435 mm (4 ft 8 1/2 in) standard gauge
- Length: 22.2 m (72 ft 10 in)
- Axle load: 23 t (22.6 long tons; 25.4 short tons)
- Loco weight: 138 t (135.8 long tons; 152.1 short tons)
- Electric system/s: 25 kV AC Catenary
- Current pickup: Pantograph
- Traction motors: Mitsubishi Electric MB-530-AVR
Performance figures
- Maximum speed: 100 km/h (62 mph)
- Power output: 4,800 kW (6,400 hp)
- Tractive effort: 485 kN (109,000 lb_{f}) (starting); 355 kN (80,000 lb_{f}) (continuous)
Career
- Operators: China Railway
- Numbers: 6K-001-6K-086
- Last run: 2014

The 6K is a Japanese-built electric locomotive used in China. It is developed and built by Kawasaki Heavy Industries and Mitsubishi Electric. The design of 6K is based on JNR Class ED75 and EF66 electric locomotives. It is the first locomotive with Bo-Bo-Bo wheel arrangement used in China.

== Production ==
In total 85 6Ks were built between 1986 and 1987.

== Equipment ==
Each 6K locomotive uses CLG-616 phase splitter and 6 Mitsubishi Electric MB-530-AVR DC traction motors.

== Performance ==
6K was one of the most reliable electric locomotives in China compared with SS1, SS2 and SS3 at the time of entering service. China later made SS7 locomotive with reference to the Tri-Bo wheel arrangement of 6K, the breakdown rate, however, was still high, until its modified version SS7B, SS7C and SS7D designed.

== Retirement ==
The mass retirement of the 6K fleet began in the second half of 2013 due to aging and reliability issues.

The final use of a 6K locomotive was on 21 March 2014 when the 6918/6919 passenger train from Jiafeng arrived at Luoyang station.

== Preservation ==
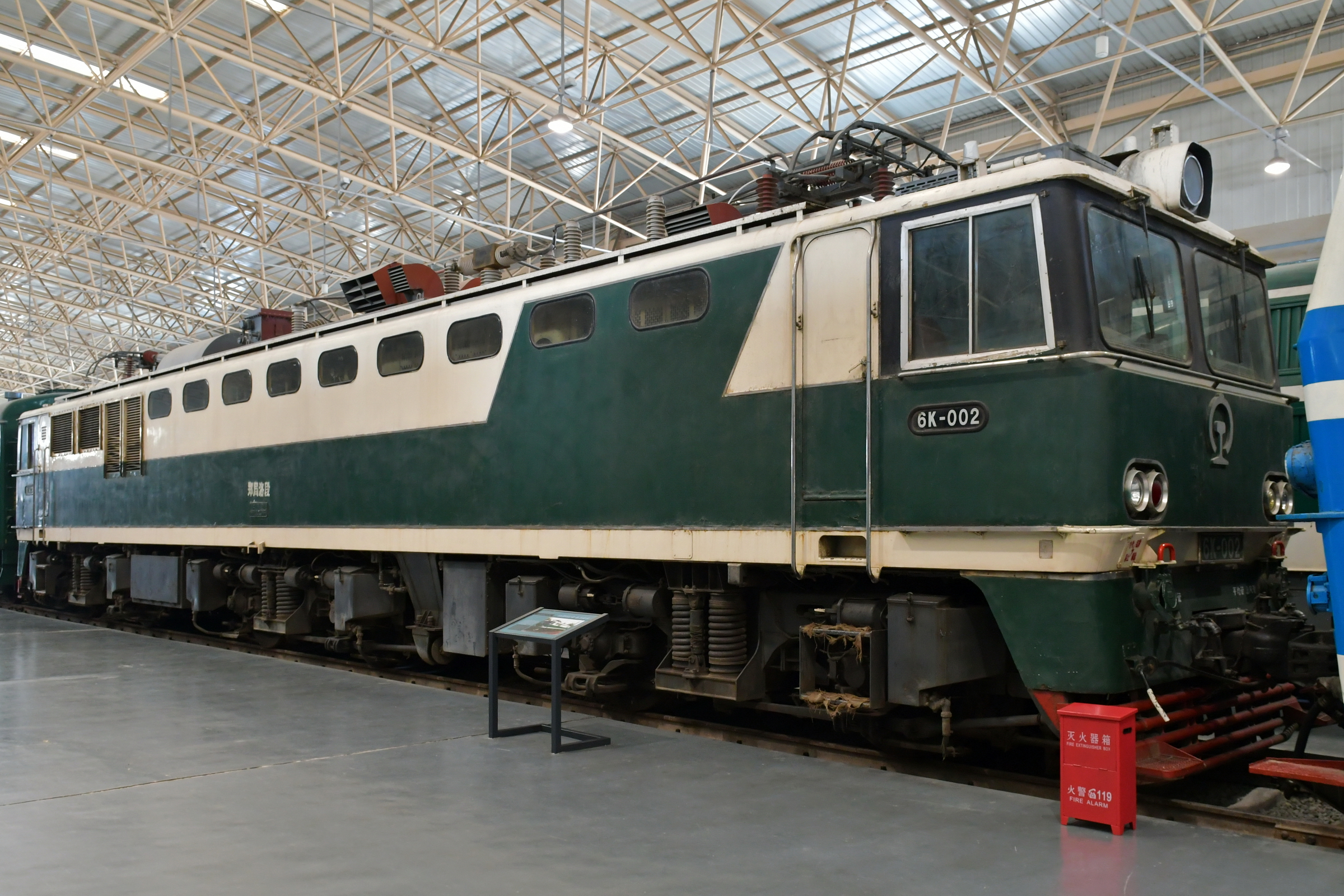
6K-002 at the China Railway Museum

- 6K-001: is preserved at Luoyang Locomotive Depot, Zhengzhou Railway Bureau
- 6K-002: is preserved at China Railway Museum

== See also ==
- China Railways SS7
