= China Railways SS7 =

Chinese electric locomotive class

SS7 韶山7
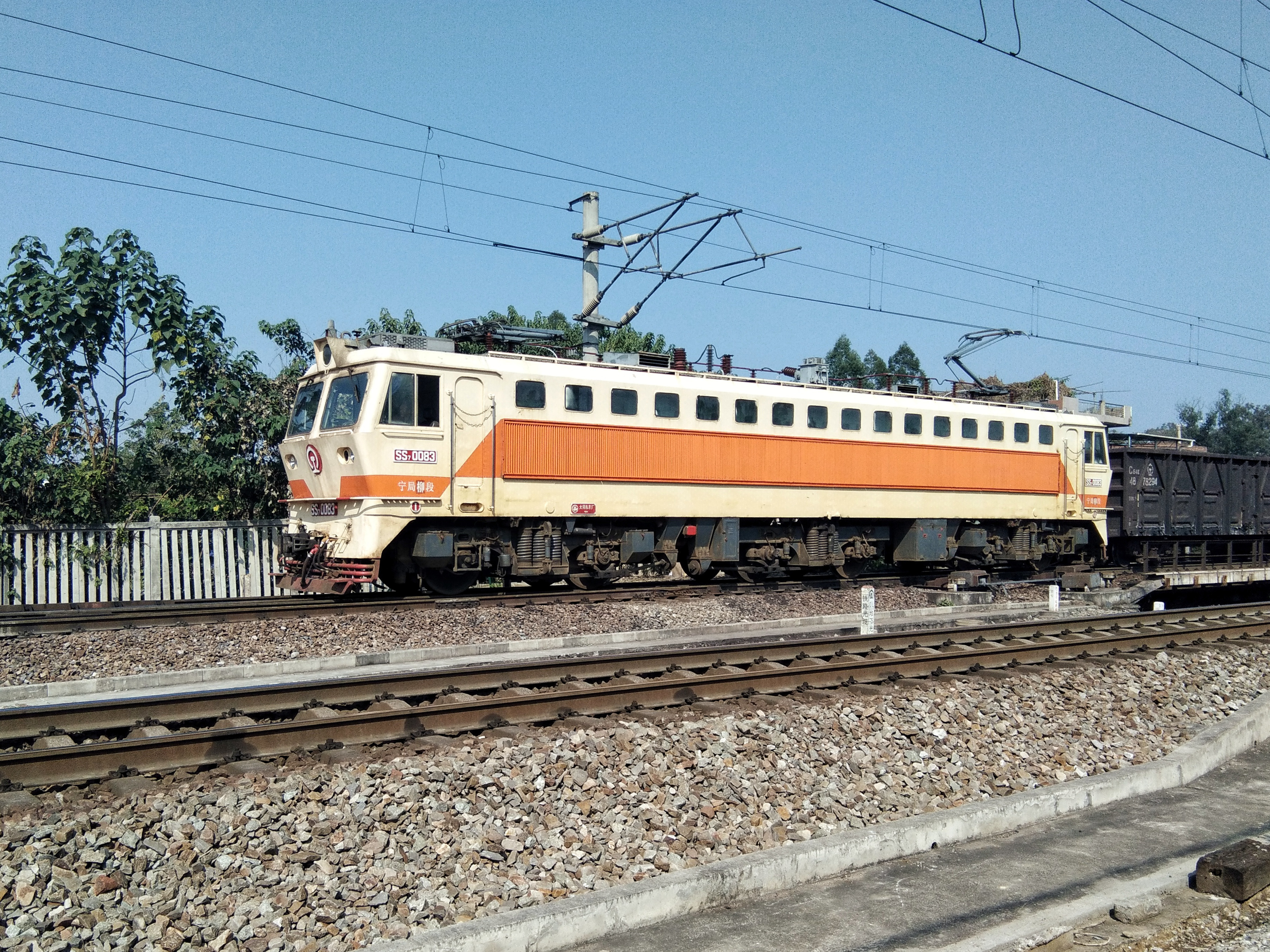
- SS7-0083, Zhegujiang railway station, December 2017
Type and origin
- Power type: Electric
- Builder: CRRC Datong
- Model: SS_{7}
- Build date: 1992–2007
- Total produced: 113
Specifications
- Configuration
  - UIC: Bo'Bo'Bo' (Except SS7E use Co'Co')
- Gauge: 1,435 mm (4 ft 8 1/2 in)
- Wheelbase: 17,080 mm (56 ft 0 in)
- Length: 22,016 mm (72 ft 2.8 in) (between coupler centers)
- Width: 3,105 mm (10 ft 2.2 in)
- Height: 4,700 mm (15 ft 5 in) ± 30 mm (1.2 in)
- Axle load: 23 t (22.6 long tons; 25.4 short tons)
- Electric system/s: 25 kV AC Catenary
- Current pickup(s): Pantograph
- Transmission: AC – DC
Performance figures
- Maximum speed: 100 km/h (62 mph)
- Power output: 4,800 kW (6,400 hp)
- Tractive effort: 485 kN (109,000 lb_{f}) (starting); 351 kN (79,000 lb_{f}) (continuous)

The Shaoshan 7 (Chinese: 韶山7) is a type of electric locomotive used on the People's Republic of China's national railway system. They are widely used on electrified lines in the southwest part of China.

== Design ==
The design of SS7 was influenced by the 6K, an electric locomotive model imported from Japan.

The first SS7 was built in 1992 in Datong. In 1997, SS7s were used in Nanning-Kunming Railway. However, SS7's frequent failure lead to Datong Electric Locomotive Works making improvements to SS7s. Failure was reduced to just four cases in one year in 2004.

SS7 Electric Locomotive was still produced as of 2007. Most of SS7s belong to Liuzhou Locomotive Depot, Nanning Railway Bureau. The last two SS7s (8112 and 8113) belong to Xiaoyi-Liulin Railway, which is located in Shanxi.

== Derivatives ==
Derivatives of SS7 include SS7B, SS7C, SS7D and SS7E.

=== SS7B ===
In 1997, Datong Electric Locomotive Works developed the SS7B Electric Locomotive. There were only two SS7Bs manufactured, both SS7Bs' each axis axle load 25 tons.

At first, two SS7Bs belonged to Kunming Locomotive Depot, Kunming Railway Bureau. Later the two SS7Bs were transferred to Nanning Locomotive Depot, Nanning Railway Bureau. In 2005, SS7B-0001 was destroyed in an accident which happened on the Nanning-Kunming Railway.

=== SS7C ===
In 1998, Datong Electric Locomotive Works and Zhuzhou Electric Locomotive Research Institute, Chengdu Locomotive and Rolling Stock Works developed SS7C Electric Locomotive. There were 171 SS7Cs manufactured.

SS7Cs' each axis axle load 22 tons, and support head-end power. Its maximum speed is 120 km/h (75 mph).

=== SS7D ===
In 1999, Datong Electric Locomotive Works and Zhuzhou Electric Locomotive Research Institute, Chengdu Locomotive and Rolling Stock Works developed SS7D Electric Locomotive. There were 59 SS7Ds manufactured, and belong to Xi'an Locomotive Depot, Xi'an Railway Bureau.

SS7D use lightweight design, each axis axle load 21 tons, and support head-end power. Its maximum speed is 170 km/h (110 mph).

=== SS7E ===
In 2001, Datong Electric Locomotive Works and Dalian Electric Traction R & D Center, Dalian Locomotive & Rolling Stock Works developed the SS7E Electric Locomotive. There were 146 SS7Es manufactured.

SS7E use lightweight design, however its axle arrangement is Co'Co'. Each axis axle load 21 tons, and support head-end power. Its maximum speed is 170 km/h (110 mph).

== Named locomotive ==
- SS7-0076, "May 4th's Red Flag" (Chinese: 五四红旗号).
- SS7D-0631,"Steelers Iron Horse"(Chinese: 钢人铁马号).

== Gallery ==
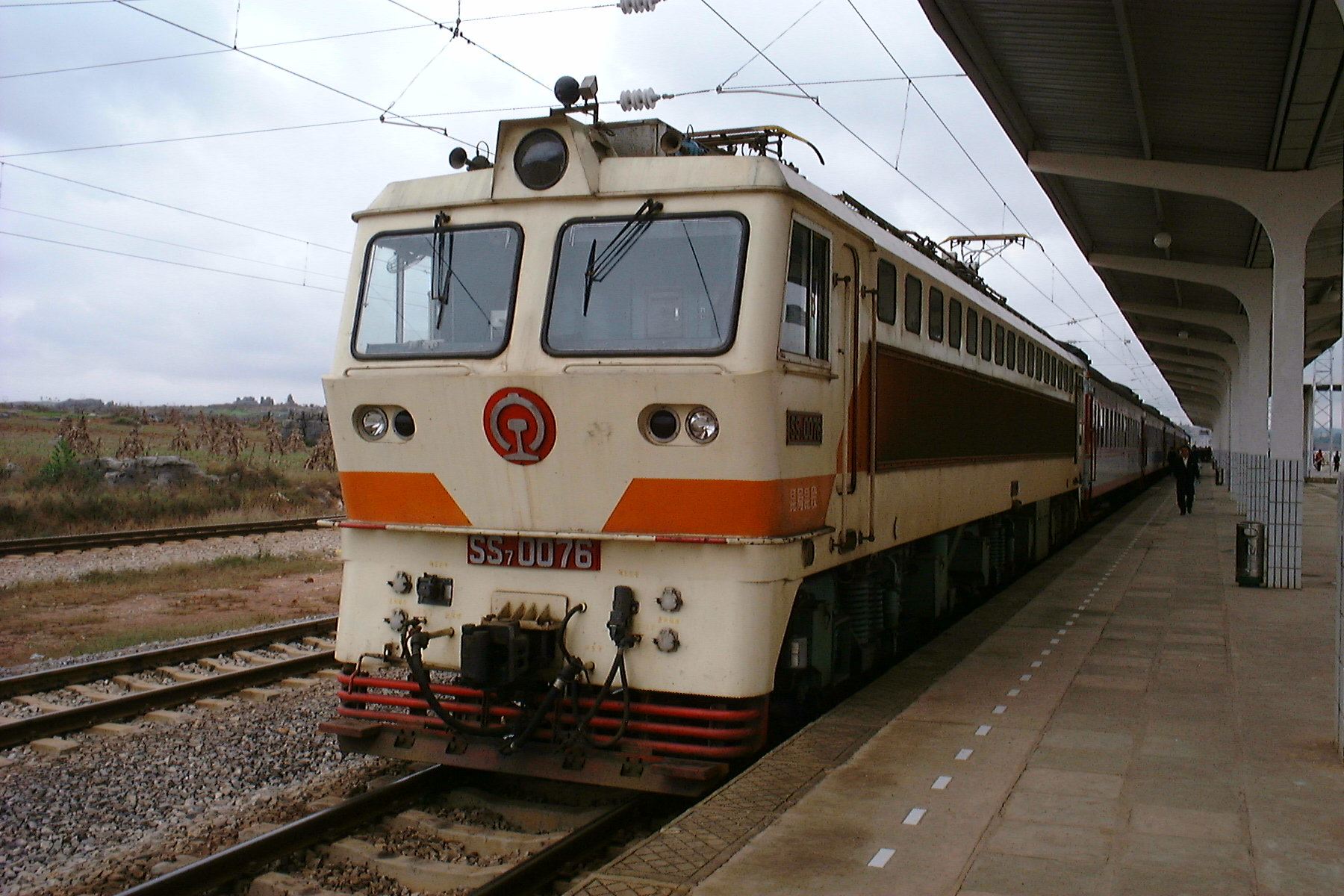
SS7-0076 "4 May's Red Flag", Shilin, 1999

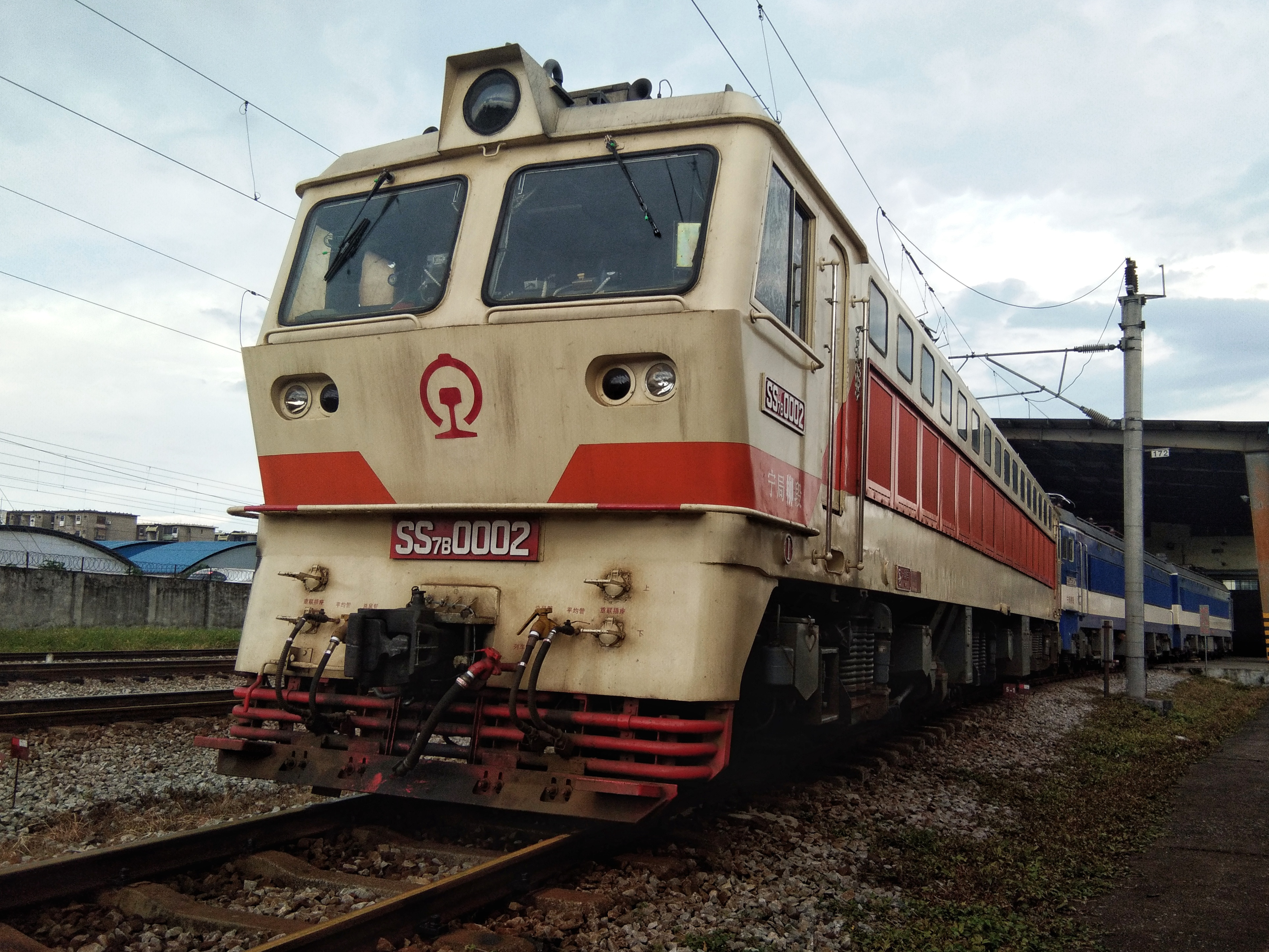
SS7B-0002, May 2018

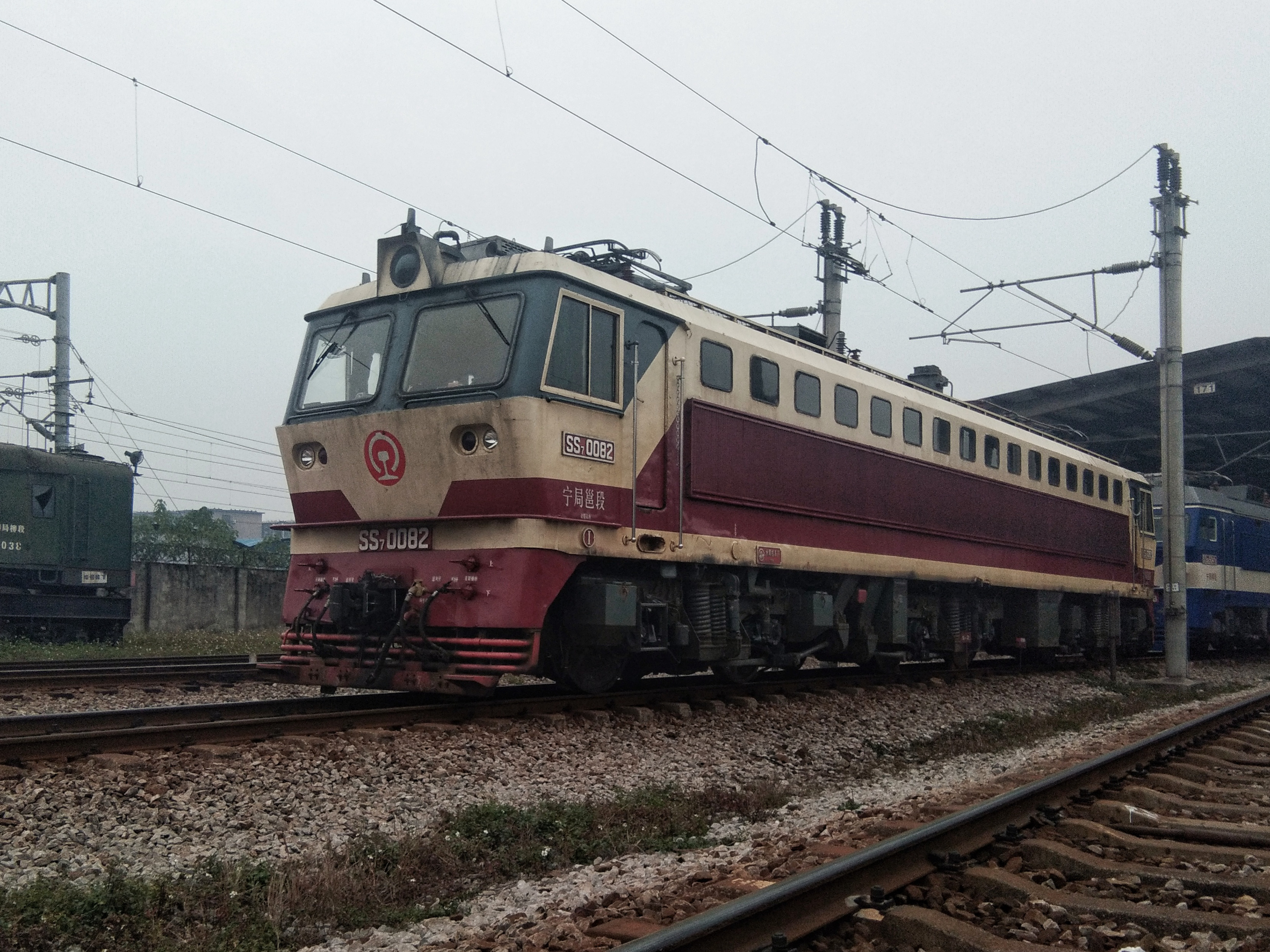
SS7-0082 is a verify locomotive during the development China Railways SS7C.

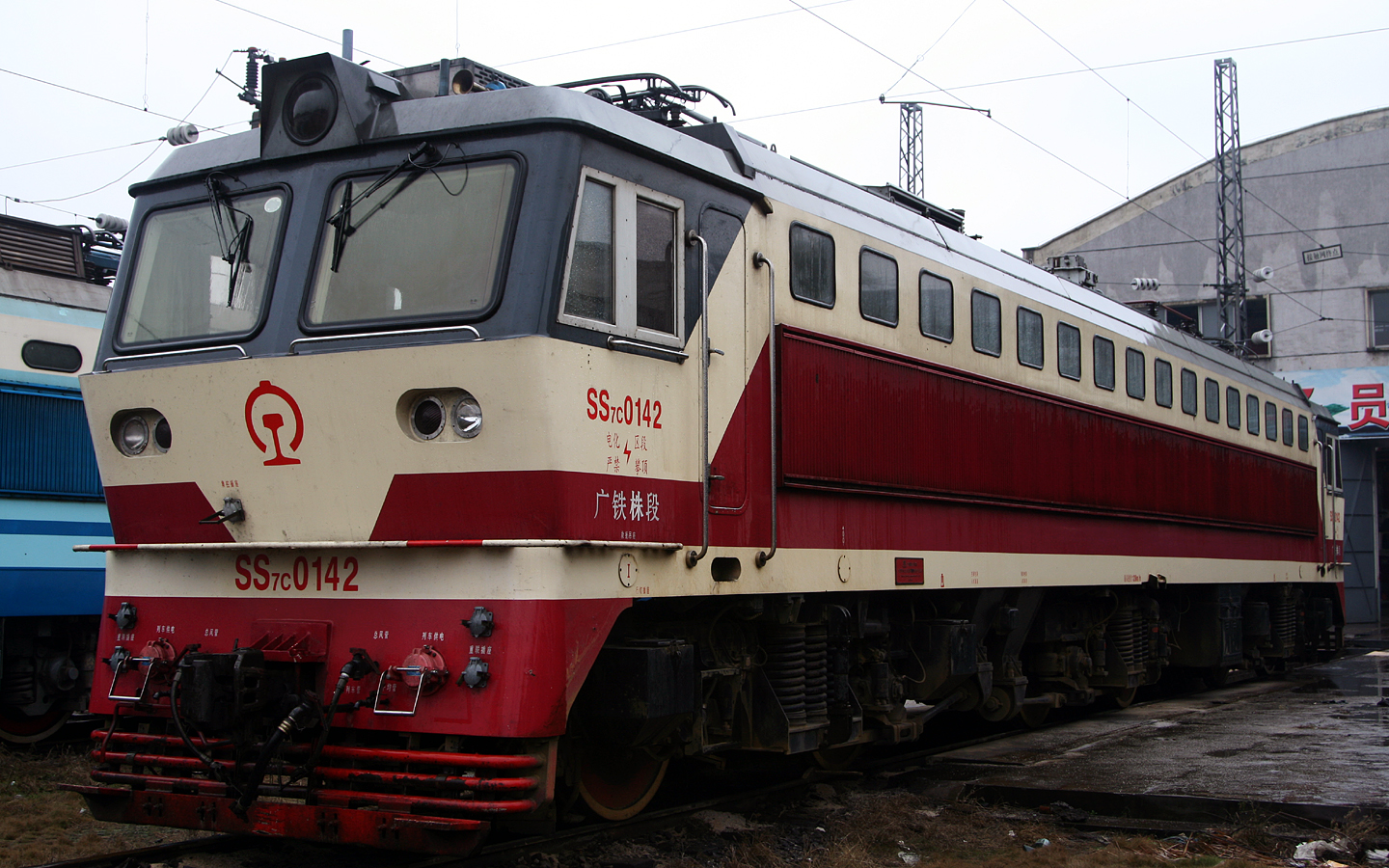
SS7C-0142 locomotive at Wuchangnan Locomotive Depot.

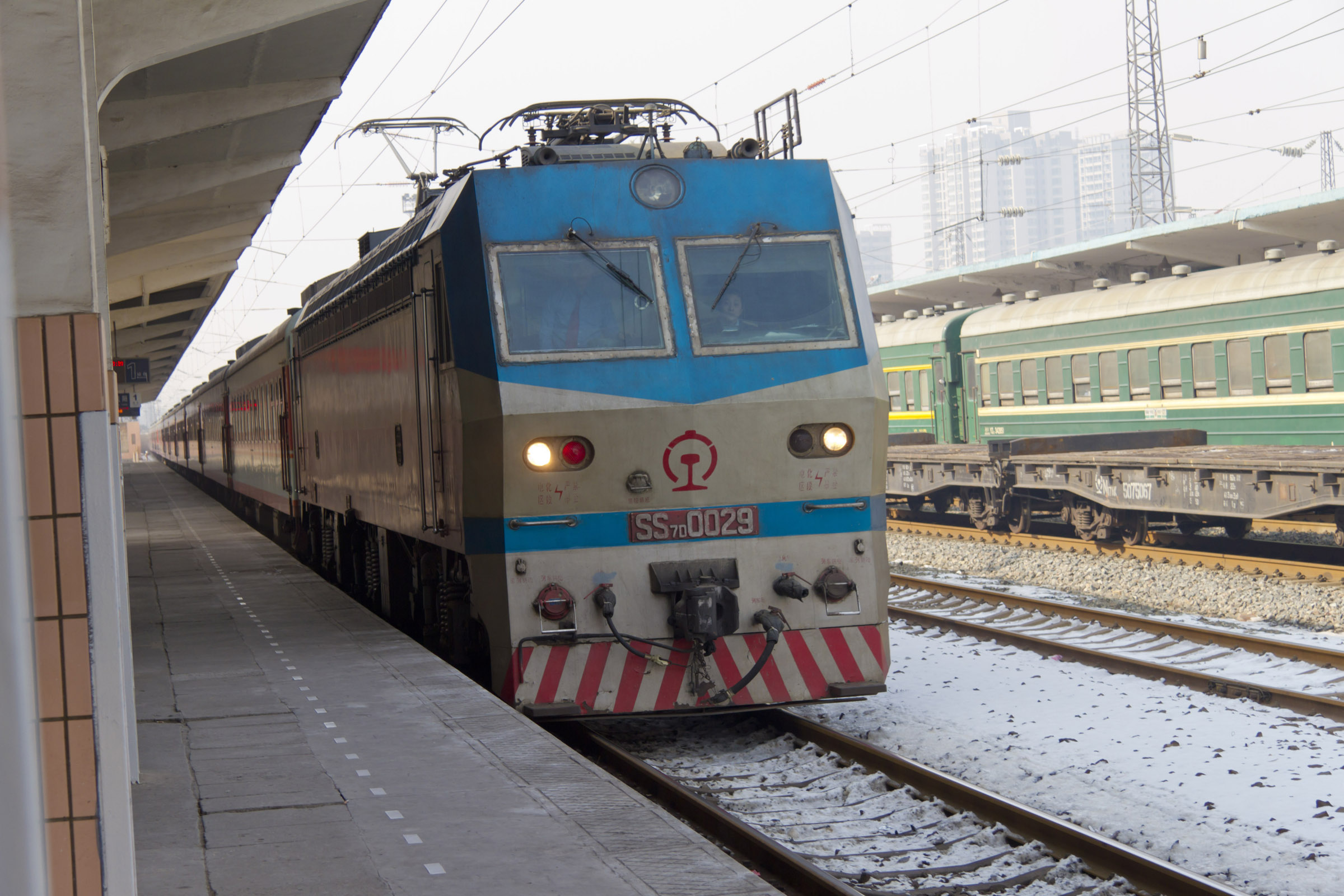
SS7D-0029 in Xianyang railway station.

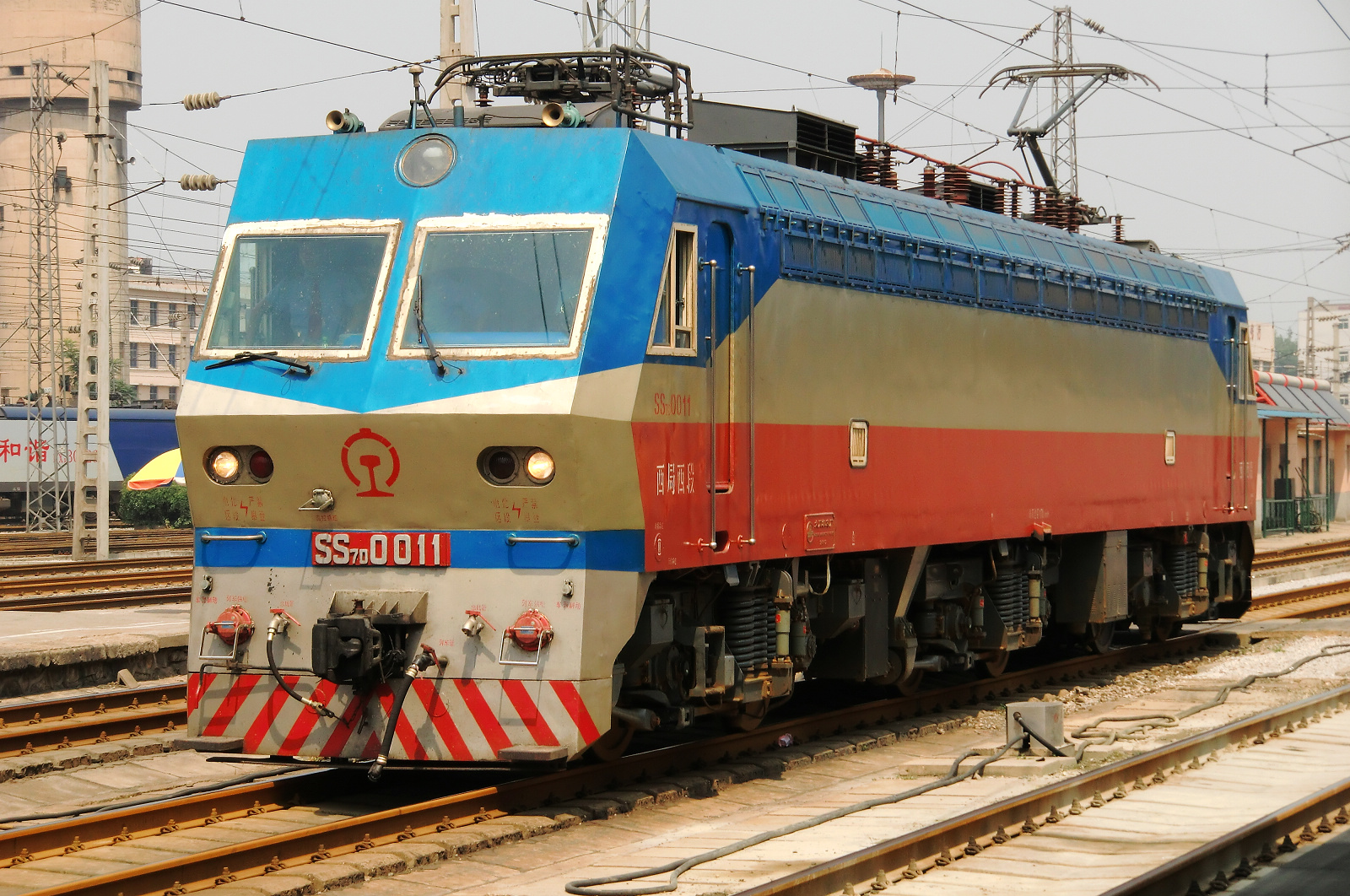
SS7D-0011 in Xi'an railway station

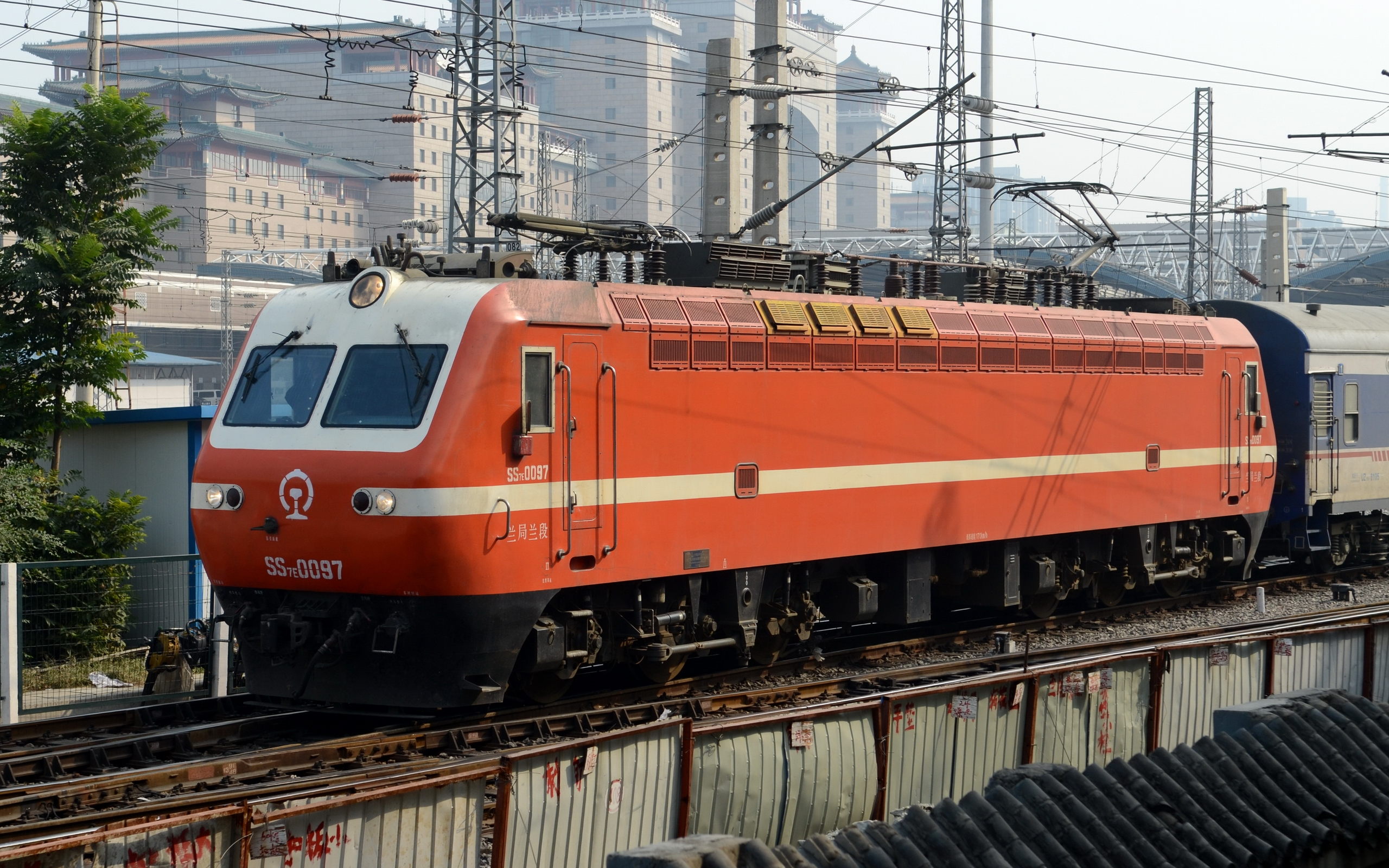
SS7E-0097 in Beijing West railway station.

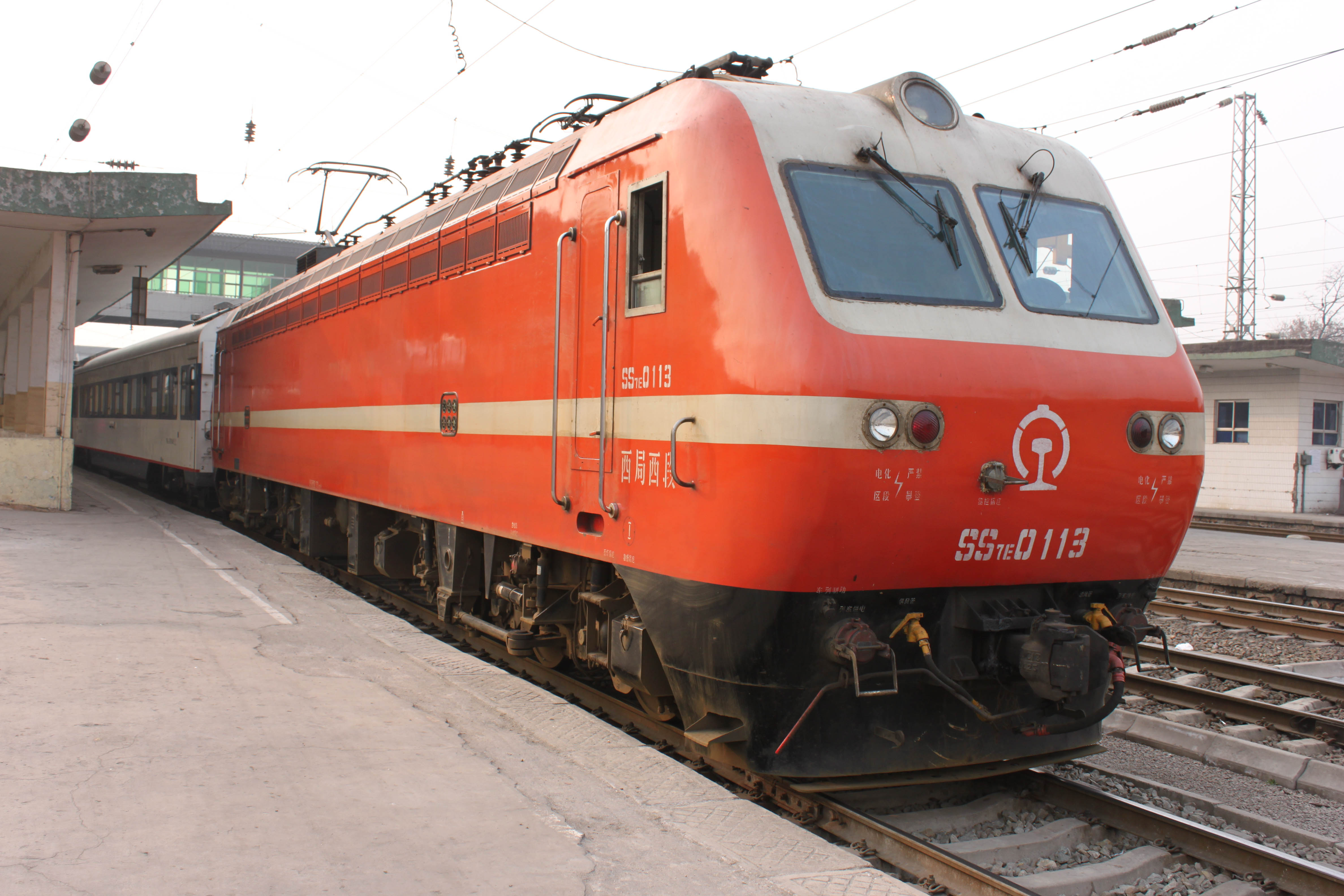
SS7E-0113 in Xi'an railway station

== Manufacturers ==
SS7s have been manufactured by several companies:

- Datong Electric Locomotive Works (Most of SS7s.)
- Dalian Locomotive & Rolling Stock Works (SS7E Electric Locomotive's 7000 Series.)
