= China Railways DF8 =

Chinese diesel-electric locomotive class

Dongfeng 8 东风8
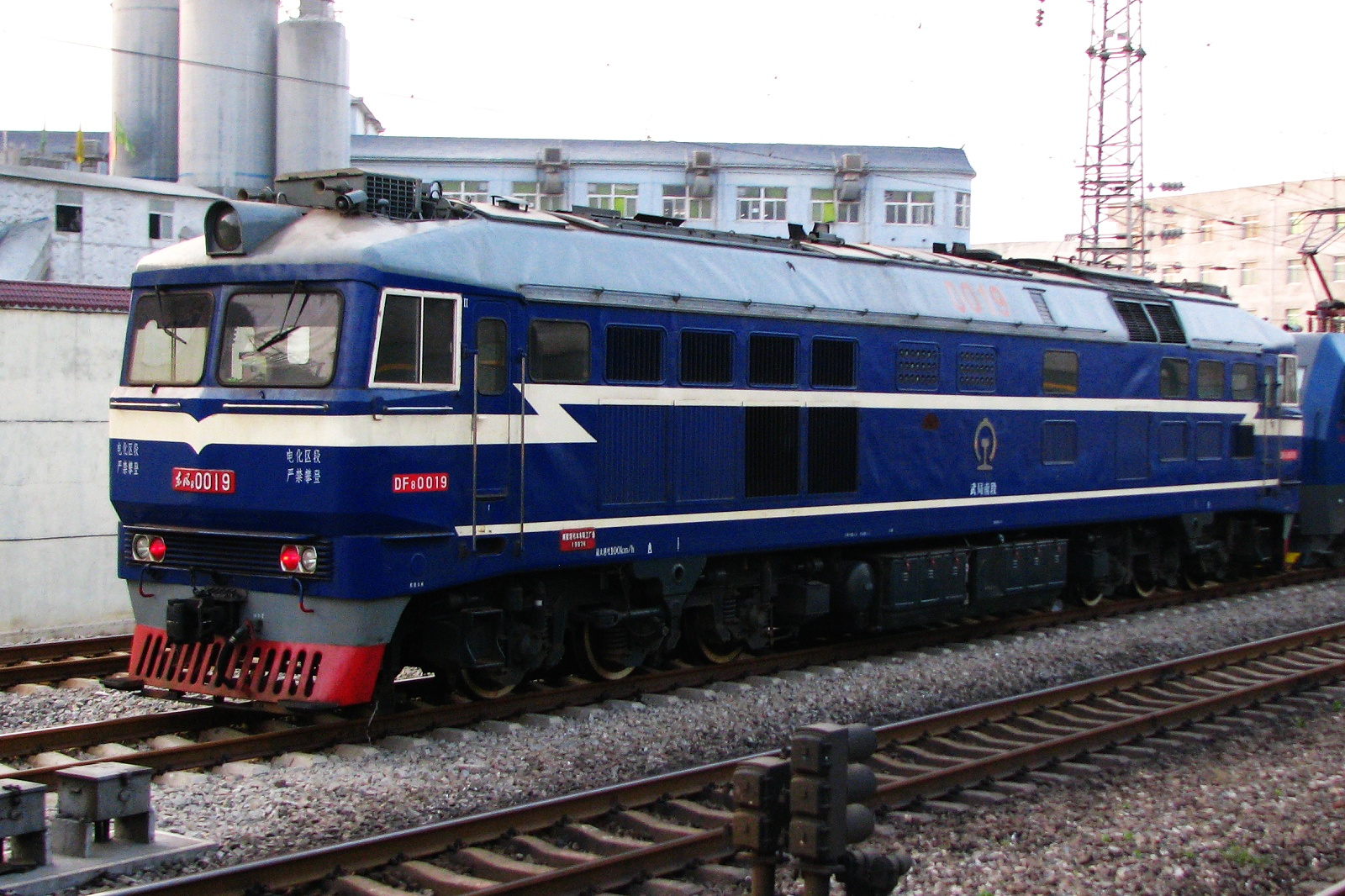
- The first generation of DF8 family, batch-produced hull configuration
Type and origin
- Power type: Diesel-electric
- Builder: CRRC and its predecessors
- Model: DF8, DF8B, DF8BJ, DF8CJ, DF8D, DF8DJ (domestic)
- Build date: 1984-present
- Total produced: DF8: 141; DF8B: 1200+ DF8BJ: 1 DF8CJ: 3 DF8D: 4 DF8DJ: 1
Specifications
- Configuration
  - UIC: Co′Co′
- Gauge: 1,435 mm (4 ft 8 1/2 in) (domestic models)
- Fuel capacity: DF8B plateau type: 8,000 L (2,100 US gal); DF8D: 9,000 L (2,400 US gal); DF8B 5672 (rebuilt DF8DJ): 9,000 L (2,400 US gal) diesel oil, 2,400 L (630 US gal) LNG
- Prime mover: DF8: 16V280ZJ; DF8B: 16V280ZJA; DF8BJ: 16V280ZJG; DF8CJ: 16V280ZJB (R16V280ZJ); DF8D: 12V280ZJ (280/320, not the same series with 16V280ZJ (280/285)); DF8DJ: CAT 3616 (before rebuilt)
- Engine type: V16 diesel engine DF8D: V12; Rebuilt DF8DJ (DF8B-5672): dual-fuel engine (LNG & diesel oil)
- Cylinder size: DF8, DF8B, DF8BJ: 280 mm × 285 mm (11.024 in × 11.220 in) bore x stroke DF8CJ: 280 mm × 300 mm (11.024 in × 11.811 in); DF8D: 280 mm × 320 mm (11.024 in × 12.598 in)
- Transmission: DF8, DF8B, DF8D: Electric (AC-DC); DF8BJ, DF8CJ, DF8DJ: (AC-DC-AC)
- Loco brake: Straight air and dynamic
- Train brakes: Air
Performance figures
- Maximum speed: DF8, DF8B, DF8D: 100 km/h (62 mph); DF8BJ, DF8CJ, DF8DJ: 120 km/h (75 mph)
- Power output: DF8: 3,310 kW (4,440 hp); DF8B: 3,680 kW (4,930 hp); DF8BJ: 4,000 kW (5,400 hp); DF8CJ: 4,410 kW (5,910 hp); DF8D: 3,820 kW (5,120 hp); DF8DJ: 4,800 kW (6,400 hp) (before rebuilt)
- Tractive effort: DF8: 441 kN (99,000 lb_{f}) starting 314 kN (71,000 lb_{f}) continuous DF8B: 441 kN (99,000 lb_{f}) starting 347 kN (78,000 lb_{f}) continuous DF8CJ: 560 kN (130,000 lb_{f}) starting 440 kN (99,000 lb_{f}) continuous DF8D: 480.5 kN (108,000 lb_{f}) starting 363.5 kN (81,700 lb_{f}) continuous
Career
- Operators: China Railways, exported to several other countries
- Locale: People's Republic of China, Kenya, Iran, etc.

The DF8 (Chinese: 东风8) is a type of diesel-electric locomotive used by China Railway in the People's Republic of China. It was in production from 1984 until mid-1990s, with mass production starting in 1989. The revised DF8B is still in production today. DF8 are almost exclusively used for freight services.

== Models ==
=== DF8 ===
The first generation DF8 is powered by the original 3,310 kW (4,440 hp) 16V280ZJ engine, manufactured by Qishuyan Locomotive and Rolling Stock Works. 141 locomotives are produced from 1989 to 1997. The prototype engine DF8-0001&0002 features different hull design with the batch-produced engines.

41 engines (0001-0041, including 2 prototype engines) assigned to South Wuchang Locomotive Depot, China Railway Wuhan Group, 100 engines assigned to Mudanjiang Locomotive Depot, China Railway Harbin Group.

=== DF8B ===
The second generation, DF8B, is powered by an updated 16V280ZJA engine with 3,680 kW (4,930 hp), whose production started in 1997. Qishuyan manufactured 0 series, while Ziyang Locomotive Works manufactured 5000 series.

==== 7000 series version ====
In 2000, Qishuyan built a DF8B with radial bogies numbered DF8B-7001. As an experimental locomotive there was only one produced. Now it is owned by Liuzhou Locomotive Depot, Nanning Railway Bureau.

==== 9000 series version ====
Qishuyan built a few DF8Bs originally for Qingzang Railway, however they were unsuccessful. They were numbered DF8B-9001 and 9002. In 2006, in order to cope with the situation that the NJ2 locomotives had not fully arrived when Qingzang Railway began to be fully operational, the Ministry of Railways still ordered 10 DF8Bs, numbered 9003~9012. In 2015, Qinghai Local Railway Construction Investment Co., Ltd. (青海地方铁路建设投资有限公司) separately ordered 5 units for the operation of Xitieshan-North Hulsan Lake Railway, numbered 9013~9017.

==== Other versions and related models ====
A variant of DF8B has been designed for use in Jamaica by Qishuyan.

12 CKD4Cs were exported to Venezuela and are called DF8Bven, however they are generally identical to the domestically used DF8B.

A variant of DF8B has been designed for Mombasa-Nairobi railway in Kenya.

A variant of DF8B, DF8BI, has been designed for use in Iran. There is another model SDD21 designed for Iran, equipped with a 12V280ZJ engine.

A variant of DF8B, CKD9A, has been designed for use in Turkmenistan.

A variant of DF8B, SDD16, has been designed for use in Guinea.

There is a model SDD17 with 12V280ZJ prime mover, used in Saudi Arabia.

There is a model SDD19 with 6280ZJ prime mover, used in Uzbekistan.

Passenger models DF9 and DF11 series use the same 16V280ZJA prime mover as DF8B.

Taeyangho armoured train used by the North Korean leaders is a variant of DF8.

=== DF8BJ ===
The DF8BJ, which uses the 16V280ZJG engine (4,000 kW or 5,400 hp), GTO VVVF inverter and AC traction motors, was produced by Ziyang. It was designed for Qingzang Railway.

=== DF8CJ ===
The DF8CJ is produced by Qishuyan. It was equipped with a 16V280ZJB (R16V280ZJ) engine (maximum power 4.4 MW or 5,900 hp) and AC traction motors.

Later passenger model HXN5K, freight model HXN5B and FXN5C use a 12-cylinder version (R12V280ZJ) prime mover.

=== DF8DJ ===
Ziyang made a special DF8B which was originally intended to be used on the Qingzang line and was numbered DF8DJ-0001. The DF8DJ version has a Caterpillar 3616 engine of rated power 5.08 MW (6,810 hp) and AC asynchronous traction motors and its service power is 4.8 MW (6,400 hp). The Chinese Ministry of Railways rejected the proposal and it was renumbered DF8B-5672. It's now running on Xiyan Line in Shaanxi and has been remodified with dual-fuel engine (LNG & diesel oil).

== Gallery ==
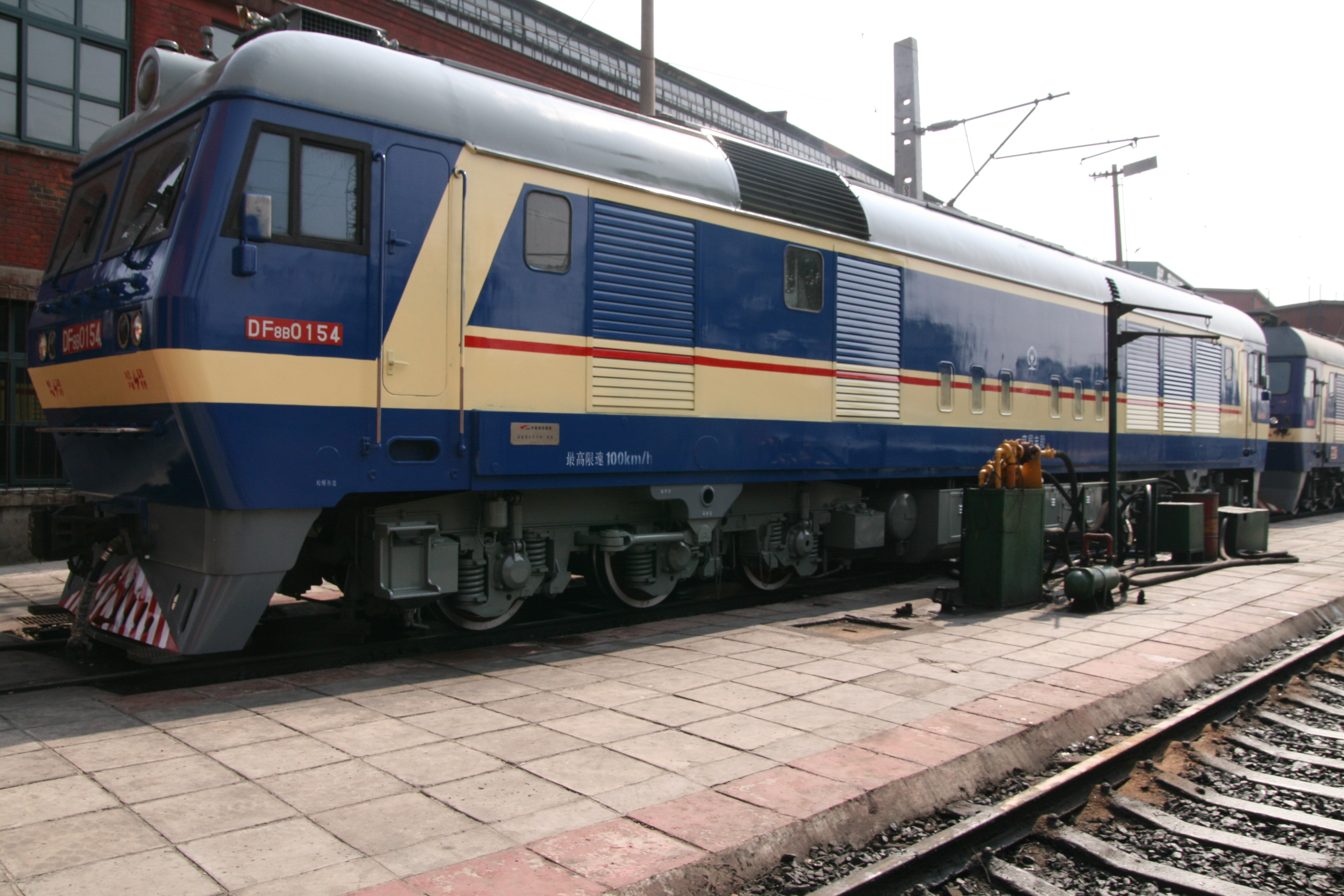
DF8B-0154 at Fengtai Locomotive Depot, Beijing Railway Bureau.

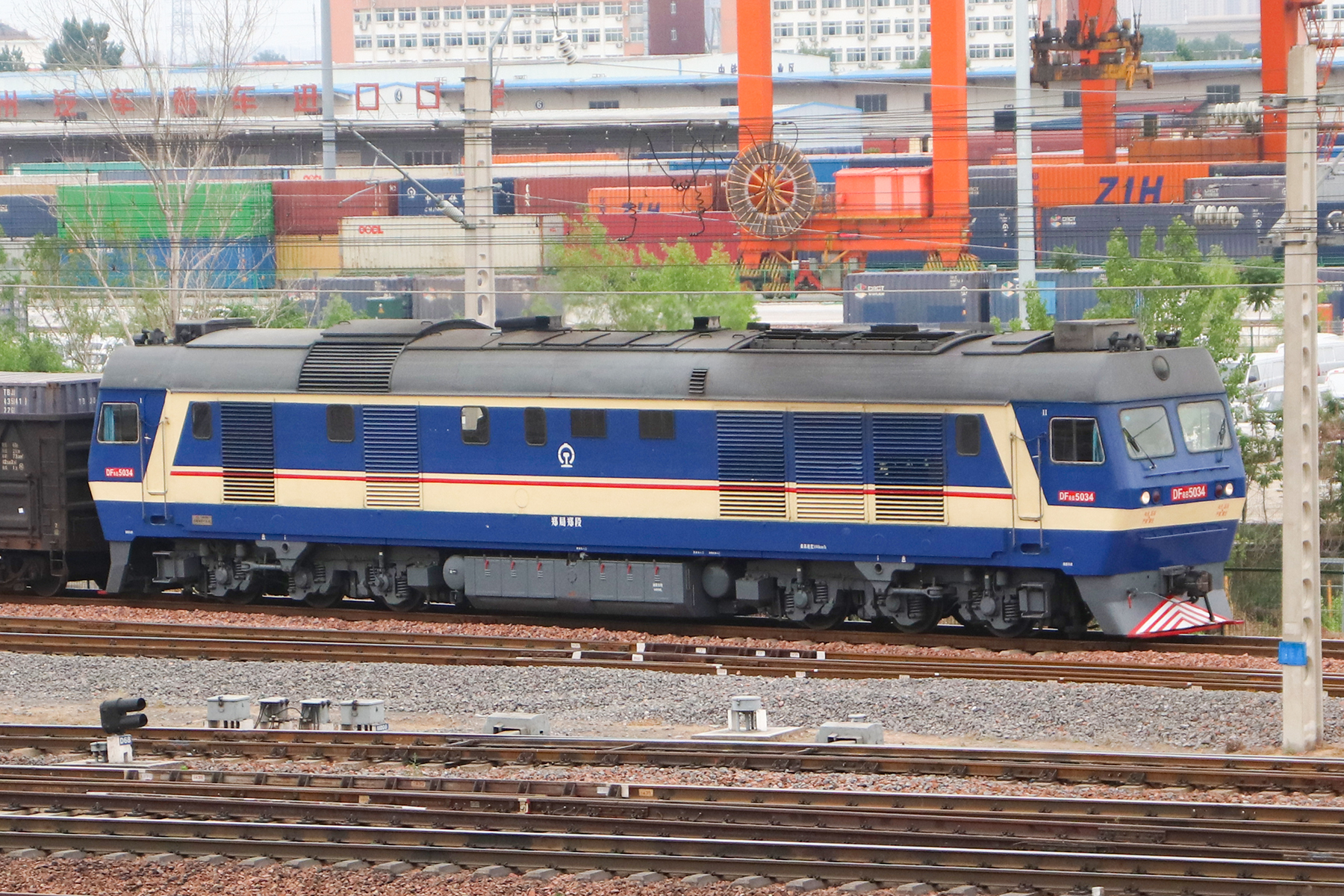
DF8B-5034

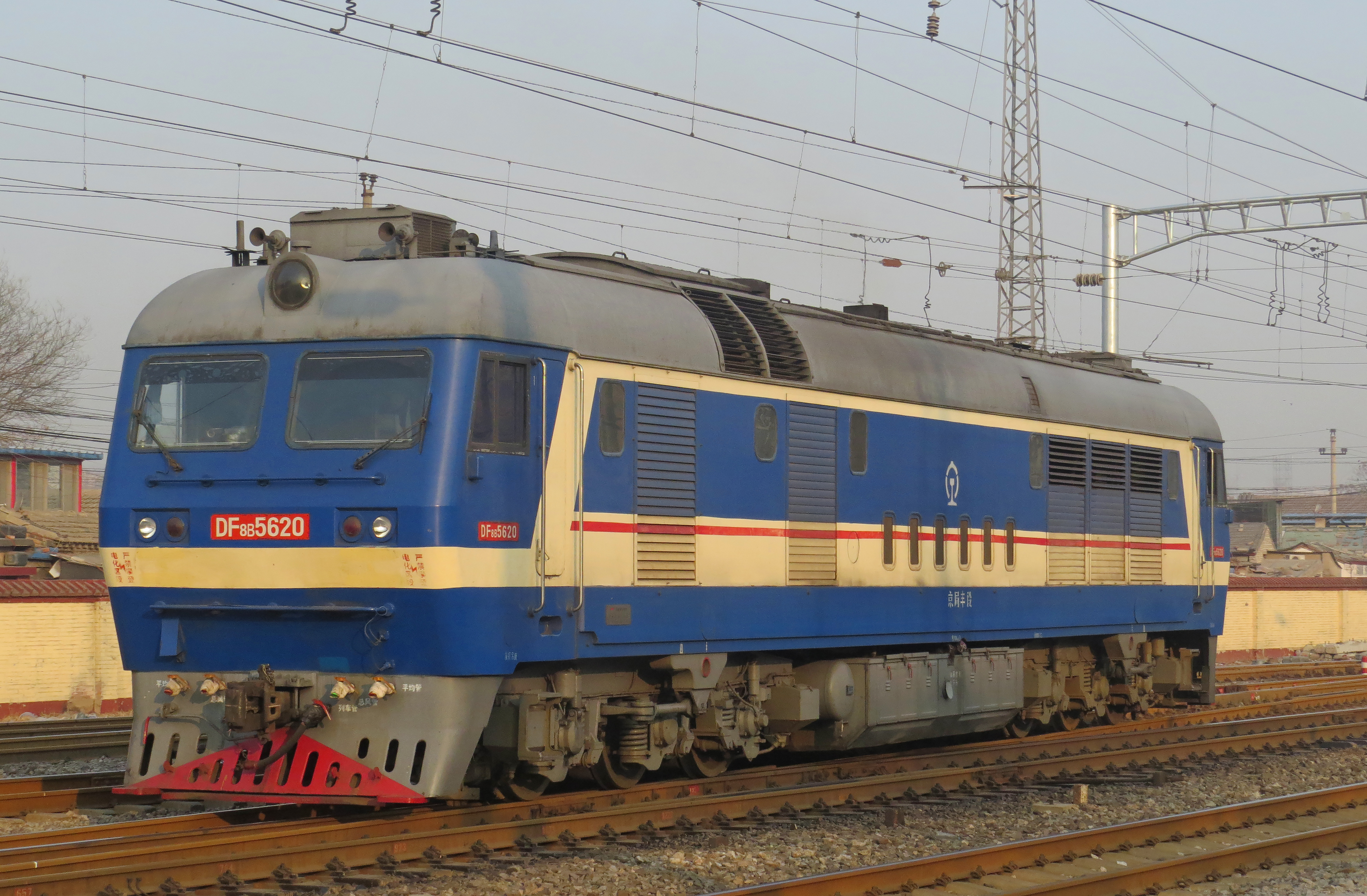
DF8B-5620

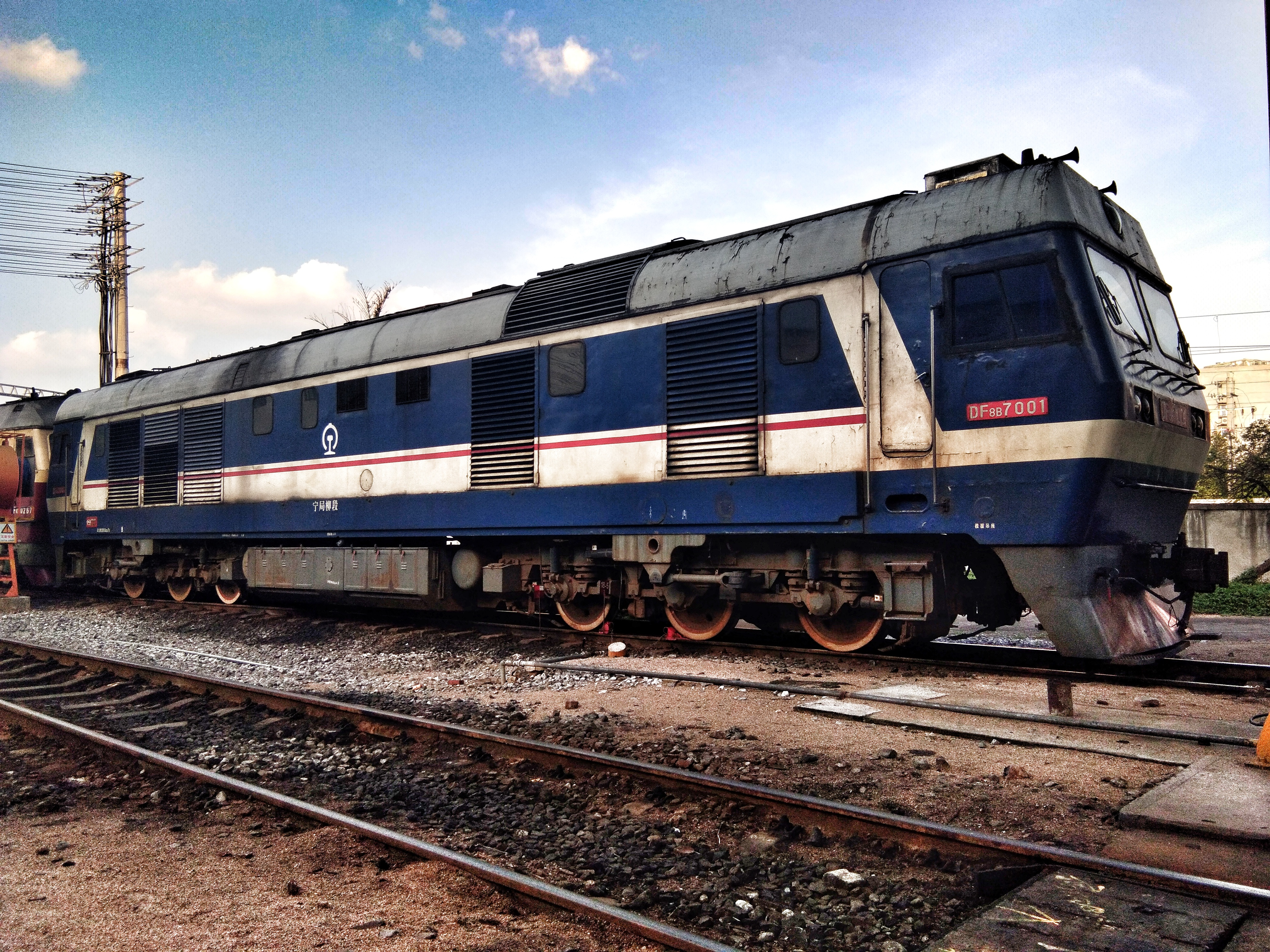
DF8B-7001 in Liuzhou Locomotive Depot which use two radial bogies.

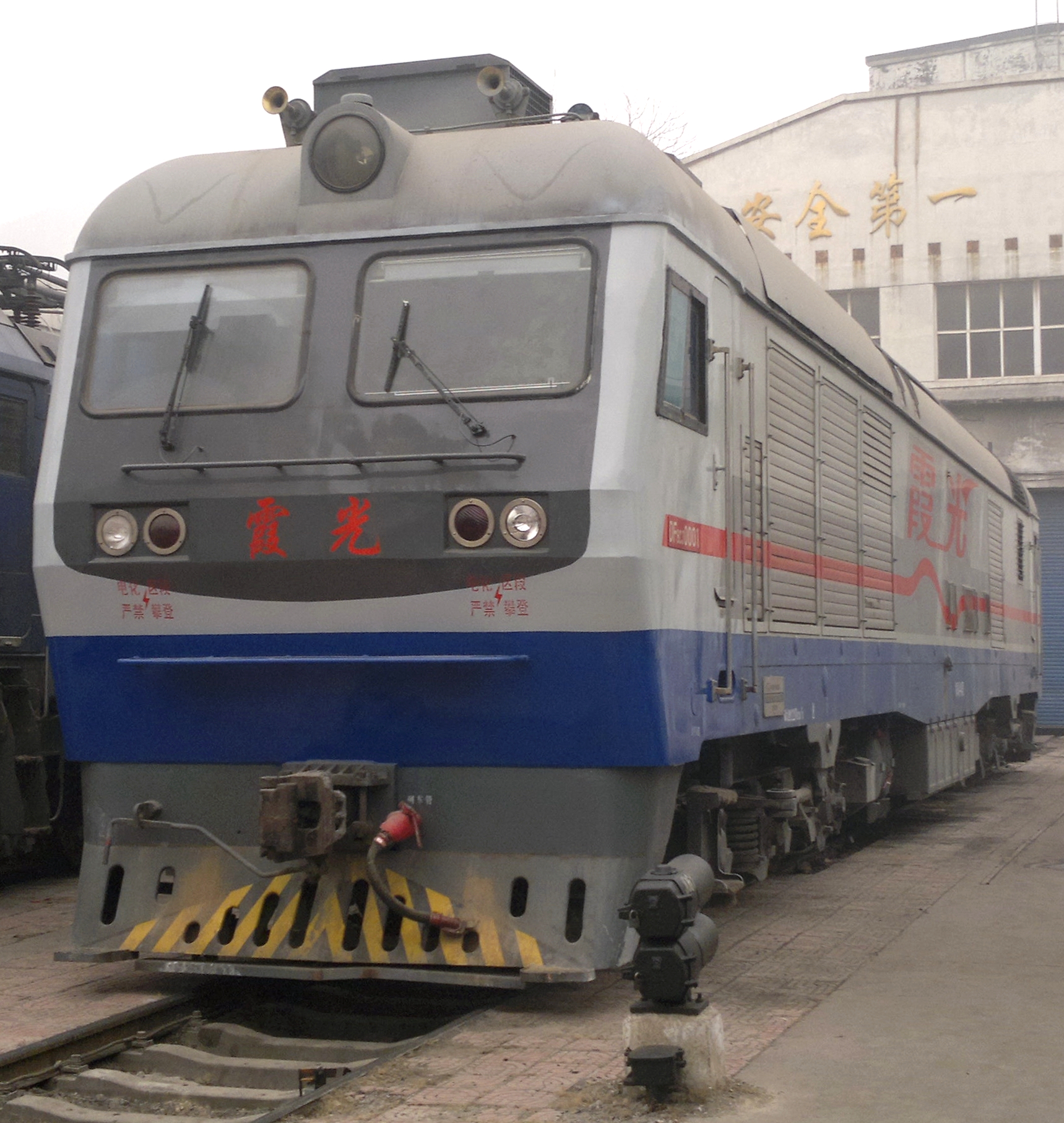
DF8CJ-0001 at Xinxiang Locomotive Depot, China Railway Zhengzhou Group

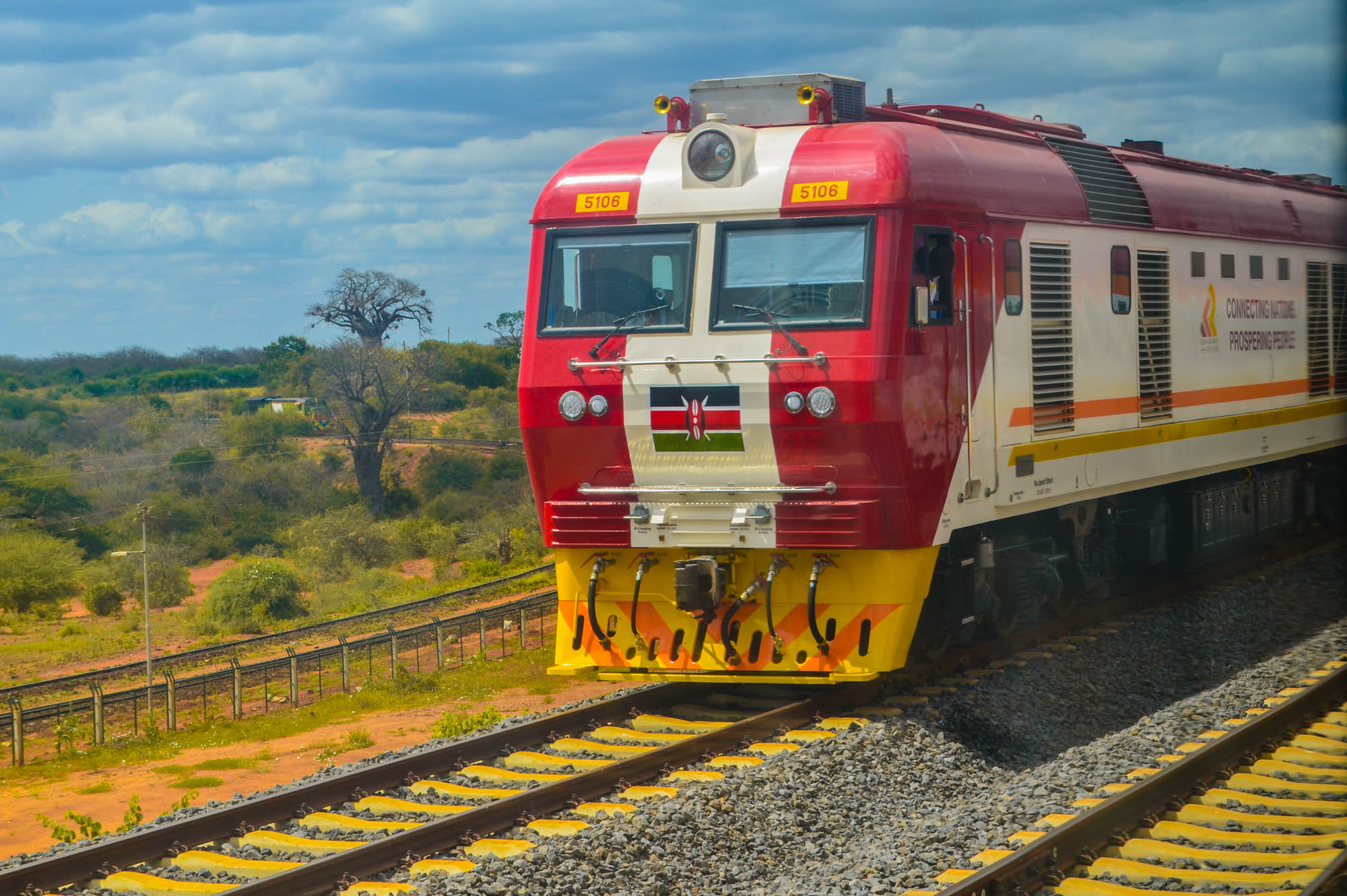
DF8B used by Kenya Standard Gauge Railway

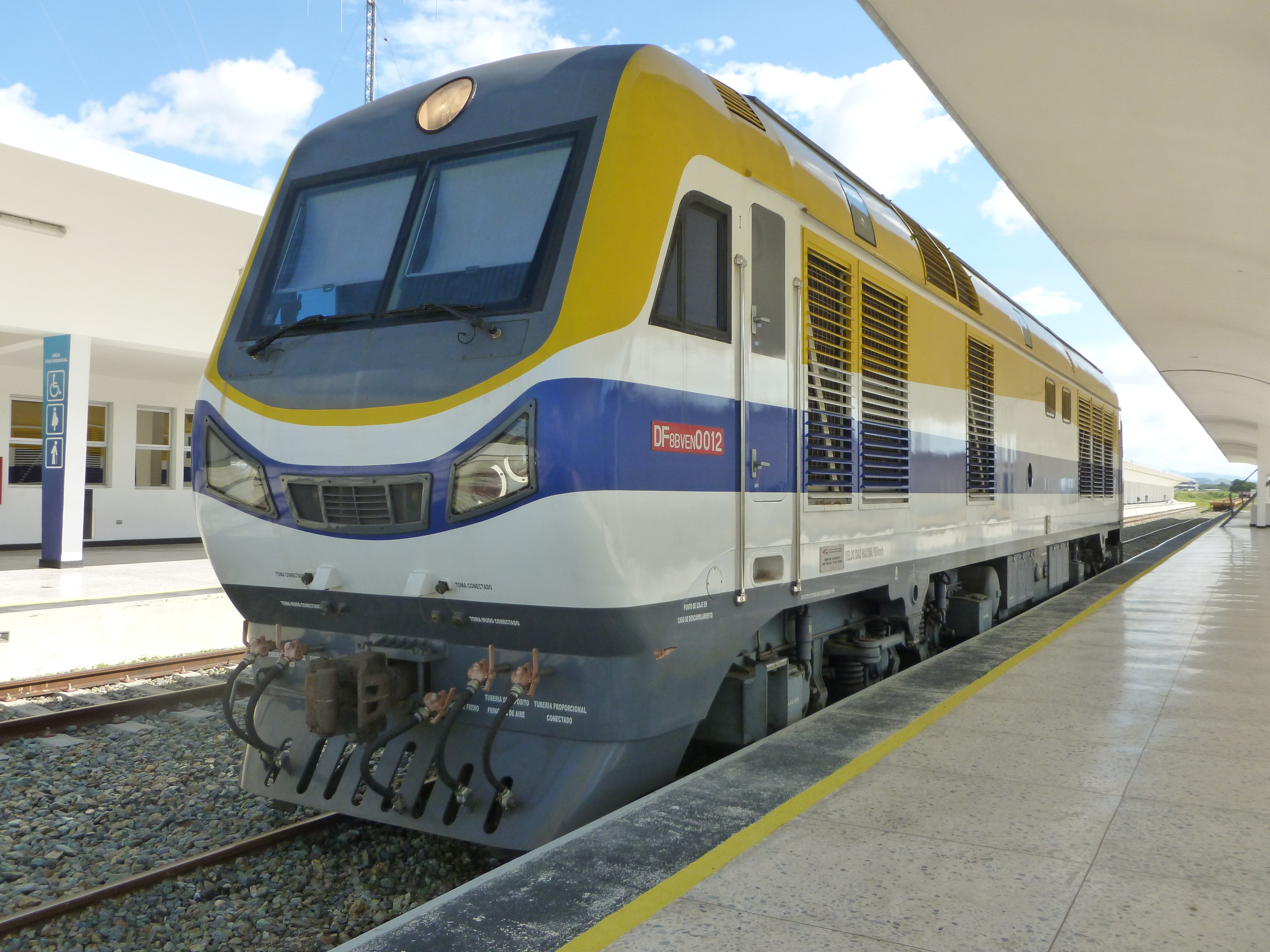
A DF8Bven of Venezuelan IFE.

== Preservation ==
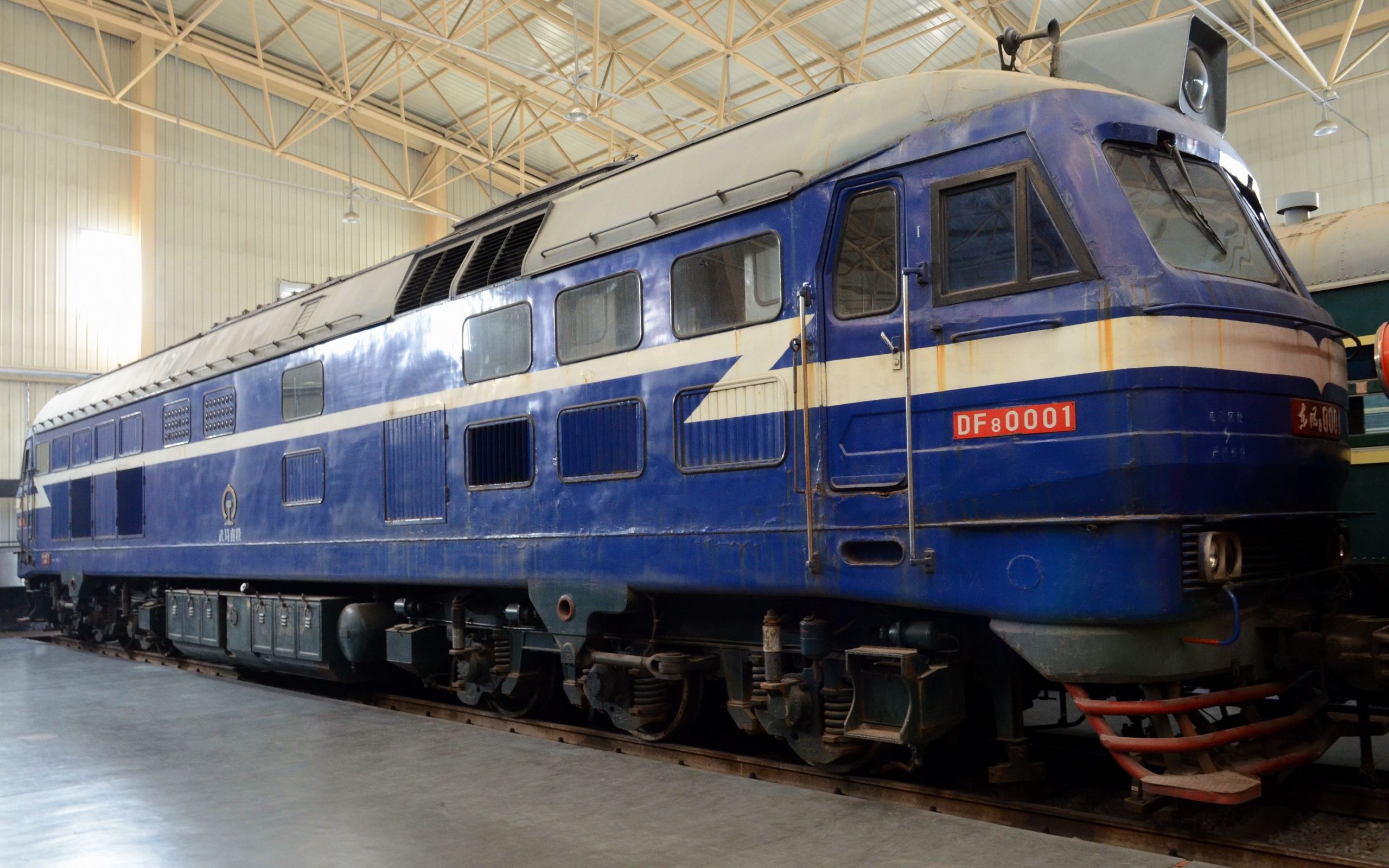
DF8-0001 at the China Railway Museum.

- DF8-0001: preserved at China Railway Museum
- DF8-0092: preserved at Shenyang Railway Museum
- DF8-0089: on display at Mudanjiang Locomotive Depot

== See also ==
- Iranian locomotives
- EMD DDA40X
- List of locomotives in China
- China Railways DF11
- China Railways DF11G
