= China Railways DF9 =

Class of Chinese diesel locomotives

Dongfeng 9 东风9
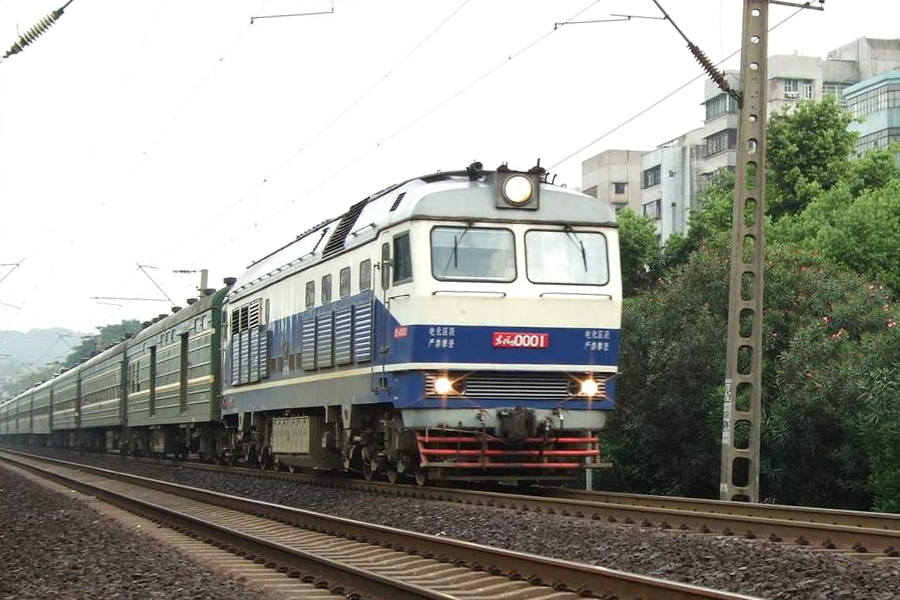
- DF9 0001 hauling a passenger train, 2008
Type and origin
- Power type: Diesel-electric
- Builder: Qishuyan Locomotive and Rolling Stock Works
- Build date: 1990–1991
- Total produced: 2
Specifications
- Configuration
  - UIC: Co′Co′
- Gauge: 1,435 mm (4 ft 8 1/2 in)
- Length: 20,150 mm (66 ft 1 in)
- Width: 3,288 mm (10 ft 9.4 in)
- Height: 4,736 mm (15 ft 6.5 in)
- Axle load: 23 t (51,000 lb)
- Loco weight: 138 t (304,000 lb)
- Fuel type: Diesel
- Fuel capacity: 6,500 L (1,700 US gal)
- Water cap.: 1,200 L (320 US gal)
- Prime mover: 16V280ZJA
- Generator: TQFR-3000C-1
- Traction motors: ZD106
- Transmission: Electric (AC/DC)
Performance figures
- Maximum speed: 140 km/h (87 mph) (0001); 160 km/h (99 mph) (0002)
- Power output: 3,040 kW (4,080 hp)
- Tractive effort
  - Starting: 245 kN (55,000 lbf)
  - Continuous: 179.1 kN (40,300 lbf) (0001); 161.3 kN (36,300 lbf) (0002)
Career
- Operators: China Railway
- Scrapped: 2011

The DF9 (Chinese: 东风9) was the first Chinese semi-high-speed diesel locomotive with a top speed of 160 km/h (99.4 mph), which was successfully developed by Qishuyan Locomotive and Rolling Stock Works in 1990. As part of China's Eighth Five-Year Plan scientific and technological project, the DF9 diesel locomotive adopts wheel-to-hollow shaft traction motor full suspension drive system, high-flexibility second-series round springs, lightweight body and other technologies. Although the only two DF9s produced were scrapped in 2011, it laid the foundation for the development of DF11 diesel locomotives.

== History ==
=== Background and development ===
China Railway saw an increase in passenger traffic volumes on its trunk routes by the 1990s. It was decided to upgrade the main lines within the 1,500 km (930 mi) radius from Beijing to 140 km/h (87 mph) operation. To achieve the projected 15 hour journey time, a high-speed diesel locomotive was to be developed. From May to June 1987, bids were submitted by Beijing Feb. 7th Locomotive Co., Dalian Locomotive and Rolling Stock Works, Qingdao Sifang Co., Ltd., Ziyang Co., Ltd. and Qishuyan Locomotive and Rolling Stock Works, with the latter being selected by the Ministry of Railways in July 1987 to construct the locomotives.

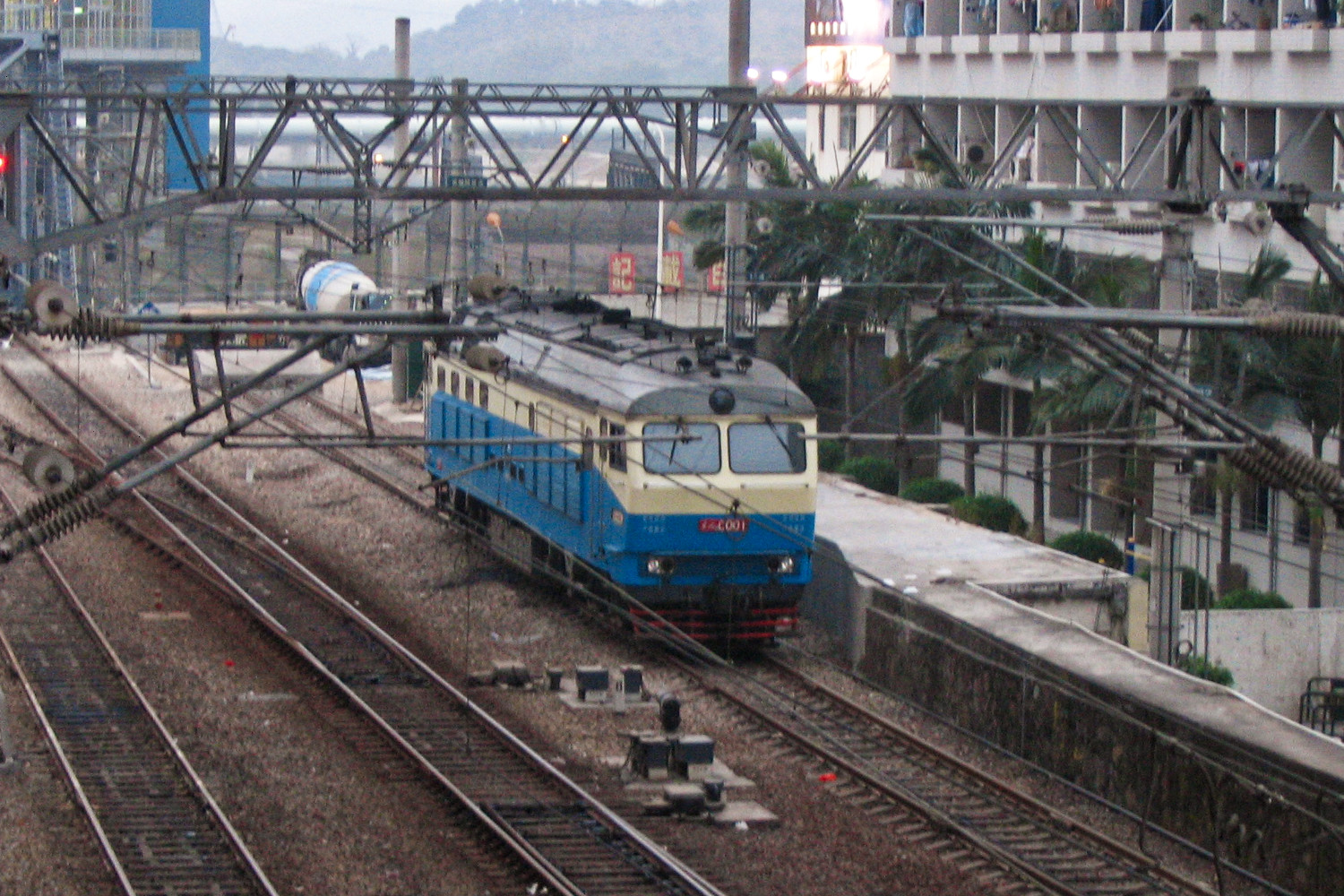
DF9 0001 in Shenzhen railway station

In 1991, Qishuyan unveiled the DF9, and in that February, number 0001 was allocated to Zhengzhou Locomotive Depot for a 30,000 km (19,000 mi) endurance trial between Zhengzhou and Wuchang on the Beijing-Guangzhou Railway.

=== High-speed trials ===
In the late 1980s, China Railway faced competition from other modes of transport, so they sought to increase train speeds. The Ministry of Railways first decided to upgrade the existing Guangzhou-Shenzhen Railway to 160 km/h (99 mph) operation, in order to gain experience in developing high-speed railways.

On 29 March 1992, DF9 0002, the second locomotive produced, was sent to the Beijing Ring Railway, where extreme wind conditions occurred before the tests. While the locomotive reached 160 km/h (99 mph) during trials, setting a new rail speed record in China, one of its brake pipes failed due to the wind pressure of 600–800 kPa (87–116 psi). In the following 15 days, the DF9 conducted gradual acceleration tests, eventually being pushed to 170 km/h (110 mph) on another speed test.

=== Service history ===
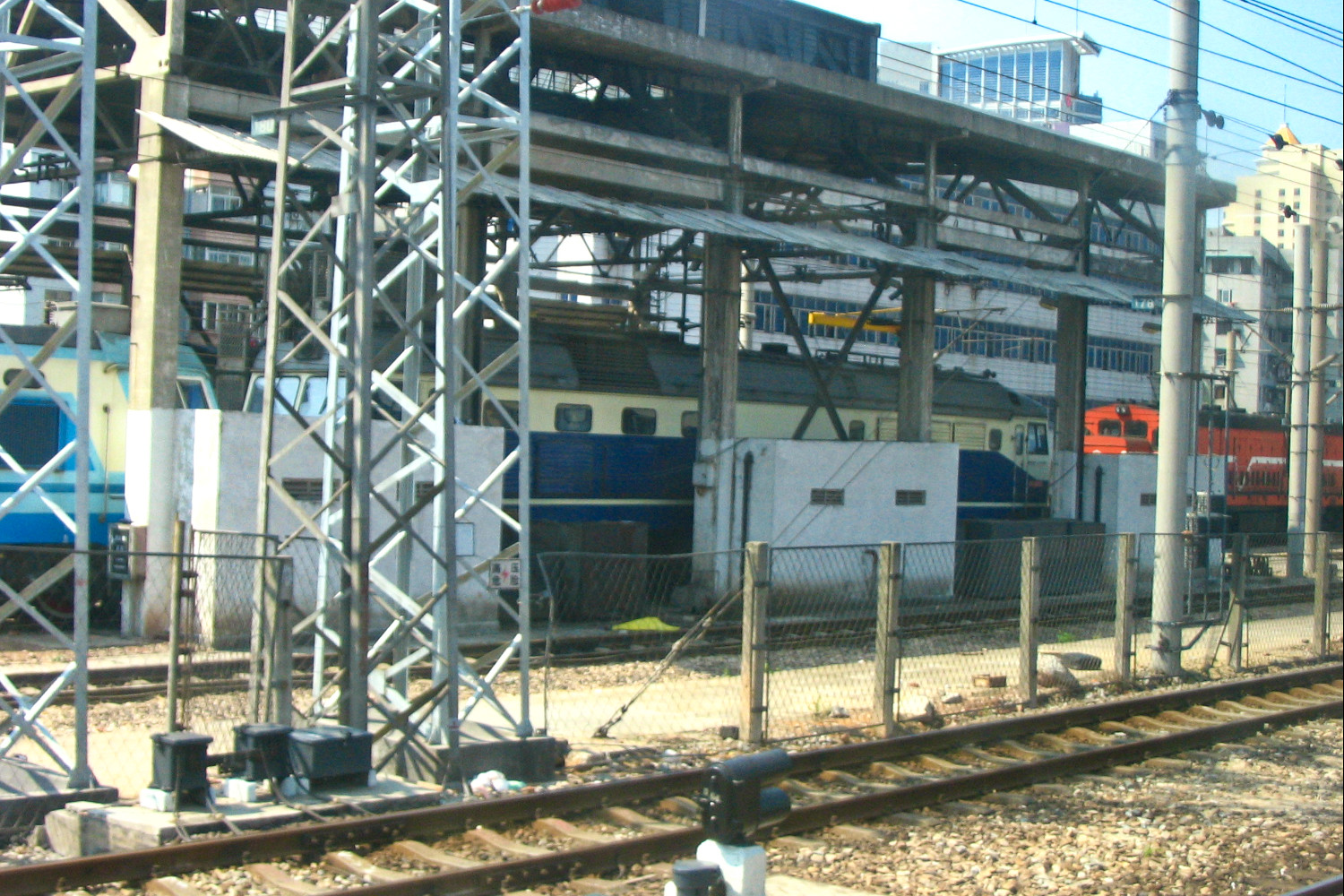
DF9 in Guangzhou

Although the DF9, as an experimental class, was never put into serial production, Qishuyan would go on to develop the design into the DF11 in 1993. In 2005, both DF9s were returned to Qishuyan for overhaul, where they would receive several modifications. These included a standardised oil and water piping arrangement, replacement of the original aluminum intercooler with a copper one, modified cabs with air-conditioning and ventilation, and other features present on the DF11s. After overhaul, both locomotives performed similarly to the DF11s.

In the second half of 2010, DF9 0001 was placed into storage at Guangzhou Locomotive Depot, followed by 0002 in the same year. In December 2010, both locomotives were sold through online bidding, and were scrapped in May 2011.

== See also ==
- List of locomotives in China
- China Railways DF8
- China Railways DF11
- Guangzhou–Shenzhen railway
