= CRRC Qishuyan =

Chinese diesel locomotive manufacturer

CRRC Qishuyan Co., Ltd.
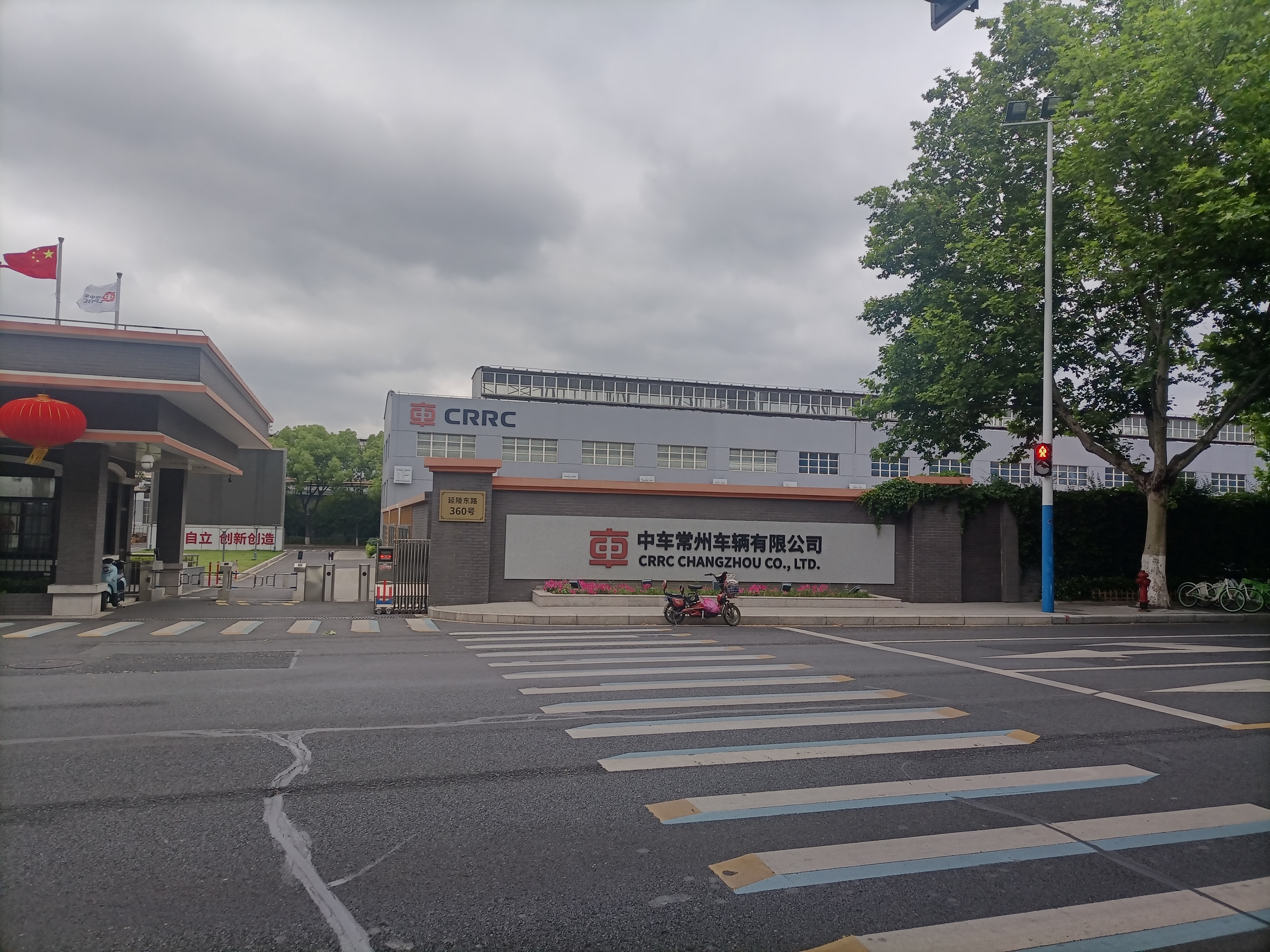
- Native name: 中车戚墅堰机车有限公司
- Type: Subsidiary
- Industry: Locomotive and rolling stock manufacturing
- Predecessor: Qishuyan Lomocomotive Works Locomotive Co., Ltd. (2005)
- Founded: 1905
- Headquarters: Qishuyan, Changzhou city, Jiangsu Province, China
- Owner: majority state owned via CRRC
- Parent: CRRC
- Website: crrcgc.cc/qsyen

CRRC Qishuyan Co., Ltd. (Chinese: 中车戚墅堰机车有限公司; lit. 'CRRC Qishuyan Locomotive Co.', 'Ltd.') is one of the major diesel locomotive manufacturers in China. It one of the subsidiary companies of CRRC Limited.

== History ==
Qishuyan Locomotive Works was founded in 1905.

In Qishuyan Locomotive Works was formed into CSR Group Locomotive Co., Ltd. (as part of the China South Locomotive and Rolling Stock Industry (Group) Corporation CSRG). In December 2007 it was renamed CSR Qishuyan Locomotive Co., Ltd.

== List of locomotives ==
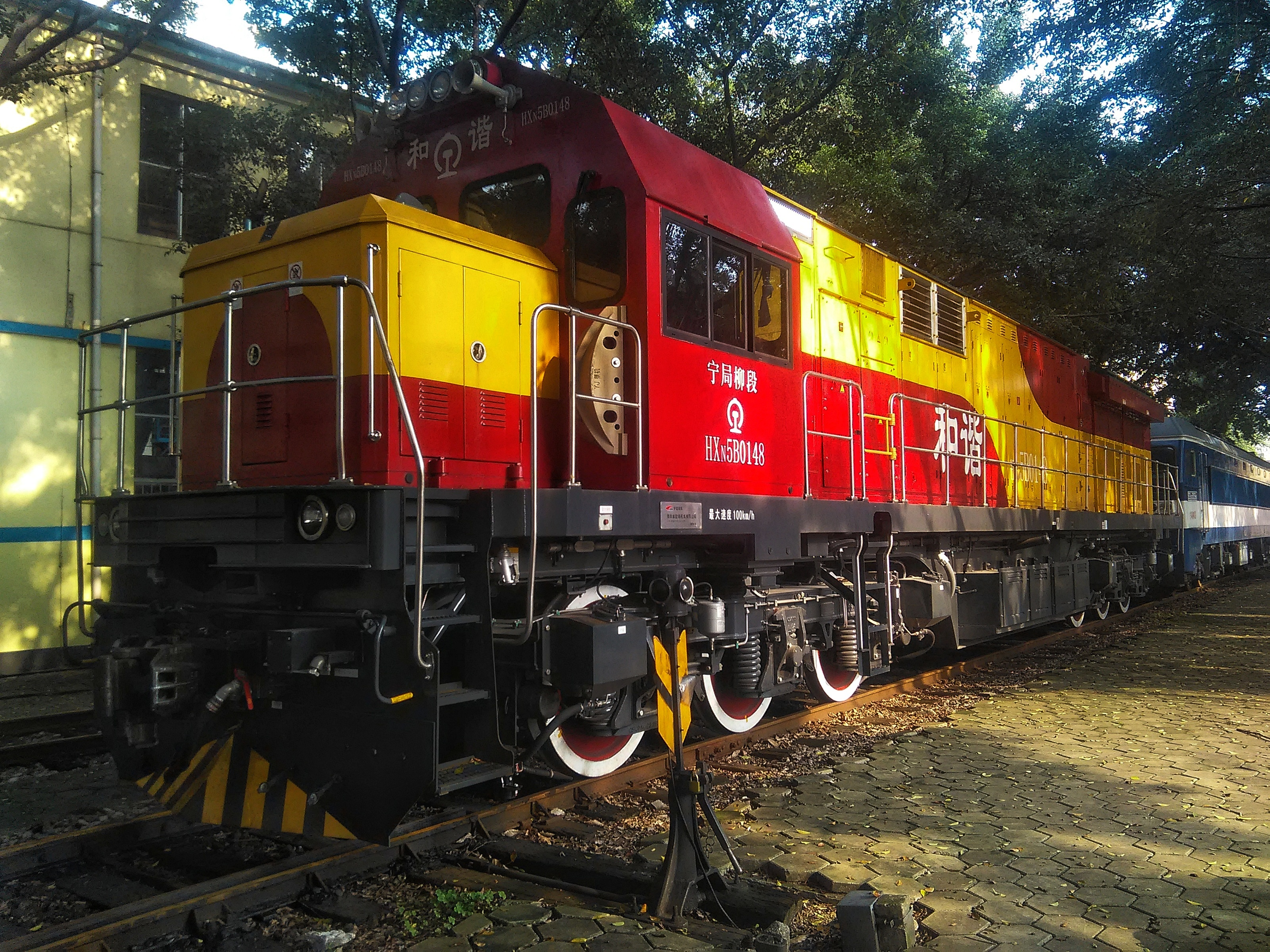
A HXN5B diesel locomotive at Liuzhou Locomotive Depot in 2016.

- China Railways JS
- China Railways DF
- China Railways DF2
- China Railways DF8
- China Railways DF9
- China Railways DF11
- China Railways DF11G
- China Railway NDJ3
- China Railways HXN5
- China Railways HXN5B
