= Liuzhou Locomotive Depot =

Railway depot in Liuzhou, Guangxi, China

The Liuzhou Locomotive Depot (Chinese:柳州机务段) is a locomotive depot that belongs to the Nanning Railway Bureau. It is located in Liuzhou and was founded in 1942.

== Equipped models ==
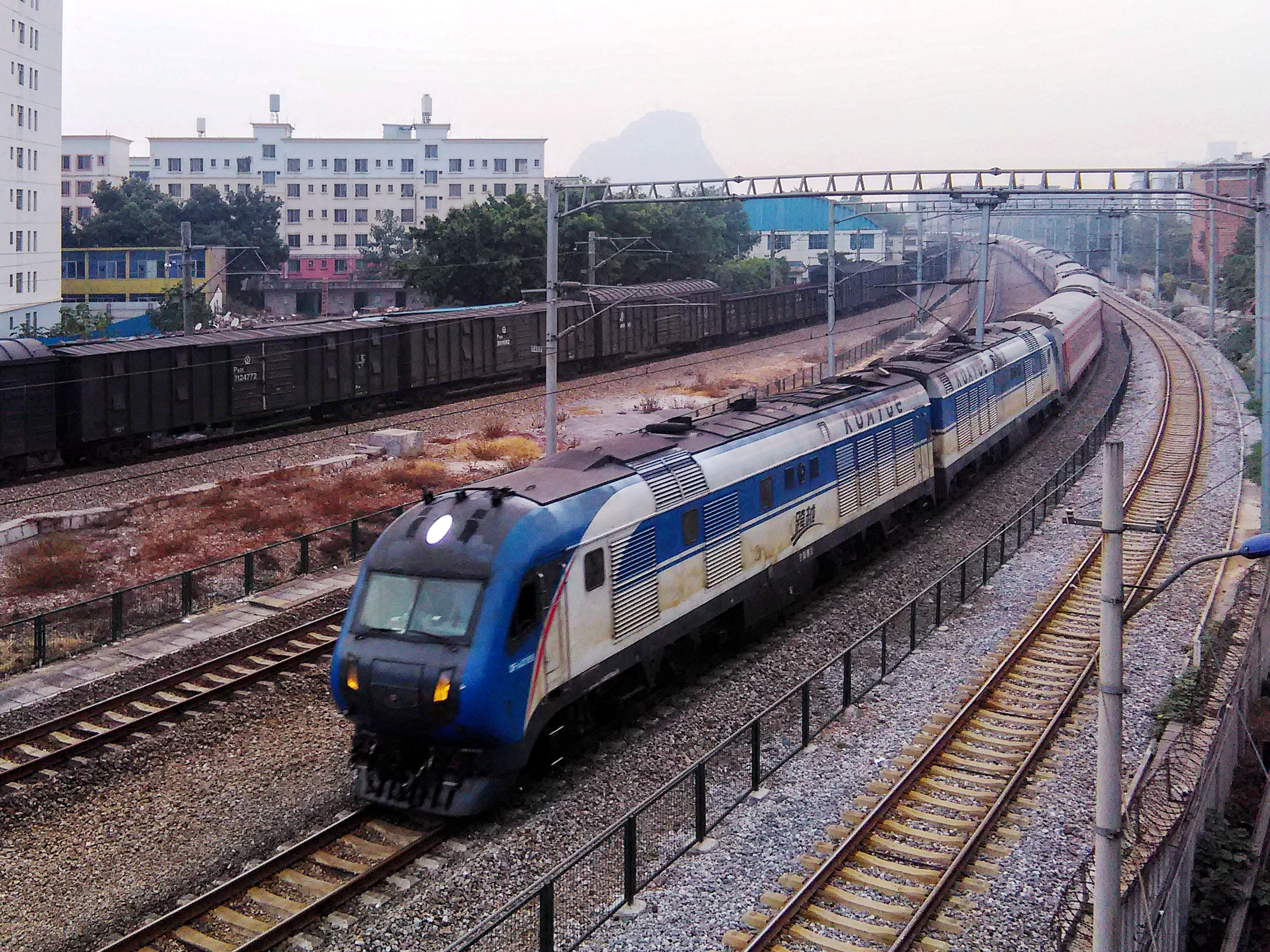
Liuzhou Locomotive Depot's DF11G 0189&0190 is towing K457 Express Passenger Train at Liuzhou-Nanning Intercity Railway.

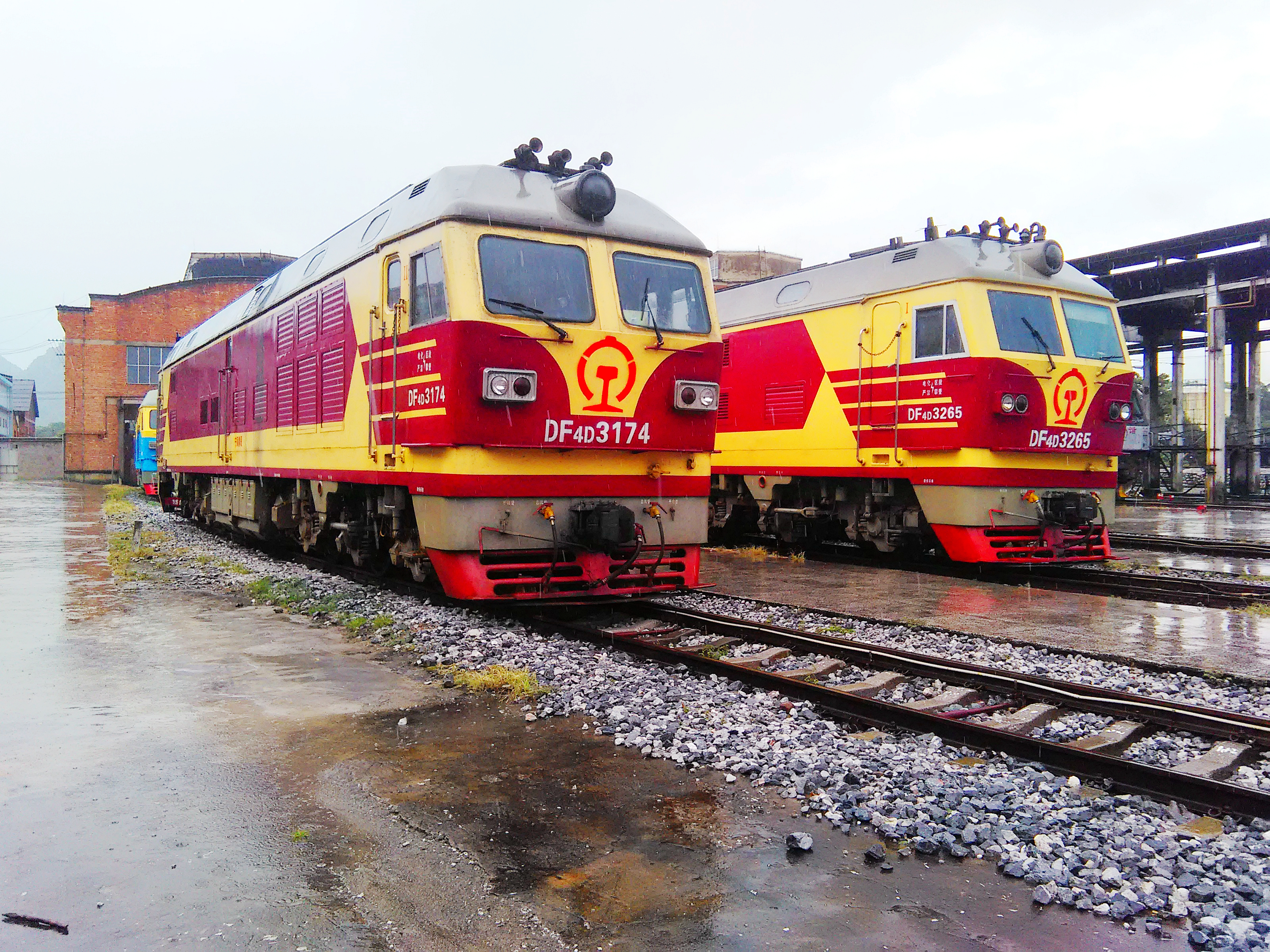
DF4D 3174 & DF4D 3265 in Guilin Locomotive Area.

- China Railways DF4B
- China Railways DF4D(0000 Series and 3000 Series)
- China Railways DF5
- China Railways DF7G(0000 Series)
- China Railways DF8B
- China Railways DF11G
- China Railways GKD1
- China Railways HXN5B
- China Railways SS3
- China Railways SS3B
- China Railways SS7
- China Railways HXD3C

== Dominated models ==
- China Railways DF4C
- China Railways DF4D(4000 Series and 7000 Series)
- China Railways HXD1D
- China Railways HXD3D

== Retired models ==
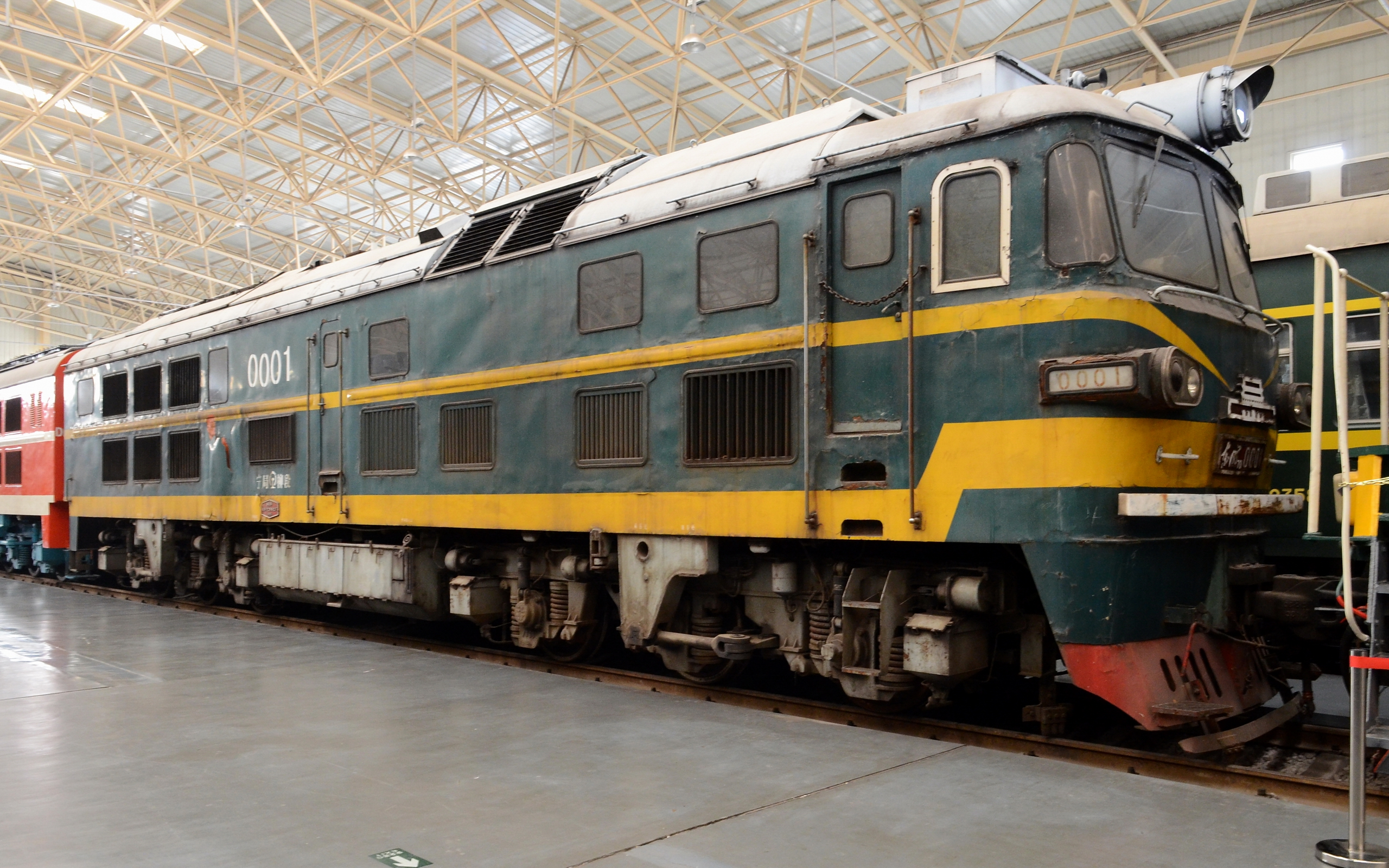
DF7D 0001 is preserved at the China Railway Museum

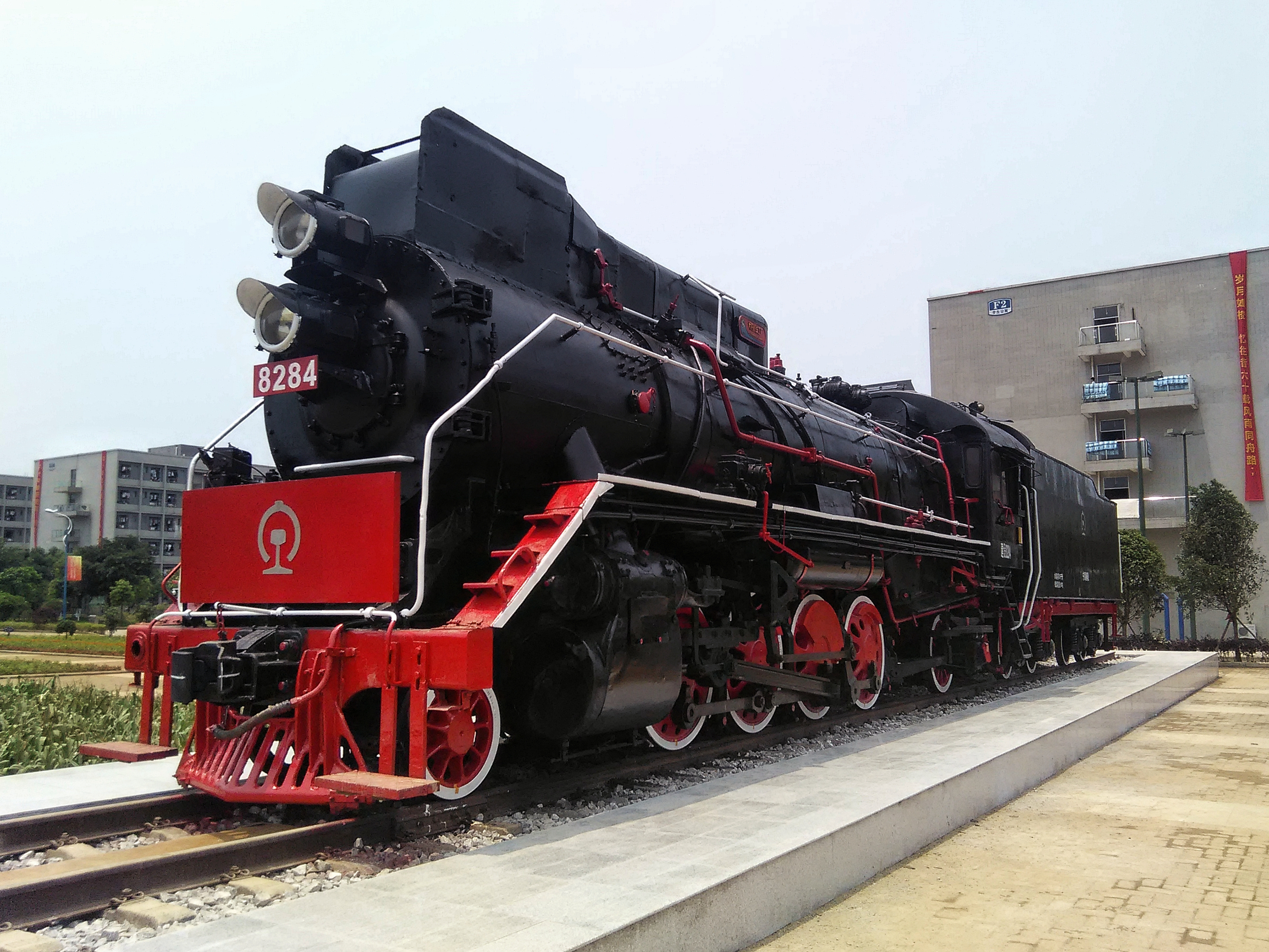
JS 8284 is preserved at Liuzhou Railway Vacational Technical College. It belong to Jinchengjiang Locomotive Depot, Liuzhou Railway Bureau before it retired. However, it painted "Liuzhou Locomotive Depot, Nanning Railway Bureau" now.

- China Railways DF
- China Railways DF2
- China Railways DF7D
- China Railways DF10
- China Railways FD
- China Railways JS
- China Railways JF
- China Railways JF11
- China Railways KD7
- China Railways QJ
- China Railways SL6

== Subordinate Agencies ==
- Guilin Locomotive Area(Former Guilin Locomotive Depot)
- Jinchengjiang Locomotive Area(Former Jinchengjiang Locomotive Depot)
- Rong'an Locomotive Area(Former Rong'an Locomotive Depot)

== See also ==
- Nanning Locomotive Depot
- Liuzhou Railway Station
