= China Railways HXN5B =

Chinese diesel-electric locomotive class

HXN5B 和谐内5B
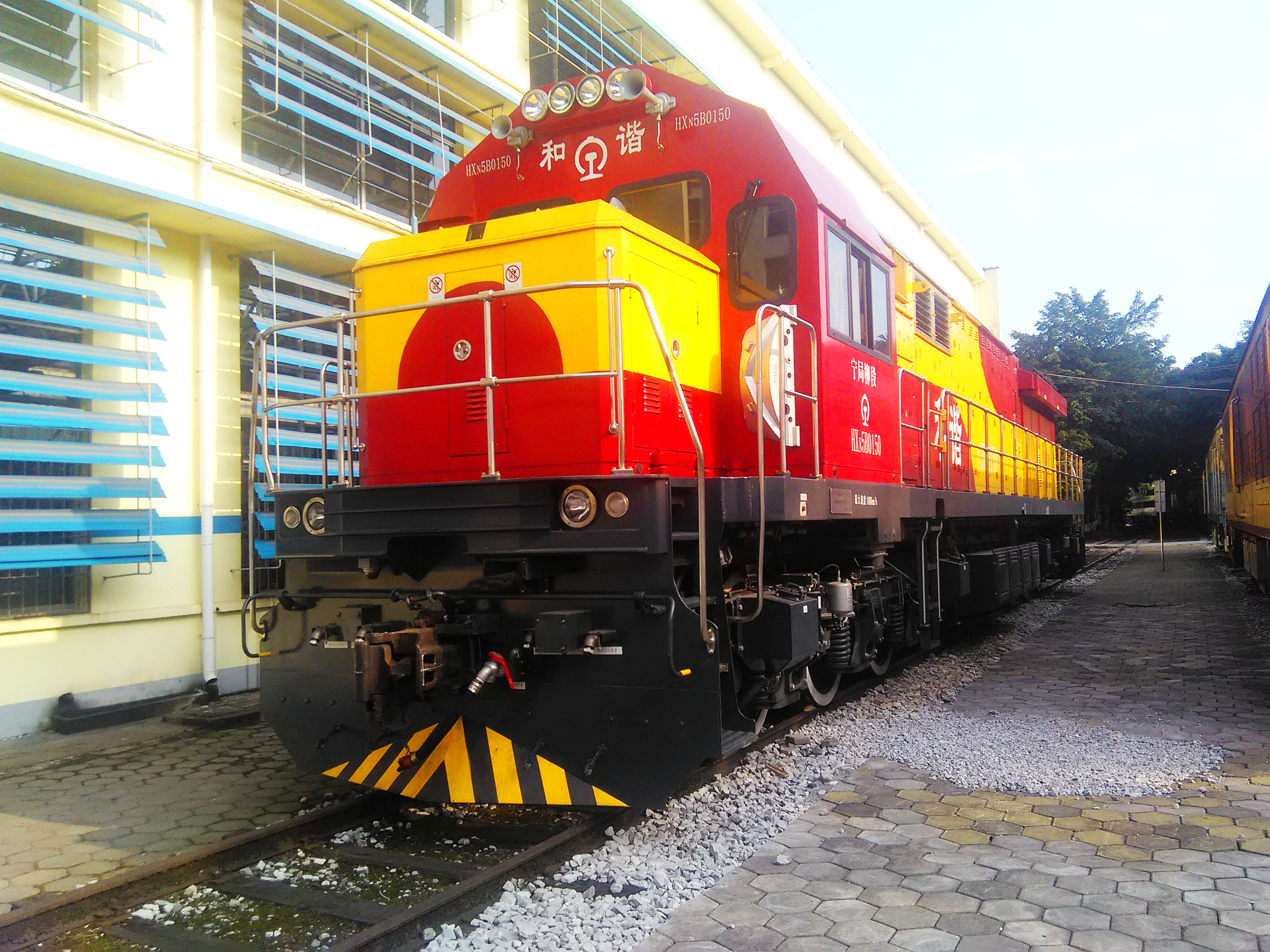
- HXN5B-0150, Liuzhou Locomotive Depot, June 2016.
Type and origin
- Power type: Diesel-electric
- Builder: Qishuyan Locomotive and Rolling Stock Works; China
- Build date: 2012–present
- Total produced: 160
Specifications
- Configuration
  - UIC: Co′Co′
- Gauge: 1,435 mm (4 ft 8 1/2 in); 1,520 mm (4 ft 11 27/32 in)
- Minimum curve: 100 m (328 ft 1 in)
- Axle load: 25 t (55,000 lb)
- Loco weight: 150 t (330,000 lb)
- Fuel type: Diesel
- Fuel capacity: 8,500 L (2,200 US gal)
- Prime mover: R12V280ZJ
- Generator: CDJF212
- Traction motors: 6 x CDJD113
- Cylinders: 12
- Cylinder size: 280 mm (11 in)
- Transmission: electric (AC-DC-AC)
Performance figures
- Maximum speed: 100 km/h (62 mph)
- Power output: 3,530 kW (4,730 hp)
- Tractive effort
  - Starting: 560.000 kN (125,893 lbf)
  - Continuous: 540.000 kN (121,397 lbf)
Career
- Operators: China Railway

The HXN5B, (Chinese: 和谐内5B) is a diesel-electric locomotive used by China Railway in the People's Republic of China. It has been in production since 2012. It is a new-generation road switcher type made in China and used for yard and road switching services.

China Railway Corporation also ordered the new design of the HXN5B with variable gauge. The HXN5B-2001 with the new design was built in 2017, like the DF7C and DF7G, it was fitted with a regauging device to allow operation on Russian gauge lines. The locomotive was passed the technical review of China Railway Corporation in April 2018.

== Main users ==
The HXN5B is used by China Railway Corporation:

- Ürümqi Railway Bureau
- Chengdu Railway Bureau
- Nanning Railway Bureau
- Guangzhou Railway Group
- Kunming Railway Bureau
- Xi'an Railway Bureau
- Lanzhou Railway Bureau
- Nanchang Railway Bureau
- Shanghai Railway Bureau
- Taiyuan Railway Bureau

== Gallery ==
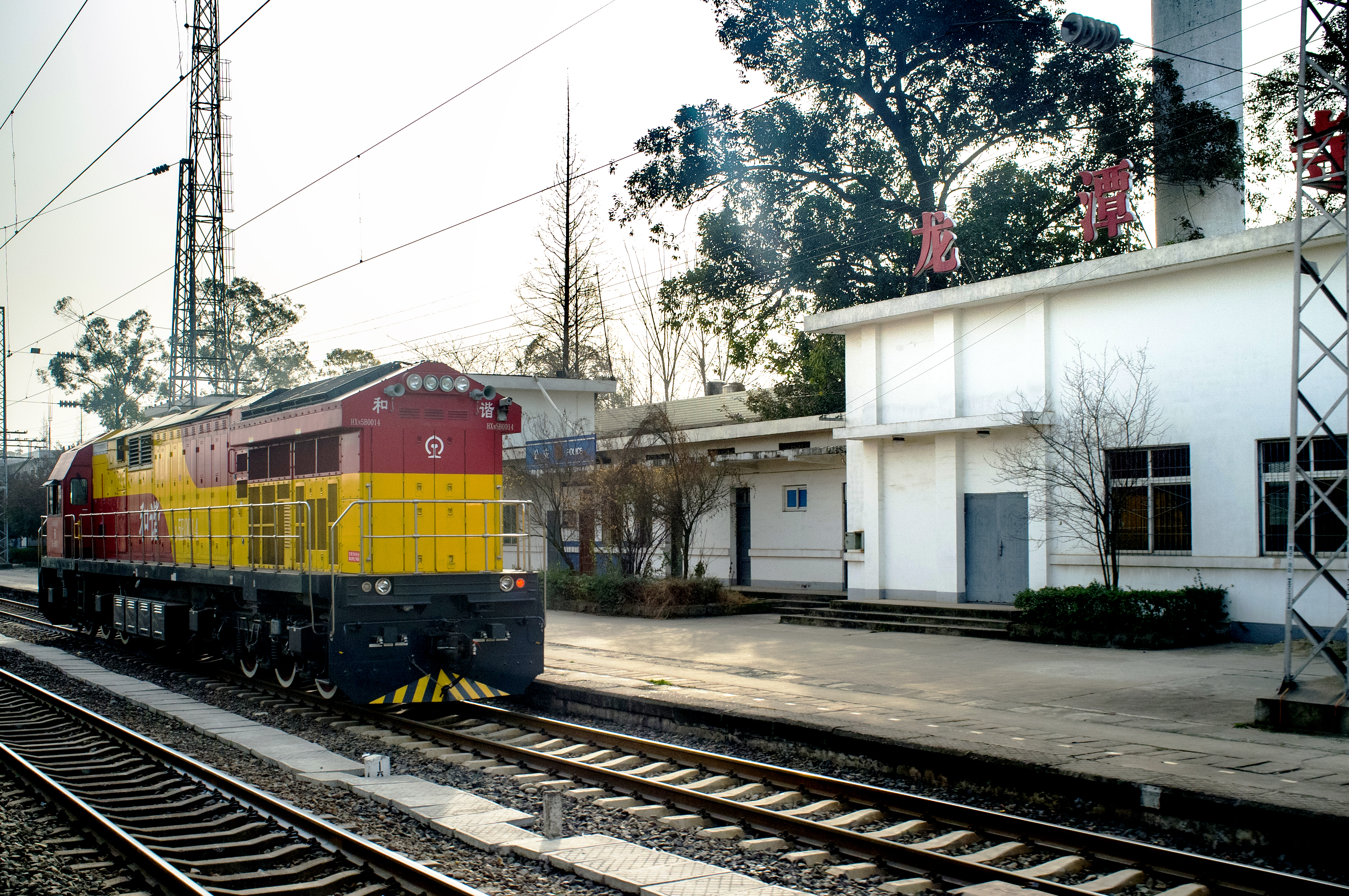
HXN5B-0014 at Longtansi Railway Station

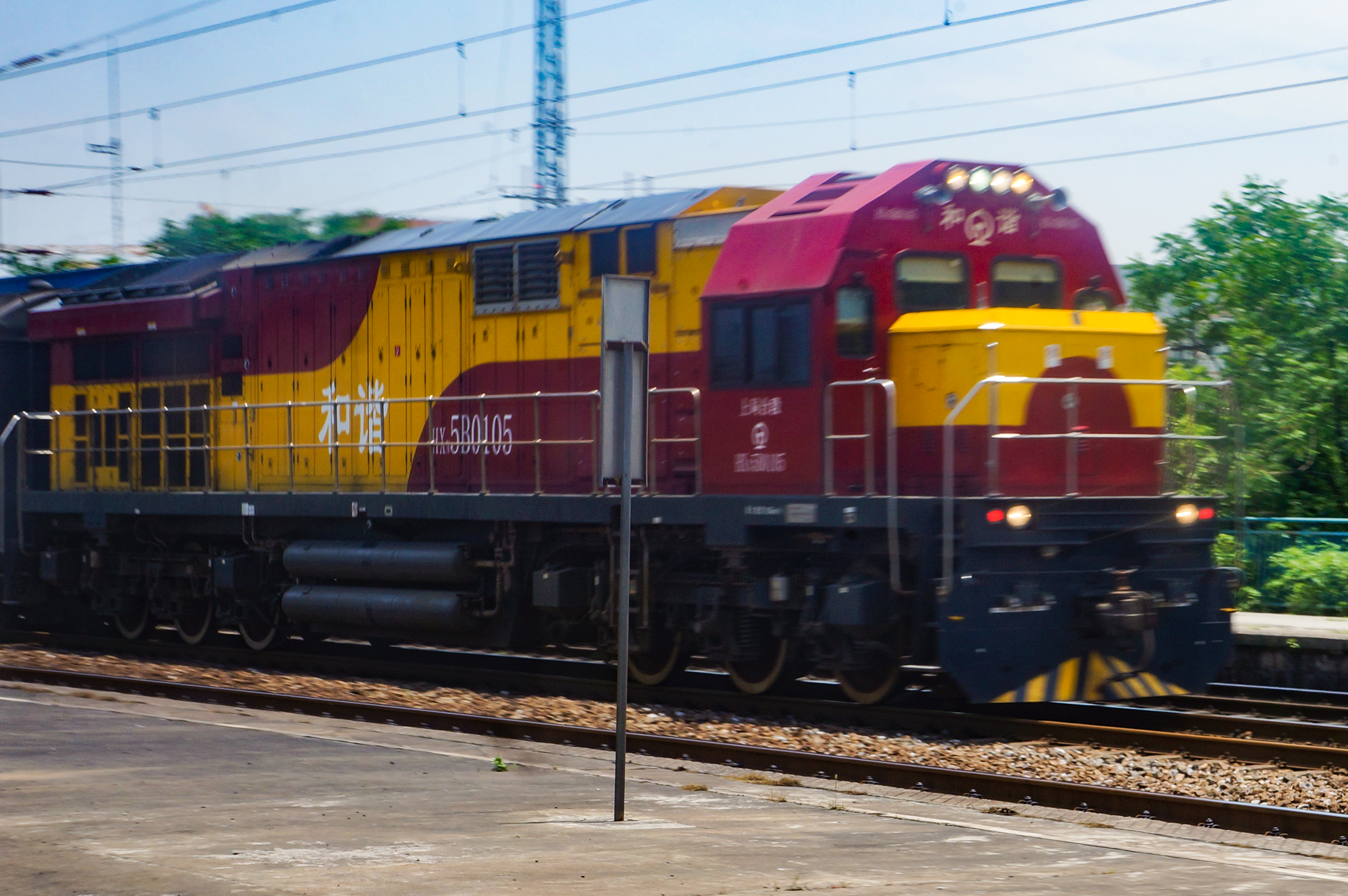
HXN5B-0105 at Chaohu Railway Station

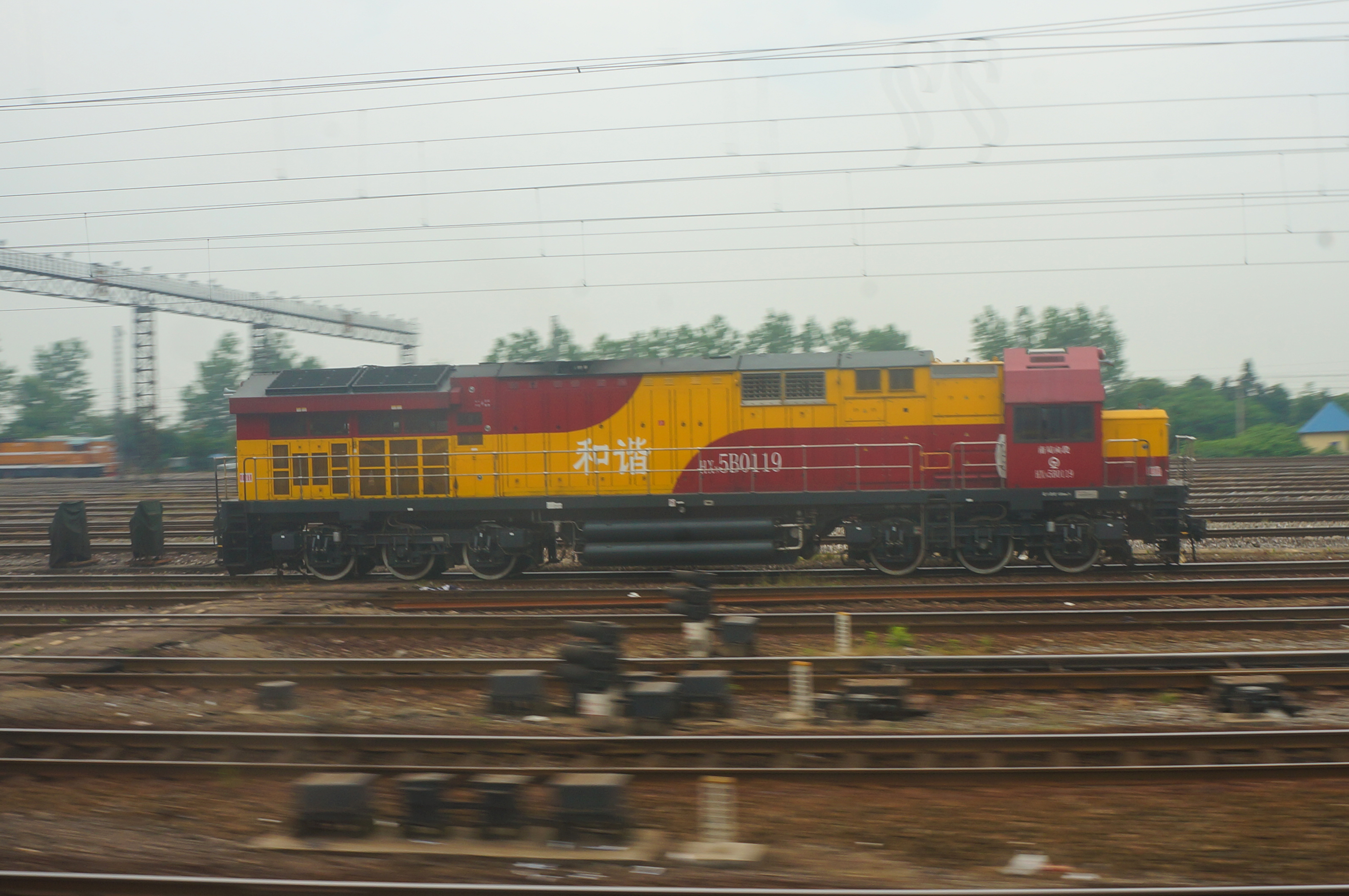
HXN5B-0119 at Jiujiangxi Railway Station

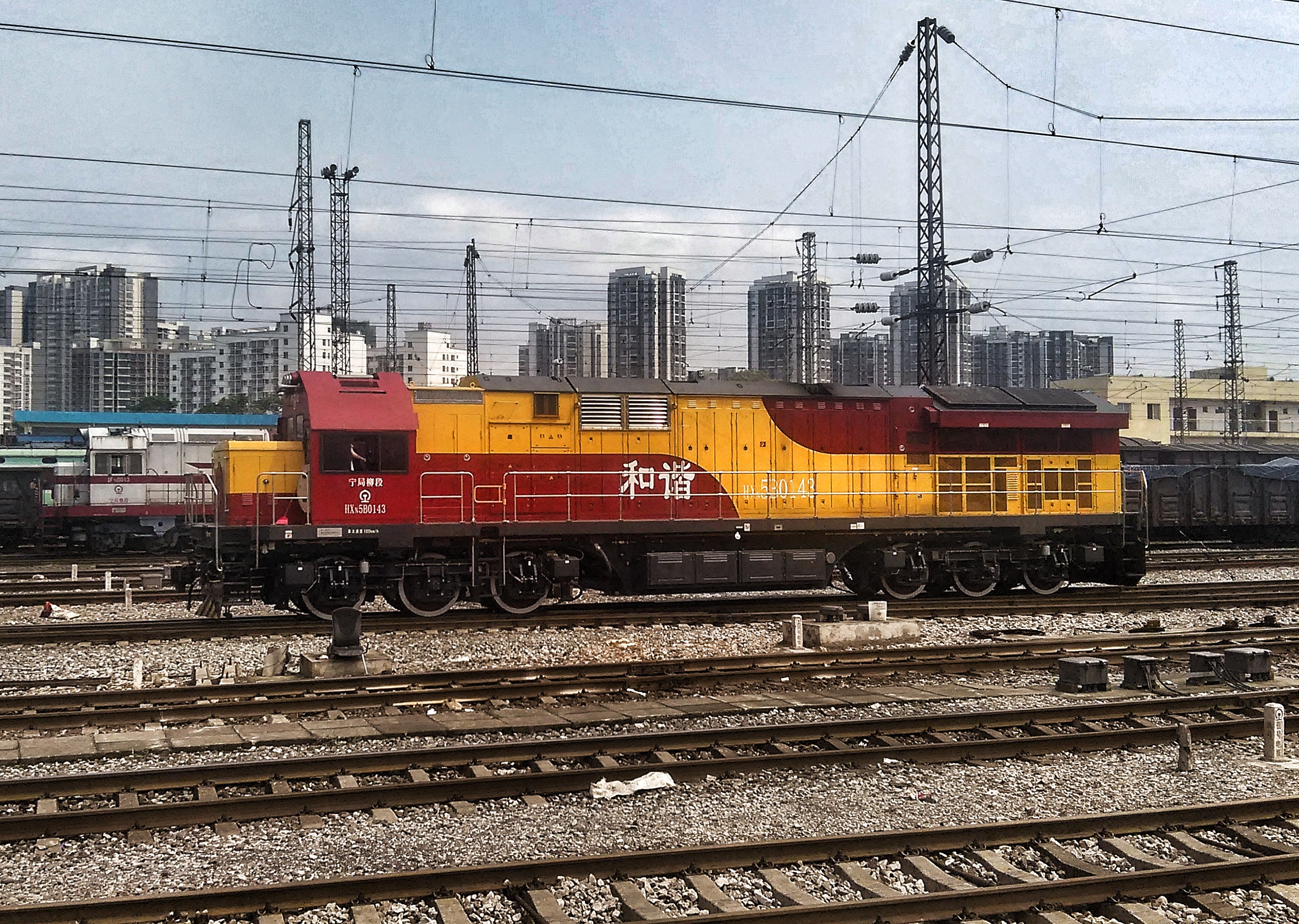
HXN5B-0143 in Liuzhou South Railway Station

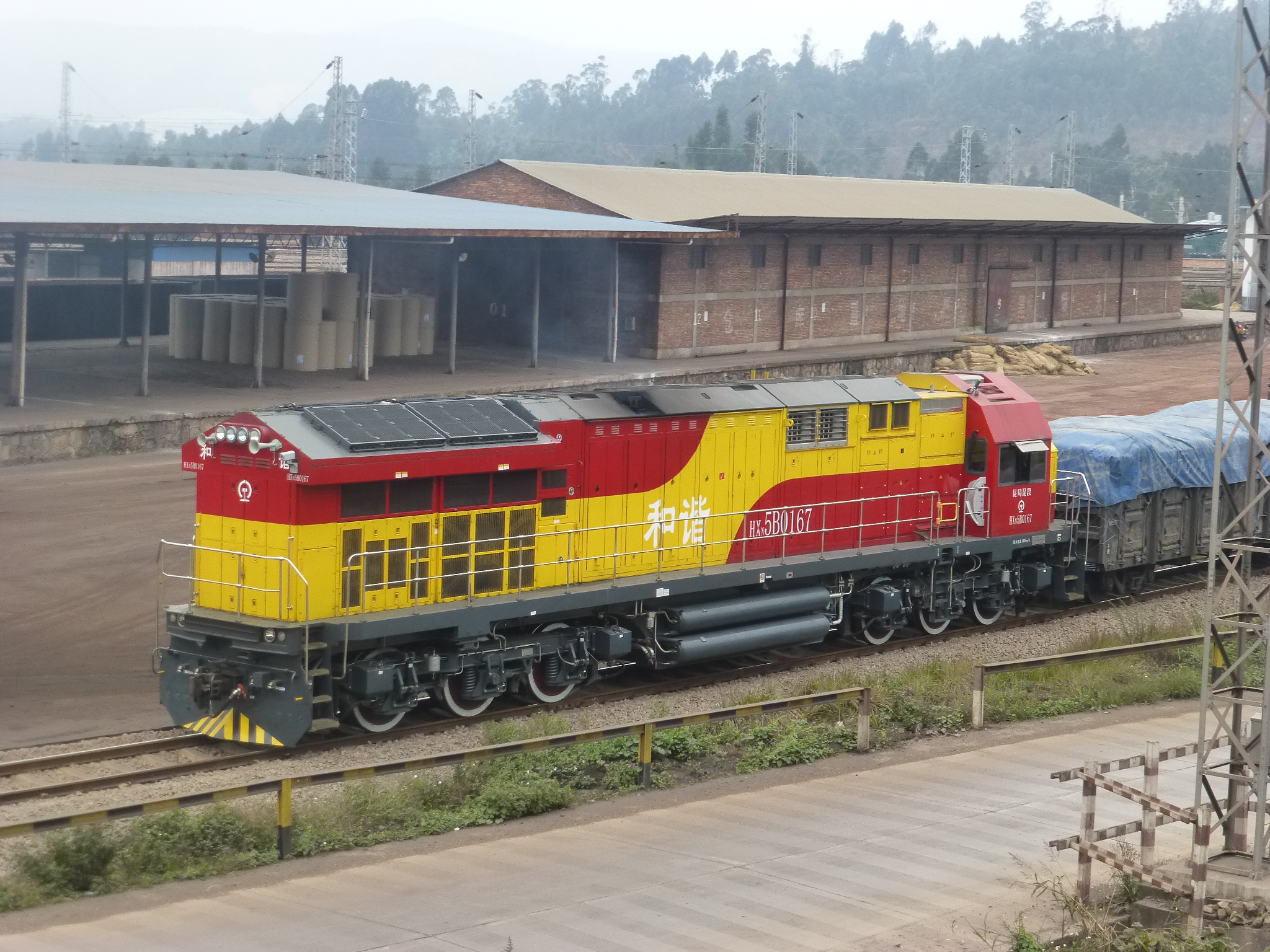
HXN5B-0167 in Yuxi South Railway Station

== See also ==
- List of locomotives in China
- China Railways HXN5
