= China Railways DF =

Chinese diesel-electric locomotive class

Dongfeng 东风
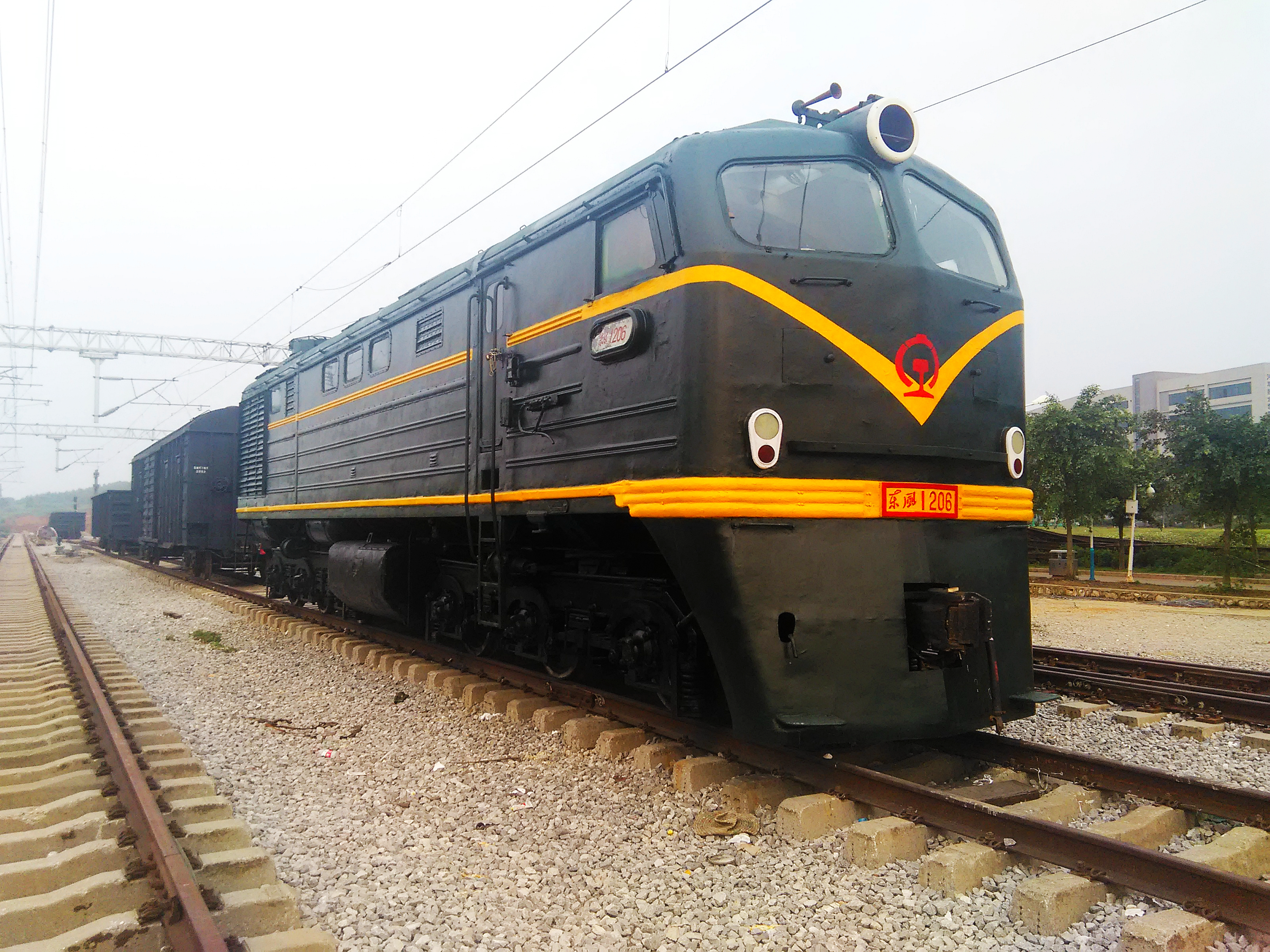
- DF-1206 is in Liuzhou Railway Vacational Technical College, May 2016.
Type and origin
- Power type: Diesel-electric
- Builder: Dalian Locomotive Works; Qishuyan Locomotive Works; Datong Locomotive Works; Chengdu Locomotive Works
- Model: TE3
- Build date: 1958 - 1974; 1981
- Total produced: 933
Specifications
- Configuration
  - AAR: C-C
  - UIC: Co′Co′
- Gauge: 1,435 mm (4 ft 8 1/2 in)
- Length: 16,920 mm (55 ft 6 in)
- Width: 3,335 mm (10 ft 11.3 in)
- Height: 4,775 mm (15 ft 8.0 in)
- Axle load: 21 t (46,000 lb)
- Loco weight: 126 t (278,000 lb)
- Fuel type: Diesel
- Prime mover: 10L207E
- Generator: ZQFR-1350
- Traction motors: 6 x ZQDR-204
- Transmission: electric (DC-DC)
Performance figures
- Maximum speed: 100 km/h (62 mph)(DF); 120 km/h (75 mph)(DF3)
Career
- Operators: China Railway; Vietnam Railways
- Numbers: DF 1201～1830 (CR); DF 2001～2094 (CR); DF3 0001～0226 (CR); D16E 2006-2008 (VR)
- Nicknames: Old DF (老东风); Crying face (哭脸) (DF 1201～1277)

The DF (Chinese: 东风; pinyin: Dōngfēng) was a type of diesel-electric locomotive used in the People's Republic of China. It was first introduced in 1958 and was produced until 1974. It was the first common mixed-traffic diesel-electric locomotive in China and was used for both passenger and freight services. The DF3 (Chinese: 东风3; pinyin: Dōngfēng 3) is an upgraded model of the DF.

== History ==
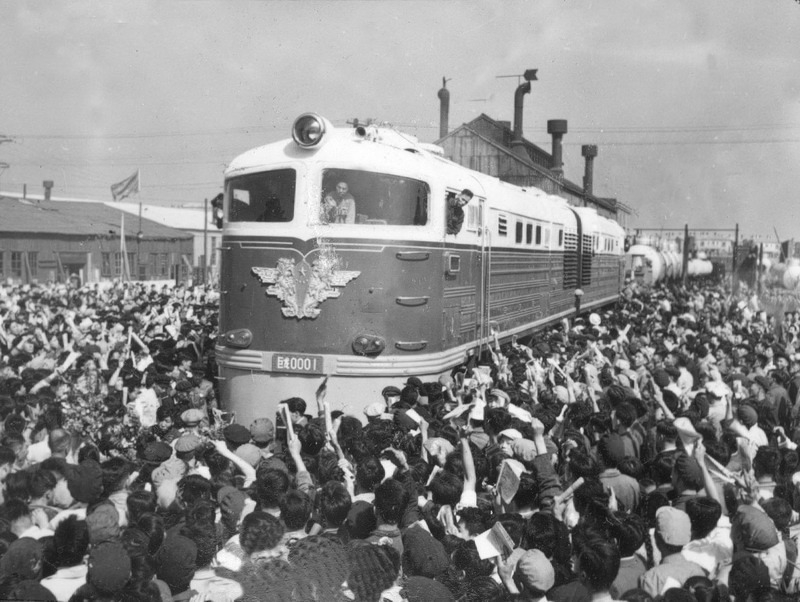
The first China Railways "Julong" (Great Dragon) diesel locomotive produced by Dalian Rolling Stock Factory was rolling out.

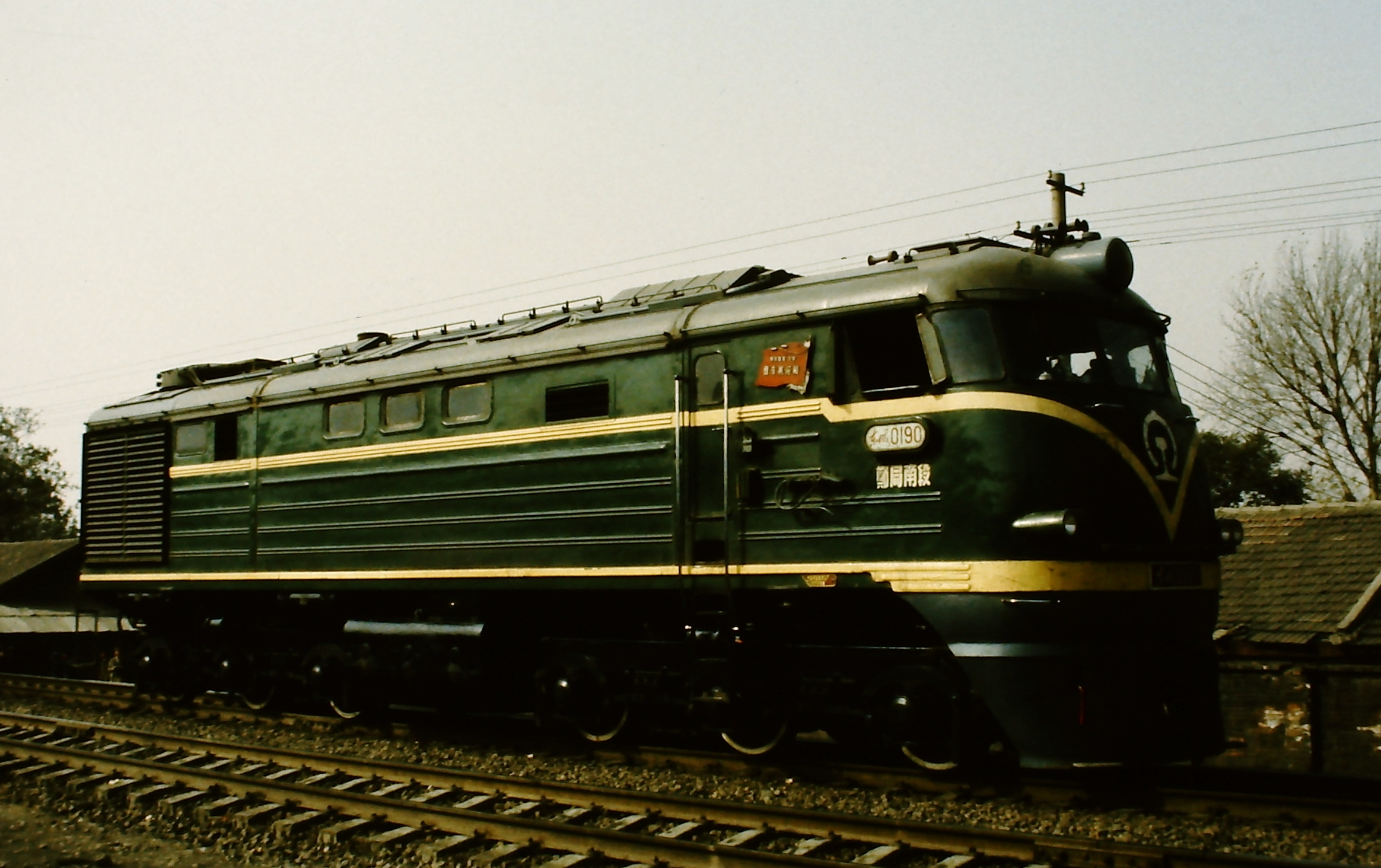
DF3-0190 in Harbin (1984)

The DF design was based on a 1958 built prototype, the Julong, which was essentially a Soviet TE3 and was built with Soviet technical assistance. The DF used a 10-cylinder opposed piston engine of type 10E207. This was a copy of the Soviet 2D100 design, itself a copy of the Fairbanks Morse 38D8 ¾. Like the TE3s, the DFs were designed to be used in pairs, back to back, but appear to have spent most of their lives working singly, hardly a problem when there were wyes everywhere to turn steam locomotives.

DF and DF3 were used in many parts of China but by the late 1980s, more modern diesels, such as the DF4B, had ousted them from primary routes. Some hung on in CNR service until the mid-1990s but few, if any, made it beyond the millennium. A number of redundant locos were bought by industrial and local railway operators, including the Heihe Local Railway in northern Heilongjiang. Heihe's had finished by 2008 and it is highly unlikely that any remain in service.

== Named locomotive ==
- DF3-0058 was named "Zhou Enlai"

== Manufacturers ==
DFs have been manufactured by several factories:

- Dalian Locomotive Works
- Qishuyan Locomotive Works
- Datong Locomotive Works
- Chengdu Locomotive Works (Note: Chengdu Locomotive Works retread 10 DFs between 1994 and 1995 which collected from Chengdu Railway Bureau and Kunming Railway Bureau. After the agreement of the Ministry of Railways, these locomotives were renumbered DF 2201 to DF 2210.)

== Preservation ==
=== Static preservation ===
- DF-1205: is preserved at Jiagedaqi Locomotive Depot, Harbin Railway Bureau.
- DF-1206: is preserved at Liuzhou Railway Vacational Technical College
- DF-1301: is preserved at China Railway Museum.
- DF-2058: is preserved at Yunnan Railway Museum.
- DF-2207 is in Luohu District, Shenzhen.

=== Other vehicles ===
- JL-0001: made by Dalian Locomotive Works in September 1958. However, the JL Locomotive was scrapped in 2000s.
- 3 DFs belong to Yunnan Smelter: DF-2026, DF-2012, DF-1683.
- At least 4 DFs in Guangxi: Nanning Chemical Factory have DF-1227 and DF-1210; Nanning Huqiu Steel Market have DF-1587; DF-1846 was located in Guilin East railway station.
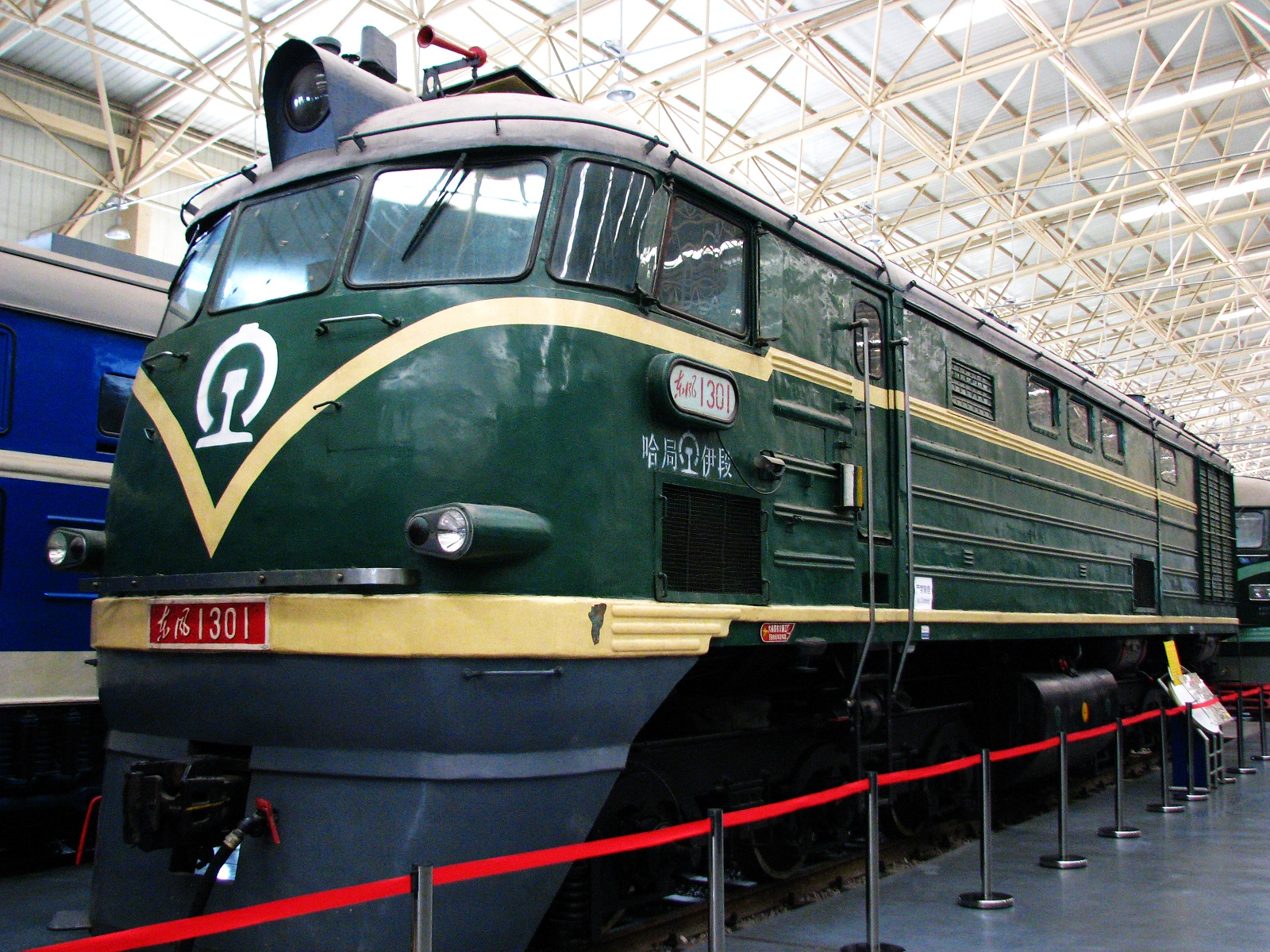
DF-1301 at China Railway Museum.

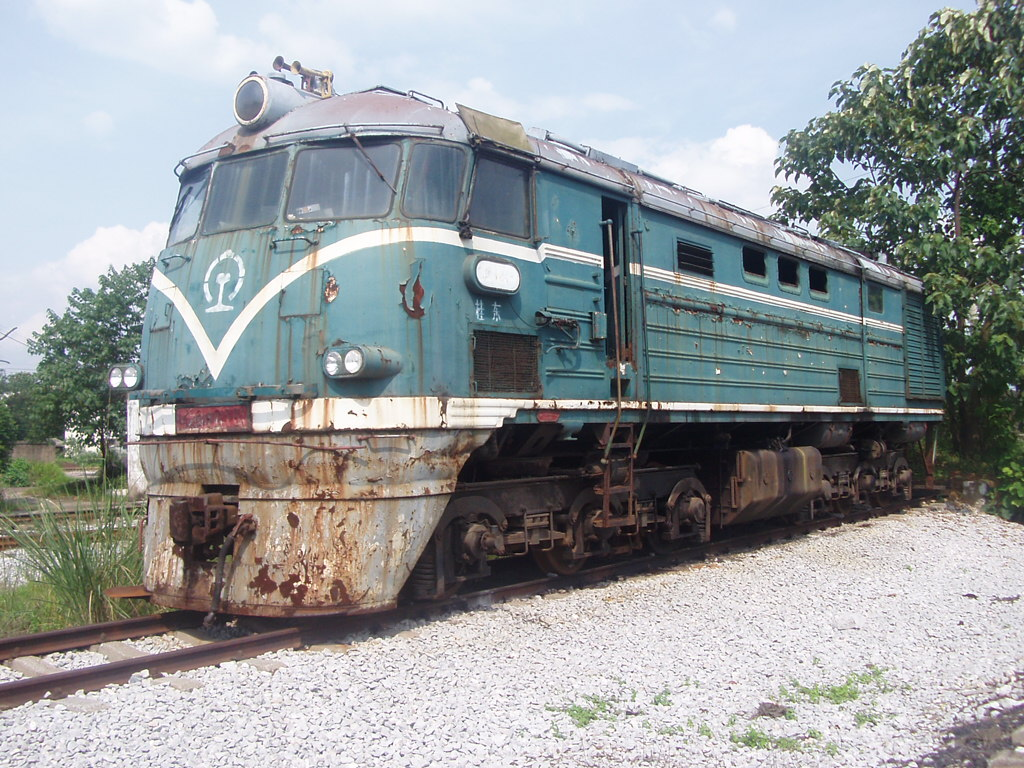
DF-1846 in Guilin East Railway Station.

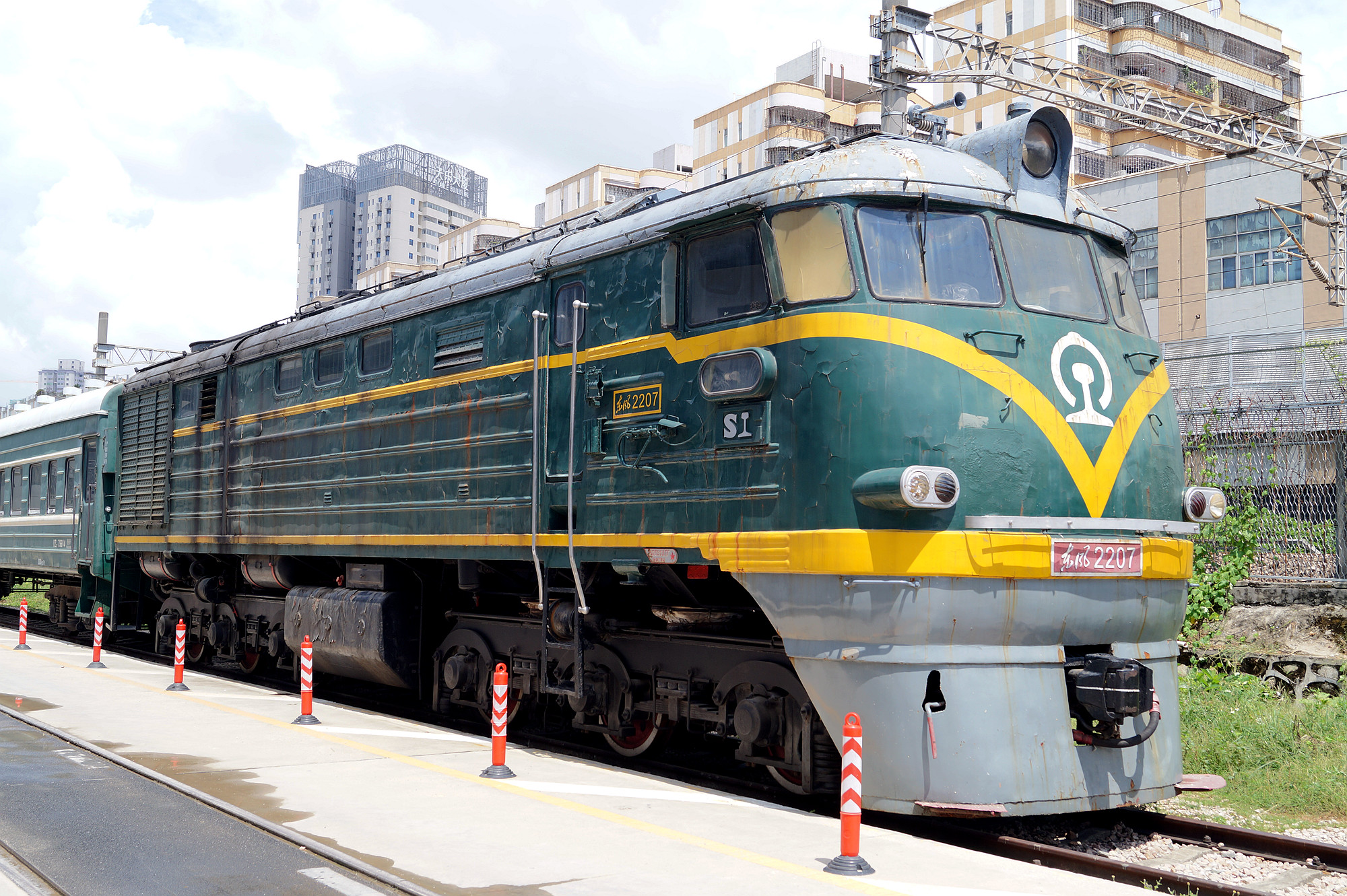
DF-2207 is in Luohu District, Shenzhen.

== Vietnam Railways D16E ==
These three DF Locomotives were imported from China and were numbered 2006 -2008. The main photo above depicts D16E - 2008 outside the Yen Vien Locomotive Workshop. They were apparently used for Yen Vien - Dong Dang freights and were rated at 1800 hp but were down rated to 1600 hp in VN service. It would appear that at least one locomotive has survived (at least up to 2004) and is stored at the back of a shed in Yen Vien. There is a suggestion also that the original 3 were somehow cannibalised when parts became scarce.

== See also ==
- China Railway DF4, the successor model of DF
