= China Railways DF11 =

Chinese diesel-electric locomotive class

Dongfeng 11 东风11
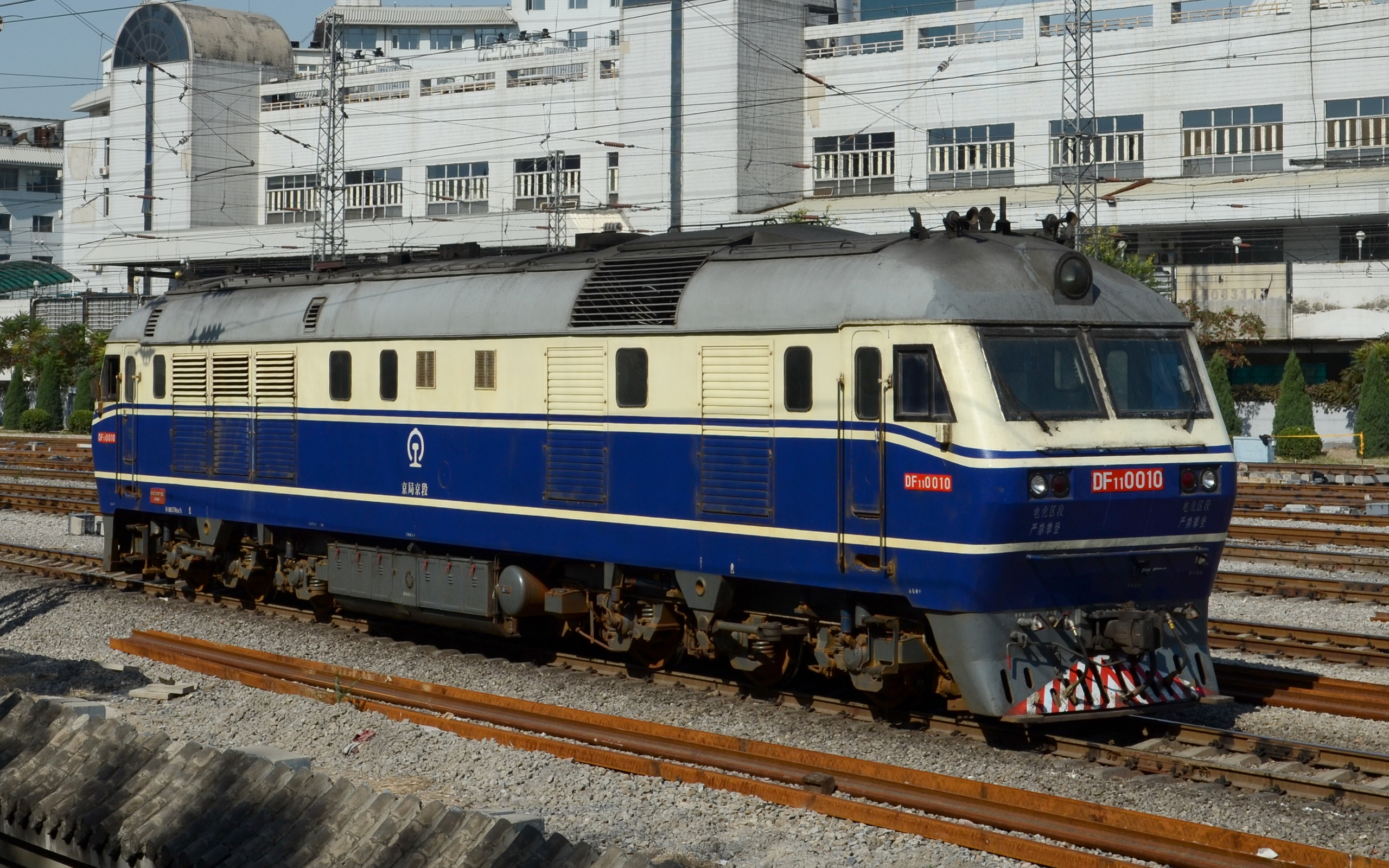
- DF11-0010 at Beijing West railway station
Type and origin
- Power type: Diesel-electric
- Builder: CRRC Qishuyan
- Serial number: 0001 ~ 0458; 1898
- Model: DF11
- Build date: 1992-2005
- Total produced: 459
Specifications
- Configuration
  - UIC: Co′Co′
- Gauge: 1,435 mm (4 ft 8 1/2 in)
- Wheel diameter: 1,050 mm (41.3 in)
- Minimum curve: 145 metres (7.2 ch)
- Length: 20.15 m (66 ft 1 in)
- Width: 3.304 m (10 ft 10.1 in)
- Height: 4.736 m (15 ft 6.5 in)
- Axle load: 23 t (23 long tons; 25 short tons)
- Loco weight: 138 t (136 long tons; 152 short tons)
- Fuel capacity: 6,000 L (1,300 imp gal; 1,600 US gal)
- Water cap.: 1,200 L (260 imp gal; 320 US gal)
- Sandbox cap.: 400 kg (880 lb)
- RPM range: 1000 rpm
- Engine type: 16V280ZJA (Rated power 3,860 kW (5,180 hp))
- Alternator: JF204C
- Traction motors: ZD106 × 6
- Transmission: Electric AC - DC drives
- Loco brake: Straight air, Electrical brake
Performance figures
- Maximum speed: 170 km/h (105.6 mph); 153 km/h (95.1 mph) (plateau type) sustained speed : 65.6 km/h (40.8 mph); 57.8 km/h (35.9 mph) (plateau type)
- Power output: Engine: 3,610 kW (4,840 hp); At rail: 3,040 kW (4,080 hp)
- Tractive effort: 245 kN (55,000 lb_{f}) (maximum) / 160 kN (36,000 lb_{f}) (continued) plateau : 277 kN (62,000 lb_{f}) (maximum) / 181 kN (41,000 lb_{f}) (continued)
Career
- Operators: China Railway
- Nicknames: 狮子 (Lion)

The DF11 (Chinese: 东风11) is a semi-high-speed diesel-electric locomotive used on the People's Republic of China's national railway system. This locomotive was built by CRRC Qishuyan.

== Overview ==
The DF11 was a by-product of the scientific and technological objective of China's Eighth Five-Year Plan, and was designed for 160 km/h (99 mph) runs on the Guangzhou-Shenzhen Railway. The Guangzhou-Shenzhen Railway opened with an operating speed of 160 km/h (99 mph), utilizing high-speed passenger trains and the level of potential development of a new type of high speed passenger diesel locomotive.

By the end of 1990 development had begun by the Qishuyan Locomotive Works, who modified a DF9 locomotive, changing traction motor gear transmission ratio, thereby increasing the maximum speed from 140 km/h (87 mph) up to 160 km/h (99 mph). The new locomotive was then tested to obtain the experimental data for high-speed diesel service.

In 1991, the Ministry of Railways ordered the new locomotive based on the design plans developed by the Qishuyan plant. Code-named the DF11, the first DF11-0001 was completed in December 1992, with the test trials completed in August 1993. The next locomotive, No. 0002, reached the maximum speed of 183 km/h (114 mph) during a test in the National Railway Test Centre (Eastern Suburbs Branch) in April 1994.

After the completion of the trials, the DF11 was formally placed into service on the Guangzhou-Shenzhen High Speed Railway Line in December. Production of the DF11 has stopped production as of 2005, Qishuyan factory produced 459 units total (license number 0001-0458, 1898), with DF11 1898 being named "The Zhou Enlai" (the number is the same as Zhou Enlai's year of birth), belonging to Shanghai Railway Administration Shanghai Locomotive Depot.

The DF11 diesel locomotive is equipped with an AC-DC electric transmission, 16V280ZJA diesel engine, 1 × three-phase AC synchronous alternator model JF204C, and 6 × ZD106 DC traction motors. Maximum braking power from the diesel is 3,610 kW (4,840 hp), with nominal wheel power at 3,040 kW (4,080 hp), capable of sustaining operating speeds of up to 160 km/h (99 mph). Maximum design speed of the Co-Co trucks is 170 km/h.

The cab design incorporates a 25° inclination for streamlining. The locomotive microcomputer control system consists of constant power excitation control, cooling, anti-wheel slip transfer control, fault diagnosis display, with full power to test the resistance of dynamic braking system functions, and electro-pneumatic braking system. The DF11 can haul a 640 t (630 long tons; 705 short tons) passenger train (about 12 cars) up to the maximum balancing speed of 167 km/h (104 mph) on straight track; or a 1,100 t (1,083 long tons; 1,213 short tons) train (about 20 cars) to a maximum balancing speed of 143 km/h (89 mph).

In addition, the DF11 locomotives are designed for Xinjiang, Ürümqi Railway Bureau plateau type of configuration, mainly to increase the output of power, and installation of sound bilateral air intake/air filtration/filter sand unit, and to increase the gear ratio change from 76:29 to 65:22, increasing starting traction and sustained traction. However, the maximum speed is reduced to 153 km/h (95 mph).

The class formerly served the Guangzhou-Kowloon Through Train before being replaced by SS8 electric locomotives.

== Major incidents ==
On 28 April 2008, DF11-0400 locomotive, hauling Train No. 5034, collided with the derailed Train No. T195 in the Jinan-Zibo section of the Jiaoji Railway. The DF11-0400 locomotive was declared destroyed beyond repair and later scrapped.

== See also ==
- List of locomotives in China
- China Railways DF9
- China Railways DF11G
- China Railways DF11Z
