= China Railways DF11G =

Class of Chinese diesel-electric locomotives

Dongfeng 11G 东风11G
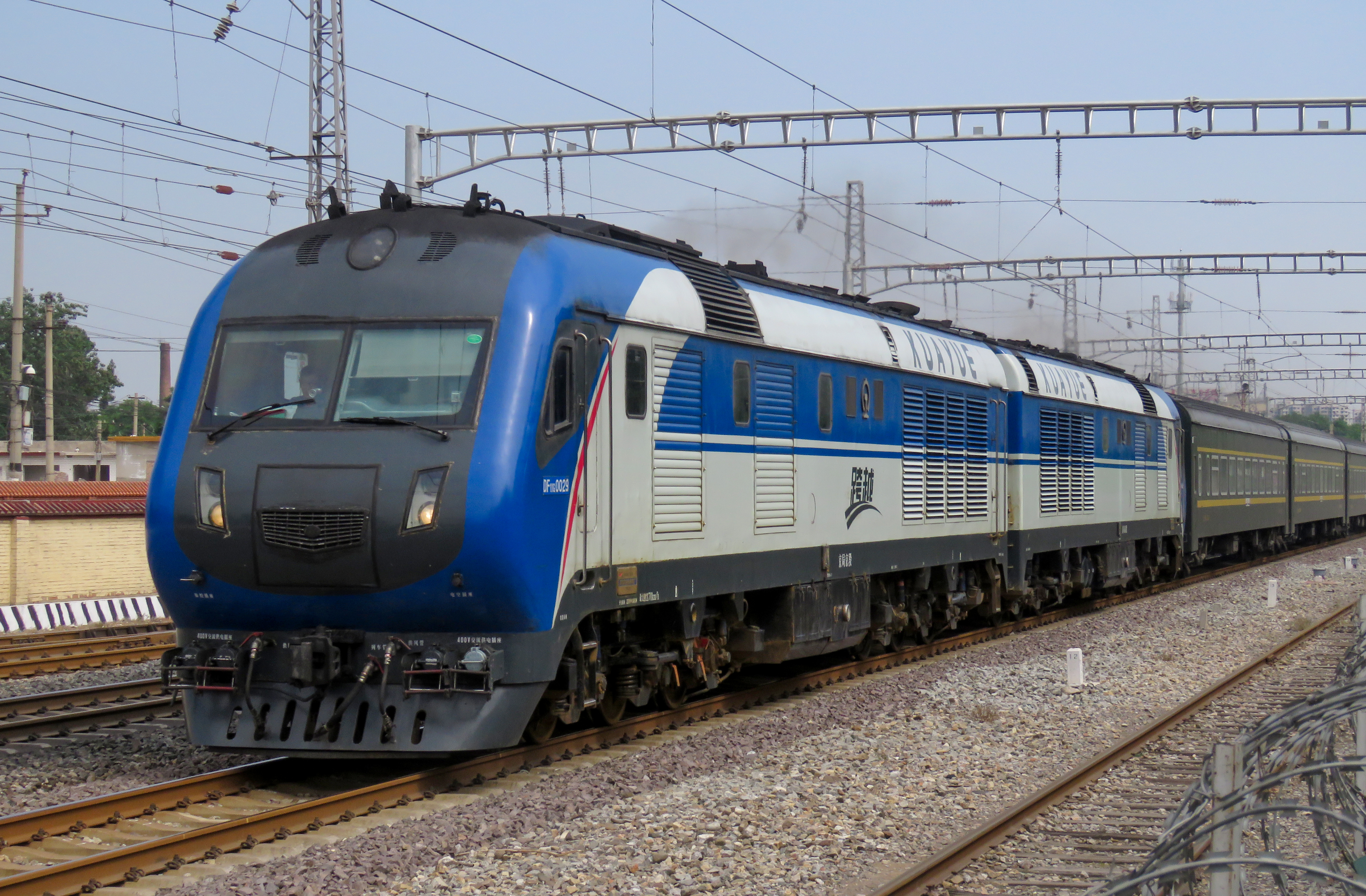
- DF11G-0029
Type and origin
- Power type: Diesel-electric
- Builder: Qishuyan Locomotive and Rolling Stock Works
- Model: DF11G
- Build date: 2004–2010
- Total produced: 184
Specifications
- Configuration
  - UIC: 2×Co'Co '
- Gauge: 1,435 mm (4 ft 8 1/2 in)
- Wheel diameter: 1,050 mm (41.3 in)
- Minimum curve: 145 metres (7.2 ch)
- Length: 44.00 m (144 ft 4 in)
- Width: 3.304 m (10 ft 10.1 in)
- Height: 4.736 m (15 ft 6.5 in)
- Axle load: 23 t (23 long tons; 25 short tons)
- Loco weight: 276 t (272 long tons; 304 short tons)
- Fuel capacity: 6,000 L (1,300 imp gal; 1,600 US gal)
- RPM range: 1000 rpm
- Engine type: 16V280ZJA (Rated power 3,860 kW (5,180 hp))
- Alternator: JF204C
- Traction motors: ZD106 × 12
- Transmission: Electric AC – DC drives
Performance figures
- Maximum speed: 170 km/h (105.6 mph) sustained speed : 83.5 km/h (51.9 mph)
- Power output: Engine: 7,220 kW (9,680 hp); At rail: 6,080 kW (8,150 hp)
- Tractive effort: 386 kN (87,000 lb_{f}) starting tractive effort: 250 kN (56,000 lb_{f})
Career
- Operators: China Railway
- Nicknames: 猪 (Pig)

The DF11G (Chinese: 东风11G, nickname: 猪头) is a twin unit semi-high-speed diesel-electric locomotive used on the People's Republic of China's national railway system. This locomotive was built by Qishuyan Locomotive and Rolling Stock Works. The DF11G Diesel Locomotive is a six axle passenger diesel locomotive, almost exclusively used as a back-to-back, semi-permanently coupled unit.

The DF11G has two batches, varying in the voltage of head-end power. In the first batch, HEP is supplied as three-phase AC at 380 V, while the second batch supports DC 600 V HEP.

== See also ==
- List of locomotives in China
- China Railways DF11
- China Railways DF11Z
