= Zhou Mengbo =

Chinese business executive

- 周孟波
- Born: February 1965 (age 61); China
- Education: PLA Railway Corps Engineering College; Shijiazhuang Tiedao University
- Occupation: Business executive
- Years active: 1985–2019
- Political party: Chinese Communist Party

Zhou Mengbo (Chinese: 周孟波; pinyin: Zhōu Mèngbō; born February 1965) is a Chinese business executive who served as deputy party secretary of China Railway Engineering Corporation between 2018 and 2019. Previously he was vice chairman from 2007 to 2018 and deputy general manager from 2006 to 2007. He is also a professor-level senior engineer. He absconded from China in May 2019 and arrested overseas and sent back in August 2021.

== Biography ==
Born in February 1965, he graduated from PLA Railway Corps Engineering College and Shijiazhuang Tiedao University.

In July 1985, he joined the China Railway Group Limited. He was appointed director of China Railway Bridge Bureau Group Co., Ltd., in August 2000, becoming chairman and general manager in April 2001. In September 2006, he was appointed deputy general manager of China Railway Engineering General Corporation (now China Railway Engineering Corporation). After this office was terminated in September 2007, he was elevated to vice chairman. In March 2018, he was appointed Chinese Communist Party Deputy Committee Secretary, serving in the post until his resignation in May 2019.

=== Downfall ===
In May 2019, Zhou absconded abroad, and was caught by the International Office of Fleeing and Recovery of the Central Anti Corruption Coordination Group, Ministry of Public Security, and Henan Provincial Supervision Commission, cooperating with a foreign law enforcement agency.

== See also ==
- Operation Fox Hunt
