= Launching gantry =

Special-purpose mobile gantry crane

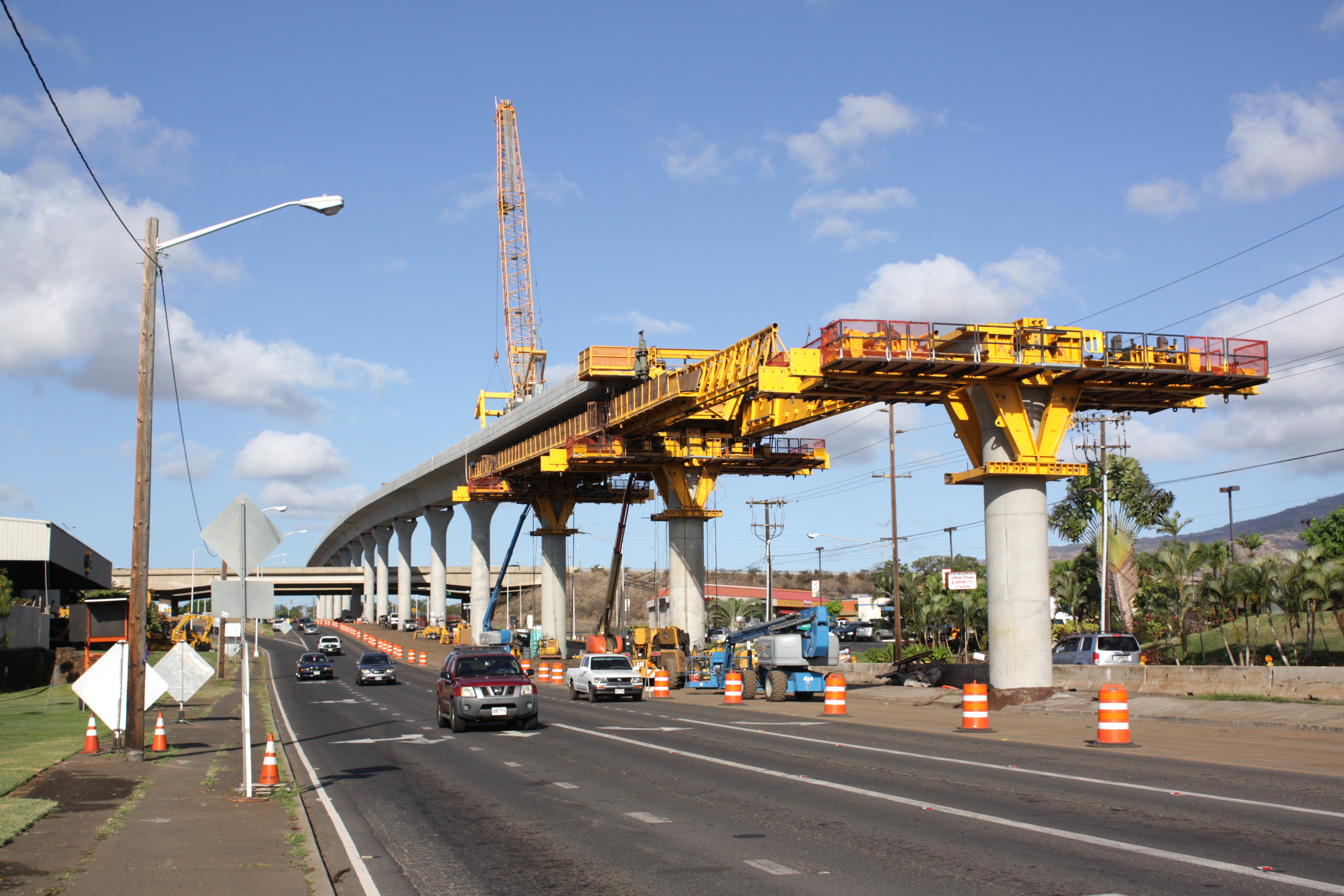
Underslung (lower-beam) launching gantry used for Skyline guideway construction (2015)

A launching gantry (also called bridge building crane, and bridge-building machine) is a special-purpose mobile gantry crane used in bridge construction, specifically segmental bridges that use precast box girder bridge segments or precast girders in highway and high-speed rail bridge construction projects. The launching gantry is used to lift and support bridge segments or girders as they are placed while being supported by the bridge piers instead of the ground.

While superficially similar, launching gantry machines should not be confused with movable scaffolding systems, which also are used in segmental bridge construction. Both feature long girders spanning multiple bridge spans which move with the work, but launching gantry machines are used to lift and support precast bridge segments and bridge girders, while movable scaffolding systems are used for cast-in-place construction of bridge segments.

== Operation and design ==
Typically, precast segmental bridges and precast girders are placed using ground-based cranes to lift each segment or girder. However, ground access to the spans may be challenged by the presence of existing infrastructure or bodies of water, or the height to which the segments must be raised can exceed the reach of ground-based cranes. A launching gantry can be used to solve these issues.

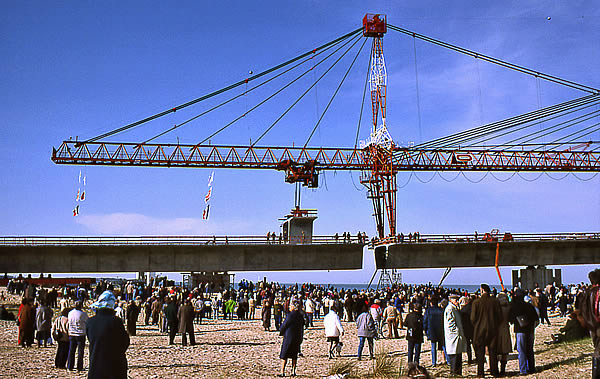
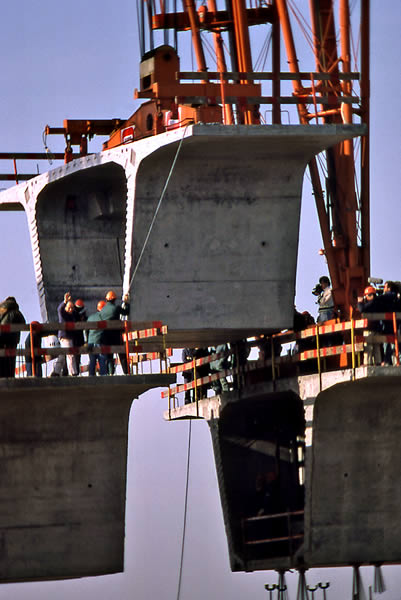
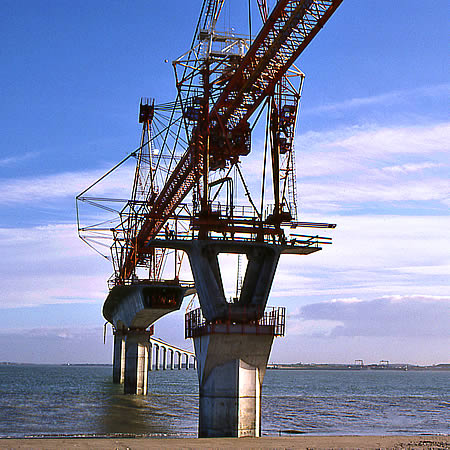
Single upper-beam launching gantry placing bridge segments for the Île de Ré bridge, c.1986–88

The most visible feature of a launching gantry are the twin parallel girders, which can either be above (upper-beam) or below (lower-beam or underslung) the bridge deck. However, a single beam can also be used, typically in upper-beam configuration. The launching gantry machine usually is sized to the construction project, with the length of the twin main girders approximately 2.3 times the distance between spans. This length enables the launching gantry to span the gap between two adjacent bridge piers while providing allowances for the distance required for launching to the next span and flexibility of movement to accommodate curved paths between piers. In some cases, hinges have been inserted into the gantry girders to allow tighter curves. The launching gantry girders are supported at each pier by braced frames which have a limited range of movement to facilitate placement of bridge segments or bridge girders; the launching gantry does not generally contact the bridge deck.

Two gantry trolleys can run the full length of the launching gantry girders. Each trolley is equipped with two winches: a main winch to suspend the load, and a translation winch to move the trolley along the girders. When bridge segments (or bridge girders) are delivered at the ground level, the launching gantry is used to pick them up and raise them to deck or pier height. If the segments (or girders) are delivered instead at the bridge deck level, the launching gantry moves back to allow the forward trolley to pick up the front end of the next segment (or girder), while the back end of the segment (or girder) is supported by the transportation vehicle; as the forward trolley moves forward, the rear trolley takes over supporting the back end from the vehicle.

Modern launching gantries are often demonstrated in live construction footage, showing the step-by-step lifting, longitudinal movement, and precise placement of precast box girder segments during span-by-span erection.

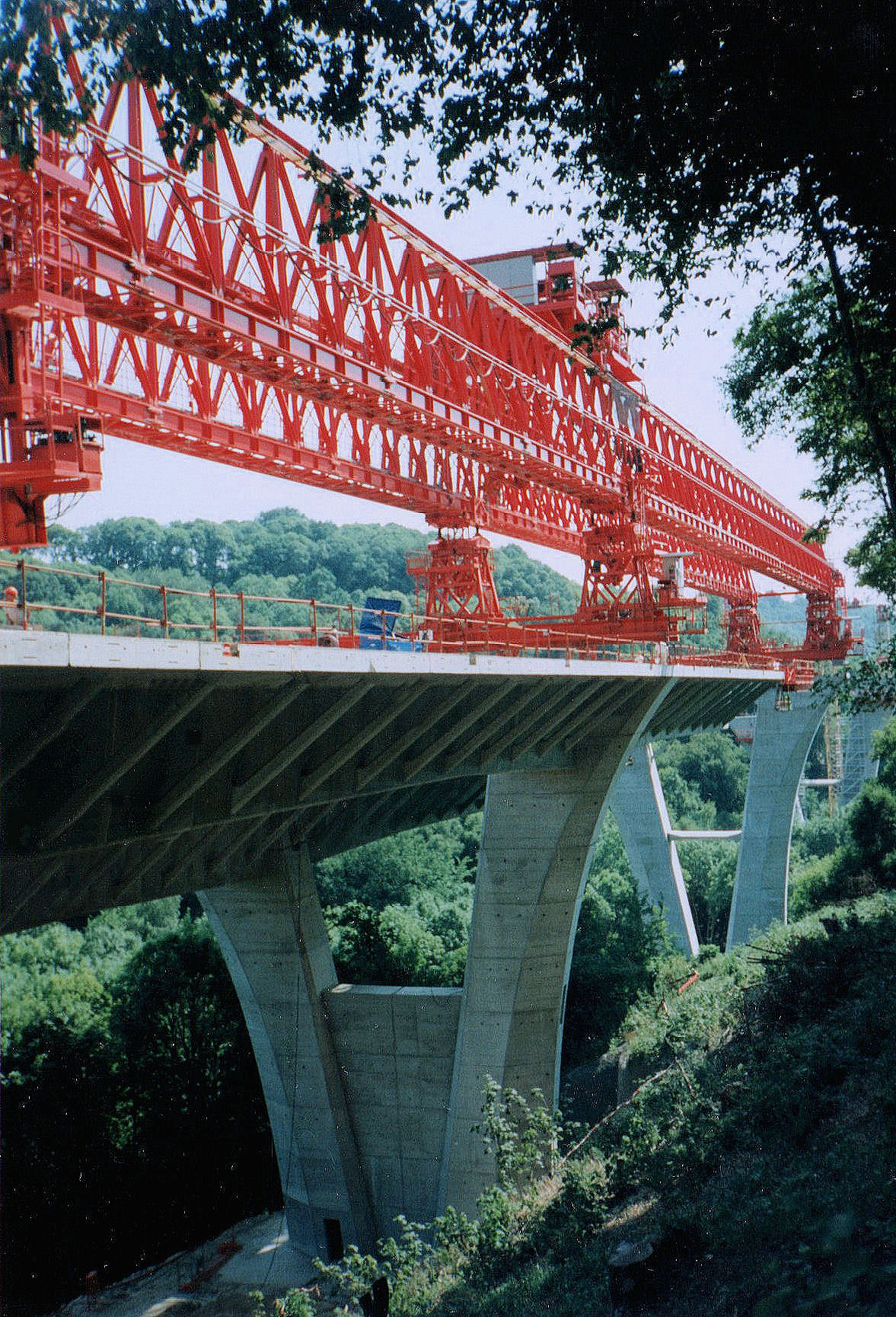
Twin-girder upper-beam launching gantry, during construction of the Viaduc de Rogerville (completed 1996)

Bridge segments (or bridge girders) are set in place by the launching gantry until the span between adjacent piers is completed. For segmental bridges, typically a span-by-span or balanced-cantilever approach is adopted to place segments. To free up the gantry trolley(s), temporary hangers are used to support each segment after it has been placed. In the span-by-span approach, all the segments for a span are placed before bridge tendons are tensioned; in this fashion, work progresses from one pier towards an adjacent pier. In the balanced-cantilever approach, segments are placed simultaneously on each side and work progresses from a central pier towards the two nearest piers instead. In either case, the launching gantry girders and hangers essentially serve as falsework prior to tensioning.

Once the bridge span between adjacent piers is completed, the winches on the trolleys are used to lift the gantry girders and "launch" them ahead to the next span. The process of lifting and placing bridge segments (or girders) followed by launching the gantry girders ahead is repeated until the bridge is complete.

An example of a large launching gantry is the SLJ900/32 designed in China by the Shijiazhuang Railway Design Institute and manufactured by the Beijing Wowjoint Machinery Company. This launching gantry is 91 metres (299 ft) long, 7 metres (23 ft) wide, and weighs 580 tonnes (640 short tons). When driving, the machine is supported by 64 wheels, in four sections of 16 wheels each (forming two trucks, one at each end). When launching, the forward end of the machine is supported (on sliding rails) by a strut lowered onto a bridge support column, while the truck for that end hangs off the gantry backbone with no support from beneath. Once the gantry straddles the open span, the bridge segment is lowered onto the bridge support piers, and the process reverses to retract the launching gantry. The SLJ900 moves at 8 km/h (5 mph) unloaded, and 5 km/h (3 mph) carrying a bridge segment.
