= China Railways DF4 =

Chinese diesel–electric locomotive class

Dongfeng 4 东风4
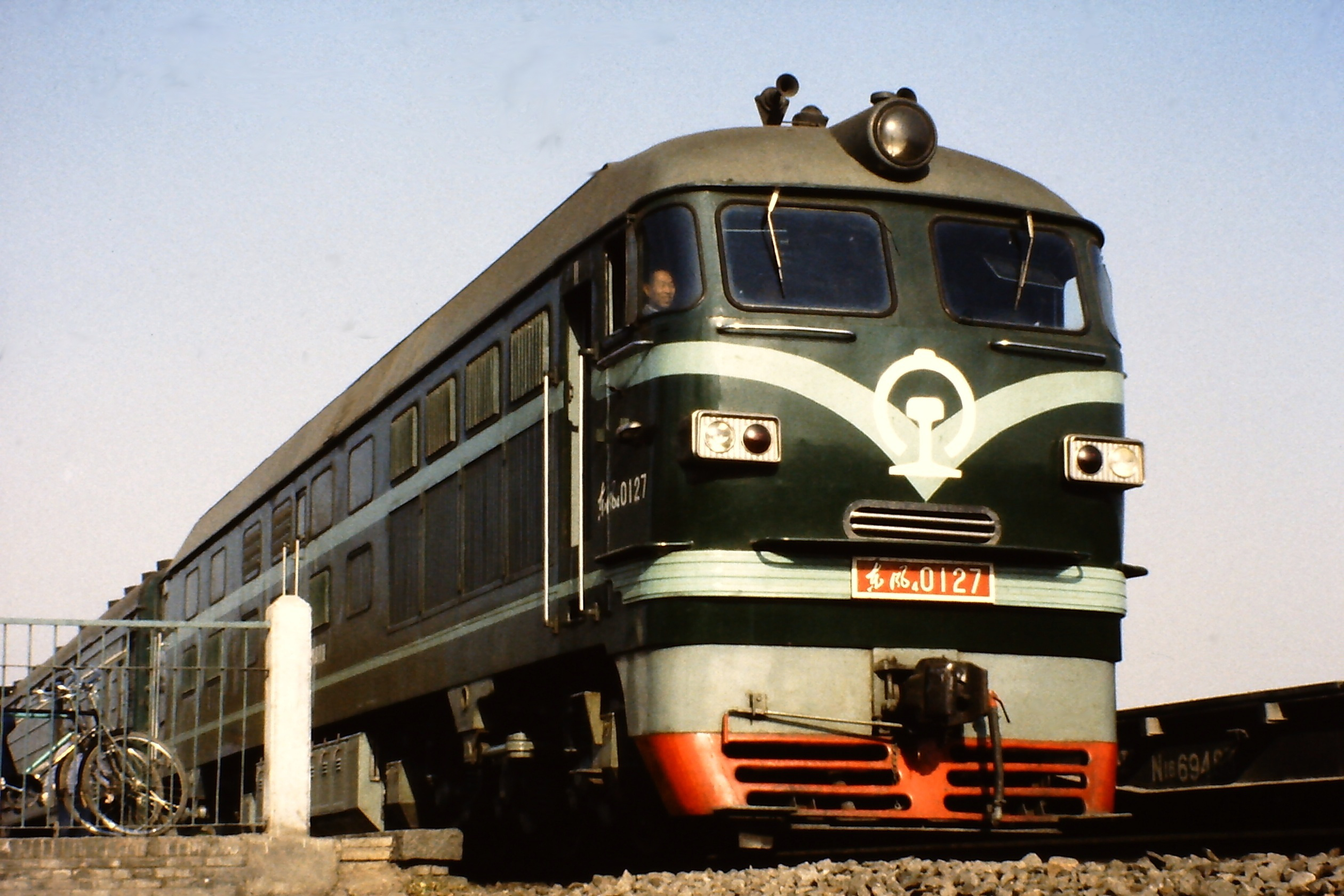
- DF4-0127 with a passenger train in 1984
Type and origin
- Power type: Diesel–electric
- Builder: CRRC Dalian, CRRC Datong, CRRC Sifang, CRRC Ziyang, Siemens
- Build date: DF4: 1969-1986; DF4B: 1984-present; DF4C: 1985-1999; DF4D/DD: 1999-present; DF4DF: 1999-2004; DF4DJ: 2000; DF4E: 1994-1997; CKD4A: 2002
- Total produced: DF4: 31 (P), 812 (F); DF4B: 585 (P), 4006 (F); DF4C: 2 (P), 845 (F); DF4D: 1339; DF4DD: 238; DF4DF: 25; DF4DJ: 2; DF4E: 16; CKD4A: 2
Specifications
- Configuration
  - AAR: C-C; A1A-A1A (DF4C 5274 & 5275)
- Gauge: 1,435 mm (4 ft 8 1/2 in) standard gauge
- Wheel diameter: 1,050 mm (41.34 in)
- Minimum curve: 145 m (475.7 ft)
- Wheelbase
  - Bogie: 1,800 mm (70 7/8 in)
- Length: 19,990 mm (65 ft 7 in)
- Width: 3,309 mm (10 ft 10 1/4 in)
- Height: 4,500 mm (14 ft 9 1/8 in)
- Axle load: 23 t (23 long tons; 25 short tons)
- Loco weight: 138 t (136 long tons; 152 short tons)
- Fuel type: Diesel
- Fuel capacity: 9,000 L (2,400 US gal; 2,000 imp gal)
- Prime mover: 16V240ZJ
- Engine type: V16 diesel
- Generator: TQFR-3000 |DF4C/D
- Traction motors: 6 x ZQDR-410
  - Rating 1 hour: 320 kW (430 hp)
- Transmission: Electric (AC-DC); DF4DJ: AC-DC-AC
- Loco brake: Straight air and dynamic
- Train brakes: JZ-7 Air
Performance figures
- Maximum speed: 120 km/h (75 mph) (P); 100 km/h (62 mph) (F)
- Power output: 2,650 kW (3,550 hp)
- Tractive effort
  - Continuous: 243 kN (55,000 lbf) (P); 302 kN (68,000 lbf) (F)
Career
- Operators: China Railway (DF4/A/B/C/D/E); (North Korea) Korean State Railway (DF4A/B/D, CKD4A) (Indonesia); Indonesia-China HSR (DF4D (CC207))
- Numbers: DF4 0001 - 0108

The Dongfeng 4 (Chinese: 东风4) is a type of diesel–electric locomotive which is used in the People's Republic of China. The DF4 began trial production in 1969 at the Dalian Locomotive and Rolling Stock Works (CRRC Dalian), before entering batch production in July 1974. The DF4 is part of a larger series of Dongfeng electric-drive diesel locomotives, which began with the Dongfeng in 1958, and includes the subsequent models numbered DF2 through DF11. The Dongfeng type locomotive was the first domestically manufactured AC-DC electric transmission diesel locomotive in China. According to a statement by the National Railway Administration of China in 2024, the DF4 is set to operate on China Railways until 2035.

== Predecessor Models ==
=== ND-Dongfeng Diesel Locomotive ===
The initial development of the Dongfeng 4 diesel locomotive began with the earlier ND or Julong (巨龙, Giant Dragon) locomotive prototype. The ND, alongside the NY1, were designed and trial produced by Soviet-trained technicians from the Dalian Locomotive and Rolling Stock Works (CRRC Dalian) between 1956 and 1957. These two models were based on the Soviet TE3 DC electric-diesel locomotive, which was first introduced in 1953. [2] These locomotives featured a 10-cylinder opposed piston engine called the 10E207. The 10E207 engine was a copy of the Soviet 2D100 engine design which itself was a replica of the American Fairbanks-Morse 38 8-1/8 engine.

In August 1966, as per the instructions of the state operated Ministry of Railways, the ND-type diesel locomotives were renamed to "Dongfeng," (东风) meaning "East Wind," following a larger shift towards revolutionary names across Chinese society during the Cultural Revolution. The name change of the ND was first implemented with the locomotive car number ND-0025 and soon would be seen across all post-1966 ND-type locomotives. Dongfeng-1201 was the first official locomotive to be manufactured under the name. DF-1656 and DF-1657 were then the first of the fleet to be converted to passenger service. In 1972, alongside further testing of the 16V240J engine, the 12V180, 12V240, and 16V200 diesel engines were also trial produced for application in domestic locomotive development.

The Dongfeng locomotive had a nominal power of 1500kW and a maximum speed of 100km per hour. The Dongfeng also had a Co-Co axle arrangement and a DC-DC electric transmission.

=== Dongfeng 2 ===
Originally labelled as the ND2, the Dongfeng 2 diesel locomotive was China's first move into the manufacturing of shunting diesel locomotives. It began development by the Qishuyan Locomotive and Rolling Stock Works (CRRC Qishuyan) in 1964, based on the design of the first Dongfeng model. The DF2 was trial run on May 1, 1967.

=== Dongfeng 3 ===
The design of the Dongfeng 3 is near identical to that of the original ND-Dongfeng type locomotive, with only a minor difference in gear ratio from 4.41 to 3.38 and a nominal power reduction to 1050kW. Running alongside the later DF4, the DF3 operated on China Railway's mainline for both passenger and freight trains.

== Dongfeng 4 ==
The Dongfeng 4 diesel locomotive is a high-power diesel locomotive that began trial production at the Dalian Locomotive and Rolling Stock Works in 1969 and entered mainline production in 1974. The first 108 DF4 locomotives were built using the 16V240ZJ engine, a design introduced by the Soviets and adapted from American blueprints. The DF4 underwent several redevelopment phases before the finalized DF4B was introduced in 1982. In 1972, alongside further testing of the 16V240J engine, the 12V180, 12V240, and 16V200 diesel engines were also trial produced for application in domestic locomotive development. There are multiple other derivative sub-models of the DF4, including the DF4C and DF4E. The standard DF4 was used for China Railway's mainline passenger and freight operations. The locomotive had a top speed of 120 km/h and a power output of 2650kW. The DF4 uses standard gauge and has a Co-Co axel arrangement.

Few of the early series DF4 are still in operation. The first operational DF4 is a permanent exhibition at the Beijing Railway Museum and remembered for its all-female crew.

== Derivative Models ==
=== DF4A ===
The DF4A began production in 1976 with locomotive number 0109 and continued to be manufactured until 1984. The DF4A is an unofficial designation of the DF4 locomotive that uses a revised 16V20ZJ engine. There is no visible indicator to differentiate the DF4 and DF4A as the use of the 16V20ZJA engine is the only thing that distinguishes the two models.

Specification	Details
Series	DF4A
Builder	CRRC Dalian; CRRC Ziyang
Years	1973–1984
Fleet Numbers	0109–0770 (F) 2001–2031 (P)
Top speed	120 km/h
Gauge	1435 mm
UIC classification	Co'Co'
Prime mover	16V240ZJ
Length	21.1 m
Width	3.31 m
Height	4.75 m
Weight	138 t
Axle load	23 t
Power output	2650 kW
Tractive effort	328 kN

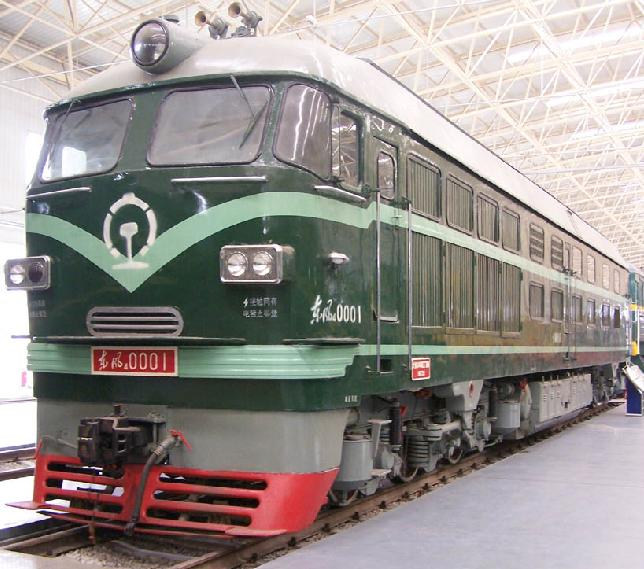
DF_{4} 0001 at the Beijing Railway Museum

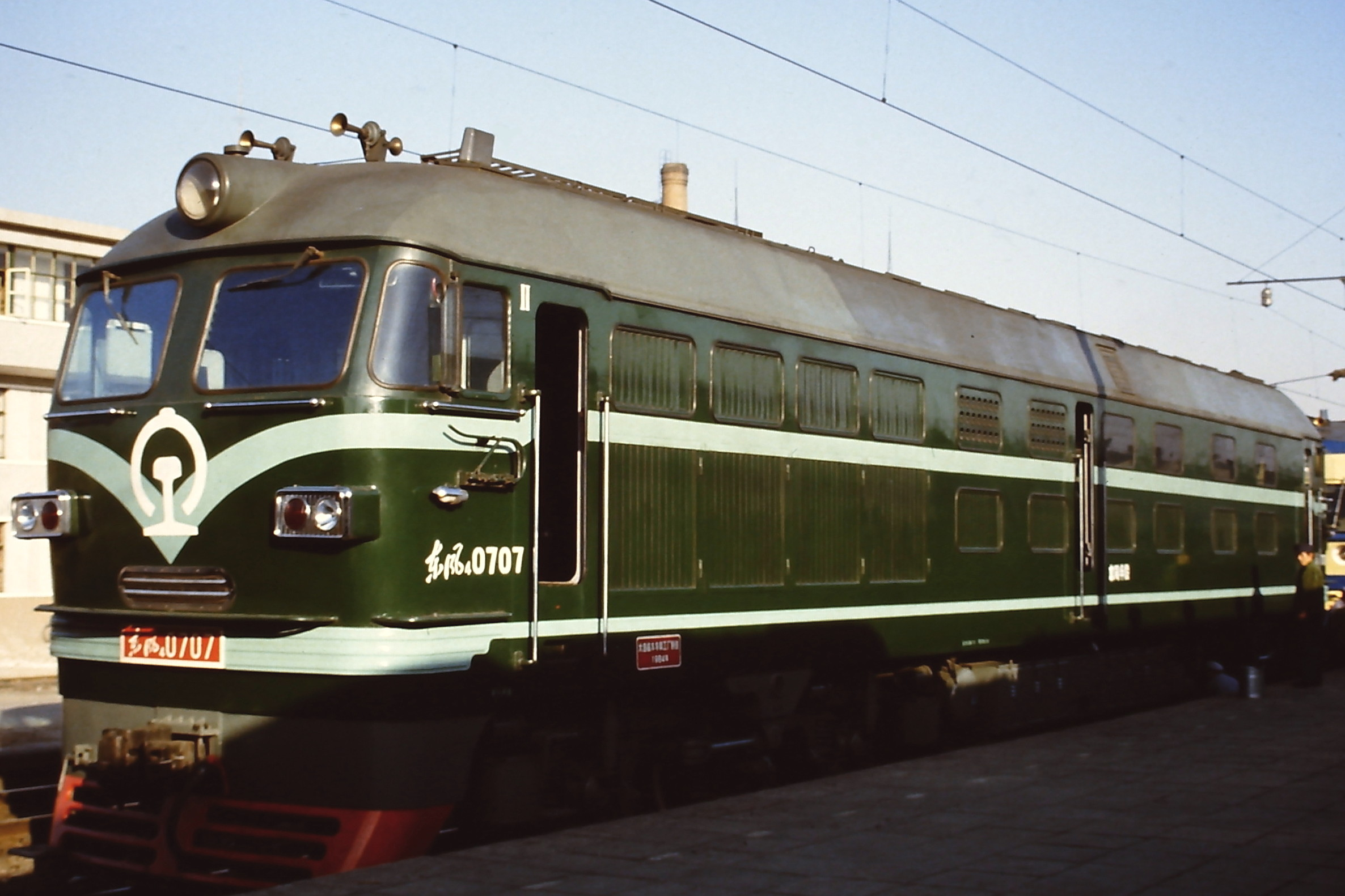
DF_{4} locomotive

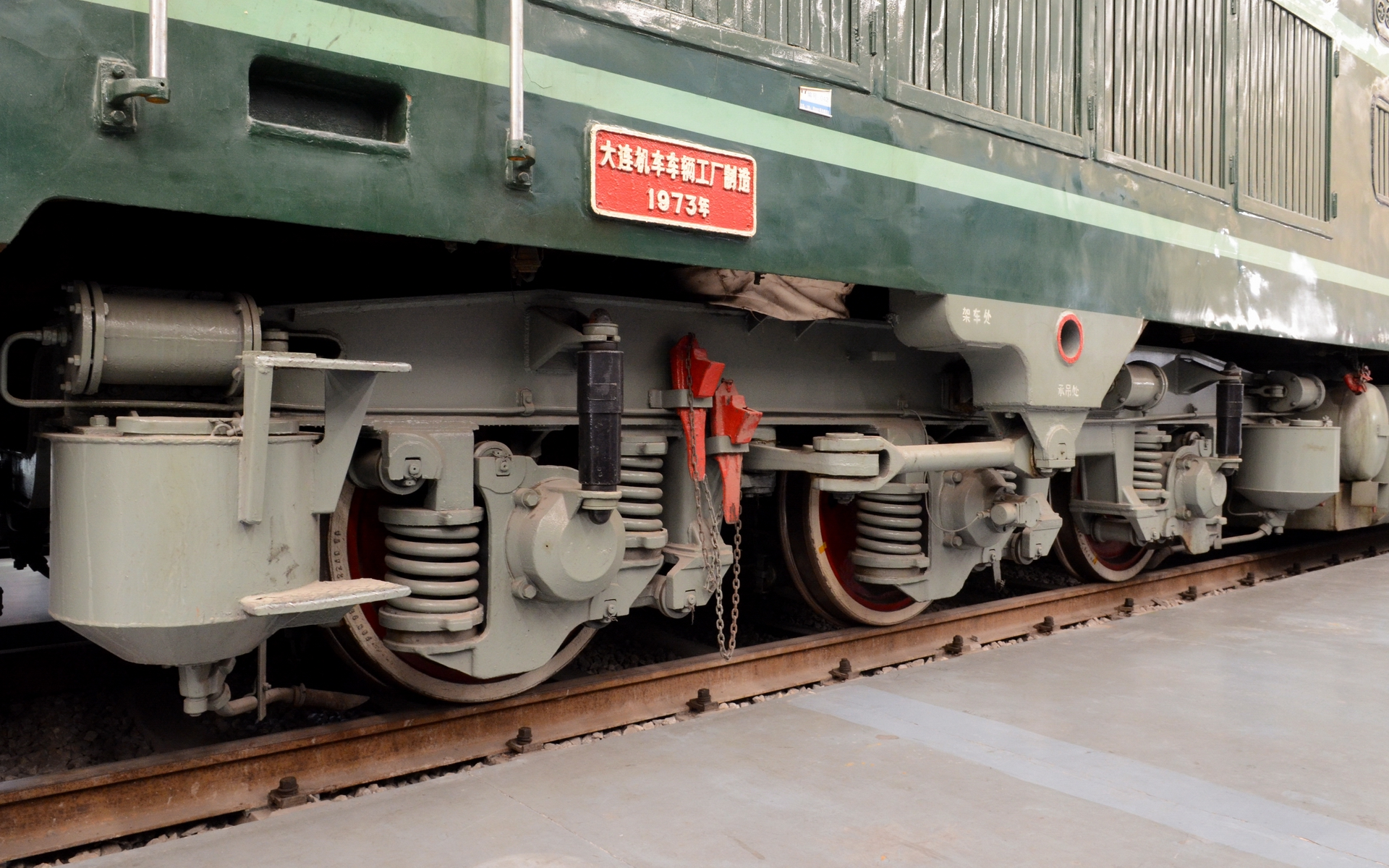
The bogie and manufacturer's number plate on the body of DF4-0001.

==== DF4B ====
The DF4B was the first officially designated DF4 model upgrade. The DF4B could be seen in 3 color variants: green, blue, and orange. These locomotives were colloquially nicknamed "Watermelon" (西瓜), "Officer" (武警), and "Orange" (橘子). The "Watermelon" and "Officer" were used for freight traffic, while "Oranges" (DF4 2000 series) were manufactured with an alternate gear ratio for increased operation speed and were for passenger use. Beyond colorways, the DF4B were similar to the standard DF4, apart from an improved 16V240ZJB engine and, in some instances, modified engine inlet filters. Production of the DF4B began in Dalian in 1984 and was the most common of the Dongfeng series.

Specification	Details
Series	DF4B
Builder	CRRC Dalian; CRRC Datong; CRRC Sifang; CRRC Ziyang
Year	1982
Fleet Numbers	1001–1999, 6001–6587, 7001–7800, 9001–9702 (F) 2101 - 2685 (P)
Top speed	120 km/h
Gauge	1435 mm
UIC classification	Co'Co'
Prime mover	16V240ZJB
Length	21.1 m
Width	3.31 m
Height	4.75 m
Weight	138 t
Axle load	23 t
Power output	2650 kW
Tractive effort	328 kN

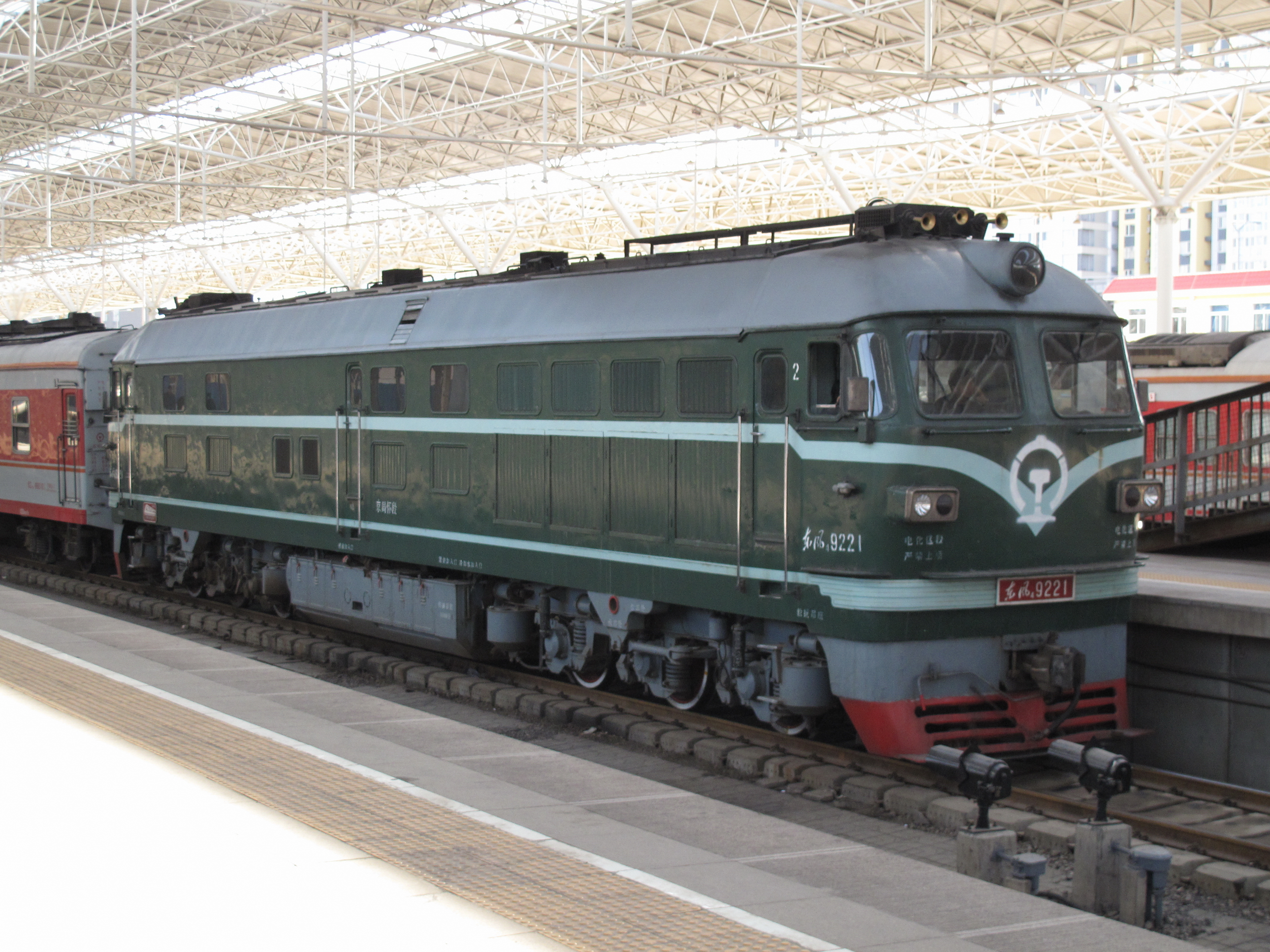
DF_{4}B locomotive

==== DF4C ====
The DF4C's intended purpose was to replace the DF4B as the main diesel locomotive in China and comes with several improvements, including a new engine revision (16240ZJC). The first DF4C was produced in 1985 and batch production started four years later, in 1989, and lasted until roughly the end of the 20th century. The first two DF4C (4001 and 4002) produced in 1985 continued the use of the DF4B hull. A new hull design is applied for the batch-produced configuration.

The DF4C comes in a different color scheme than the previous DF4's, namely dark blue and later light blue and beige. The passenger version, informally called DF4CK, has an A1A-A1A wheel arrangement.

Specification	Details
Series	DF4C
Builder	CRRC Dalian; CRRC Datong; CRRC Sifang; CRRC Ziyang
Years	1985–1999
Fleet Numbers	0001–0040, 4001–4465, 5001–5273 (F) 4466, 5274–5275 (P)
Top speed	100 km/h
Gauge	1435 mm
UIC classification	Co'Co'
Prime mover	16V240ZJC
Length	21.1 m
Width	3.31 m
Height	4.75 m
Weight	138 t
Axle load	23 t
Power output	2650 kW
Tractive effort	328 kN

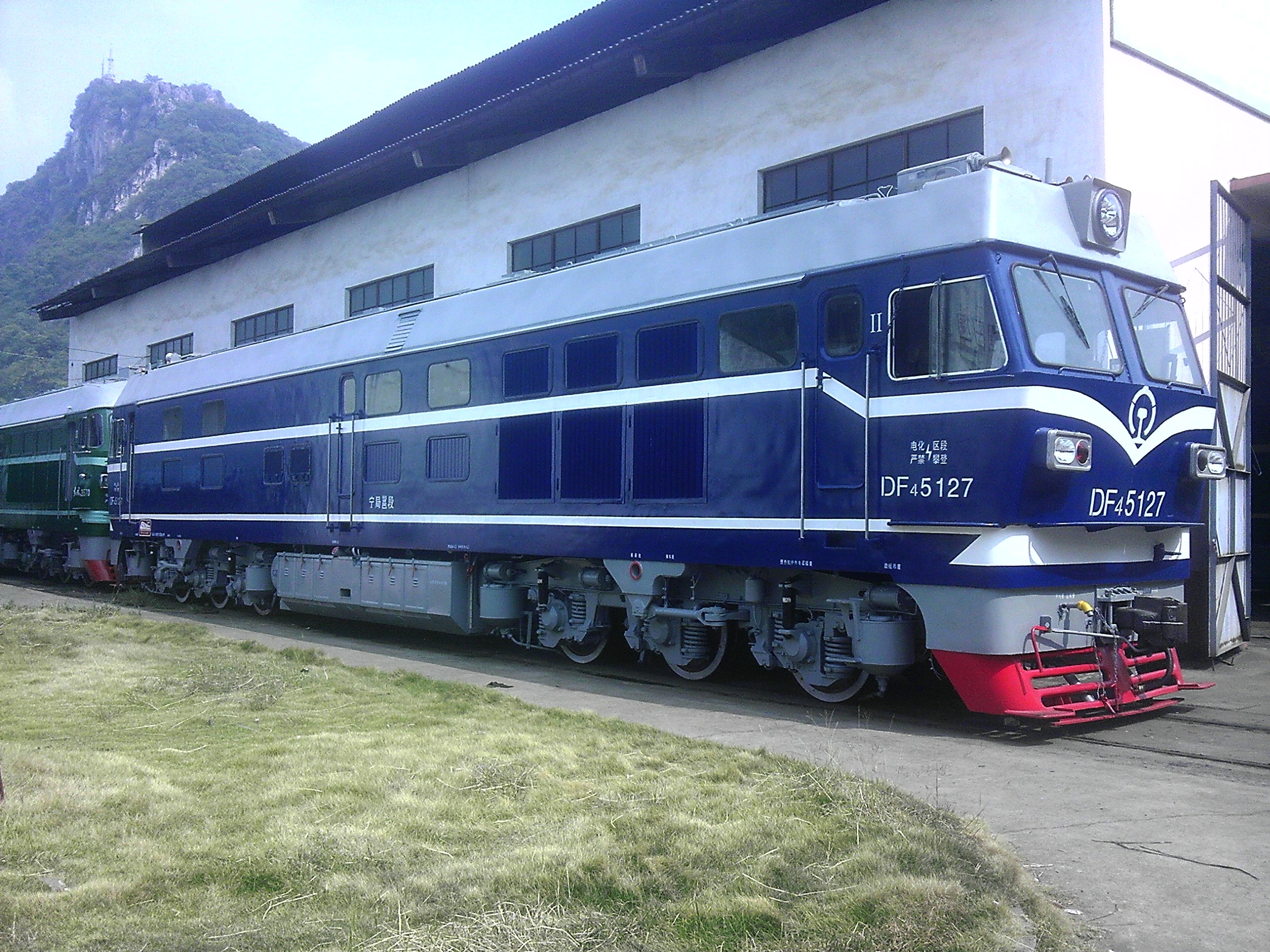
DF_{4}C locomotive

==== DF4D ====
The DF4D, the most recent DF4 revision, has been produced since 1996 with the 16V240ZJD engine. The passenger versions increased top speed to 145 km/h (90 mph) or 170 km/h (110 mph). The freight version comes in a different color scheme than the previous DF4Ds, namely green (7000 Series) and later light blue (4000 Series) and yellow. The green version sat on radial bogies but later converted to standard bogies. Their top speed to 100 km/h (62 mph). DF4D-7000 series are configured with shorter hull compared to standard DF4D series. he DF4DJ, originally DF4DAC, of which only 2 were built had AC drive technology supplied by Siemens. They were China's first AC drive diesel locomotive.

The DF4DJ, originally DF4DAC, of which only 2 were built, had AC drive technology supplied by Siemens. They were China's first AC drive diesel locomotive.

The DF4DD was a road switcher version of the DF4 with side walkways and a full-body cab similar to modern American locomotives. The type was the most powerful road switcher class in China until the introduction of the HXN3B and HXN5B classes.

Specification	Details
Series	DF4D, DF4DJ, DF4DD, DF4DF
Builder	CRRC Dalian
Years	1996–2018
Fleet Numbers	DF4D 0001–0240, 0243–0347, 0353–0529 (P) 0241–0242, 0348, 1893, 4001–4354, 7001–7012 (F) DF4D 3001–3340 (HS) DF4DJ 0001–0002 DF4DD 0030, 0029, 1001–1029, 4180–4187 DF4DF 0349–0352, 0530–0531, 4034–4169
Top speed	145 km/h
Gauge	1435 mm
UIC classification	Co'Co'
Prime mover	16V240ZJD/ZJE/ZJF
Length	21.1 m
Width	3.31 m
Height	4.75 m
Weight	138 t
Power output	2940 kW

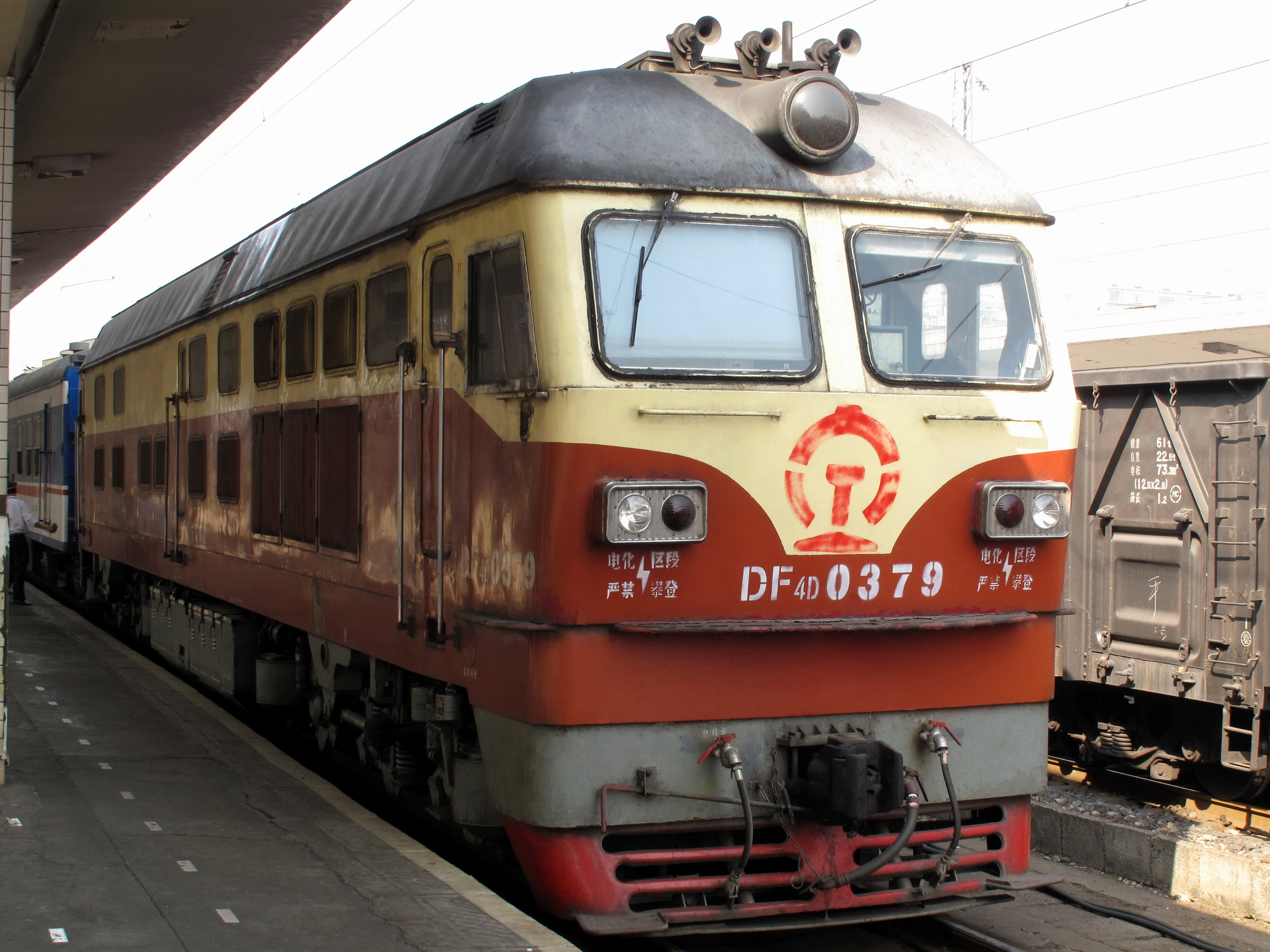
DF_{4}D(0000 Series) locomotive

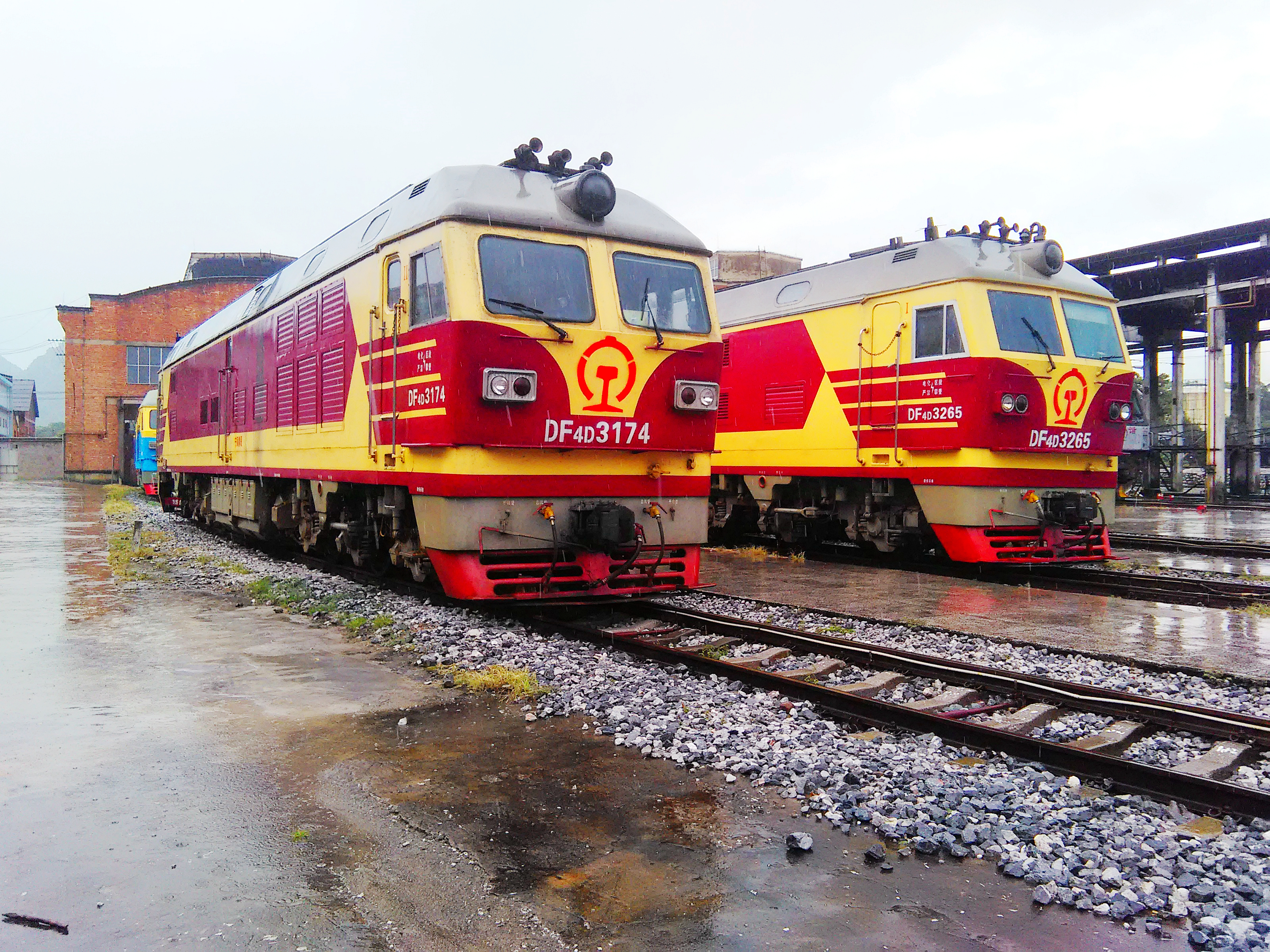
DF_{4}D(3000 Series) locomotive

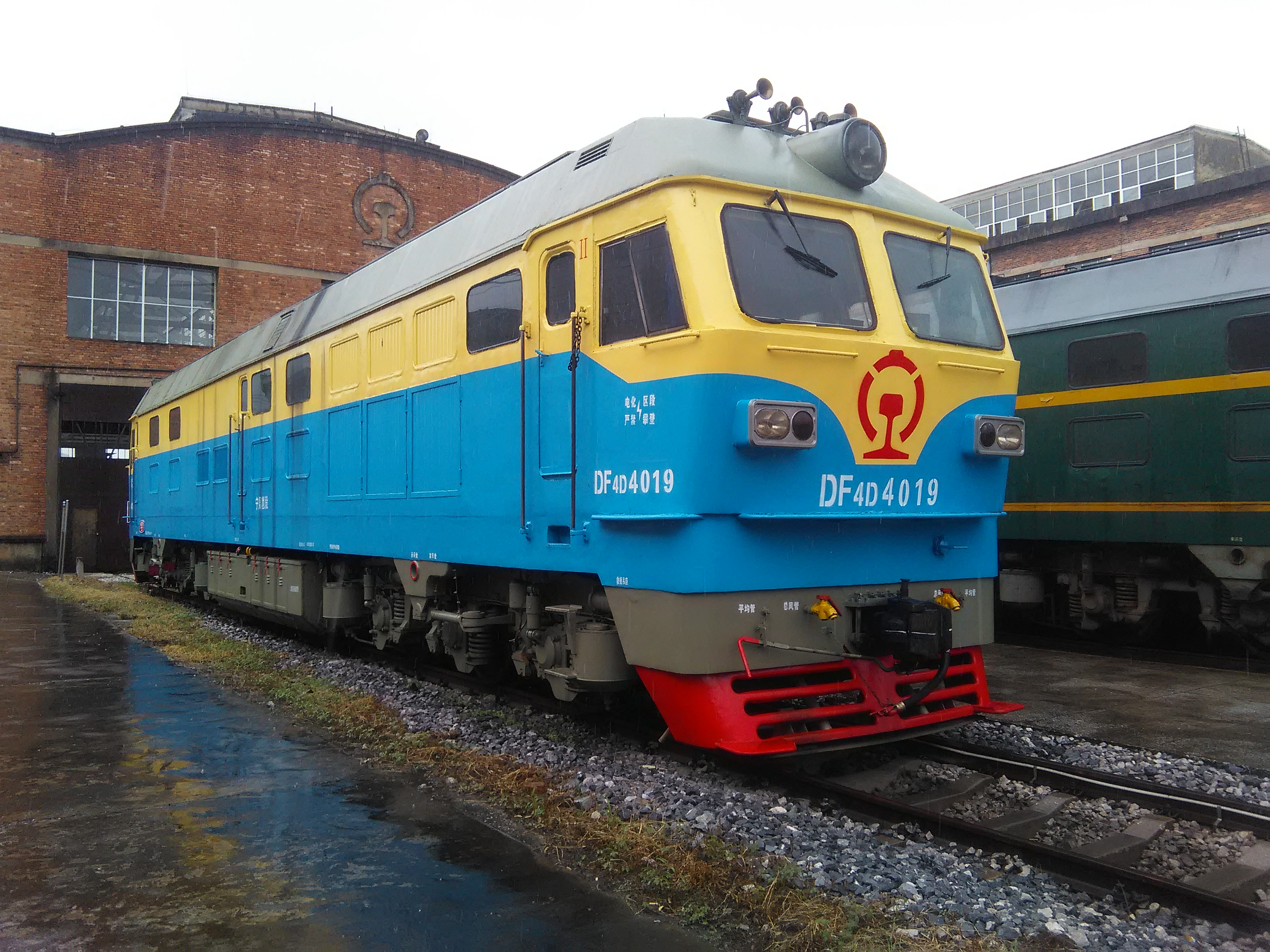
DF_{4}D(4000 Series) locomotive

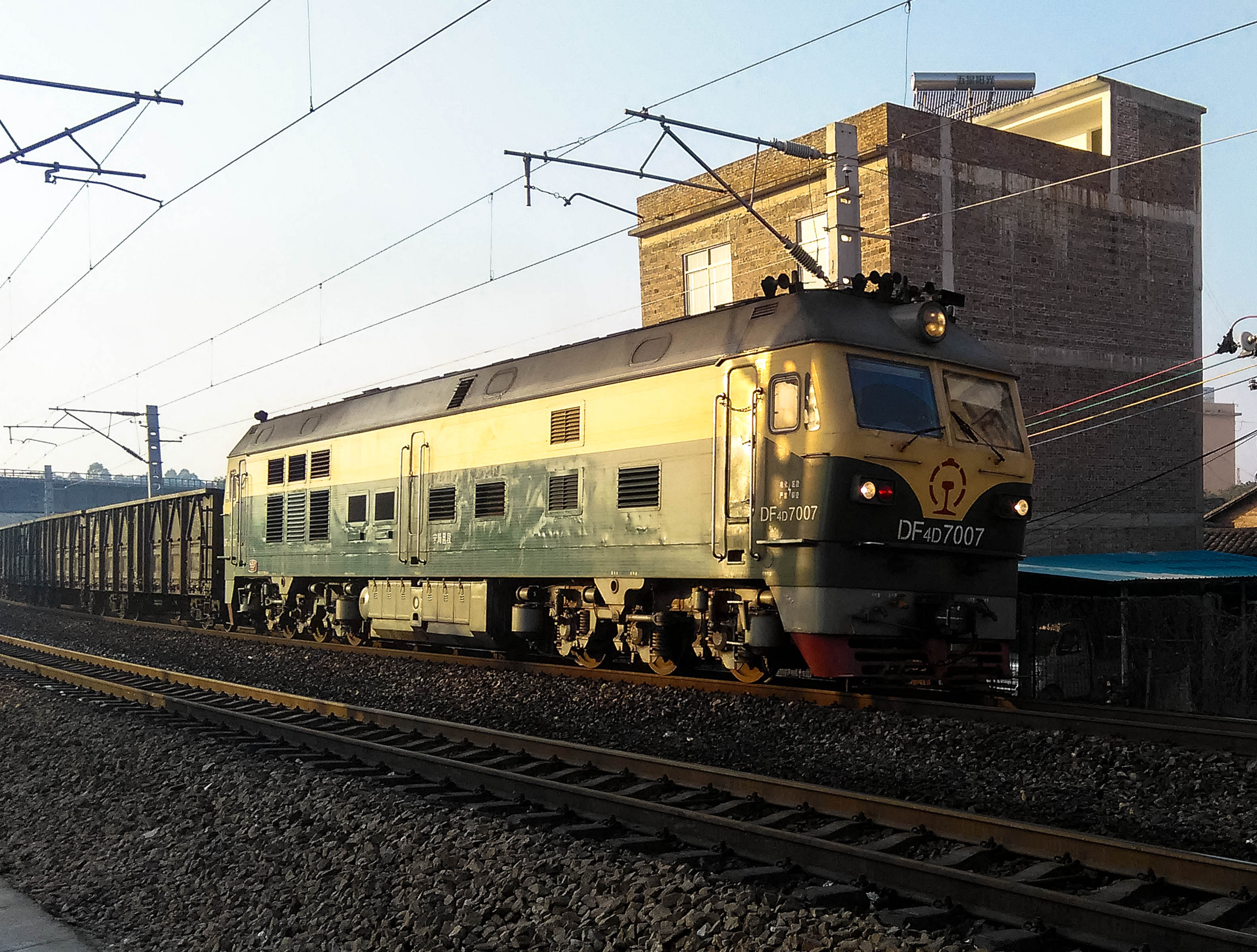
DF_{4}D(7000 Series) locomotive

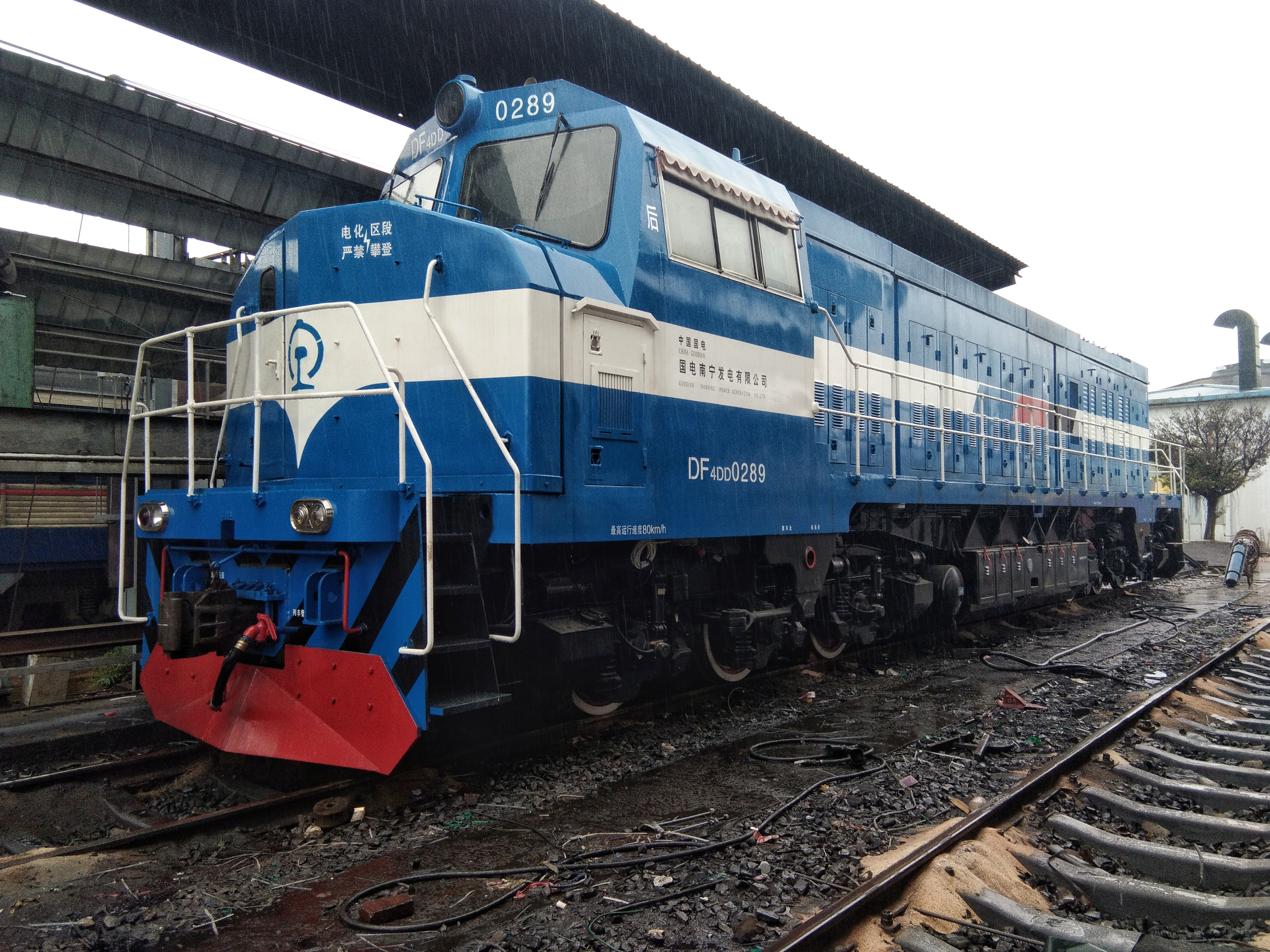
DF_{4}DD locomotive

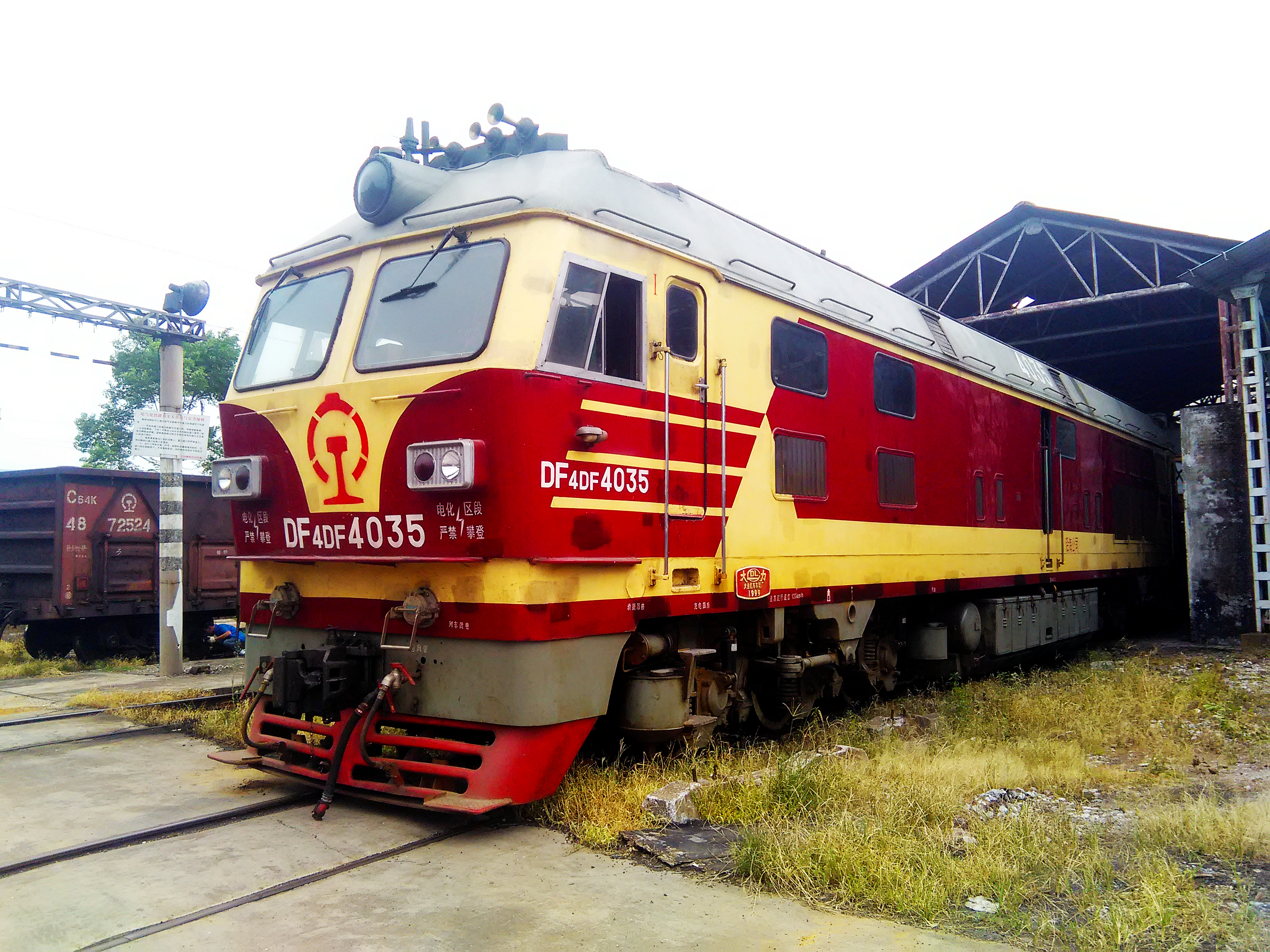
DF_{4}DF locomotive which supports head-end power

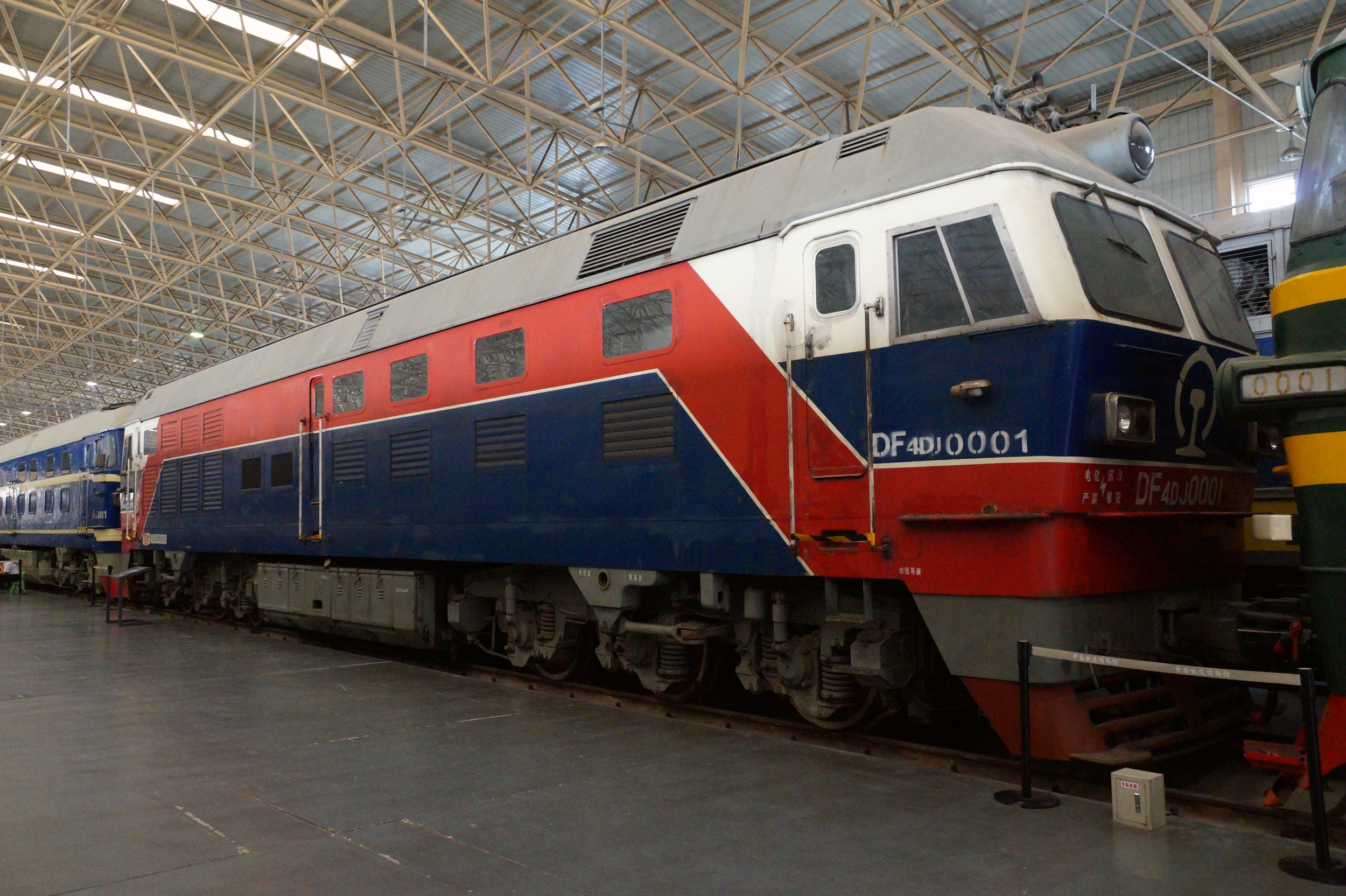
DF_{4}DJ locomotive

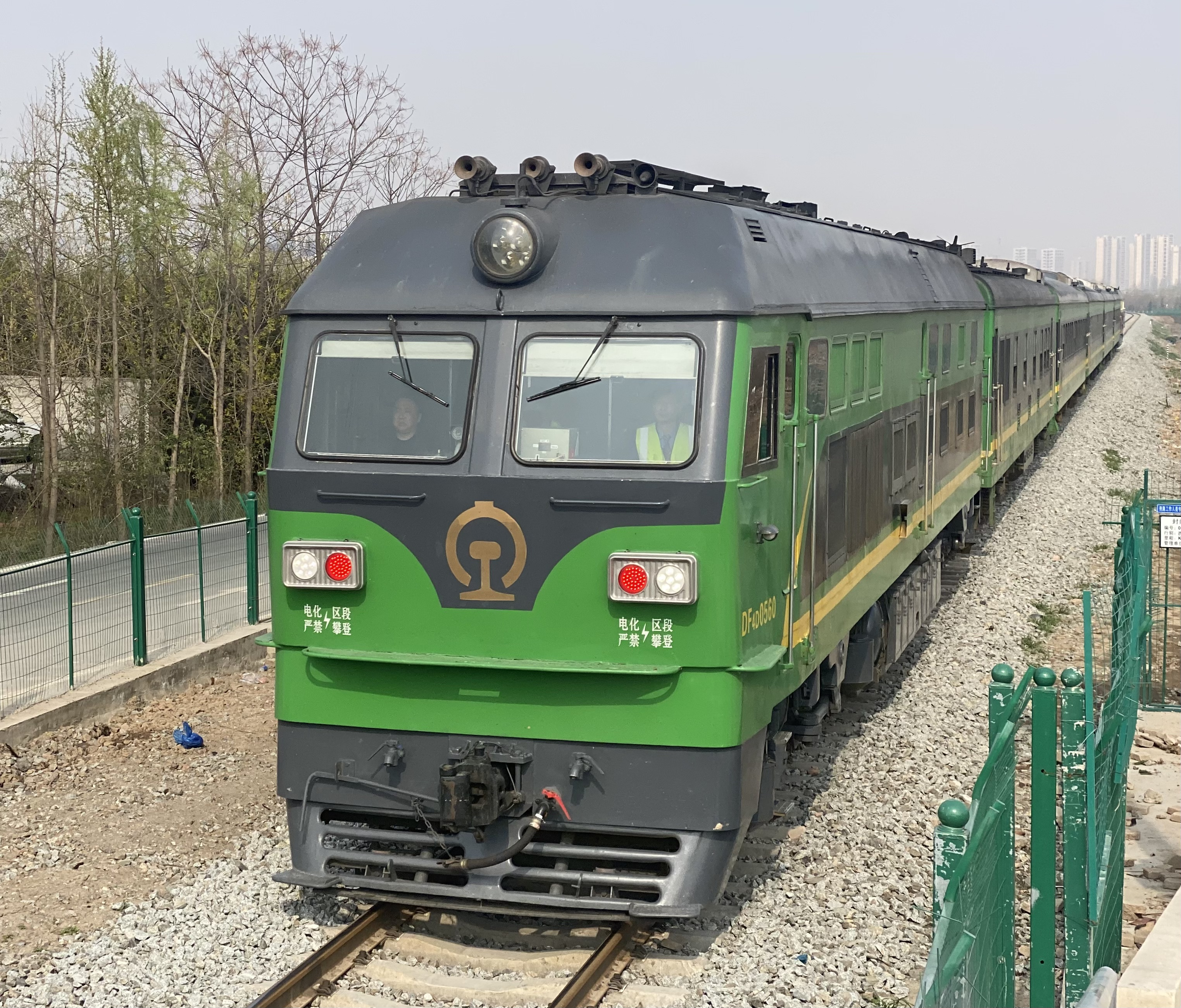
DF_{4}D-0560 on Xi'an–Huyi railway

==== DF4E ====
The DF4E is a 2 unit locomotive of total power 4.86MW (2x2.43MW)

Specification	Details
Series	DF4E
Builder	CRRC Sifang
Years	1994–1997
Fleet Numbers	0001–0016
Top speed	100 km/h
Gauge	1435 mm (standard gauge)
UIC classification	C-C+C-C
Prime mover	16V240ZJB (×2)
Length	41.3 m
Weight	304 t
Axle load	25 t
Power output	4860 kW
Tractive effort	870 kN

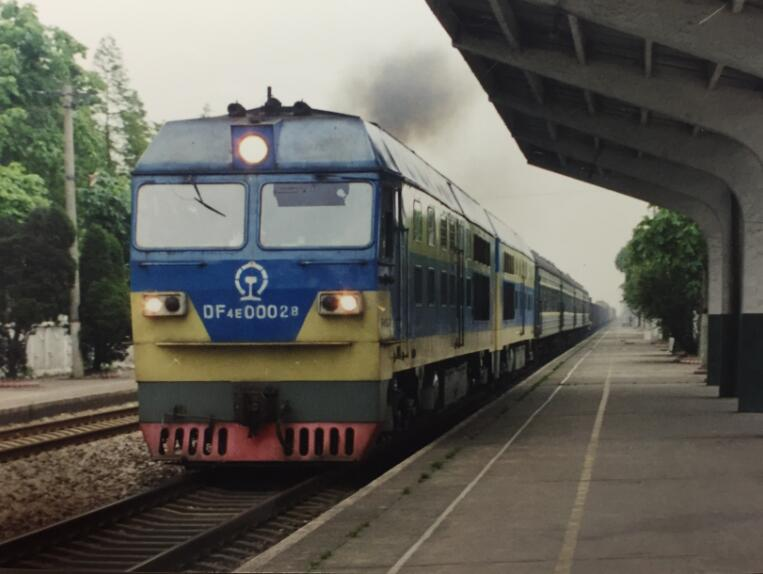
DF_{4}E locomotive

== Technical Features ==
=== Overall Layout ===
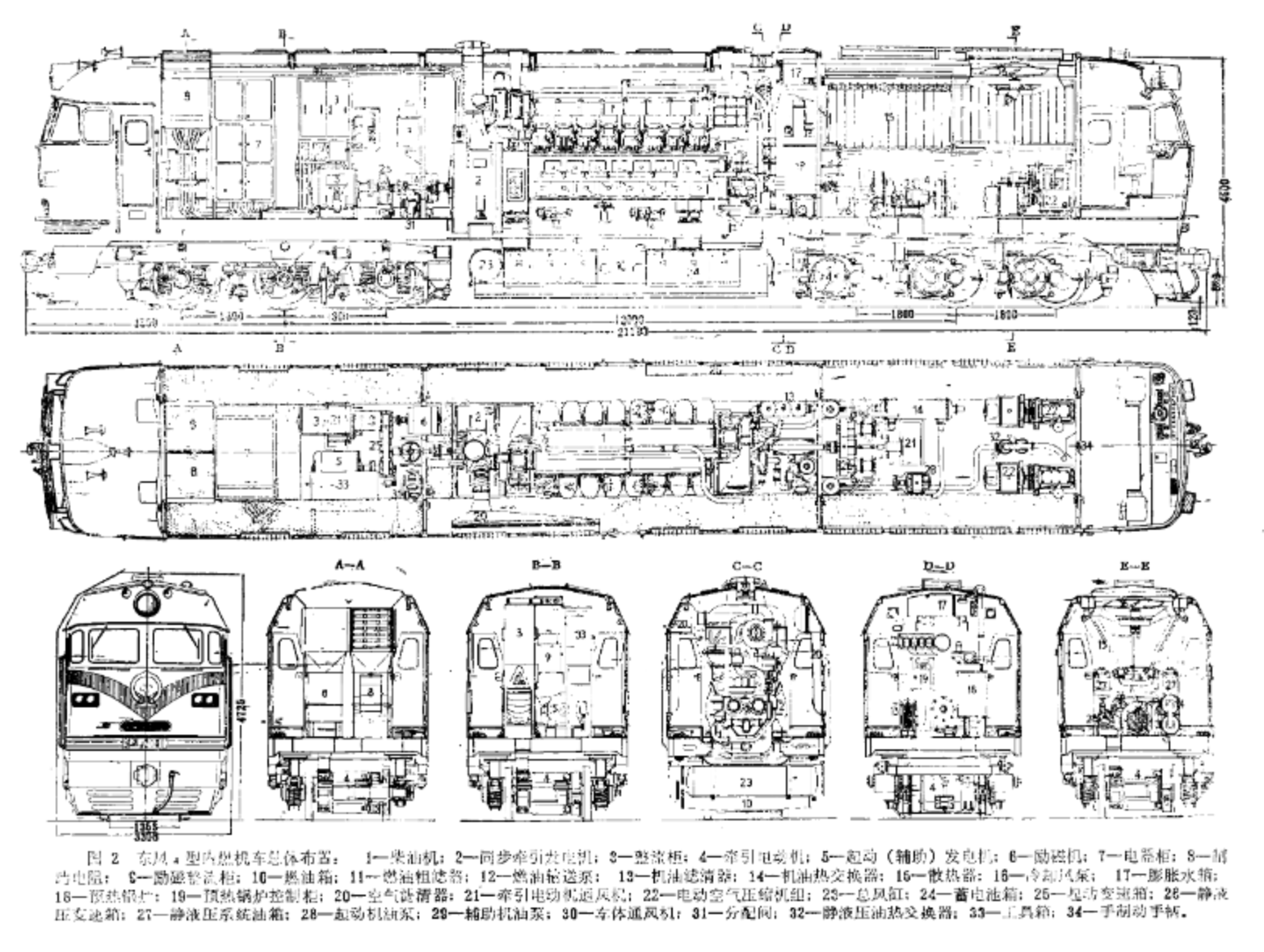
Dongfeng 4 blueprints showing the locomotive compartments.

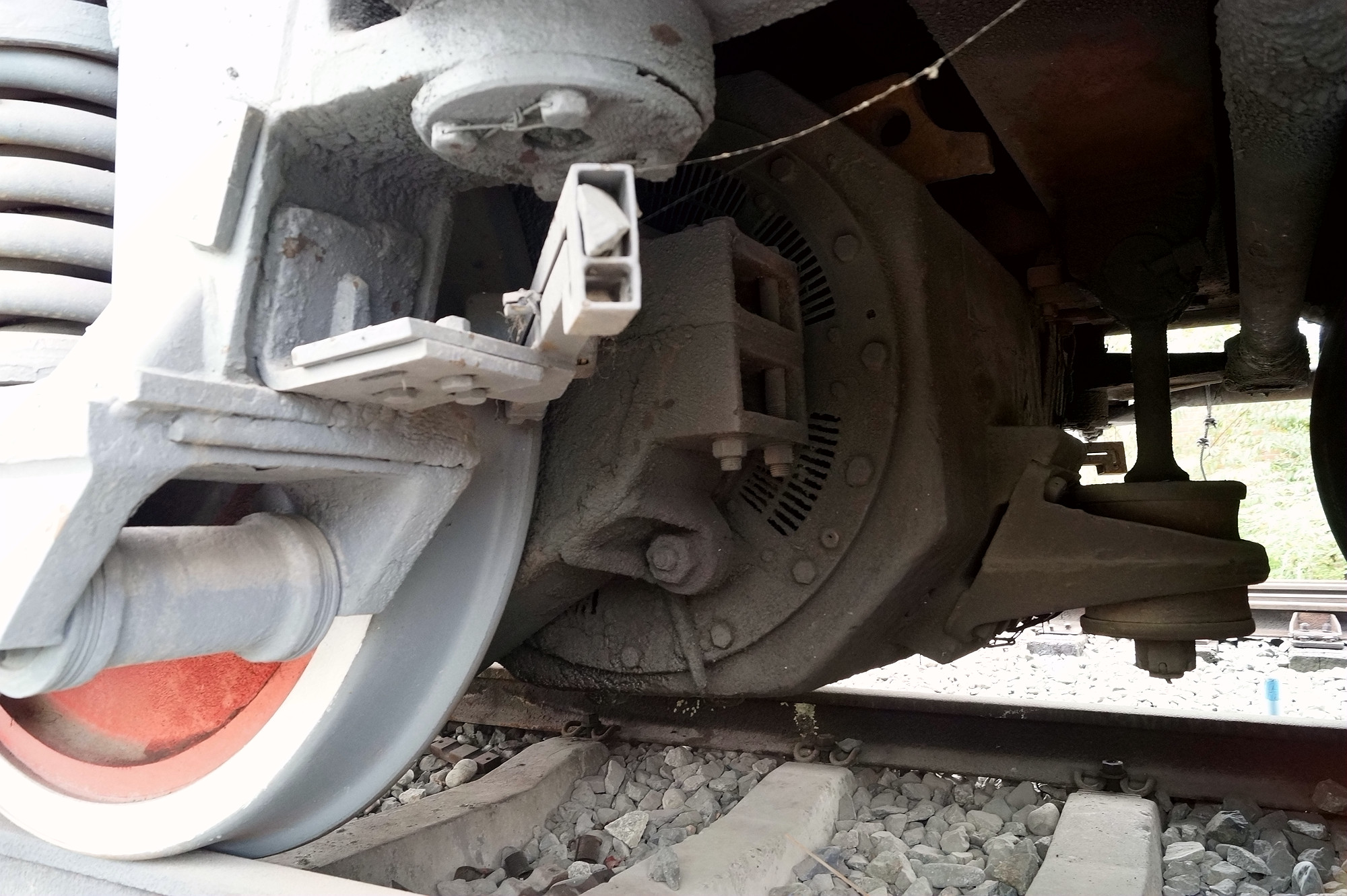
ZQDR-410 traction motor used by China Railways DF4/DF4B diesel locomotives.

The Dongfeng 4 locomotive uses an AC-DC diesel-electric transmission, in which a diesel engine drives an alternator that supplies electricity to traction motors mounted on the train bogies. The locomotive body is divided into five sections: two driver's cabs, an electric equipment compartment, a central engine room, and a cooling equipment compartment. The locomotive has walkways along the sides of the internal compartments for maintenance access. Interior bulkheads separate the cab, engine room, and electrical equipment areas to reduce noise and limit the risk of fire. The DFs were intended to be used in pairs so that the train could operate bi-directionally. However, Dongfeng locomotives often worked individually, using the pre-existing steam locomotive infrastructure, such as wyes, to operate.

=== Driver's Compartment ===
The DF4 locomotive has separate driver's compartments found both at the front and rear ends of the vehicle. The two driver's compartments are identical in layout and allow the locomotive to operate in either direction without turning. Each compartment contains the driver's control stand with throttle controller, automatic and independent brake controls, signal display, monitoring instruments, communication equipment, and the driver and auxiliary seating. Some earlier DF driver's cabs also feature a hot plate.

=== Engine Room ===
The engine room is located in the centre of the locomotive and contains the DF4's main propulsion equipment. Major components of the engine room are the diesel engine, main alternator, auxiliary generator for onboard electrical systems, fuel pumps and fuel filtration equipment, lubricating oil pumps and filters, air compressors for the braking system, cooling water pumps and piping, and engine air intake filters. Here, engine exhaust would have been discharged through vents on the roof of the locomotive. These ventilation fans and ducts provided airflow through the engine to maintain satisfactory operating temperatures.

=== Electrical Compartment ===
The electrical compartment contained the main control systems and power conversion equipment such as the traction control cabinets, control systems for the main alternator, rectifiers that convert AC currents to DC for traction motors, monitoring systems, and auxiliary power distribution panels. Additionally, the electric resistance braking device is installed in the front of the electrical compartment and consists of resistor grids and a fan. During braking, the traction motors dissipate braking energy in the form of heat through these resistor grids. Air is then be drawn through the resistor banks and exhausted through vents located on the roof of the locomotive.

=== Cooling Compartment ===
The cooling equipment compartment is located between the engine room and one of the driver's cabs. This section contains the radiator assemblies and cooling fans used to remove heat from the engine's water and oil systems.

=== Fuel Tank and Running Gear ===
The DF4's fuel tank is mounted beneath the centre of the locomotive. Other underframe components include air reservoirs, piping for the braking system, and electrical conduits. The locomotive runs on two three-axle bogies with a Co-Co wheel arrangement. Each axle is driven by an electric traction motor on the bogie frame and connected to the axle through reduction gearing. The bogies also contain speed sensors used by the locomotive's speedometer and control systems.

=== Gearing variations ===
The DF4, DF4B and DF4C were each produced with two different gear ratios, "passenger" (up to 120 km/h or 75 mph or 170 km/h or 110 mph for DF4C) and "freight" (up to 100 km/h or 62 mph). The passenger variant was often painted orange.

== Manufacturers ==
The DF4's have been manufactured by several companies:

- Dalian Locomotive and Rolling Stock Works (CRRC Dalian): DF4/A/B/C/D/DD/DF, CKD4A
- Datong Locomotive and Rolling Stock Works (CRRC Datong): DF4B/C
- Sifang Locomotive and Rolling Stock Works (CRRC Sifang): DF4B/C/E
- Ziyang Locomotive and Rolling Stock Works (CRRC Ziyang): DF4B, DF4C & DF4C
- Siemens: DF4DJ

== Cultural Revolution ==
=== Interruptions to the Development Phase ===
Developing contemporaneously with the Cultural Revolution, the Dongfeng diesel locomotive had a prolonged development phase that lasted from 1958 until 1984, with significant technical difficulties as a result of material scarcity and a lack of technical expertise following the "Down to the Countryside" campaign. In 1969, the Dalian Locomotive and Rolling Stock Works began to trial produce the Dongfeng 4 diesel locomotive. Unlike the standard DF4 design, the first DF4 protype featured a three-panel windshield rather than the standard two-panel and displayed an emblem of Mao Zedong on the nose of the driver’s cab. Despite being publicized in September of 1969, it was not until the mid 1970s that the DF4 locomotive was integrated into mainline operations.

Despite some success with the application of the locomotive, unstable conditions in the general production of the DF4 resulted in frequent mechanical and electrical malfunctions during operations. At this time, the Kunming Diesel Locomotive Depot wrote in the journal Diesel Locomotives that, "Improving locomotive quality is necessary to ensure the continuation of railway transportation, to meet national defence needs, and to accelerate socialist construction. Improving locomotive quality is the shared responsibility of factories, research institutions, maintenance personnel, and locomotive crews." The DF4 became fully operational in 1984.

=== Revolutionary Naming System ===
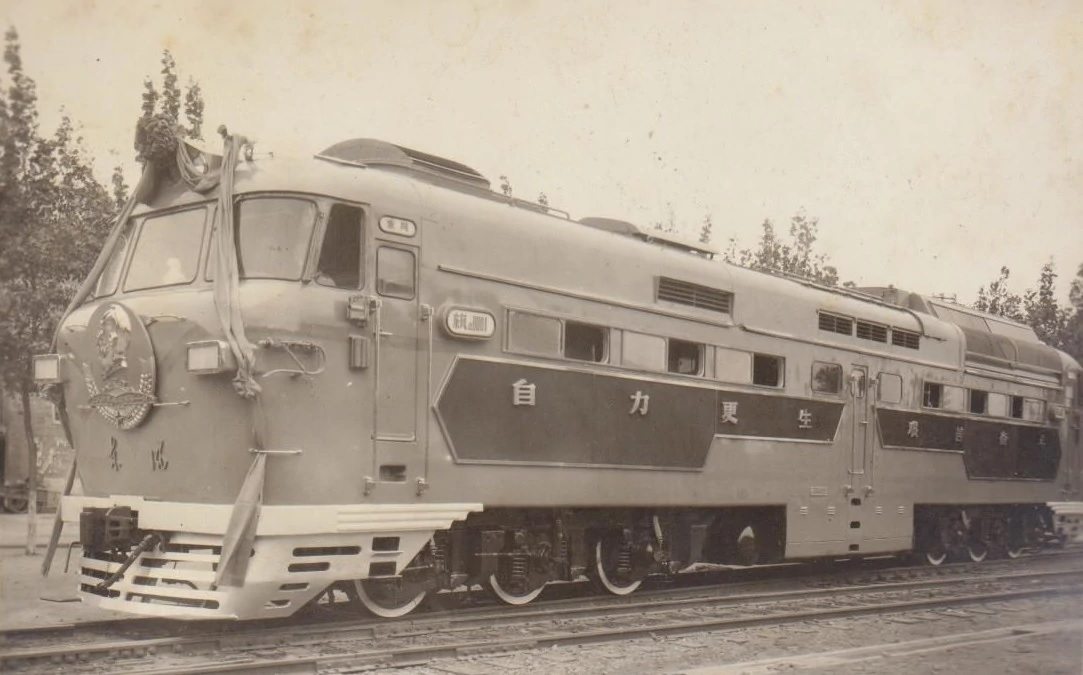
The first DF4 locomotive, featuring an emblem of Mao Zedong, 1969

Following the broader trend of revolutionary namesakes, individual DF4 locomotives could be seen taking on the personas of various Chinese Communist Party figures such as Mao Zedong, Zhou Enlai, and Zhu De. People's Liberation Army veterans also had locomotives named in their honour, as can be found with the "Huang Jiguang" and "Lei Feng" locomotives. These locomotives often display an emblem of the revolutionary figure to whom they are named and, in some cases, feature specialized model numbers. The namesakes are often transferred to new locomotive models to emphasize China Railway's continued development.

==== Mao Zedong Locomotive ====
After the retirement of the original 1946 "Mao Zedong" locomotive, DF4-0002 took on the namesake in 1976. When the DF4B was released the name "Mao Zedong" was then transferred onto the upgraded model. This DF4B also had a specialized model number, 1893, in correspondence with the year of Mao's birth. The final Dongfeng "Mao Zedong" locomotive was a DF4D in the mid-2000s.

==== Zhou Enlai Locomotive ====
On January 5, 1978, the Ministry of Railways, with the permission of the Central Committee of the Chinese Communist Party and the State Council, named DF3-0058 of the Shanghai Locomotive Depot of the Shanghai Railway Bureau, "Zhou Enlai." In 1984, the Zhou Enlai namesake was passed along to DF4-2106 until 1997 when the DF11-1898 took on the tradition.

==== Zhu De Locomotive ====
Alongside the "Mao Zedong" and "Zhou Enlai" locomotives was the "Zhu De." The first and only Dongfeng type locomotive to be named in honour of Zhu De was DF4B number 1886. The locomotive number, 1886, stood for the year of Zhu's birth.

==== Huang Jiguang Locomotive ====
In 1986, the Huang Jiguang locomotive namesake was placed on DF4B-1220, continuing the tradition that had begun in 1956. This locomotive was named after the Chinese soldier and decorated war hero, Huang Jiguang, who sacrificed his life by blocking an enemy machine gun with his body during the Korean War. [21] On March 11, 2005, the name "Huang Jiguang" was transferred to DF8B-0177.

== North Korea ==
A Korean State Railway DF4B-1349 (내연-225) in Tumen

In 2001, the Korean State Railway purchased two locomotives of the type CKD4A (DF4D) new from CNR Dalian; these were delivered in July 2002. These are powered by the same 16V240ZJD as the Chinese DF4D, producing 2,940 kW (3,940 hp) and have a maximum speed of 100 km/h (62 mph). They are painted in the standard light blue over dark green, but their numbers are not known.

Between 2006 and 2008, three batches of refurbished second-hand DF4 ("DF4A") and DF4B were delivered to North Korea. These are numbered in the 내연200 series (내연 = Naeyŏn, "internal combustion") and are in both passenger and freight service throughout North Korea; many are assigned to the Hamhŭng area. The total number delivered is not known, but the number is at least 36 units, numbered 내연201 to 내연225 and 내연261 to 내연271. Many are still in their former Chinese paint schemes, but some have been repainted into the standard light blue over dark green, and two have received the dark green/yellow scheme applied to many M62-type diesels obtained second hand from Germany and Slovakia. There is at least one DF4D in the standard blue-over-green livery.

Number	Model	Livery	Original number
내연201	DF4B	standard	
내연203	DF4B	standard	CR DF4 1552
내연204	DF4B	CR green	
내연206	DF4B	CR green	
내연208	DF4B	standard	
내연209	DF4A	CR green	
내연211	DF4B	CR green	
내연212	DF4B	standard	
내연215	DF4B	CR green	
내연217	DF4B	CR green	
내연222	DF4B	standard	
내연223	DF4B	standard	
내연225	DF4B	standard	CR DF4 1349
내연226	DF4B	CR green	
내연261	DF4B	standard	
내연262	DF4B	green/yellow	
내연264	DF4B	standard	
내연266	DF4B	green/yellow	
내연271	DF4B	CR green	

== Indonesia ==
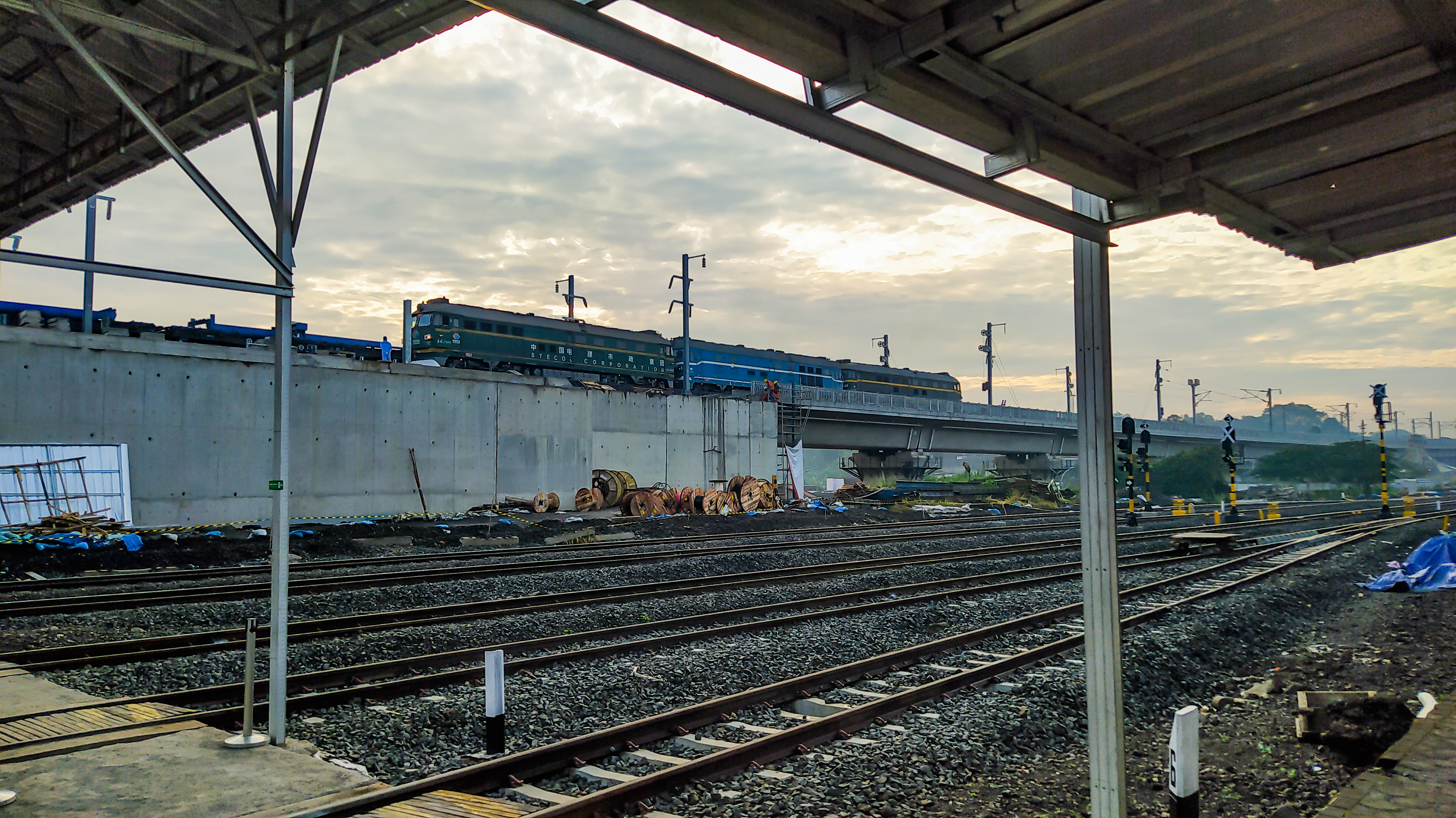
Two DF_{4}B and one DF_{4}C locomotives passing Padalarang Station, Indonesia

During the construction of Jakarta–Bandung high speed railway line, the Chinese construction company PowerChina brought and used several DF4 locomotives. The first unit, DF4B-1295, arrived at the Port of Tanjung Priok on 22 November 2021. It was transported to Tegalluar depot in Bandung on 21 January 2022. The second batch arrived on 28 January, consisted of DF4B-7552, 7553, 9129 and 7549. The third batch arrived in Tanjung Priok in December 2022, with the DF4B-6385 on 16 December and the DF4C-4151 on 31 December.

During the construction of the line, one of the DF4 was involved in an accident. The DF4B-7553 was derailed on 18 December 2022 while hauling a track-laying machine. The derailment occurred in Padalarang District, West Bandung Regency. The derailed train was evacuated on 20 December.

At the conclusion of the line construction, the PowerChina's DF4's were moved out of the country for use elsewhere. For maintenance and backup purpose, the Kereta Cepat Indonesia China (KCIC) operated a single DF4D, numbered CC207 23 01. Under the Indonesian railway nomenclature, the DF4 operated by KCIC was classified as CC207 class.

== Preservation ==
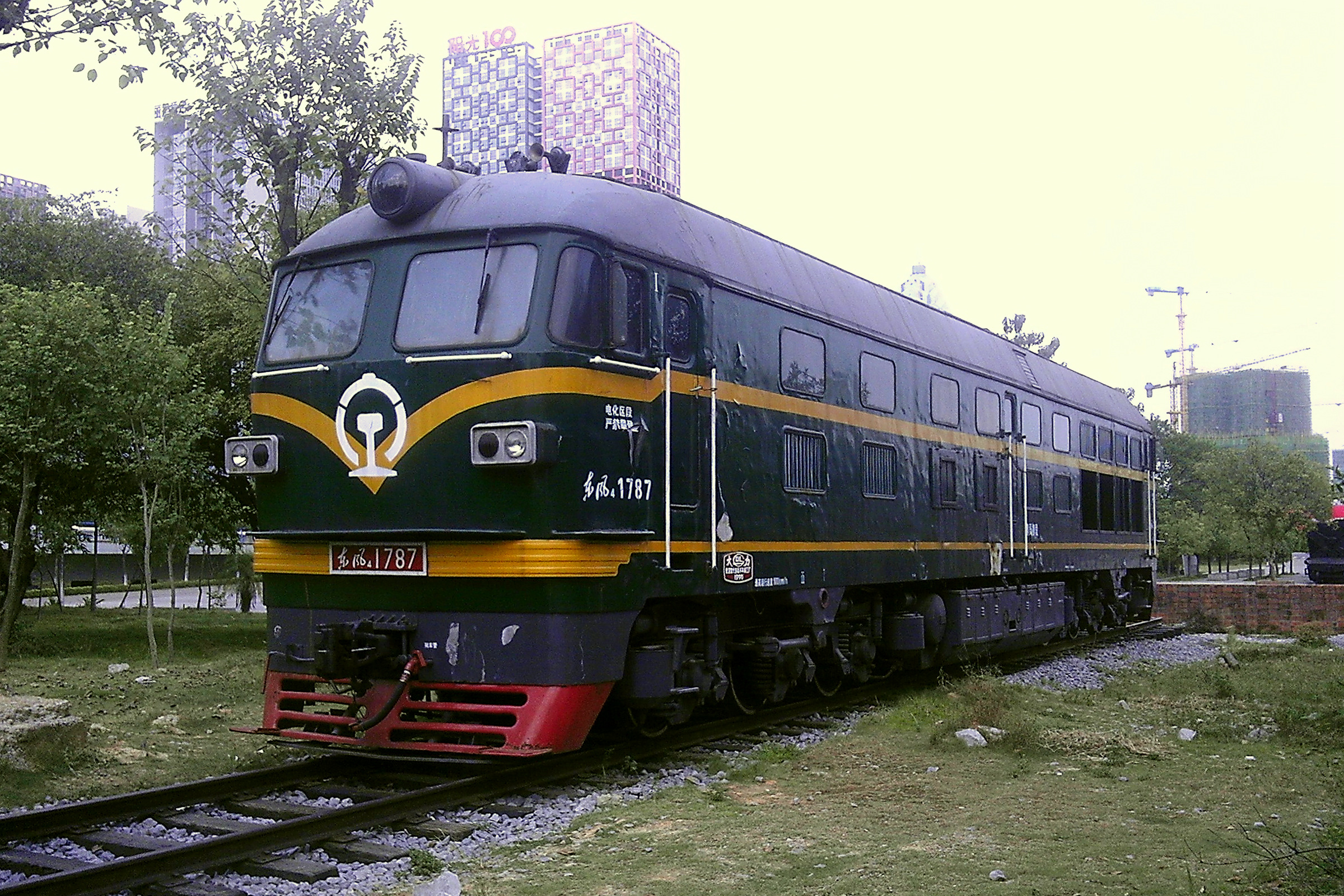
DF4B-1787

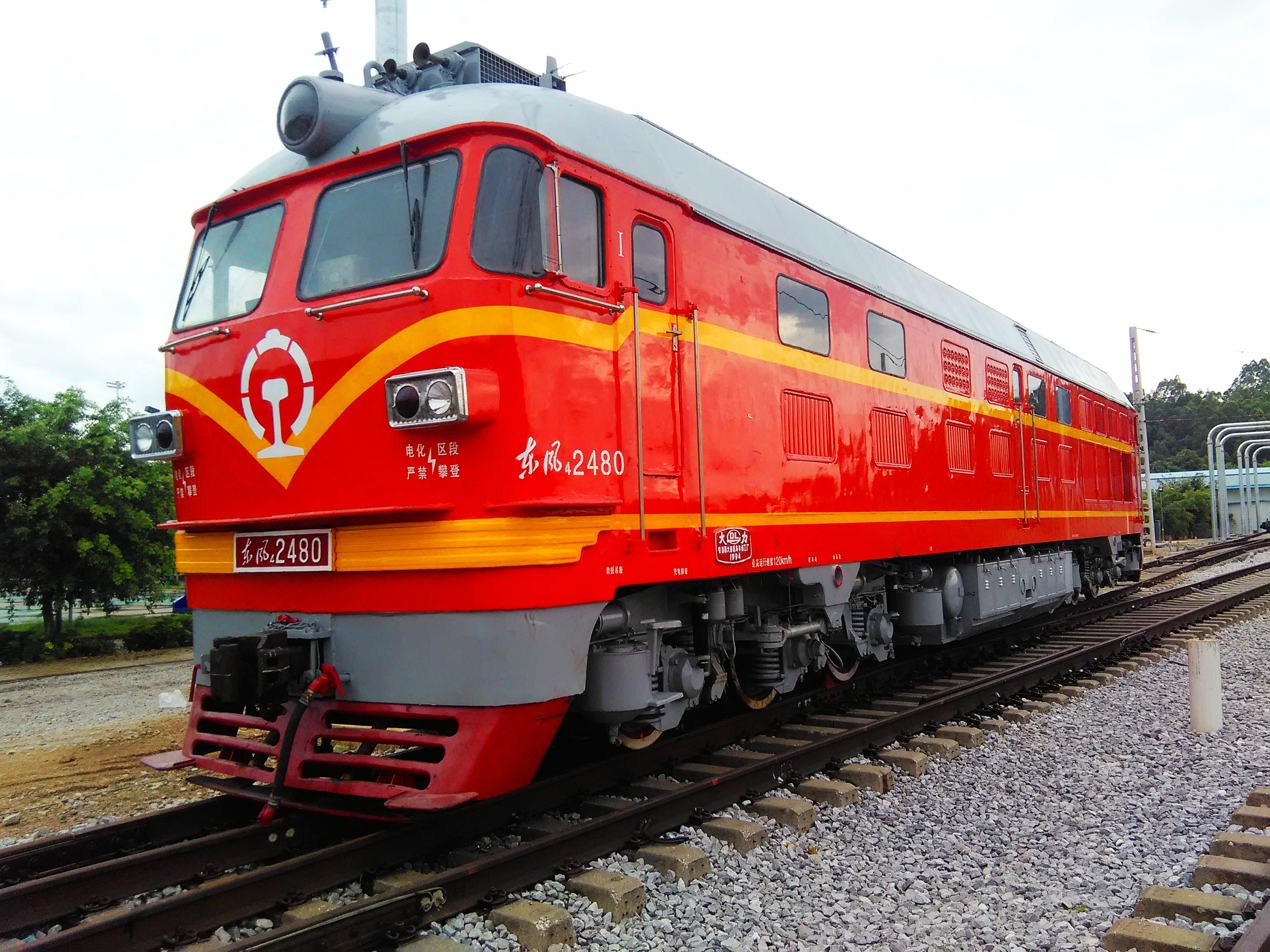
DF4B-2480

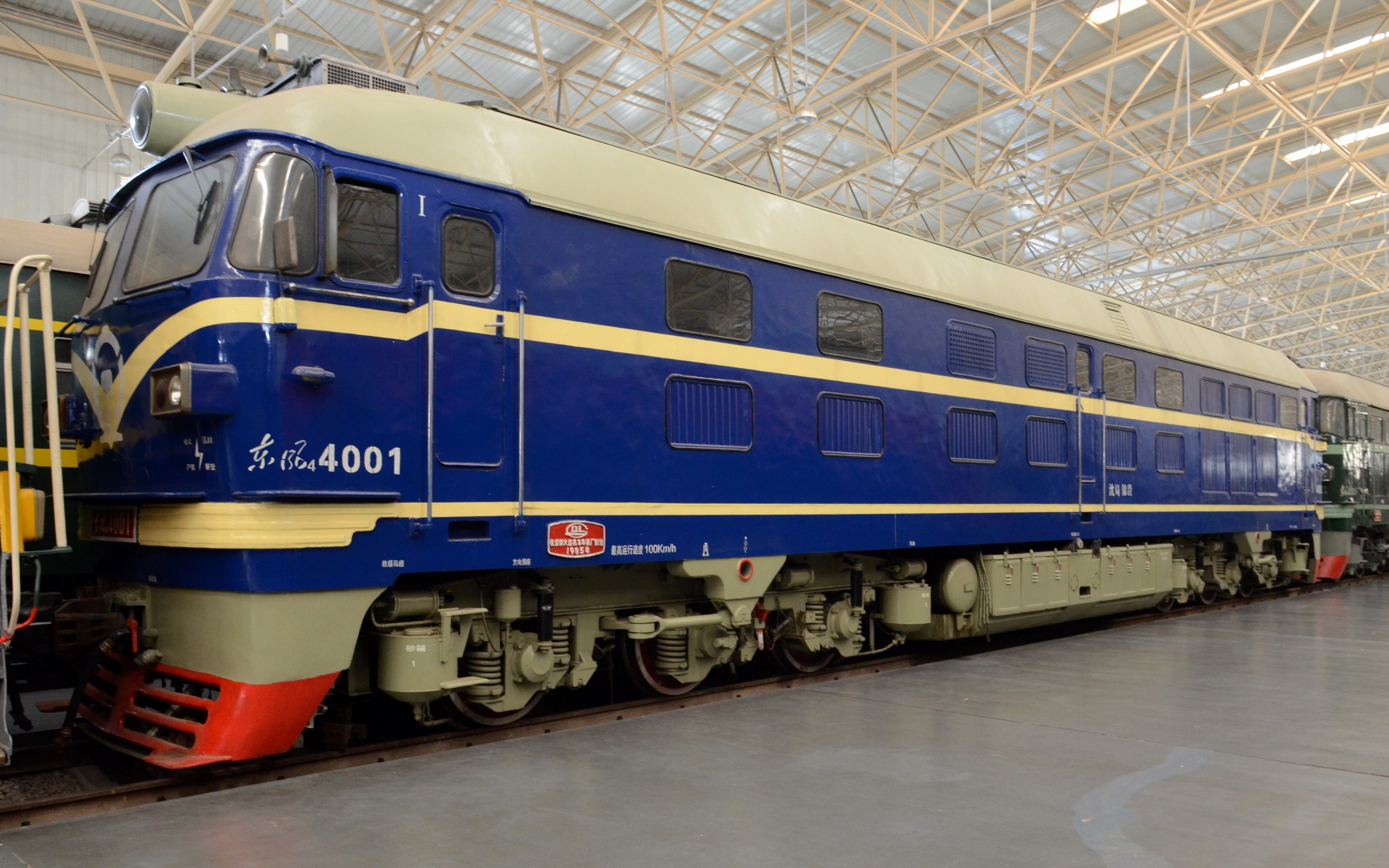
DF4C-4001

=== DF4/DF4A ===
- DF4-0001: is preserved at the China Railway Museum
- DF4-0002: is preserved at Fengtai Locomotive Depot, Beijing Railway Bureau
- DF4-0084: is preserved at Baoji Railway Technicion College
- DF4-0187: is preserved at Shandong Polytechnic
- DF4-0212: is preserved at Hebei Vocational College Of Rail Transportation
- DF4-2002: is preserved at Zhejiang Normal University
- DF4-2012: is preserved at Jinan Railway Advanced Technical School

=== DF4B ===
- DF4B-1029: is preserved at the Shengyang Railway Museum
- DF4B-1442: is preserved at Taiyuan Locomotive Depot, Taiyuan Railway Bureau
- DF4B-1718: is preserved at Anhui Communications Vocational & Technical College
- DF4B-1781: is preserved at Heilongjiang Communications Polytechnic
- DF4B-1787: is preserved at Liuzhou Industrial Museum
- DF4B-1884: is preserved at Heilongjiang Communications Polytechnic
- DF4B-1893: is preserved at Fengtai Locomotive Depot, Beijing Railway Bureau
- DF4B-1983: is preserved at Central South University
- DF4B-2127: is preserved at Qiqihar Technician College
- DF4B-2244: is preserved at Nanjing Railway Vacational Technical College
- DF4B-2298: is preserved at Qiqihar Railway Engineering School
- DF4B-2480: is preserved at Liuzhou Railway Vacational Technical College.
- DF4B-3179: is preserved at Huhhot Vocational College
- DF4B-6210: is preserved at North University of China
- DF4B-7019: is preserved at Southwest Jiaotong University
- DF4B-7149: is preserved at Shijiazhuang Tiedao University
- DF4B-7260: is preserved at Tianjin Railway Vacational Technical College
- DF4B-9008: is preserved at the China Railway Museum

=== DF4C ===
- DF4C-4001: is preserved at the China Railway Museum
- DF4C-4040: is preserved at the China Railway Museum
- DF4C-5331: is preserved at the Shenyang Railway Museum
