= SLJ900/32 =

Chinese bridge launching gantry

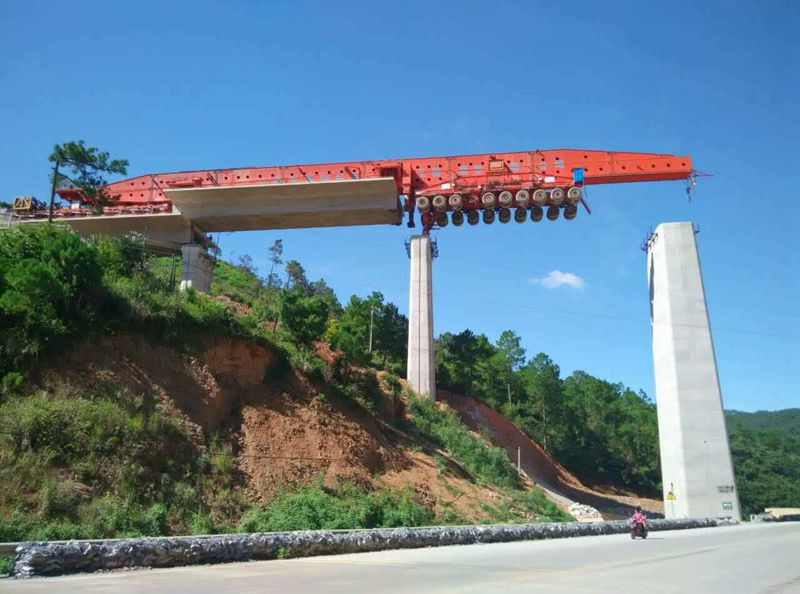
- Type: Launching gantry
- Manufacturer: Beijing Wowjoint Machinery Company
- Production: 2015
- Length: 91 metres (299 ft)
- Width: 7 metres (23 ft)
- Height: 9 m (29 ft 6 in)
- Weight: 580 tonnes (640 short tons)
- Propulsion: 64x wheel drive system
- Speed: 8 km/h (5 mph) unloaded; 5 km/h (3 mph) loaded

The SLJ900/32 or otherwise known as the Iron Monster is a superheavy launching gantry and one of the largest and most ubiquitous in the world. At over 90 meters in length, the SLJ900/32 is also one of the world's longest terrestrial vehicles. It is built by the Beijing Wowjoint Machinery Company and designed by the Shijiazhuang Railway Design Institute.

== Description ==
The SLJ900/32 as aforementioned, is 91 metres (299 ft) long, 7 metres (23 ft) wide, 9 m (29 ft 6 in) tall and weighs around 580 tonnes (640 short tons). Compared to conventional cranes which require clear land and are typically only able to lift a few meters of bridge material per-lift, the SLJ900/32 is capable of lifting an entire large segment of bridging material (some of which weigh around 800 to 950 tons) in a relatively compact manner without the hassle of interference such as trees or rocks.

Construction process is done via the vehicle picking up a new pre-cast section of concrete underneath its "belly" and carrying it all the way from the very edge of the bridge to the installation point, where it will be connected to a predetermined pillar. Then, using a pneumatic structure, the machine is moored to the first pillar to extend to the second one, anchoring to it, and places the beam. The process would repeat itself until the bridge's foundations are completed.

The vehicle moves on a large 64x wheel drive system, which in itself is divided into four sections of 16 wheels each (forming two trucks, one at each end). Each of the sections can rotate up to 90 degrees allowing the machine to drive sideways for efficiency when picking up beams. The vehicle can maintain a top speed of 8 km/h (5 mph) unloaded, and 5 km/h (3 mph) carrying a bridge segment.

The average operational life of a vehicle is 730 spans. Almost 40% of gantries assemble more than 1,000 spans in their lifetimes.

== See also ==
- Launching gantry
