= Zhengxu Zhao =

Chinese engineer and computer scientist (born 1960)

Zhengxu Zhao FRSA (Chinese: 赵正旭; born February 1960, in Qingdao) is a Chinese engineer and computer scientist.

He was educated with a BSc and MSc in Engineering at Shandong University, China, and PhD in Computing at University of Staffordshire, UK, and has held academic leadership posts in the UK and the People's Republic of China. He is a Fellow of the Royal Society of Arts since 2015.

After his PhD from the CNAA (UK) in 1992, and three years following his postdoctoral work at the University of Newcastle, he was appointed at the age of 35, Chair & full Professor of Applied Computing at the University of Derby in the UK. Over a 16-year period there, he was also Department Chair in Computing and Chair of Academic Board and thereafter conferred a Doctor of Science on the basis of his personal academic and research achievements in Information Technology and Applied Computing. He had also hold the Cheung Kong Professorship (Changjiang Scholars Program) in Instrumentation Science & Engineering between 2001 and 2007 at Southeast University.

Between October 2008 and September 2014, he was the founder and Dean of Faculty of Computing Science & Technology at Shijiazhuang Tiedao University, where he had built the faculty from a near nil base to its current state of six Schools (including Computer Science, Digital Media, Informatics and Controls, Software Engineering, Networks Systems & Technology, Online Teaching & Learning) with courses ranging from undergraduate to postgraduate at BSc, MSc and PhD levels. Since October 2014, he has been the assistant Vice-Chancellor in charge of Teaching & Research and Computing & Information Technology.

He is a senior member of British Computer Society and IEEE, a British Charted Engineer (CEng) and Chartered IT Professional, and a senior technical advisor to the United Nations Development Programme. Since 2008, he has been a Chief Scientist in Mission Control Systems at Beijing Aerospace Command and Control Center and had participated more than twelve Chinese national space projects and mission control tasks of the Chinese Lunar Exploration Program, and Shenzhou Manned Spaceship Mission Programs. He is therefore recognized as The Technical Founder of China's Space Mission Visualization and is honored and credited in the national media as "Chang'e Artist". He has over 270 research publications, conference presentations, five books and two patents to his credit and has supervised more than 60 PhD students and has examined nearly a hundred of PhD theses. He has been the recipient of numerous research grants, prizes and awards from academic bodies and organizations in the UK, USA, and China.
