= Shijiazhuang Tiedao University =

University in Hebei, China

Coordinates: 38.0828°N 114.5089°E

- 石家庄铁道大学
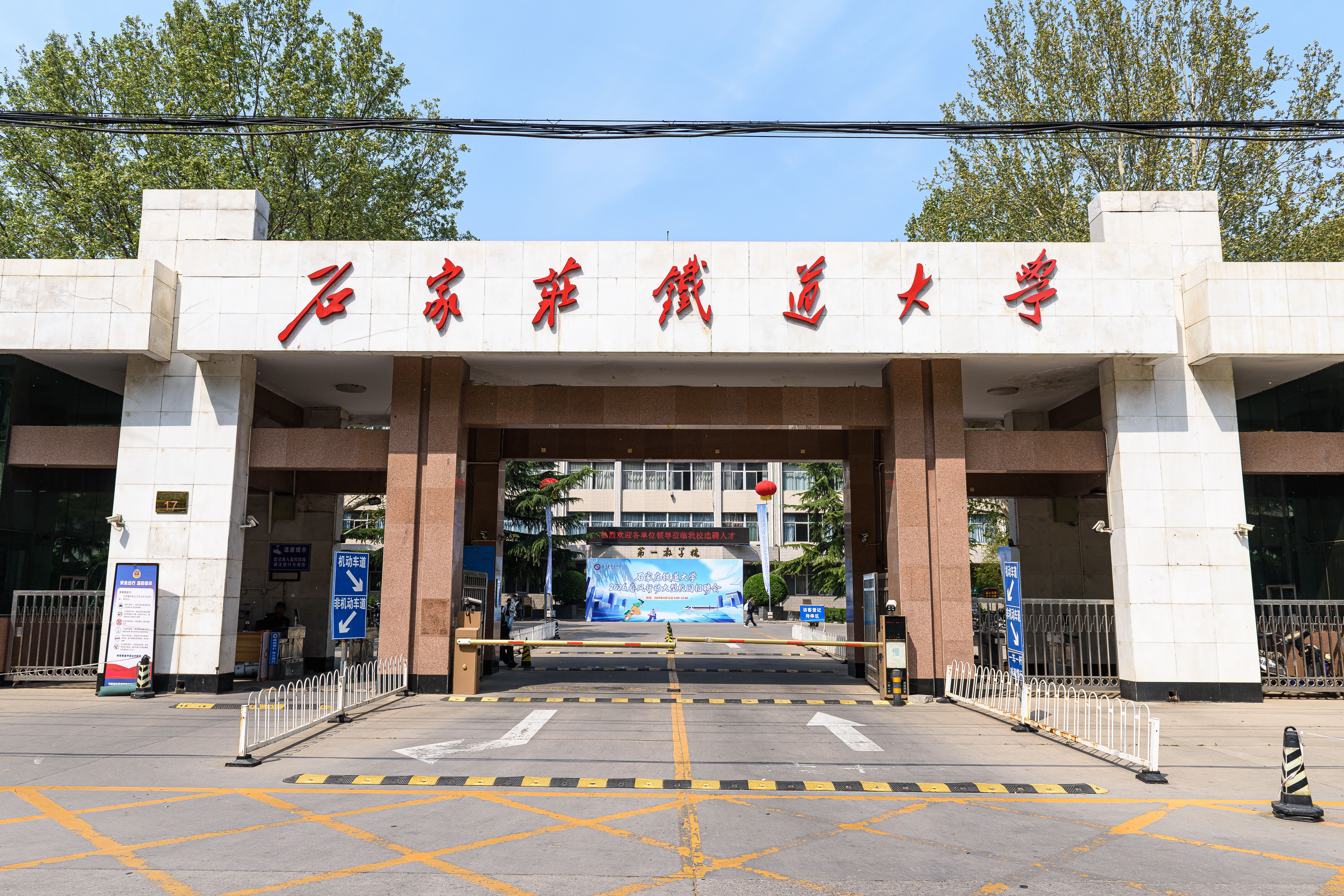
- Former names: Shijiazhuang Railway Institute
- Established: 1950
- Location: Shijiazhuang

Shijiazhuang Tiedao University (abbreviated STDU, also known as Tieda and Tieyuan; Chinese: 石家庄铁道大学) is a national key university in China, specialised in transportation science, engineering and technology and information technology, etc. STDU is currently under the joint administration of the People's Government of Hebei Province, the Ministry of Education of the People's Republic of China, State Administration of Science, Technology and Industry for National Defence of the People's Republic of China and National Railway Administration of the People's Republic of China. It has been selected, with Tsinghua University, Zhejiang University, Shanghai Jiaotong University, Beijing Jiaotong University, Beijing Institute of Technology and other key universities, for the "Educating and Training Program for Outstanding Engineers" (教育部"卓越工程师教育培养计划") of the Ministry of Education. In 2016, STDU was listed as the key supporting first-class universities and first-class-discipline construction university.

STDU was formerly known as the Railway Engineering Institute of the People's Liberation Army (Army), founded in 1950, and was then one of the key universities in the Army. In 1979, STDU was listed as a national key university. In 1984, it was transferred to and under the administration of the Ministry of Railways of the People's Republic of China and renamed as Shijiazhuang Railway Institute. In 2000, it was transferred to Hebei Province, implementing jointly construction by the central government and the local government. In March 2010, it was renamed as Shijiazhuang Tiedao University.

As of July 2018, STDU has nineteen schools and departments and twenty-five research institutes. There are fifty-one undergraduate majors. STDU currently has more than 1,400 staff, 23,800 full-time undergraduate students and 2,700 postgraduates at both masters and doctorals levels.

Its campus is situated in the suburb of Shijiazhuang city, the provincial capital of Hebei Province.

== Notable faculty and alumni ==
- Yanliang Du (杜彦良, 1956), Pro-Vice Chancellor of Shijiazhuang Tiedao University, Professor & Fellow of Chinese Academy of Engineering
- Changyu Shen (申长雨, 1963), Director of the State Intellectual Property Office of The People's Republic of China, Professor & Fellow of Chinese Academy of Science
- Hai-Sui Yu (余海岁, 1964-), Pro-Vice Chancellor of Nottingham University, DSc., Professor & Fellow of British Royal Academy of Engineering (FREng)
- Zhengxu Zhao (赵正旭, 1960-), Chief Scientist in space mission visualization & control, DSc., Professor & Fellow of British Royal Society of Arts (FRAS)
- Edward Zhang (张晓晨, 1983-), singer, actor and model in mainland China.
