= China Railways SS4 =

Chinese electric locomotive class

SS4 韶山4
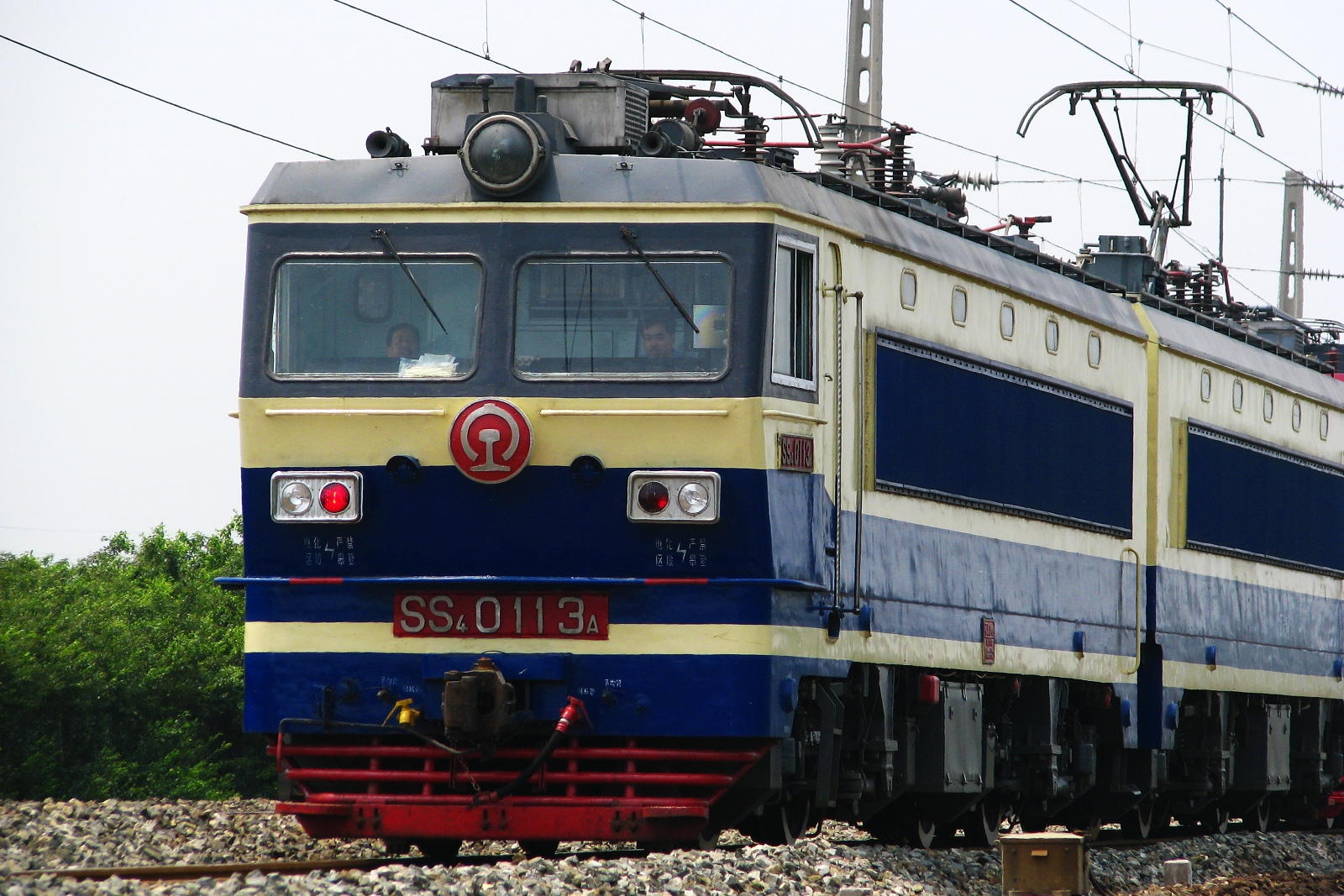
- SS4-0113
Type and origin
- Power type: Electric
- Builder: Datong Electric Locomotive Works; Zhuzhou Electric Locomotive Works; Ziyang Locomotive Works; Dalian locomotive works
- Model: SS_{4}
- Build date: 1985–2006
- Total produced: 1577
Specifications
- Configuration
  - UIC: Bo′Bo′+Bo′Bo′
- Gauge: 1,435 mm (4 ft 8 1/2 in)
- Wheelbase: 4,300 mm (14 ft 1 in)
- Length: 32,832 mm (107 ft 8.6 in) (between coupler centers)
- Width: 3,100 mm (10 ft 2 in)
- Height: 4,040 mm (13 ft 3 in)
- Axle load: 23 t (22.6 long tons; 25.4 short tons)
- Electric system/s: 25 kV AC Catenary
- Current pickup: Pantograph
- Transmission: AC – DC
Performance figures
- Maximum speed: 100 km/h (62 mph)
- Power output: 6,400 kW (8,600 hp)
- Tractive effort: 628 kN (141,000 lb_{f}) (starting); 436.5 kN (98,100 lb_{f}) (continuous)

The Shaoshan 4 (Chinese: 韶山4) is a type of electric locomotive used on China's national railway system. This locomotive was originally built by the Zhuzhou Electric Locomotive Works. The power system was 25kV single-phase AC, and the axle arrangement was Bo′Bo′+Bo′Bo′.

== History ==
In 1993, Zhuzhou Electric Locomotive Works produced the SS4G (Chinese: 韶4改). The SS4G is very similar to the standard SS4, apart from improved electrical systems.

The SS4 Electric Locomotive is an eight shaft fixing reconnection heavy freight electric locomotive based on two four-axle locomotives connected. One unit, SS4-0043, was damaged in a tunnel during the 2008 Sichuan earthquake.

== Manufacturers ==
SS4s were manufactured by several companies:

- Zhuzhou Electric Locomotive Works (0001～0158; 0159～1175; 1886)
- Datong Electric Locomotive Works (6001～6168)
- Ziyang Locomotive Works (3001～3002)
- Dalian locomotive works (7001～7110; 7121～7241)
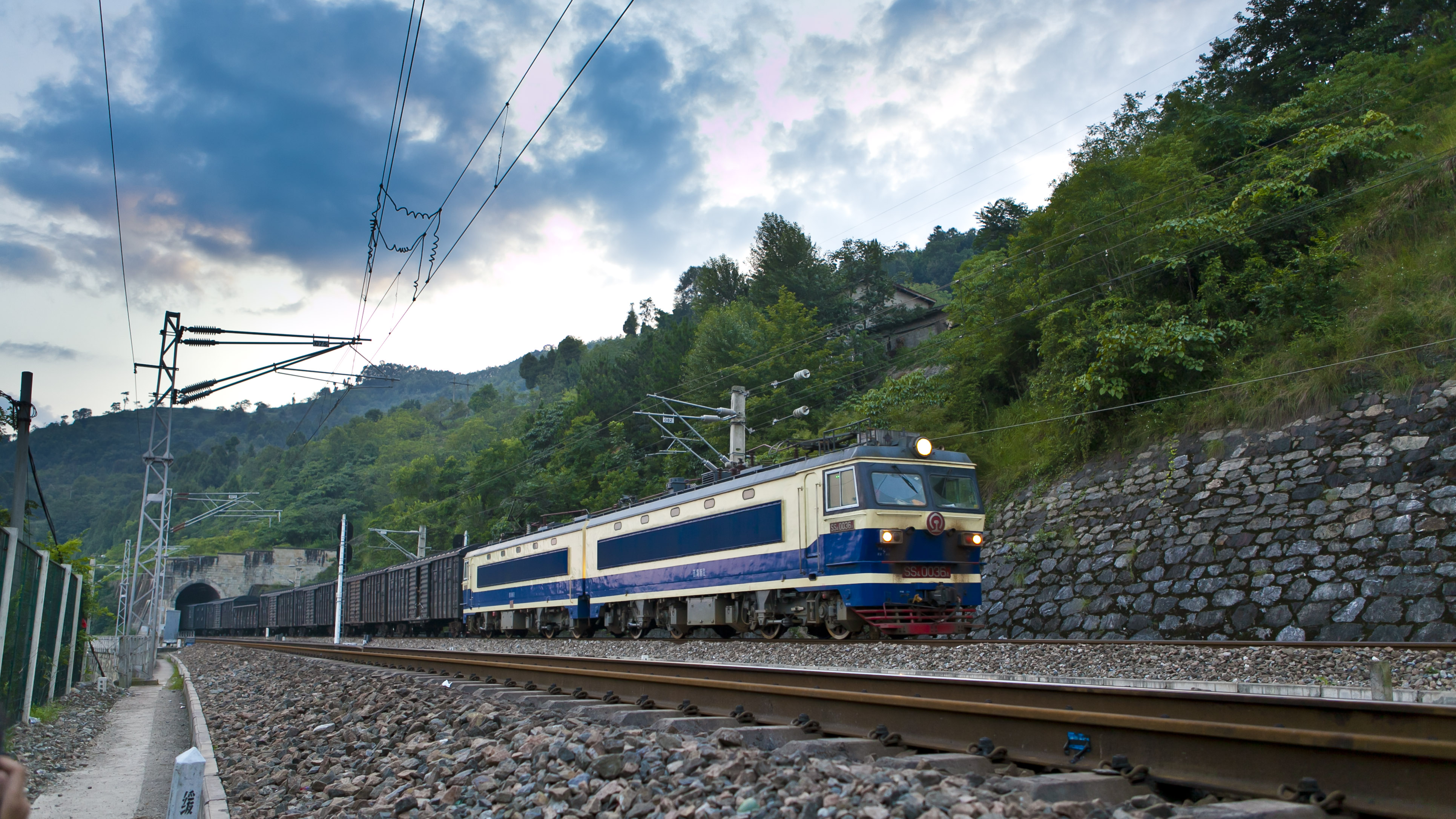
SS4-0036 at Yangpingguan

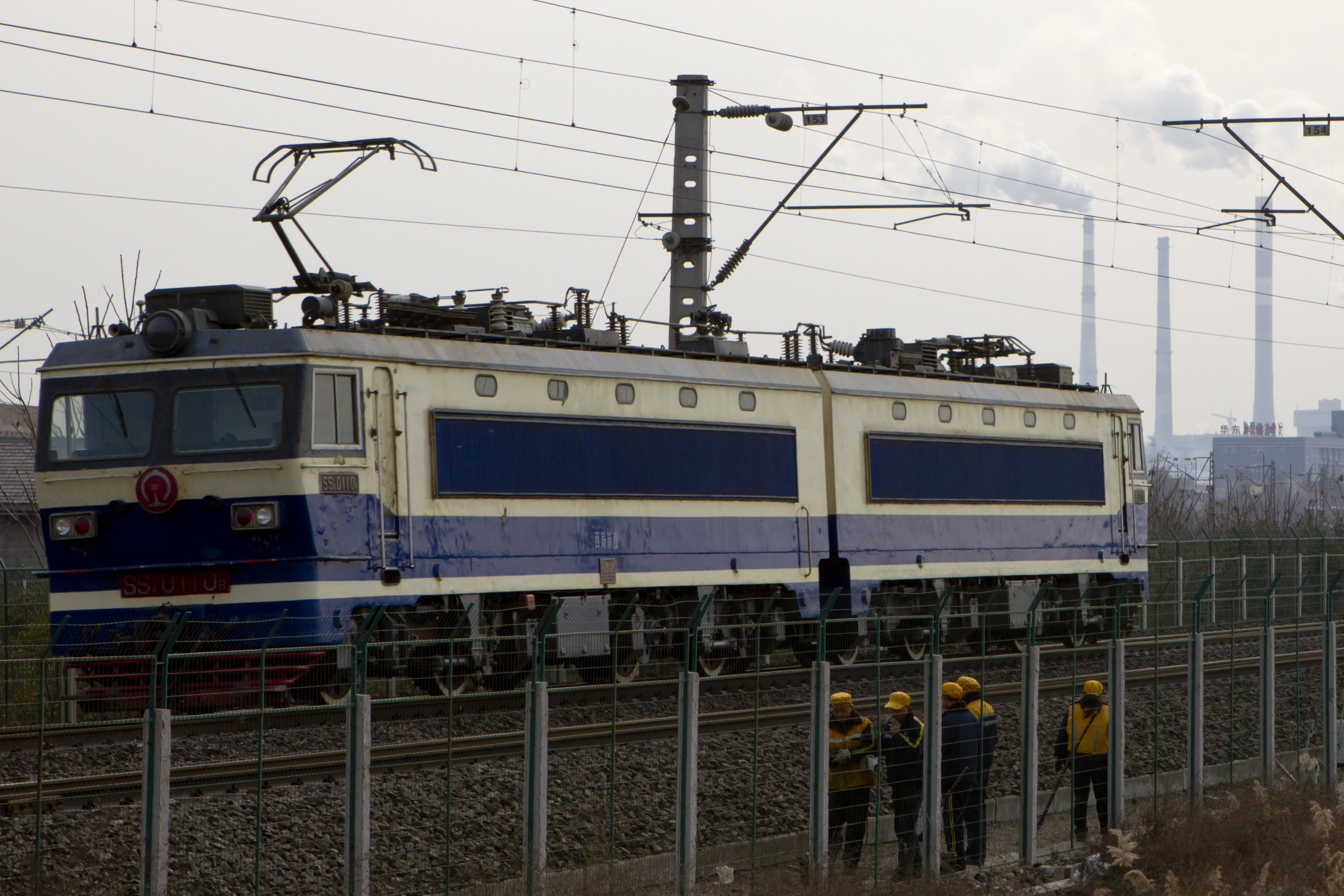
SS4-0110

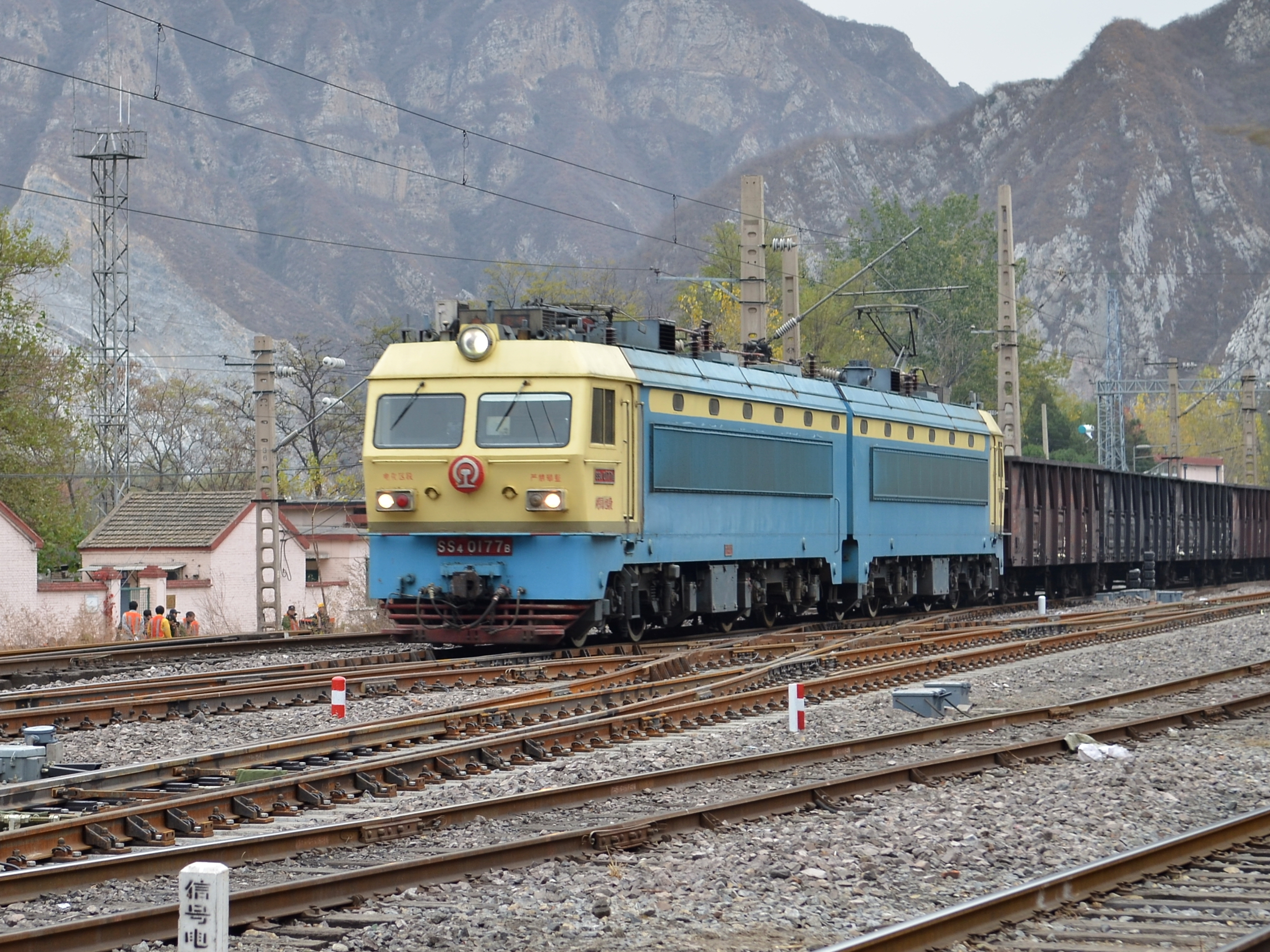
SS4-0177 at Luopoling Railway Station

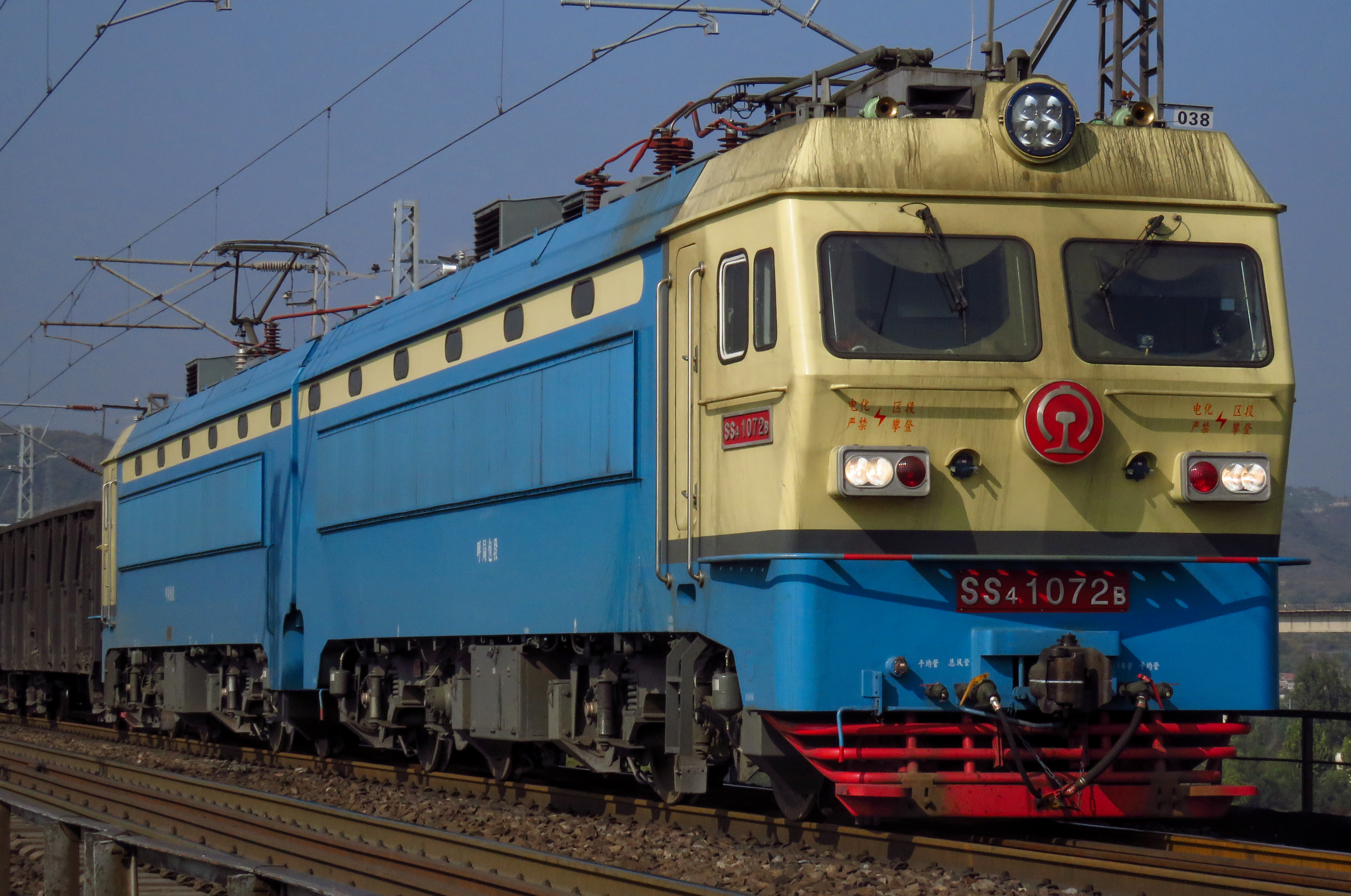
SS4-1072

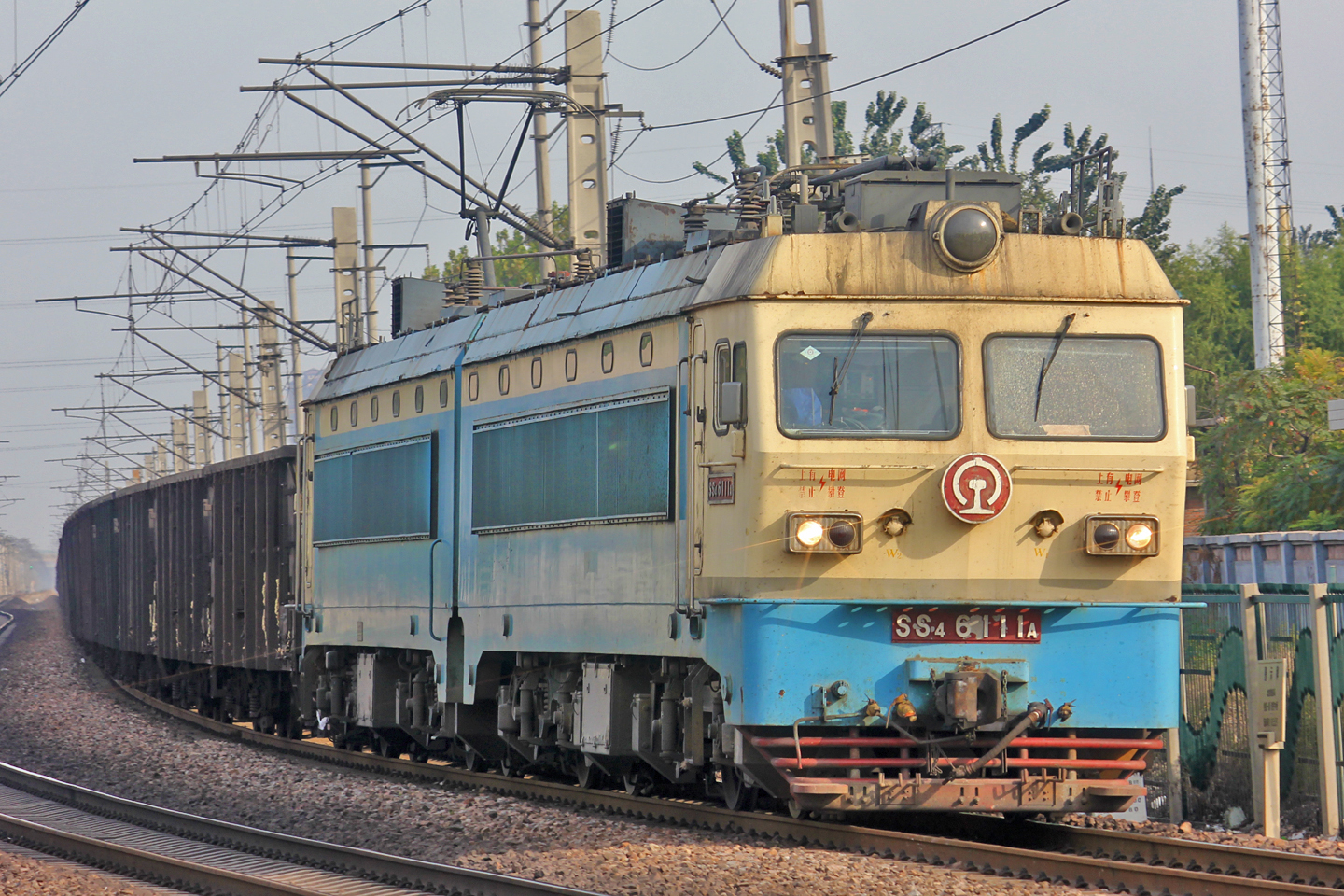
SS4-6111 at Shijiazhuang–Dezhou Railway

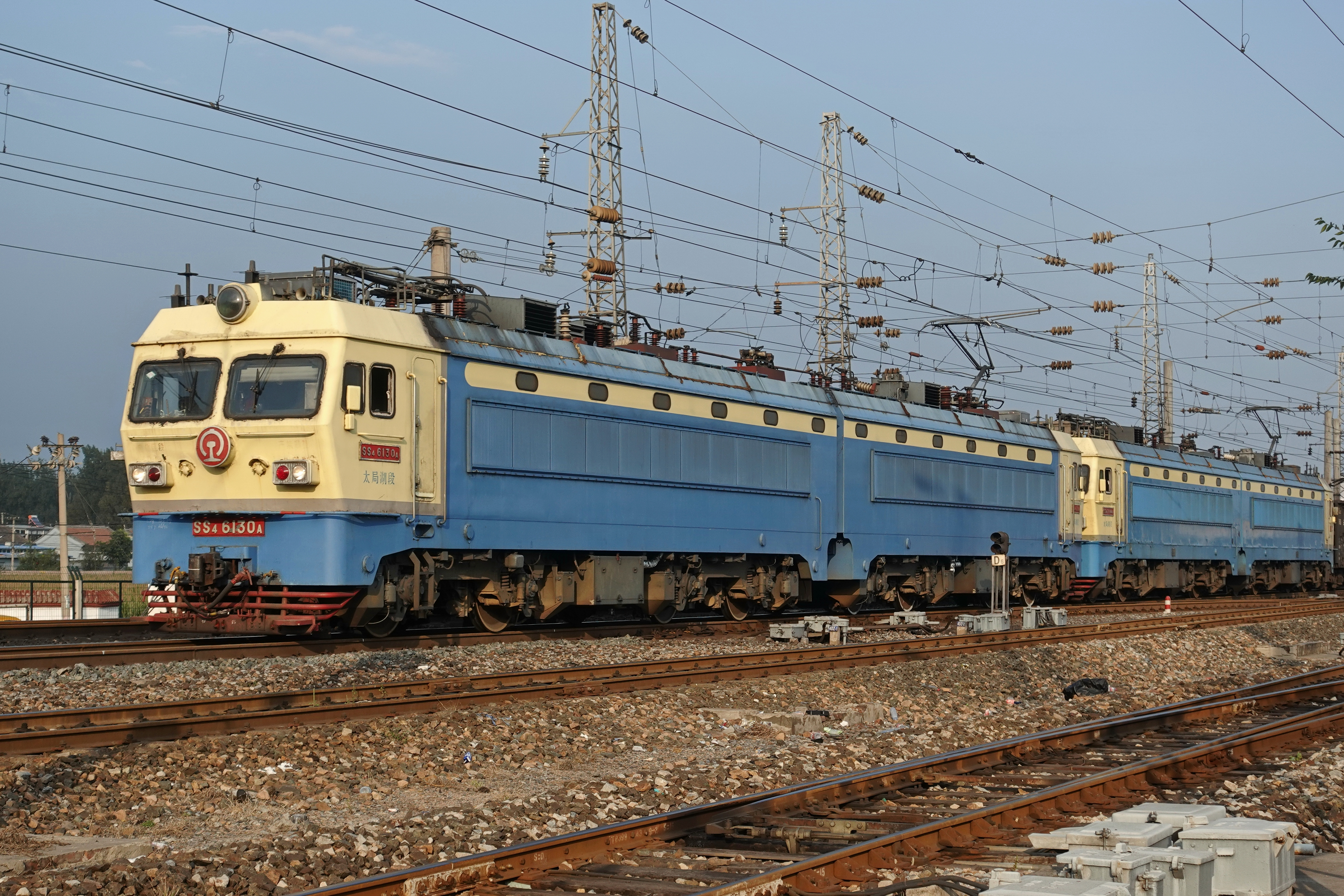
SS4-6130

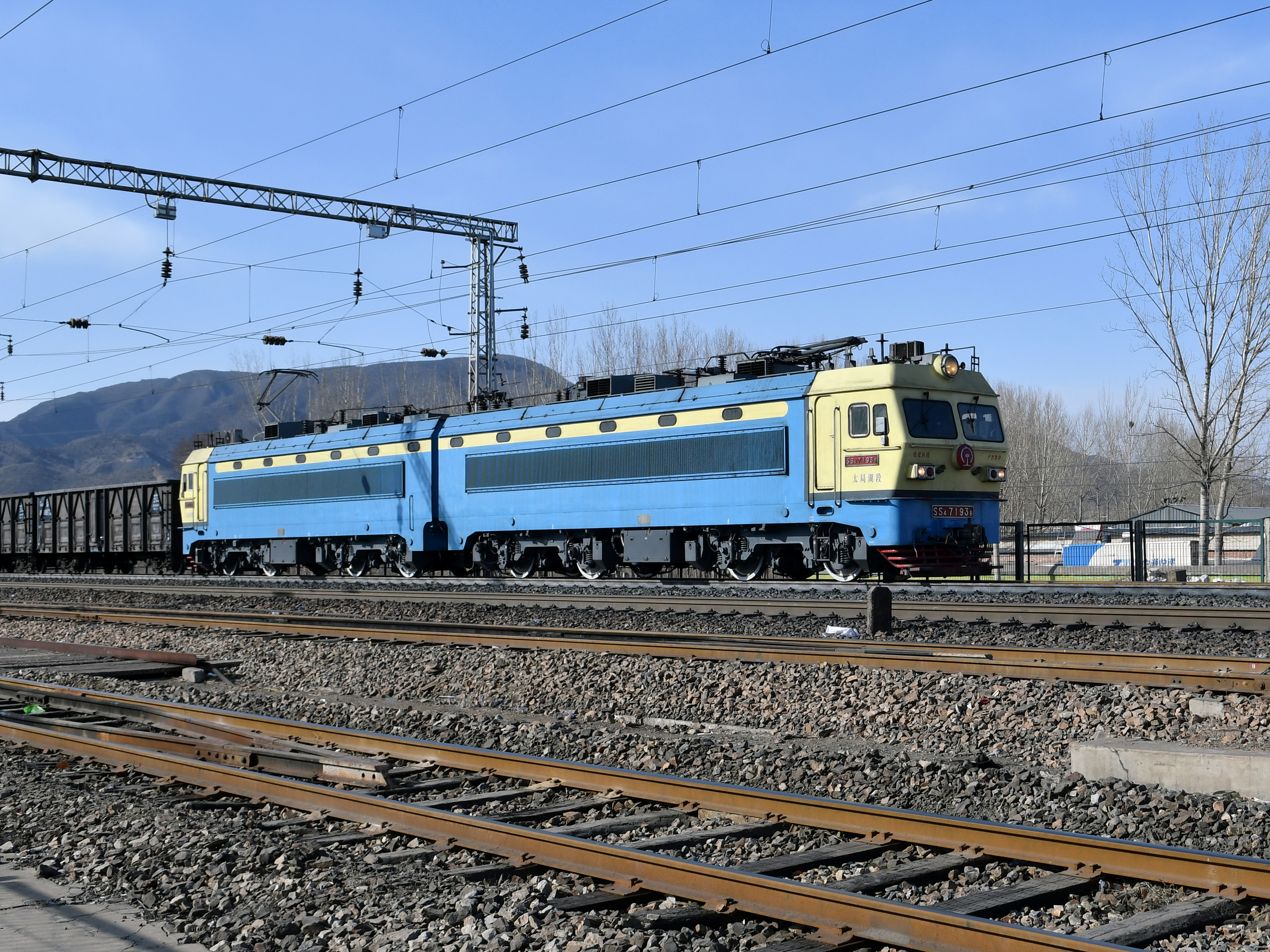
SS4-7193 at Datong-Qinhuangdao Railway

== See also ==
- China Railways SS1
- China Railways SS3
- China Railways SS3B
- China Railways 8K
- China Railways 8G

== Preservation ==
- SS4-0063: is preserved at Taiyuan Locomotive Depot, Taiyuan Railway Bureau
- SS4-0168: is preserved at the China Railway Museum
- SS4-6001: is preserved at the China Railway Museum
