= China Railways SS3B =

Chinese electric locomotive class

SS3B 韶山3B 大3B
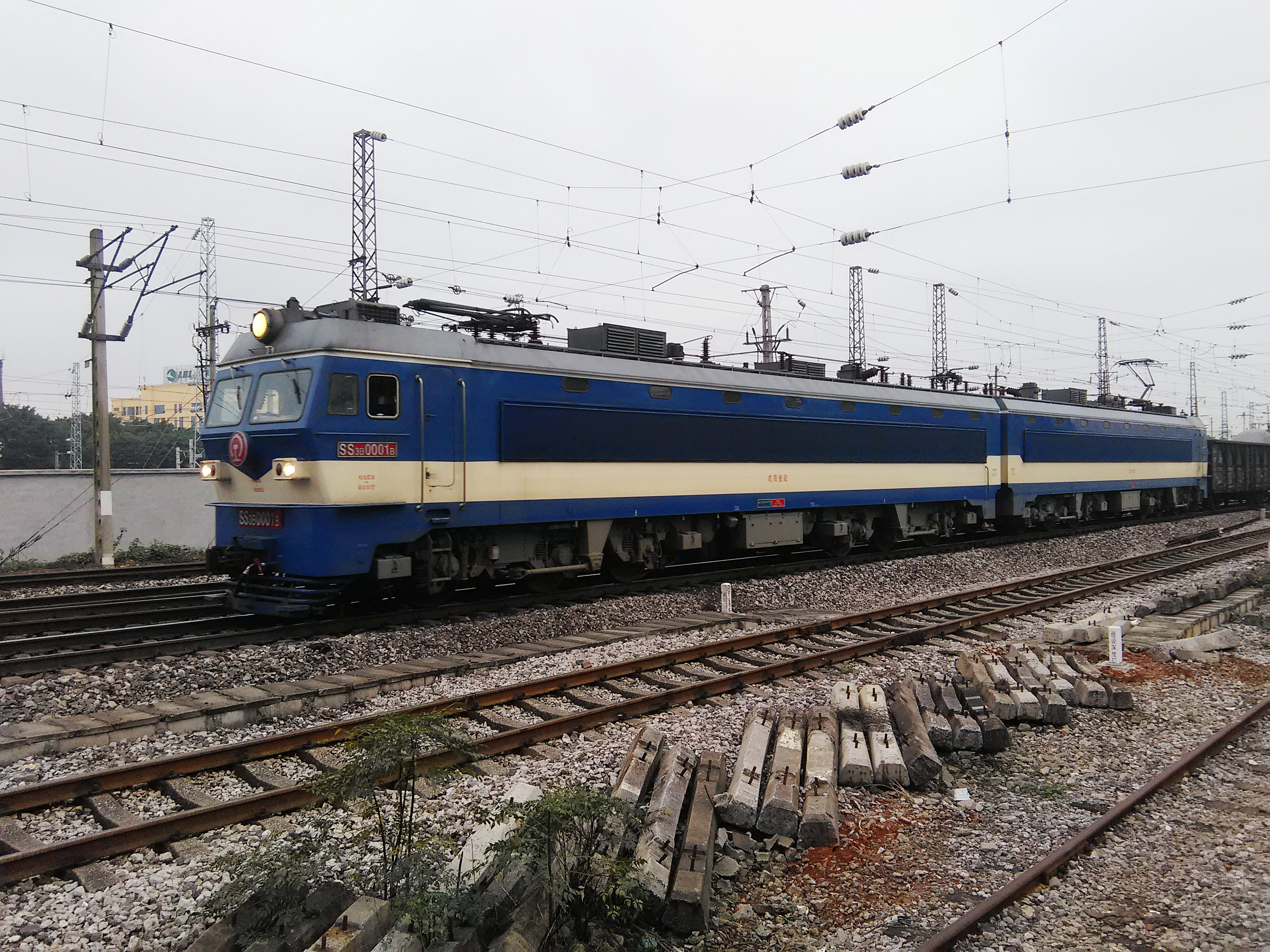
- SS3B-0001, Liuzhou, 2016.
Type and origin
- Power type: Electric
- Builder: Datong Electric Locomotive Works; Zhuzhou Electric Locomotive Works; Ziyang Locomotive Works; Dalian locomotive works
- Model: SS_{3B}
- Build date: 2002–2009
- Total produced: 353
Specifications
- Configuration
  - UIC: Co'Co'+Co'Co'
- Gauge: 1,435 mm (4 ft 8 1/2 in)
- Wheelbase: 4,300 mm (14 ft 1 in)
- Length: 42,832 mm (140 ft 6.3 in) (between coupler centers)
- Width: 3,100 mm (10 ft 2 in)
- Height: 4,750 mm (15 ft 7 in) ± 50 mm (2.0 in)
- Axle load: 23 t (22.6 long tons; 25.4 short tons)
- Electric system/s: 25 kV AC Catenary
- Current pickup: Pantograph
- Transmission: AC – DC
Performance figures
- Maximum speed: 100 km/h (62 mph)
- Power output: 8,640 kW (11,590 hp)
- Tractive effort: 941.8 kN (211,700 lb_{f}) (starting); 635.6 kN (142,900 lb_{f}) (continuous)

The Shaoshan 3B (Chinese: 韶山3B/大3B) is a type of electric locomotive used on the People's Republic of China's national railway system. This locomotive was built by the Ziyang Electric Locomotive Works. The power supply was industrial-frequency single-phase AC, and the axle arrangement Co-Co+Co-Co.

SS3B Electric Locomotive is a twelve shaft fixing reconnection heavy freight electric locomotive which based on two six-axle locomotives connected.

== Named locomotives ==
- SS3B-5001: "Pioneer in power of God" (Chinese: 先锋力神)

== Gallery ==
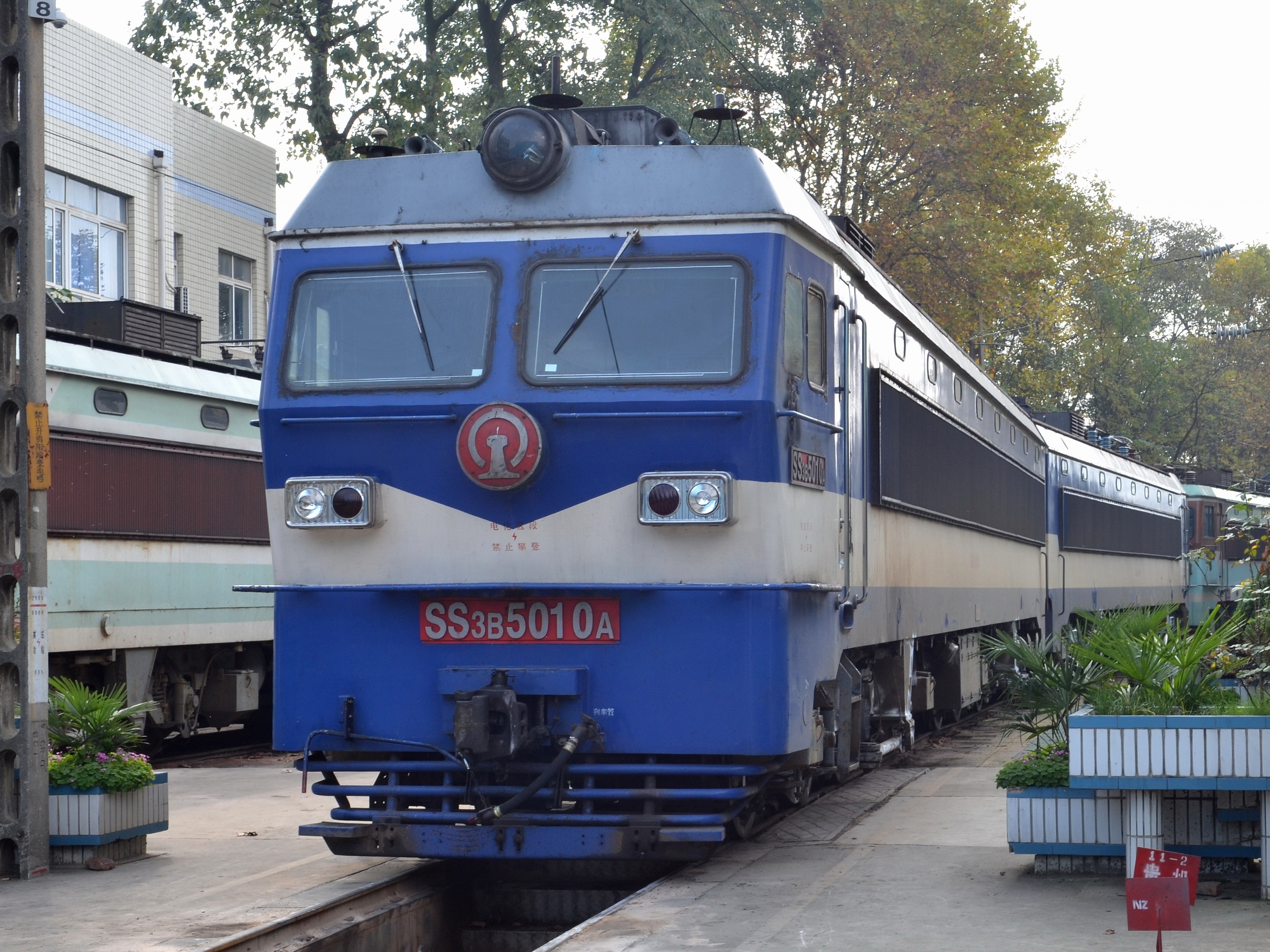
SS3B-5010 in Guiyang Locomotive Depot.

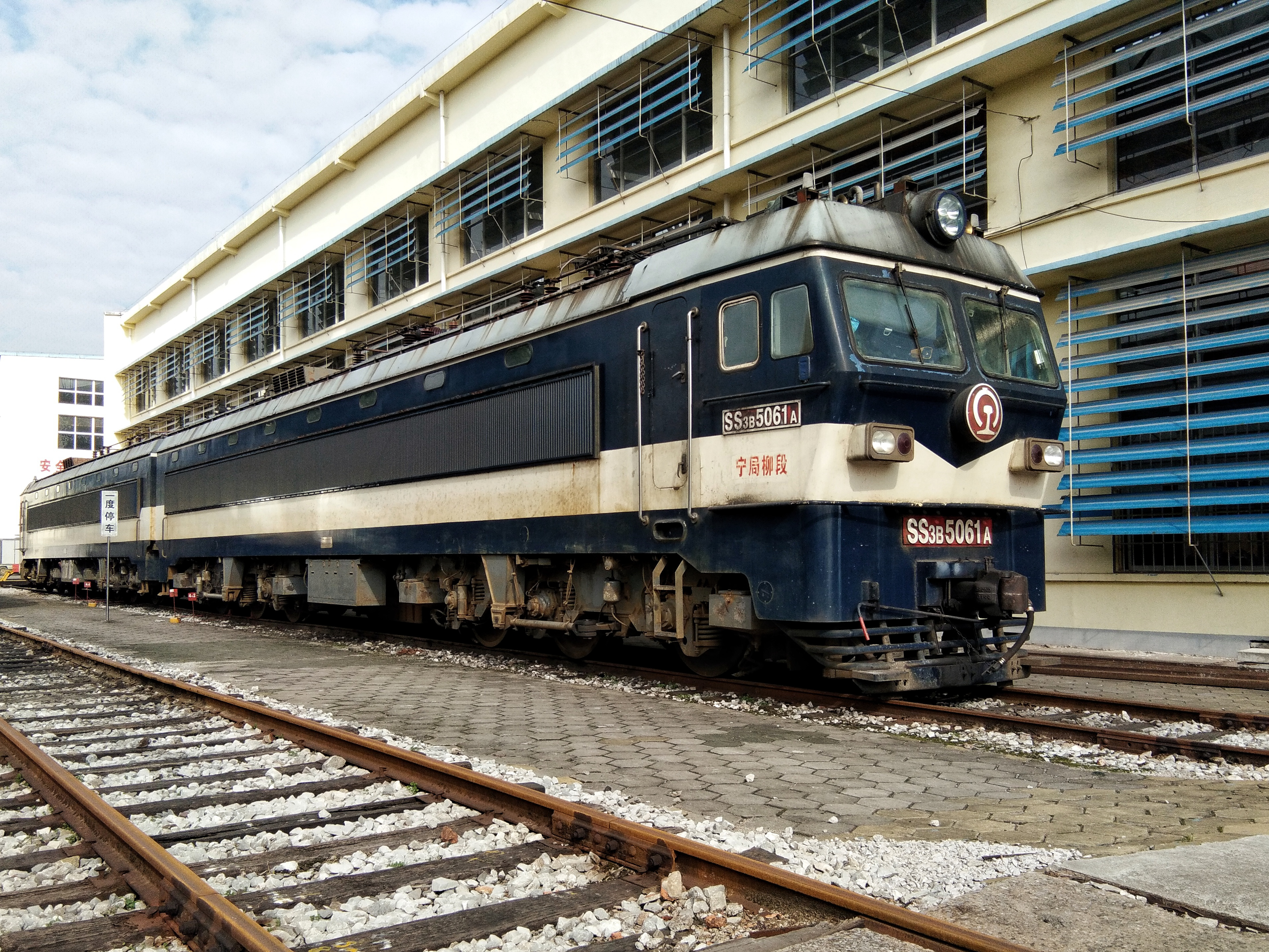
SS3B-5061 in Liuzhou Locomotive Depot.

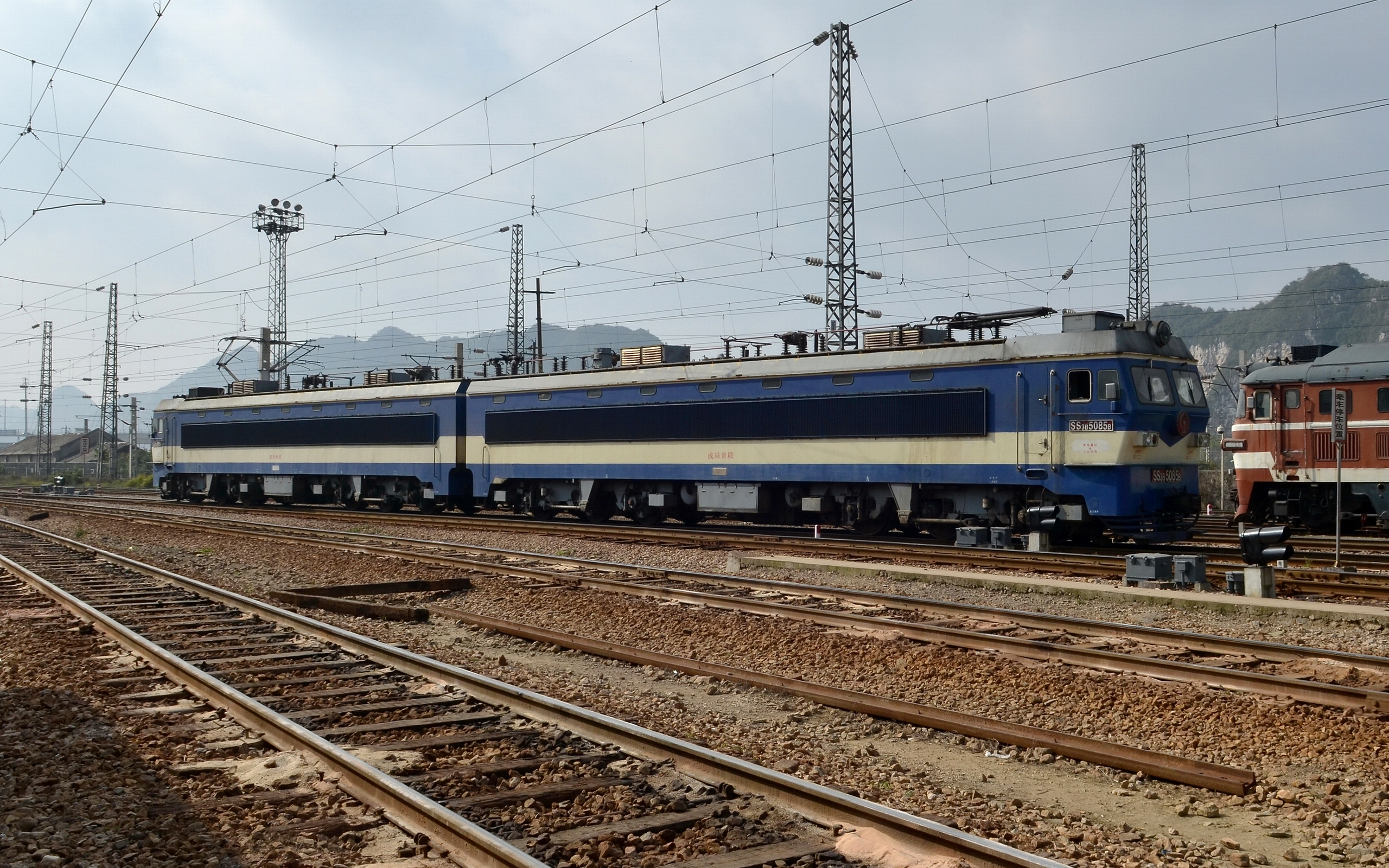
SS3B-5085 in Guiyang Locomotive Depot.

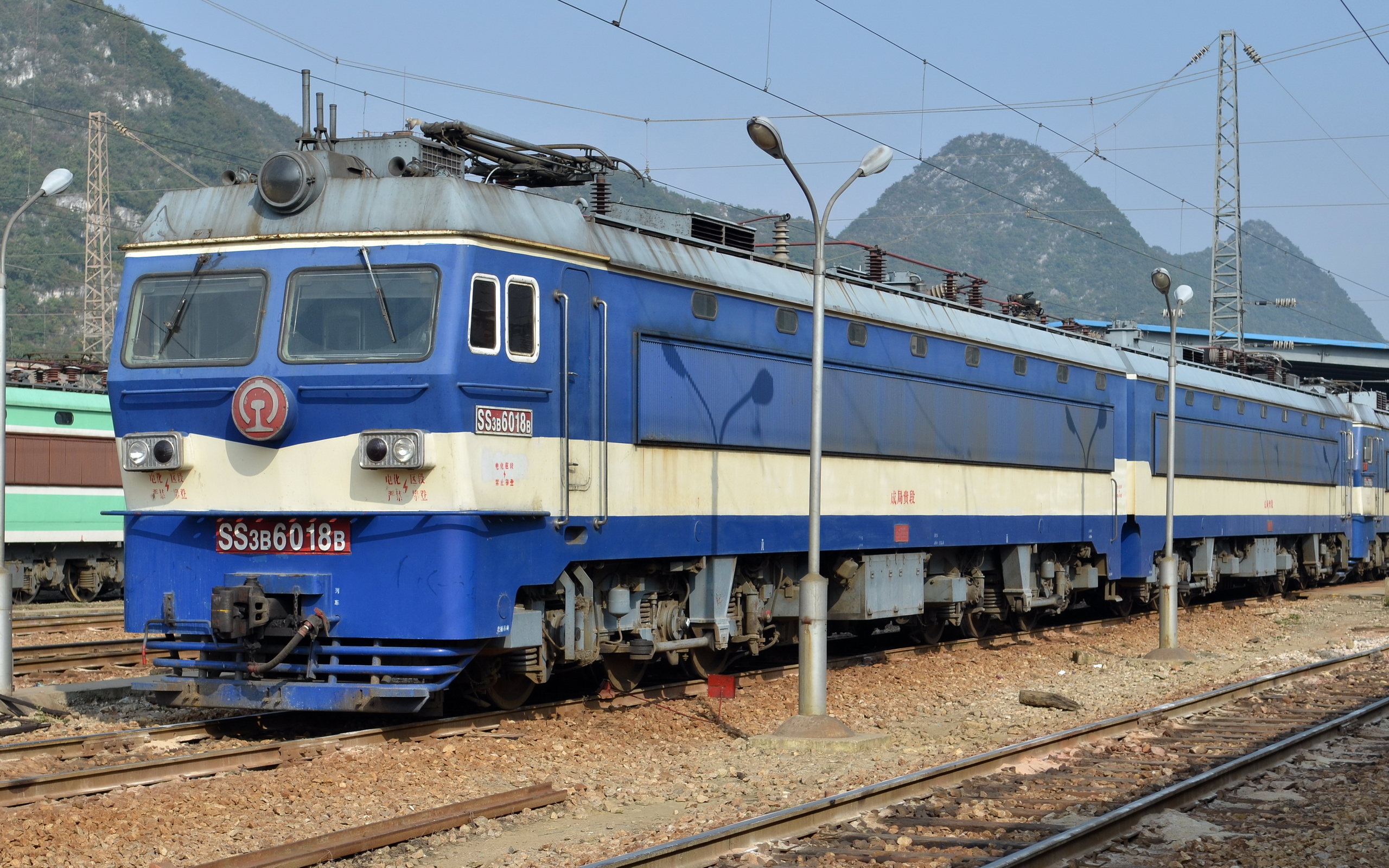
SS3B-6018 in Guiyang Locomotive Depot.

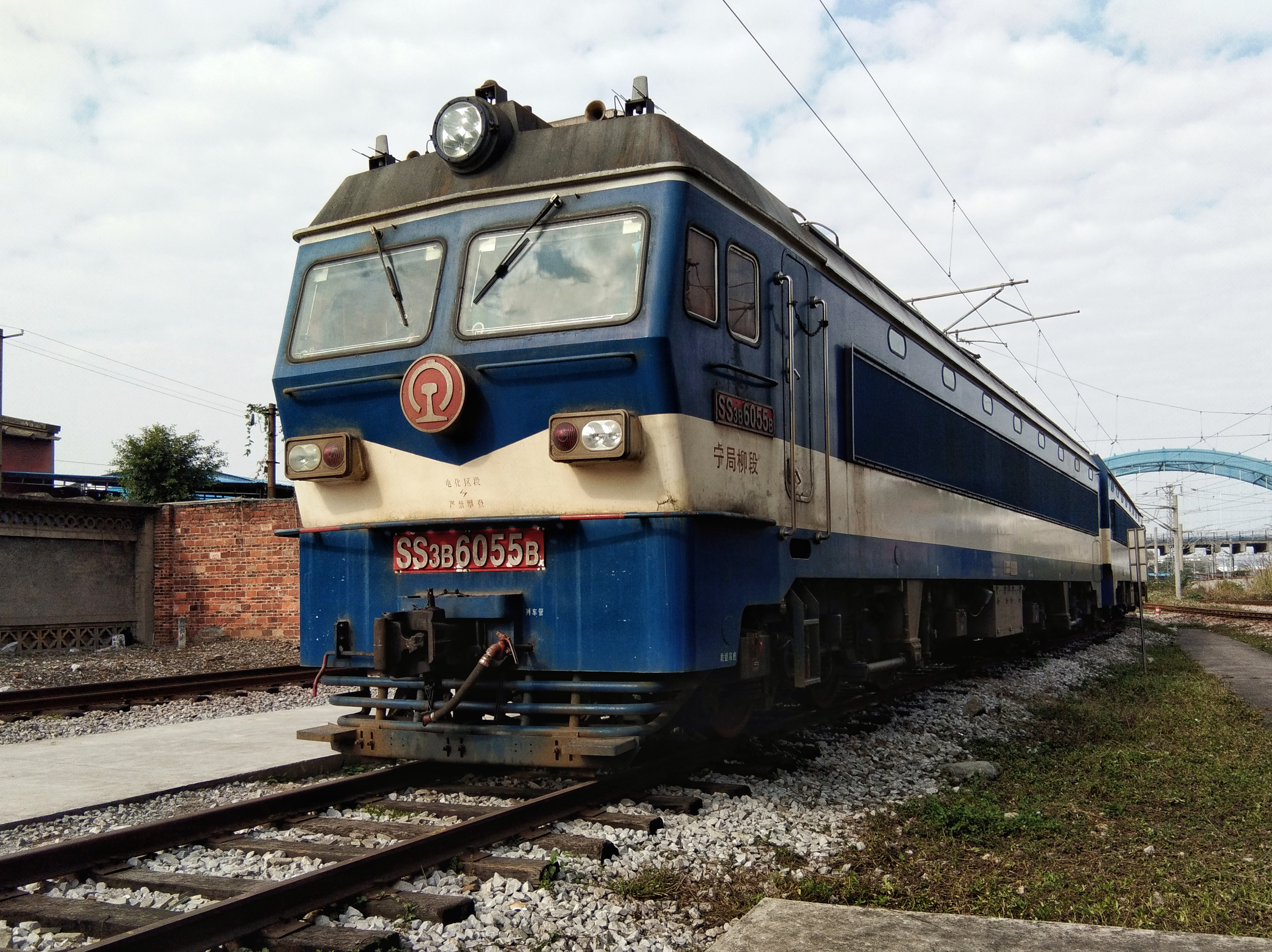
SS3B-6055 in Liuzhou Locomotive Depot.

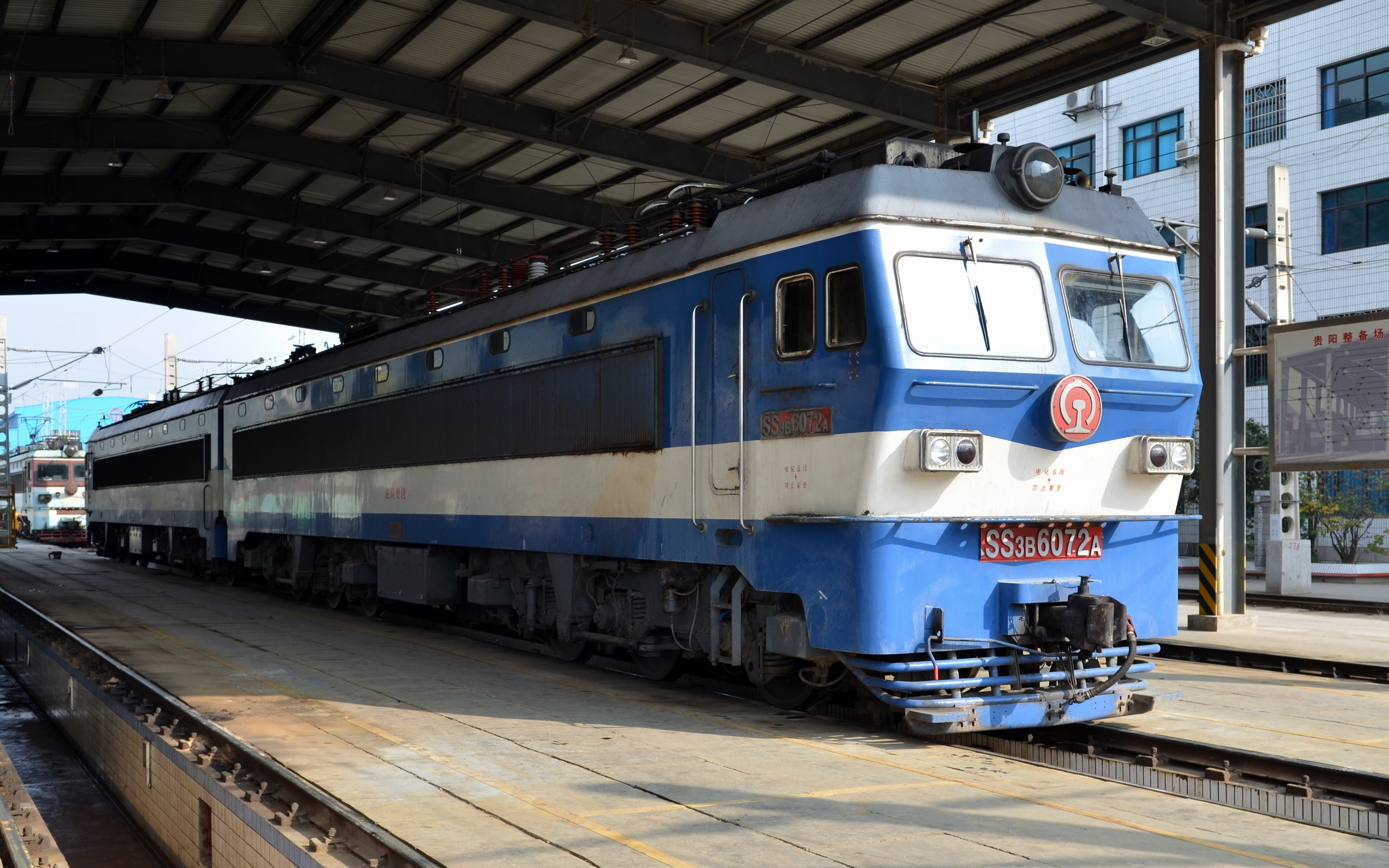
SS3B-6072 in Guiyang Locomotive Depot.

== Main users ==
SS3Bs have been used by several users:

- China Railway
  - Chengdu Railway Bureau
  - Nanning Railway Bureau
  - Guangzhou Railway Group Co., Ltd.
  - Kunming Railway Bureau
  - Xi'an Railway Bureau
- Xiaoyi-Liulin Railway
- Dongsheng-Wuhai Railway

== Manufacturers ==
SS3Bs have been manufactured by several companies:

- Zhuzhou Electric Locomotive Works (0001～0119)
- Datong Electric Locomotive Works (6001～6129)
- Ziyang Locomotive Works (5001～5104)
- Dalian locomotive works (7001)

== See also ==
- China Railways SS1
- China Railways SS3
- China Railways SS4
