= SS3 =

SS3, SS III, or similar, may refer to:

== Vehicles and transportation ==
- SS-3 Shyster, a Soviet theatre ballistic missile
- SCA SS.3, an Italian fighter aircraft prototype
- SpaceShip III (SSIII), a proposed spaceplane
- China Railways SS3, an electric locomotive model used in China
- SM U-12 (Austria-Hungary), a submarine of the Austro-Hungarian Navy, originally named SS-3
- USS Adder (SS-3), a submarine of the United States Navy
- SS 3 Flaminia, an Italian state highway linking Rome with Fano, on the Adriatic Sea.

== Entertainment, media, fiction ==
- "SS-3", a song by American thrash metal band Slayer, from their album Divine Intervention
- Slime Season 3, a 2016 mixtape by American rapper Young Thug
- Serious Sam 3: BFE, a 2011 video game by Croteam
- "SS3", a simple and quick way to refer to the ninth season of Fall Guys.

== Other uses ==
- Pindad SS3, an Indonesian assault rifle
- SS3, a C1 control character
- 3rd SS, see List of Waffen-SS units

== See also ==
- SS (disambiguation)
