= SS (disambiguation) =

SS is most commonly an abbreviation for German Schutzstaffel ('Protection Squadron'), a paramilitary organisation in Nazi Germany.

SS, Ss, or similar may also refer to:

== Arts, entertainment, and media ==
- SS (band), an early Japanese hardcore punk band
- SS (manga), a Japanese comic 2000-2003
- SS Entertainment, a Korean entertainment company
- S.S., for Sosthenes Smith, H. G. Wells' pseudonym for the story A Vision of the Past
- The Wheel in Space, a 1968 Doctor Who serial (production code SS)

== Businesses and organizations ==
=== Businesses ===
- SS Cars Ltd, renamed Jaguar from 1945
- SS Entertainment, a Korean entertainment company
- S.S. Kresge Corporation, now known as Kmart, the first Big Box Store
- Sareen Sports Industries, India

=== Other organizations ===
- Sea Scouts
- United States Secret Service (founded in 1865)
- Shiv Sena (1966–2022), a political party in India
- Society of the Priests of Saint Sulpice, identified by the post-nominal letters SS
- Waffen-SS, a combat unit (1933–1945) related to the Schutzstaffel

== Language ==
- Ss (digraph) used in Pinyin
- ß or ss, a German-language ligature
- ss switch-reference in linguistics
- Scilicet, used as a section sign
- sensu stricto (in the strict sense) in Latin
- Swazi language (ISO 639-1 code "ss")

== Places ==
- American Samoa, former two-letter NATO code SS
- Guangdong Experimental High School (Sheng Shi or Saang Sat), China
- Province of Sassari, Italy (vehicle plate code SS)
- South Sudan (ISO 3166-1 code SS)
- SS postcode area, UK, around Southend-on-Sea
- San Sebastián, a Spanish city

== Science and technology ==
=== Biology and medicine ===
- (+)-sabinene synthase, an enzyme
- Serotonin syndrome, due to some serotonergic medications
- Sjögren's syndrome, an autoimmune disease
- Sweet's syndrome or acute febrile neutrophilic dermatosis

=== Computing ===
- .ss, top-level domain country code for South Sudan
- Screenshot, digital image showing contents of a computer display
- Slave select line on a computer data bus
- SS register in x86 processor
- Super speed USB, or USB 3.0
- ss, in the Unix iproute2 collection
- Sega Saturn, the abbreviation predominantly used in Japan

=== Other uses in science and technology ===
- Stainless steel, sometimes marked SS
- Subtropical storm, a category of subtropical cyclone
- Suspended solids and settleable solids, in water

== Sports ==
- Sareen Sports Industries, India
- Shortstop, a fielding position in baseball and softball
- Special stage (rallying)
- Strong safety, a position in American and Canadian football
- Sunday Silence, an American racehorse

== Transportation ==
=== Ship types ===
- Screw steamer, a ship prefix for steamboats and steamships
- Submarine, by US Navy hull classification

=== Other vehicles ===
- Chevrolet SS, a sports sedan
- Chevrolet SS (concept car)
- SS Cars Ltd, Jaguar from 1945
- SS class blimp, for anti-submarine warfare
- Super Sport (Chevrolet), performance option
- Eagle SS, a kit car

=== Transport operators and services ===
- SS (New York City Subway service), a former designation for the shuttles of the New York City Subway
- Corsair International (IATA airline code SS)
- Maatschappij tot Exploitatie van Staatsspoorwegen, a Dutch railroad
- Sand Springs Railway in Oklahoma, US, reporting mark
- Staatsspoorwegen, a Dutch East Indies railroad
- Stockholms Spårvägar (1915), a historic Swedish tram operator
- Stockholms Spårvägar, a Swedish tram operator

== Other uses ==
- Safety stock, a hedge against stockouts
- Saints, sometimes abbreviated ss
- Sanctioned Suicide, an internet forum for suicide discussion and encouragement
- Social security
- Collar of Esses, a form of livery collar formerly known as a "Collar of SS"

== See also ==
- "Double S", a 1978 song by Bill Anderson and Buddy Killen
- S/S (disambiguation)
- SS1 (disambiguation)
- SSS (disambiguation)
