= SS1 =

SS1 may refer to:

== Transportation ==
- SS 1, a British car of the 1930s and predecessor to the Jaguar
- China Railways SS1, an electric locomotive model used in China
- Moore SS-1, a glider
- Reliant Scimitar SS1, a sports car made by Reliant during the 1980s
- Strada statale 1 Via Aurelia, a major road in Italy

== Military and space ==
- USS Holland (SS-1), the first submarine of the U.S. Navy
- SpaceShipOne, a spaceplane that completed the first privately funded crewed space flight
- Pindad SS1, an Indonesian assault rifle
- SS-1 Scud, the NATO reporting name for a series of Soviet missiles

== Other uses ==
- SS1 (classification), a Les Autres sport classification
- Sky Sports 1, a British satellite sports channel
- Space Ship One (album), an album by Paul Gilbert
- "SS1", a simple and quick way to refer to the seventh season of Fall Guys.
