= S/S =

S/S may refer to:

- A Ship prefix that identifies a vessel as steam powered Vessel
  - A common naming prefix for any Merchant vessel
- S/S, an industry abbreviation in the fashion industry for Spring/Summer (as opposed to A/W (Autumn/Winter))
- S/S, a medical abbreviation for Signs and symptoms
- In clothing, refers to short-sleeved (as opposed to L/S (long-sleeved))
- Solidification / Stabilization (S/S) with Cement, a method of management and reuse of contaminated waste.

== See also ==
- SS (disambiguation)
