= Sareen Sports Industries =

Indian sports-equipment manufacturer

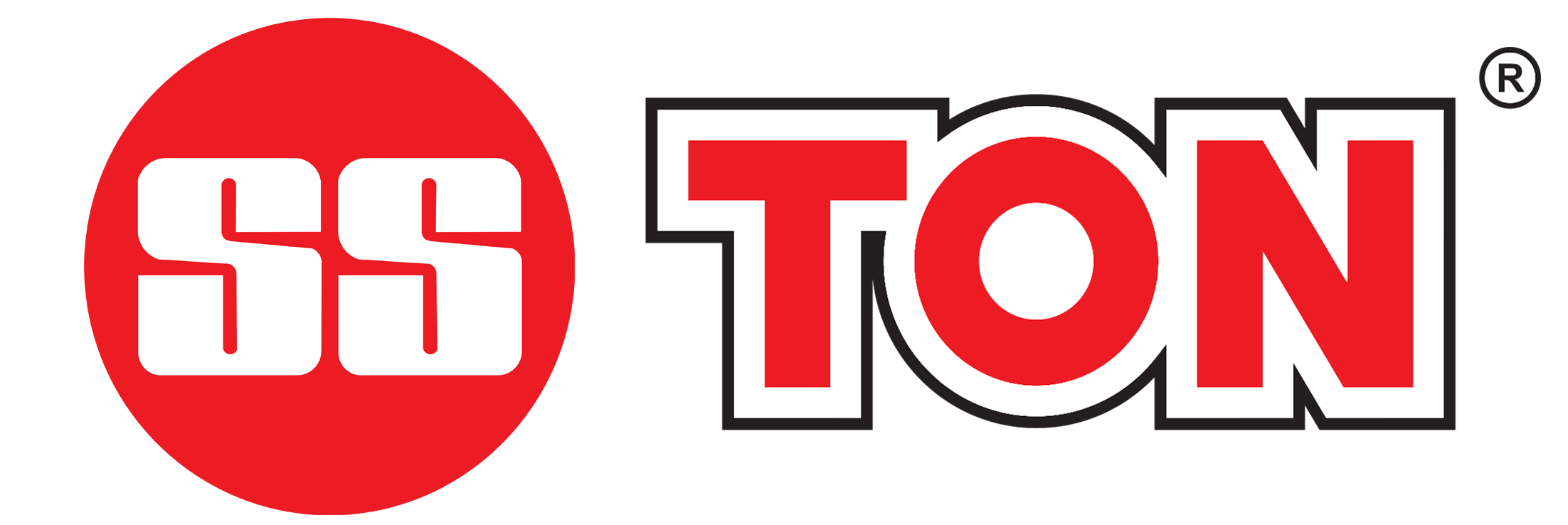
- Industry: Sports equipment
- Founded: 1969; 57 years ago
- Founder: NK Sareen
- Headquarters: Meerut, Uttar Pradesh, India
- Area served: Worldwide
- Products: Cricket clothing and equipment, accessories
- Website: sstoncricket.com

Sareen Sports Industries (SS) is an Indian sports equipment manufacturing company specialising in cricket, with its headquarters located in Meerut, Uttar Pradesh. The firm was founded in 1969 by NK Sareen and became one of the world's leading cricket equipment manufacturers.

Sareen produces cricket clothing and equipment including bats, balls, helmet, batting gloves, protective gear, athletic shoes, bags, and clothing. The company is best known for its SS Sunridges line of bats, which debuted in 1976. SS bats are exported around the world, and have been used by several of the world's best batsmen, including Aasif Sheikh, Ajinkya Rahane, Kumar Sangakkara, Yuvraj Singh, Shikhar Dhawan, Nicholas Pooran, Jonny Bairstow, Quinton De Kock, Kieron Pollard, Tim David and Shai Hope. SS bats carrying other manufacturers names have also been used by leading players, including MS Dhoni, whose bat displayed Reebok branding.
