= China Railways SS1 =

Chinese electric locomotive class

SS1 韶山1
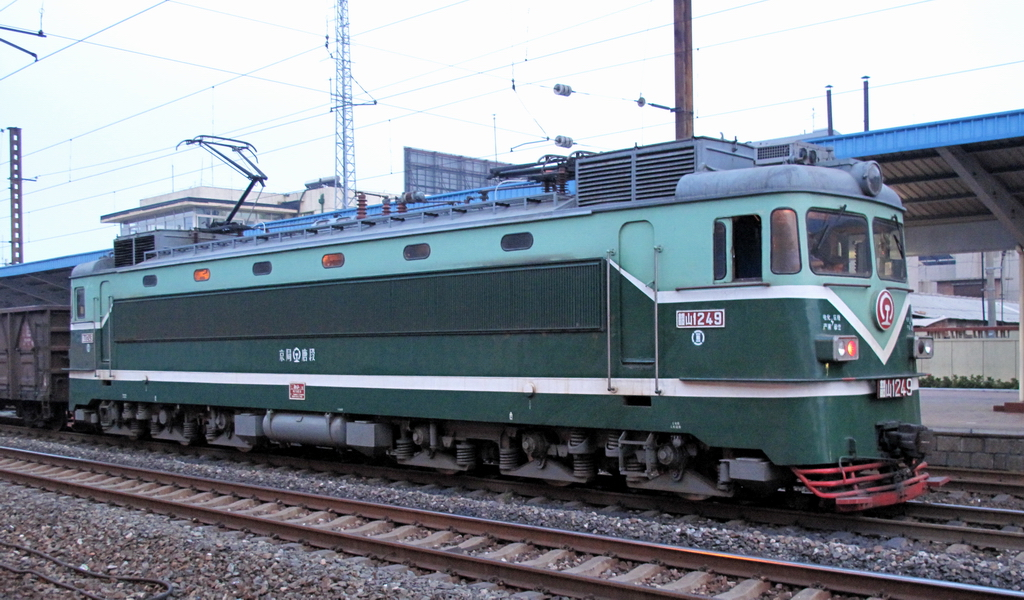
- 韶山1－249
Type and origin
- Power type: Electric
- Builder: Zhuzhou Electric Locomotive Works
- Model: 6Y_{1} / SS_{1}
- Build date: 1968—1988
- Total produced: 7 (6Y1); 819 (SS1)
Specifications
- Configuration
  - UIC: Co′Co′
- Gauge: 1,435 mm (4 ft 8 1/2 in)
- Length: 19,400 mm (63 ft 8 in)
- Electric system/s: 25 kV 50 Hz AC Catenary
- Current pickup: Pantograph
- Transmission: AC—DC
Performance figures
- Maximum speed: 95 km/h (59 mph)
- Power output: 3,780 kW (5,070 hp)

The Shaoshan 1 (Chinese: 韶山1; pinyin: Sháoshān Yī Nickname: Chinese: 芍药; pinyin: Sháoyào) is a type of AC-powered electric locomotive used by China Railway. This locomotive was the first Chinese electric main line locomotive, built by the Zhuzhou Electric Locomotive Works with the assistance of the Soviet Union and following the design of the Soviet-N6O electric locomotive (SŽD VL60). The power supply was industrial-frequency single-phase AC, and the axle arrangement Co-Co.

== History ==
The first prototype locomotive, 6Y1-001, which used an ignitron-controlled rectifier, was produced in 1958. A further 6 prototypes (002 to 007) were produced between 1962 and 1966. A silicon semiconductor-controlled rectifier was used from No. 004 onwards.

In response to technology of the French-made 6Y2 locomotive, Zhuzhou Plant made major modification in the design of the 6Y1 locomotive, improving the reliability of the rectifier, traction motors and rheostatic braking system. The eighth locomotive, No. 008, was produced in 1968. The series was also renamed from 6Y1 to SS1 (SS stands for Shaoshan, birthplace of Chinese leader Mao Zedong). The model went out of production in 1988 with a total of 826 manufactured: 7 of 6Y1 and 819 of SS1.

== Gallery ==
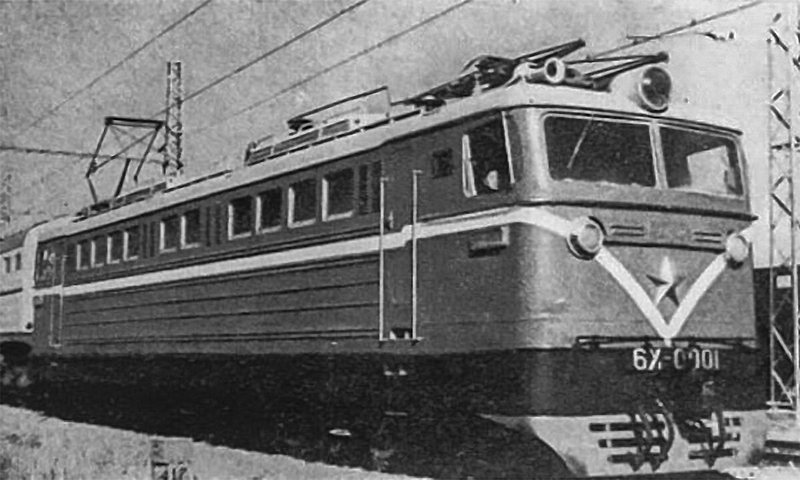
6Y1－0001

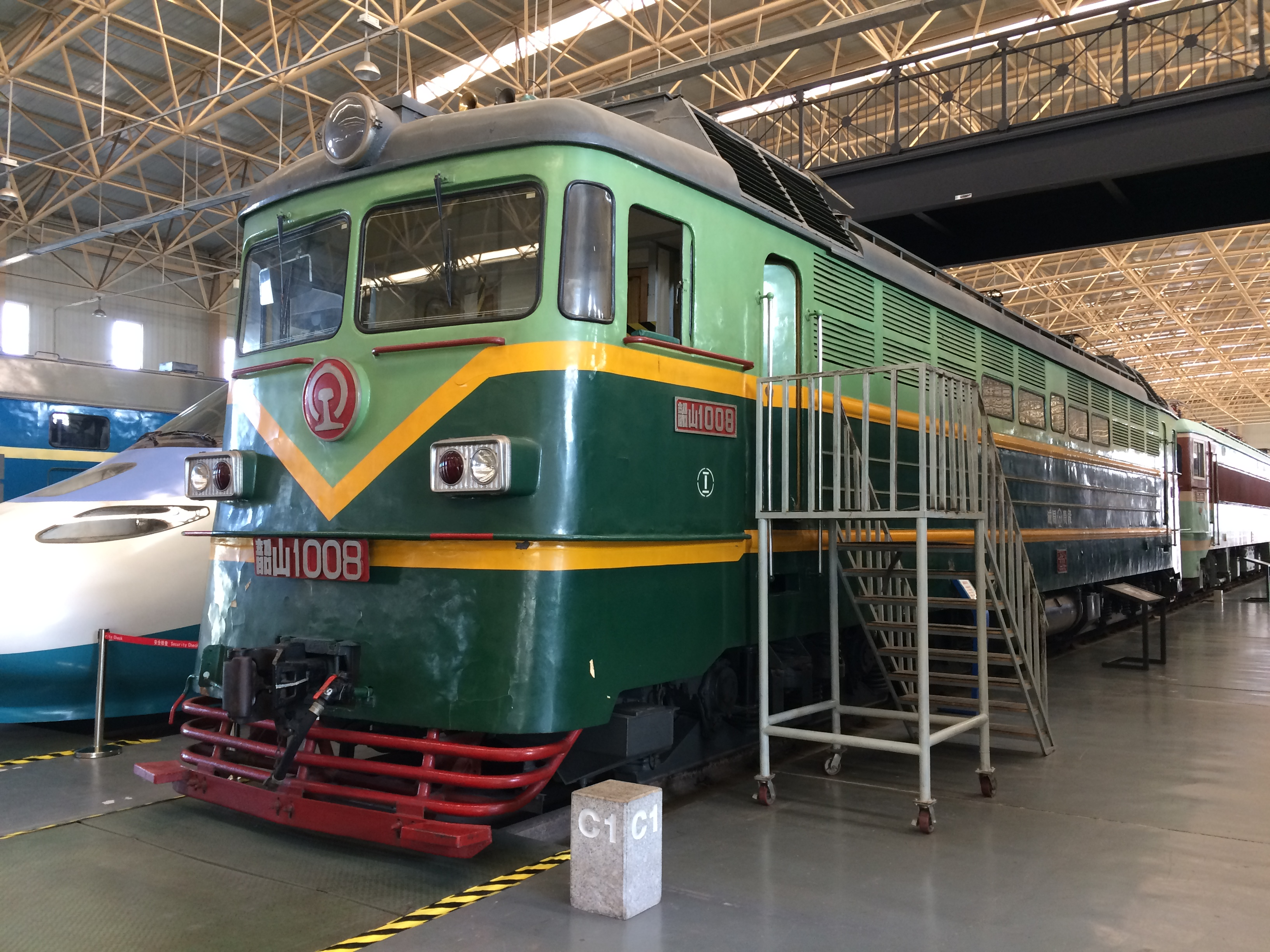
韶山1－008 in China Railway Museum

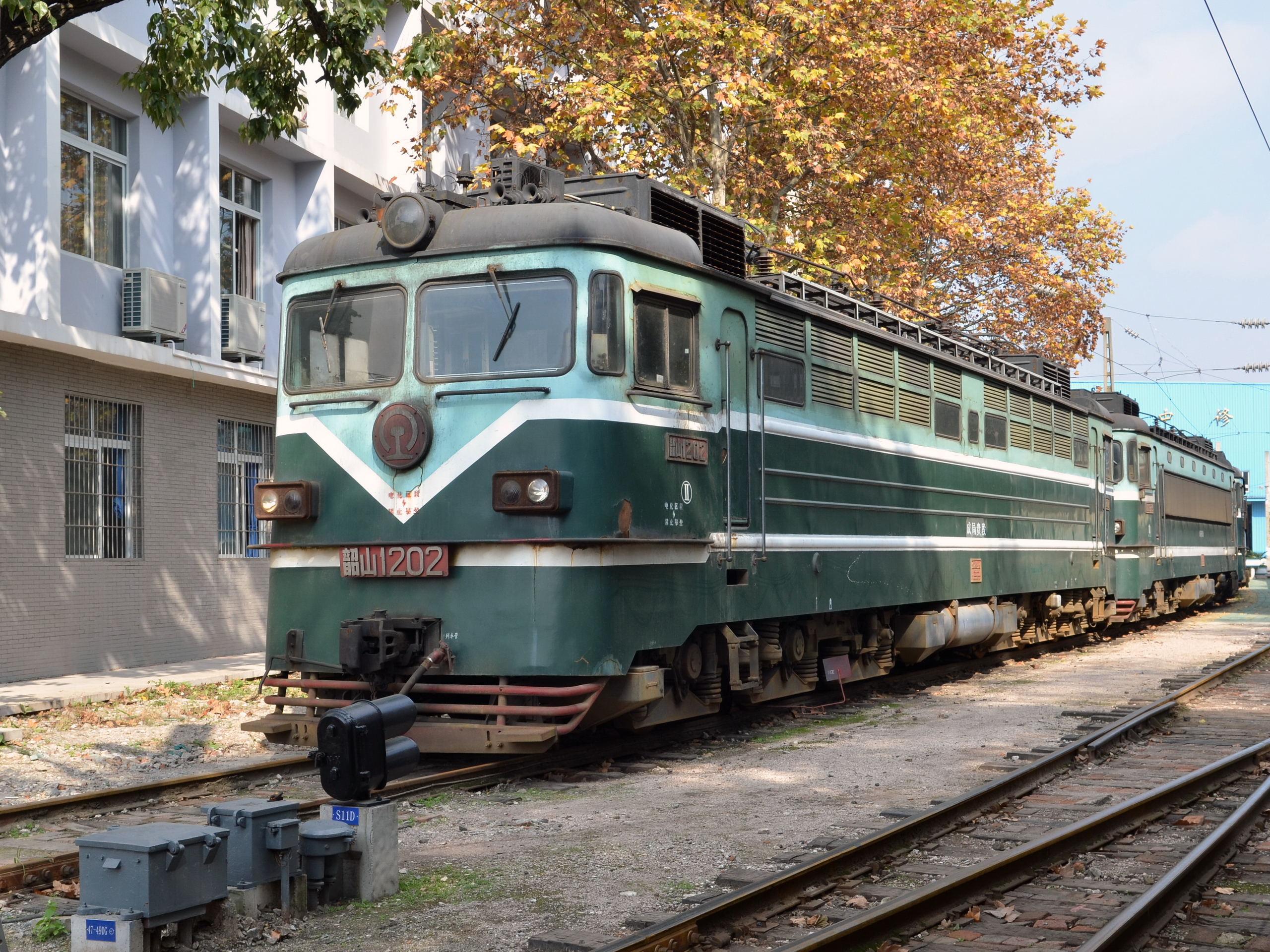
韶山1－202 in Guiyang Locomotive Depot

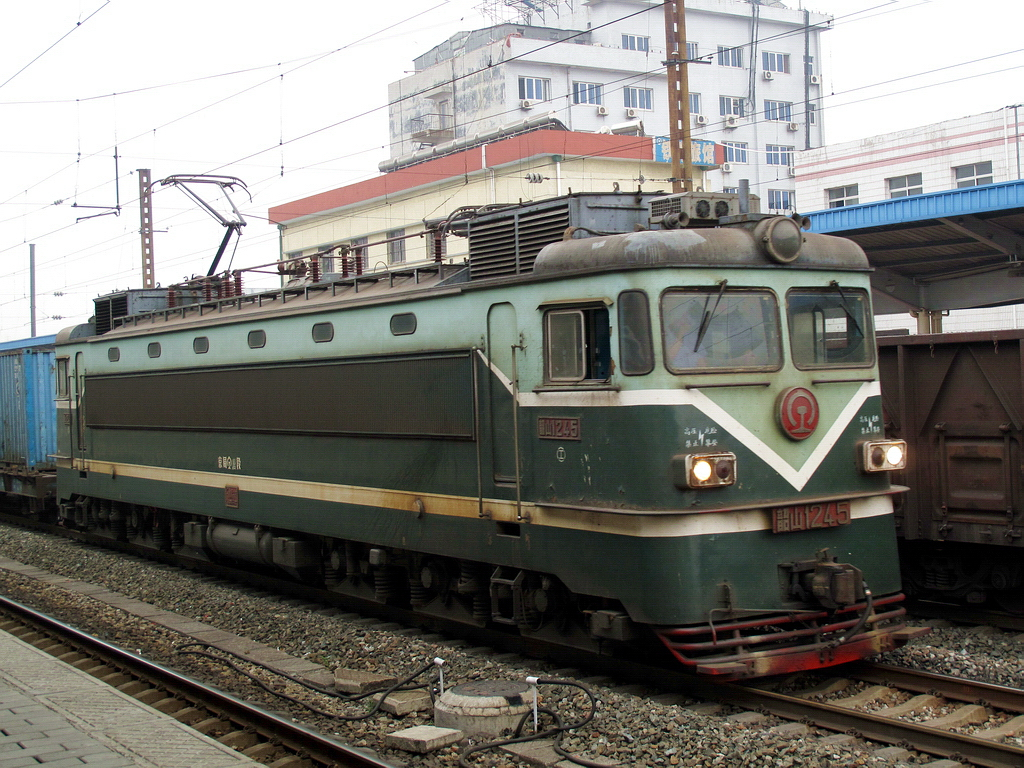
韶山1－245 at Qinhuangdao Railway Station

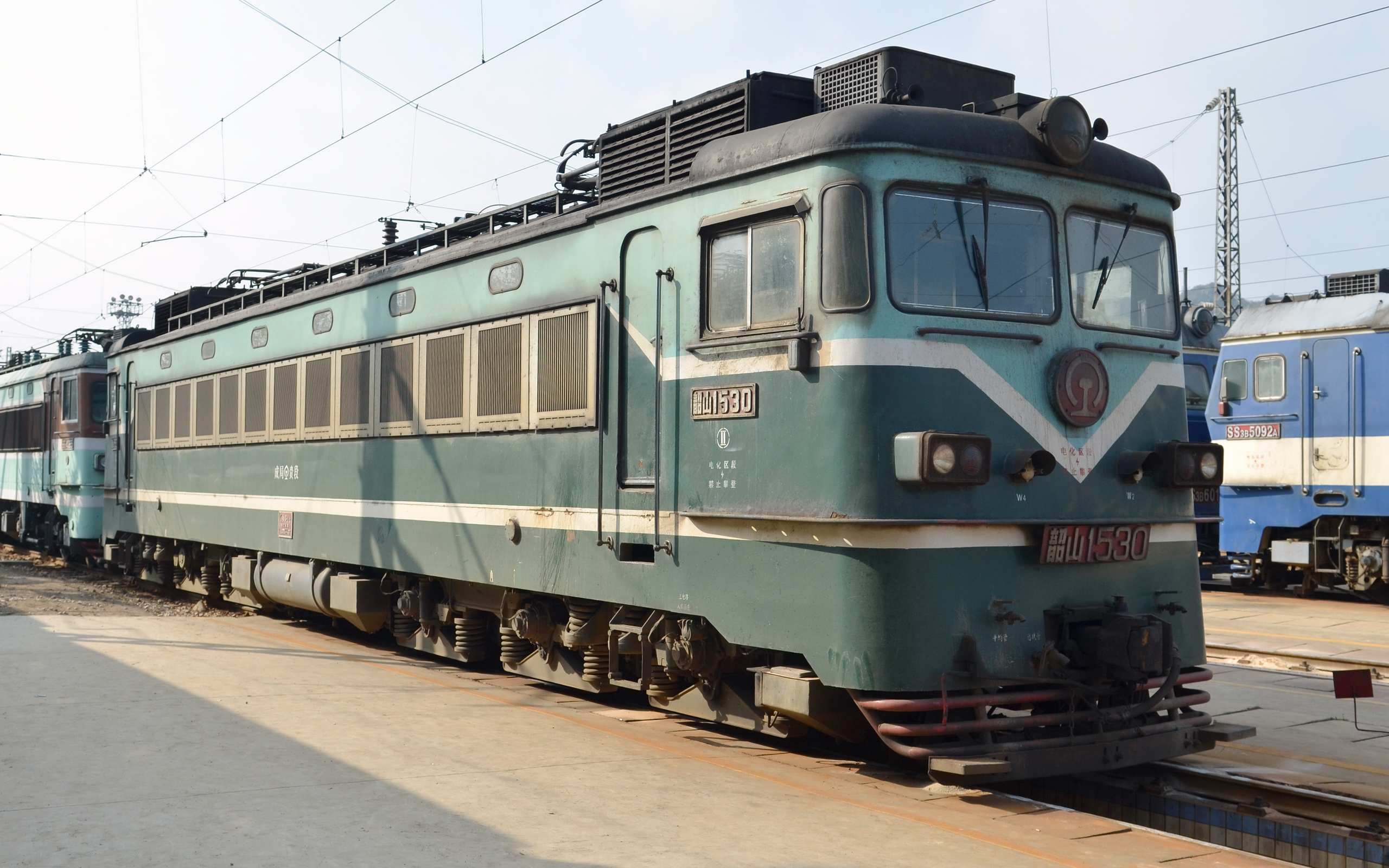
韶山1－530 in Guiyang Locomotive Depot

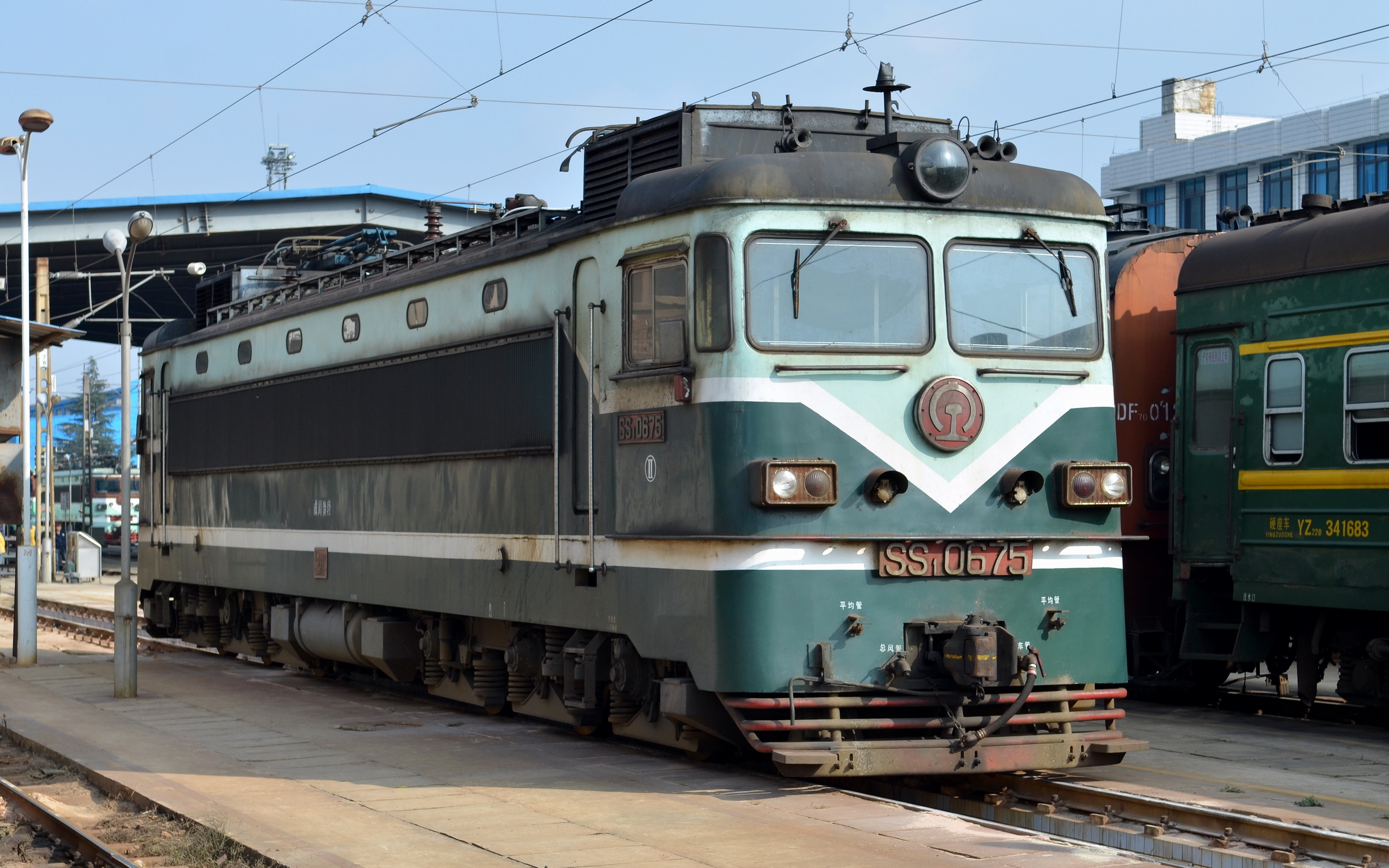
SS1－0675 in Guiyang Locomotive Depot

== Preservation ==
- SS1-008: is preserved at the China Railway Museum.
- SS1-061: is preserved at Baoji Electric Locomotive Repair Depot
- SS1-156: is preserved at Zhengzhou Century Amusement Park
- SS1-160: is preserved at Beijing Railway Electrification College
- SS1-254: is preserved at Fengtai Locomotive Depot, Beijing Railway Bureau.
- SS1-277: is preserved at Heilongjiang Communications Polytechnic.
- SS1-307: is preserved at Yuci Reentry Depot, Taiyuan Railway Bureau
- SS1-309: is preserved at Taiyuan Locomotive Depot, Taiyuan Railway Bureau
- SS1-321: is preserved at Wuhan Railway Vocational College Of Technology
- SS1 0681 is preserved at the China Railway Museum.
- SS1-695: is preserved at the Shenyang Railway Museum.
- SS1 0818: is preserved at the Southwest Jiaotong University.
